= IUP Crimson Hawks men's basketball =

2023–24 IUP Crimson Hawks men's basketball team
- University: Indiana University of Pennsylvania
- All-time record: 1,479–764 (.659)
- Head coach: Joe Lombardi (18th season)
- Conference: PSAC
- Location: Indiana, Pennsylvania
- Arena: Kovalchick Convention and Athletic Complex (capacity: 4,000)
- Nickname: Crimson Hawks
- Colors: Crimson and gray

NCAA tournament Final Four
- NCAA Division II; 1995, 2002, 2010, 2015, 2022
Other NCAA tournament results
Elite Eight	1994, 1995, 2000, 2002, 2010, 2015, 2022
Sweet Sixteen	1994, 1995, 2000, 2002, 2010, 2011, 2013, 2015, 2022, 2023
Appearances	1994, 1995, 1996, 2000, 2002, 2004, 2005, 2009, 2010, 2011, 2012, 2013, 2014, 2015, 2017, 2019, 2022, 2023

Conference regular-season champions
- 1960, 1974, 1995, 2000, 2002, 2004, 2010, 2011, 2013, 2019, 2020, 2022, 2023

IUP Crimson Hawks men's basketball team is a Division II basketball program who represents Indiana University of Pennsylvania. The program has been in the NCAA Division II Men's Basketball Championship nineteen times making the Sweet 16 ten times, Elite 8 seven times, the Final Four five times, and has appeared in the National Championship game twice, coming up short both times in 2010 and 2015. The team's first season was 1927-28 when the team went 4–9.

The Crimson Hawks play their home games at Kovalchick Convention and Athletic Complex in Indiana, Pennsylvania. They are currently coached by Joe Lombardi. In 2010, Joe Lombardi was named the Basketball Times Division II Coach of the Year, following the team's finish as national runner-up.

== History ==
The program's inaugural season was in 1927. The team has played every season since 1927 except two seasons during World War II due to the players needing to enlist.

== Season by season record ==
The overall record of this program is 1479–764.

Statistics overview
Season	Team	Overall	Conference	Standing	Postseason
1927–28	IUP	4–9	-	-	-
1928–29	IUP	8–5	-	-	-
1929–30	IUP	8–9	-	-	-
1930–31	IUP	5–10	-	-	-
1931–32	IUP	3–10	-	-	-
1932–33	IUP	9–6	-	-	-
1933–34	IUP	11–4	-	-	-
1934–35	IUP	10–4	-	-	-
1935–36	IUP	11–4	-	-	-
1936–37	IUP	7–8	-	-	-
1937–38	IUP	10–8	-	-	-
1938–39	IUP	7–11	-	-	-
1939–40	IUP	9–8	-	-	-
1940–41	IUP	10–8	-	-	-
1941–42	IUP	14–4	-	-	-
1942–43	IUP	5–4	-	-	-
1944–45	IUP	No team	-	-	-
1945–46	IUP	No team	-	-	-
1946–47	IUP	6–8	-	-	-
1947–48	IUP	13–4	-	-	-
1948–49	IUP	7–9	-	-	-
1949–50	IUP	6–10	-	-	-
1950–51	IUP	12–5	-	-	-
1951–52	IUP	9–12	-	-	-
1952–53	IUP	5–15	-	-	-
1953–54	IUP	13–6	-	-	-
1954–55	IUP	15–5	-	-	-
1955–56	IUP	16–7	-	-	-
1956–57	IUP	15–6	-	-	-
1957–58	IUP	25–3	-	-	-
1958–59	IUP	15–5	-	-	-
1959–60	IUP	14–7	-	1st	
Total:		1479–764 (since 1927)			
National champion Postseason invitational champion Conference regular season champion Conference regular season and conference tournament champion Division regular season champion Division regular season and conference tournament champion Conference tournament champion

== Program leaders ==
- Note All numbers as of May 1, 2023
- Bold still active

Points

1. Darryl Webb (1,949)
2. Jacobo Diaz (1,747)
3. Robert Misenko (1,715)
4. Brandon Norfleet (1,678)
5. Julian Sanders (1,655)

Games Played

1. Shawndale Jones (135)
2. Devon Cottrell (133)
3. Dave Morris (130)
4. Ashton Smith (127)
5. Devante Chance (127)

Assists

1. Dante Lombardi (567)
2. Devante Chance (512)
3. Ashton Smith (456)
4. Mont Mattocks (450)
5. Eddie Peterson (425)

Rebounds

1. Darryl Webb (1,214)
2. Jacobo Diaz (1,105)
3. Garry Lupek (881)
4. Lee McCullough (877)
5. Robert Misenko (826)

== Coaching history ==
The Crimson Hawks have had a history of eight head coaches. The current head coach is Joe Lonbardi.

Head Coach	Tenure	Overall	Conf	Notes
George Miller	1927–39, 1943	98–92	—	First head coach in program history, was first to win 10+ games in single-season.
Bob Timmons	1939–42, 1945–47	52–32	—	—
Peck McKnight	1947–63	201–122	—	Won first ever PSAC championship in 1960 for school, first head coach to have 25 or more wins in single-season
Herm Sledzik	1963–70	103–53	—	—
Carl Davis	1970–83	199–124	65–45	Was first IUP head coach to coach during conference games
Tom Beck	1983–88	66–70	27–25	—
Kurt Kanaskie	1988–96	152–75	53–43	—
Gary Edwards	1996–2006	206–88	109–39	—
Joe Lombardi	2006–Present	400–108	245–56	—

== Retired numbers ==
No.	Player	Tenure	Date Retired
15	Darryl Webb	2007–09	February 13, 2013

== Championships and tournament runs ==
=== PSAC championships ===
- PSAC Championships (13): 1960, 1974, 1995, 2000, 2002, 2004, 2010–11, 2013, 2019-20, 2022-23
- PSAC Tournament Appearances (36): 1961, 1974, 1981–82, 1984–87, 1993–2002, 2004–06, 2008–20, 2022-23
- PSAC West Championships (19): 1974, 1981–82, 1994–95, 2002, 2005, 2010–14, 2016–20, 2022-23

=== NCAA tournament ===
- NCAA Tournament Appearances (19): 1994–96, 2000, 2002, 2004–05, 2009–15, 2017, 2019-20, 2022-23
- NCAA Sweet Sixteen Appearances (10): 1994–95, 2000, 2002, 2010–11, 2013, 2015, 2022-23
- NCAA Elite Eight Appearances (7): 1994–95, 2000, 2002, 2010, 2015, 2022
- NCAA Final Four Appearances (5): 1995, 2002, 2010, 2015, 2022
- NCAA Championship Game Appearances (2): 2010, 2015

== Record vs D1 opponents ==
The Crimson Hawks have played nine NCAA Division I men's basketball teams going 1–11 in 12 games played all scheduled as exhibition games. The Crimson Hawks led going into half time once in 2012 vs Maryland leading 23–21 then being outscored 52 to 38 in the second have and tied once at 37 points with South Florida in 2014. IUP's only win vs Division I opponent came against Bucknell when Kevin Stewert hit a game-winning three pointer.

Opponent	Score	Season	Site	All-time record
#4 Villanova	L 94–49	2016	Wells Fargo Center	0–1
#19 Syracuse	L 83–65	2016	Carrier Dome	0–1
Siena	L 82–73	2015	Times Union Center	0–1
Pittsburgh	L 72–58 & L 69–54	2014 & 2012	Petersen Events Center	0–2
South Florida	L 77–72	2014	Sun Dome	0–1
La Salle	L 87–57	2013	Tom Gola Arena	0–1
#2 Michigan State	L 83–45	2013	Breslin Center	0–1
Maryland	L 73–81	2012	Xfinity Center	0–1
Bucknell	L 78–71 & W 67–64	2008 & 2009	Sojka Pavilion	1–1
Total				1–11
