= Joe Lombardi (basketball) =

American basketball coach (born 1959)

Current position
- Title: Head coach
- Team: Indiana (PA)
- Conference: Pennsylvania State Athletic Conference

Biographical details
- Born: November 7, 1959 (age 66); Sharon, Pennsylvania

Playing career
- 1977–1981: Youngstown State

Coaching career (HC unless noted)
- 1981–1982: Ohio (GA)
- 1982–1983: Youngstown State (asst.)
- 1984–1987: Indiana (PA) (asst.)
- 1987–1992: Saint Francis (asst.)
- 1992–2001: St. Bonaventure (asst.)
- 2001–2003: La Salle (asst.)
- 2003–2006: Pittsburgh (asst.)
- 2006–present: Indiana (PA)

Accomplishments and honors

Championships
- 2010 NCAA Men's Division II runner-up

Awards
- 2010 Basketball Times Division II National Coach of the Year

Joe Lombardi (born November 7, 1959) is an American basketball coach currently the head coach for the Indiana University of Pennsylvania (IUP) Crimson Hawks of Pennsylvania State Athletic Conference in NCAA Division II. Prior to taking the head coaching position at IUP, Lombardi served as an assistant coach, including a nine-year tenure at La Salle University and three season under Jamie Dixon at the University of Pittsburgh. In his fourth season with the Crimson Hawks in 2009–10, Lombardi led the team to the 2010 NCAA Men's Division II Basketball Championship where they were defeated by the Cal Poly Pomona Broncos. Following the season, Lomardi was named as the 2010 Basketball Times Division II National Coach of the Year.

== Early life and playing career ==
Lombardi was raised in Sharon, Pennsylvania. He played high school basketball at Kennedy Christian High School in Hermitage, Pennsylvania. He attended Youngstown State University from 1977 to 1981, where he was a four-time letterman in basketball, and served as team captain his final two seasons. He graduated with honors and a degree in education.

== Coaching career ==
After graduating from Youngstown State, Lombardi served as a graduate assistant coach under Danny Nee at Ohio University during the 1981–82 season. The following season, he served as a part-time assistant at Youngstown State. In 1984 he was appointed a full-time assistant at Indiana University of Pennsylvania (IUP), where he served for three seasons.

Following his stint at IUP, Lombardi served as an assistant to Jim Baron at Saint Francis University in Loretto, Pennsylvania from 1987 to 1992. During Lombardi's time at Saint Francis, the Red Flash had two of their best seasons in 20 years. During the 1990–91 season, the Red Flash recorded a 24–8 record, won the Northeast Conference and earned the school's first appearance in the NCAA Men's Division I Basketball Championship as a #15 seed. Also at Saint Francis, Lombardi guided Mike Iuzzolino, who was selected 35th overall by the Dallas Mavericks in the 1991 NBA draft.

After his five-year tenure at Saint Francis, Lombardi served for nine seasons at St. Bonaventure University, including as associate head coach from 1996 to 2001. In 2000 the Bonnies went 21–10, made the Atlantic 10 final and the 2000 NCAA Men's Division I Basketball Tournament. The Bonnies also appeared in the National Invitational Tournament in 1995, 1998 and 2001. At St. Bonaventure, Lombardi was responsible for recruiting J.R. Bremer, who was a National Basketball Association All-Rookie second team selection in 2002.

Between 2001 and 2003 Lombardi served as an assistant at La Salle University under coach Bill Hahn. With the Explorers, Lombardi coached second-round Miami Heat draft pick Rasual Butler and helped revive the university's program.

In 2003, Lombardi joined the University of Pittsburgh staff under head coach Jamie Dixon. Lombardi was primarily focused on recruiting, scouting opponents, and player development. During his time at Pitt, the Panthers amassed a 76–22 record, played in the Big East Championship game in 2004 and 2005, and advanced to their third consecutive Sweet Sixteen in 2004. While with the Panthers, Lombardi was responsible for recruiting Gilbert Brown and Sam Young, who was a 2009 All-American and a 2009 second-round selection by the Memphis Grizzlies.

In April 2006, Lombardi was named the head coach at Indiana University of Pennsylvania. The Crimson Hawks compete in the Pennsylvania State Athletic Conference of NCAA Division II. Lombardi previously served as an assistant under Tom Beck for three seasons with IUP between 1984 and 1987.

In 2007, before the start of Lombardi's second season, the basketball team, as well as IUP's swimming team, was placed on probation by the NCAA for violations committed by his predecessor between 2000 and 2006. As a result, the basketball team had forfeited two athletic scholarships for the previous season, and Lombardi and his assistants were permitted a limited number of recruiting days away from campus.

In his first season, the team went 6–21, and improved to 13–15 during the next season. In 2008, the team returned to the PSAC Tournament. Lombardi continued to be successful in recruiting, coaching three consecutive PSAC West Freshman of the Year between 2006 and 2009. In 2008–09 the Crimson Hawks went 22–8 and returned to the NCAA tournament for the first time since 2005, and the first time under Lombardi. In the tournament, IUP won its first-round match-up against Virginia Union before being defeated by PSAC rival Kutztown.

In 2009–10, the Crimson Hawks won a school-record of 33 games, finishing the season with a 33–3 record and ranked as high as #2 in the nation. The team set a PSAC record after finishing 13–1 in their West Division. They won the PSAC Tournament by defeating Gannon, East Stroudsburg and Kutztown, earning an automatic bid to the 2010 NCAA tournament.

Upon entering the NCAA tournament, the Crimson Hawks won the Atlantic Regional bracket on their home court by defeating Fairmont State, West Virginia State, and West Liberty, and advanced to the Elite Eight at the MassMutual Center in Springfield, Massachusetts. In that national quarterfinal, the Crimson Hawks beat Valdosta State, and defeated St. Cloud State in the Final Four to advance to the team's first NCAA Championship Game.

In the championship, the Crimson Hawks were defeated by the Cal Poly Pomona Broncos, 65–53. The Crimson Hawks trailed the entire game. In the first half the Broncos led by as many as 14 points, and held a 35–25 halftime lead.

Following the 2009–10 season, Lombardi was named the Basketball Times Division II Coach of the Year, following the team's finish as national runner-up.

In 2010–11, Lombardi and the Crimson Hawks won their second consecutive PSAC West and overall tournament championships. They were selected as the second seed in the Atlantic Region before losing in the regional final to West Liberty.

== Head coaching record ==
Standings are for the PSAC West Division.

Record table
Season	Team	Overall	Conference	Standing	Postseason
IUP Crimson Hawks (PSAC) (2006–present)
2006–07	IUP	6–21	3–9	6th of 7	
2007–08	IUP	13–15	5–7	4th of 7	PSAC Quarterfinals
2008–09	IUP	22–8	10–4	3rd of 8	PSAC Quarterfinals; NCAA Second Round
2009–10	IUP	33–3	13–1	1st of 8	PSAC Tournament Champion; NCAA Runner-Up
2010–11	IUP	26-6	12-2	1st of 8	PSAC Tournament Champion; NCAA Second Round
2011–12	IUP	23-6	19-3	1st of 8	PSAC Semifinals; NCAA First Round
2012–13	IUP	26-6	17-5	1st of 8	PSAC Tournament Champion; NCAA Second Round
2013–14	IUP	24-5	13-3	2nd of 8	PSAC Quarterfinals; NCAA Second Round
IUP:		400–108 (.787)	245–56 (.814)		
