= Bellarmine Knights men's basketball =

Men's basketball team that represents Bellarmine University

| 2026–27 Bellarmine Knights men's basketball team |
- University: Bellarmine University
- Head coach: Doug Davenport (2nd season)
- Location: Louisville, Kentucky
- Arena: Knights Hall (capacity: 2,196)
- Conference: Atlantic Sun Conference
- Nickname: Knights
- Colors: Scarlet and silver

NCAA Division I tournament champions
- 2011*
Other NCAA Division I tournament results
| Final Four | 2011*, 2012*, 2015*, 2017*, |
| Elite Eight | 2011*, 2012*, 2015*, 2017*, |
| Sweet Sixteen | 2009*, 2011*, 2012*, 2013*, 2015*, 2017*, 2019* |
| Appearances | 1963*, 1965*, 1969*, 1970*, 1977*, 1982*, 1984*, 1989*, 1991*, 2009*, 2010*, 2011*, 2012*, 2013*, 2014*, 2015*, 2016*, 2017*, 2018*, 2019* |

Conference tournament champions
- GLVC: 2010, 2011, 2017, 2018, 2019 ASUN: 2022

Conference regular-season champions
- GLVC: 1991, 2011, 2012, 2015, 2016, 2017, 2018

Uniforms
| Home | Away |
- *at Division II level

The Bellarmine Knights men's basketball team represents Bellarmine University in Louisville, Kentucky, United States. The Knights compete in the Atlantic Sun Conference (ASUN) at the NCAA Division I level, after being a member of the Great Lakes Valley Conference (GLVC) from the conference's founding in 1972 through the 2019–20 season. They are currently led by head coach Doug Davenport and play their home games on campus at Knights Hall.

== History ==
The program began in 1950, coinciding with the opening of Bellarmine College. The team played its first game on December 27, 1950, against St. Mary's College. The team joined the Kentucky Intercollegiate Athletic Conference (KIAC) in 1951 and remained in the conference until 1964. The Knights won the program's first conference title under Alex Groza when the team won the 1963 KIAC regular season and tournament titles. In addition Groza was named the KIAC coach of the year. That season also marked the first bid to the NCAA College Division, now Division II, basketball tournament.

Prior to the Division I transition, BU became one of the country's premier NCAA Division II college basketball programs. The Knights won five Great Lakes Valley Conference (GLVC) tournament championships in 2009–10, 2010–11, 2016–17, 2017–18, 2018–19 and won GLVC regular season champion in 2010–11, 2011–12, 2014–15, 2015–16, 2016–17, and 2017–18. In NCAA postseason play, the Knights made 11-straight NCAA DII postseason appearances from 2009 to 2019, including four Division II Final Four appearances and won the 2011 NCAA Division II men's basketball tournament. The 2011 victory marked the first athletic national championship in the university's history.

It was on March 26, 2011, that the Knights won their first NCAA Division II National Championship, led by guards Jeremy Kendle and Braydon Hobbs. The Knights defeated BYU–Hawaii for the title, 71–68. The championship game aired on national television on the CBS network. An estimated 2,906 fans were in attendance for the championship game, most of which were Bellarmine fans that had made the 900-mile (1,400 km) trip from Louisville to watch the Knights compete in the championship held in Springfield, Massachusetts at the MassMutual Center.

=== Division I transition ===
On June 19, 2019, the university's athletic program officially announced it accepted an invitation to join the Atlantic Sun Conference (then branded as the ASUN Conference) and transition to NCAA Division I beginning in the 2020–21 school year. The transition sent the Knights, a Division II perennial power during the first two decades of the 21st century, into a multiyear transition process. During the four-year process to transition, Bellarmine competed at the Division I level, but could not qualify for NCAA-organized postseason play (i.e., the Division I tournament and the NIT). The Knights were eligible to participate postseason events not organized by the NCAA, such as the College Basketball Invitational and The Basketball Classic.

After a preseason shutdown due to the COVID-19 pandemic, the Knights played their first game at the Division I level on the road against the sixth-ranked Duke Blue Devils. It was a historic night for the program, albeit in a quieter than usual Cameron Indoor Stadium. Despite staying close for the first half, Bellarmine ended up falling short to Duke, 76–54. Junior guard Dylan Penn entered the history books during the game, as he was responsible for scoring the first ever points in Bellarmine's history at the Division I level.

Two days after the loss to Duke, Bellarmine made a different kind of history for the program, which was undoubtedly more positive. On December 6, 2020, the Knights traveled to the doorsteps of Howard University and dismantled the Bison 84–63 to notch their first ever win at the Division I level.

Bellarmine had a very successful first season at the Division I level. They dropped their first two games of ASUN play to Lipscomb, but were undeterred. The Knights rattled off 10 consecutive wins to send a strong message to the rest of the conference. They went undefeated on the road in conference play, with a 6–0 record. At one point, Bellarmine had the fourth longest winning streak in the country.

The Knights were so successful that their regular season finale against Liberty got moved to ESPNU, because it was a de facto winner-take-all game for the regular-season conference championship. Bellarmine fell short, 94–78, but they achieved a COVID sellout of over 2,700 fans.

The Knights were ineligible for the NCAA tournament and the NIT, but they were invited to the 2021 CBI Tournament. Held in Daytona Beach, Florida, Bellarmine defeated Army, 77–67, in the quarterfinals of the tournament, before falling short to Pepperdine, 82–71, in the semifinals.

After being picked to finish last in the conference during the preseason, Bellarmine finished their first Division I season with a 14–8 overall record, including a 10–3 mark in conference play that helped them finish second in the ASUN. They also recorded the first Division I postseason victory in program history. Forward Pedro Bradshaw and guard Dylan Penn were honored for their outstanding seasons, as Bradshaw was the runner-up for ASUN Player of the Year and was a unanimous All-ASUN First Team selection, while Penn also earned All-ASUN First Team honors.

After the 2024–25 season, head coach Scott Davenport retired after 20 seasons. His son and top assistant Doug, who had been named his father's designated successor in 2022, was promoted to head coach the next day.

== Postseason ==
=== CBI results ===
The Knights have appeared in one College Basketball Invitational (CBI). Their record is 1–1.

| Year | Round | Opponent | Result |
|---|---|---|---|
| 2021 | First round Semifinals | Army; Pepperdine | W 77–67; L 71–82 |

=== NCAA Division II tournament results ===
The Knights have appeared in the NCAA Division II Tournament twenty times. They finished with a record of 32–22.

| Year | Round | Opponent | Result |
|---|---|---|---|
| 1963 | Regional semifinals Regional 3rd-place game | Oglethorpe; Austin Peay | L 49–57; W 96–86 |
| 1965 | Regional semifinals Regional Finals | Norfolk State; Evansville | W 91–74; L 74–81 |
| 1969 | Regional semifinals Regional 3rd-place game | Alcorn State; Transylvania | L 75–76; L 64–65 |
| 1970 | Regional semifinals Regional 3rd-place game | Tennessee State; Transylvania | L 77–82; W 114–62 |
| 1977 | Regional semifinals Regional 3rd-place game | Eastern Illinois; Youngstown State | L 72–87; L 79–81 |
| 1982 | Regional semifinals Regional 3rd-place game | Central State; Wright State | L 61–63; L 86–87 |
| 1984 | Regional semifinals Regional 3rd-place game | Lewis; Cal State Bakersfield | L 87–93; W 81–71 |
| 1989 | Regional semifinals Regional Finals | Ferris State; Kentucky Wesleyan | W 108–92; L 77–84 |
| 1991 | Regional semifinals Regional 3rd-place game | Grand Valley State; Missouri Western State | L 73–78; W 94–83 |
| 2009 | Regional Quarterfinals; Regional semifinals Regional Finals | Kentucky Wesleyan; Lake Superior State; Findlay | W 76–65; W 92–83; L 86–89 |
| 2010 | First round Regional semifinals | Central State; Quincy | W 70–66; L 61–66 |
| 2011 | Regional Quarterfinals; Regional semifinals Regional Finals; Quarterfinals; Semifinals; National championship | Indianapolis; Northern Kentucky; Ferris State; Midwestern State; Minnesota State; BYU–Hawaii | W 84–70; W 87–82; W 86–66; W 70–64; W 81–74; W 71–68 |
| 2012 | Regional Quarterfinals; Regional semifinals Regional Finals; Quarterfinals; Semifinals | Lewis; Findlay; Kentucky Wesleyan; Alabama–Huntsville; Montevallo | W 86–63; W 86–63; W 79–74; W 82–73; L 72–79 |
| 2013 | Regional Quarterfinals; Regional semifinals Regional Finals | Indianapolis; Southern Indiana; Drury | W 67–61; W 78–55; L 61–67 |
| 2014 | Regional Quarterfinals | Indianapolis | L 75–80 |
| 2015 | Regional Quarterfinals; Regional semifinals Regional Finals; Quarterfinals; Semifinals | Drury; Lake Superior State; Indianapolis; Minnesota State–Moorhead; Florida Southern | W 84–60; W 85–59; W 81–72; W 92–75; L 76–79 |
| 2016 | Regional Quarterfinals | Ferris State | L 84–100 |
| 2017 | Regional Quarterfinals; Regional semifinals Regional Finals; Quarterfinals; Semifinals | Wisconsin–Parkside; Quincy; Findlay; Colorado Mines; Fairmont State | W 72–61; W 93–64; W 84–66; W 92–72; L 68–79 |
| 2018 | Regional Quarterfinals; Regional semifinals | Truman; Findlay | W 82–65; L 73–74 |
| 2019 | Regional Quarterfinals; Regional semifinals Regional Finals | Walsh; Findlay; Southern Indiana | W 81–61; W 74–59; L 69–74 |

== Record year-by-year ==
Record table
| Season | Coach | Overall | Conference | Standing | Postseason |
|---|---|---|---|---|---|
Bellarmine College Knights (Independent) (1950–1951)
| 1950–51 | Norb Raque | 2–12 | | | |
Bellarmine College Knights (Kentucky Intercollegiate Athletic Conference) (1951–1963)
| 1951–52 | Norb Raque | 5–17 | | | |
| 1952–53 | Eddie Weber | 9–13 | | | |
| 1953–54 | Eddie Weber | 14–8 | | | |
| 1954–55 | Eddie Weber | 8–14 | | | |
| 1955–56 | Paulie Miller | 6–14 | | | |
| 1956–57 | Paulie Miller | 13–11 | | | |
| 1957–58 | Gene Kenney | 17–9 | | | |
| 1958–59 | Gene Kenney | 6–18 | | | |
| 1959–60 | Alex Groza | 7–15 | | | |
| 1960–61 | Alex Groza | 11–17 | | | |
| 1961–62 | Alex Groza | 11–11 | | | |
| 1962–63 | Alex Groza | 21–6 | | 1st | NCAA DII first round |
Bellarmine College Knights (Independent) (1963–1978)
| 1963–64 | Alex Groza | 13–12 | | | |
| 1964–65 | Alex Groza | 15–8 | | | NCAA DII second round |
| 1965–66 | Alex Groza | 13–8 | | | |
| 1966–67 | Jim Spalding | 12–13 | | | |
| 1967–68 | Jim Spalding | 13–12 | | | |
| 1968–69 | Jim Spalding | 19–9 | | | 1969 NCAA DII first round |
| 1969–70 | Jim Spalding | 17–10 | | | 1970 NCAA DII first round |
| 1970–71 | Jim Spalding | 10–16 | | | |
| 1971–72 | Joe Reibel | 9–17 | | | |
| 1972–73 | Joe Reibel | 12–14 | | | |
| 1973–74 | Joe Reibel | 12–13 | | | |
| 1974–75 | Joe Reibel | 15–10 | | | |
| 1975–76 | Joe Reibel | 18–7 | | | |
| 1976–77 | Joe Reibel | 17–11 | | | |
| 1977–78 | Joe Reibel | 16–10 | | | 1977 NCAA DII first round |
Bellarmine College Knights (Great Lakes Valley Conference) (1978–2000)
| 1978–79 | Joe Reibel | 14–12 | 4–4 | T–2nd | |
| 1979–80 | Joe Reibel | 17–9 | 7–3 | 2nd | |
| 1980–81 | Joe Reibel | 16–10 | 4–6 | 4th | |
| 1981–82 | Joe Reibel | 20–9 | 9–3 | T–2nd | 1982 NCAA DII first round |
| 1982–83 | Joe Reibel | 13–14 | 5–7 | T–4th | |
| 1983–84 | Joe Reibel | 21–9 | 8–4 | 3rd | 1984 NCAA DII first round |
| 1984–85 | Joe Reibel | 8–19 | 3–11 | T–5th | |
| 1985–86 | Joe Reibel | 13–14 | 7–9 | T–5th | |
| 1986–87 | Joe Reibel | 17–10 | 10–6 | T–2nd | |
| 1987–88 | Joe Reibel | 11–17 | 6–10 | T–5th | |
| 1988–89 | Joe Reibel | 22–8 | 11–5 | 2nd | 1989 NCAA DII second round |
| 1989–90 | Joe Reibel | 16–11 | 10–8 | T–3rd | |
| 1990–91 | Joe Reibel | 24–6 | 14–4 | T–1st | 1991 NCAA DII first round |
| 1991–92 | Joe Reibel | 17–11 | 10–8 | 3rd | |
| 1992–93 | Joe Reibel | 7–20 | 4–14 | T–7th | |
| 1993–94 | Joe Reibel | 11–16 | 5–13 | 7th | |
| 1994–95 | Bob Valvano | 10–14 | 4–14 | 6th | |
| 1995–96 | Bob Valvano | 12–16 | 5–15 | 8th | |
| 1996–97 | Bob Valvano | 16–11 | 9–11 | T–4th | |
| 1997–98 | Bob Valvano | 17–10 | 11–7 | T–5th | |
| 1998–99 | Charlie Just | 10–18 | 7–15 | T–8th | |
| 1999–00 | Charlie Just | 13–14 | 8–12 | T–5th | |
Bellarmine University Knights (Great Lakes Valley Conference) (2000–2020)
| 2000–01 | Charlie Just | 14–13 | 11–9 | T–4th | |
| 2001–02 | Charlie Just | 12–15 | 9–11 | T–5th | |
| 2002–03 | Chris Pullem | 10–18 | 5–15 | T–7th | |
| 2003–04 | Chris Pullem | 9–18 | 6–14 | 8th | |
| 2004–05 | Chris Pullem | 9–18 | 4–16 | 9th | |
| 2005–06 | Scott Davenport | 14–14 | 11–8 | 3rd (East) | |
| 2006–07 | Scott Davenport | 12–15 | 11–8 | 5th (East) | |
| 2007–08 | Scott Davenport | 14–14 | 11–8 | T–3rd (East) | |
| 2008–09 | Scott Davenport | 26–7 | 13–5 | 2nd (East) | 2009 NCAA DII Sweet Sixteen |
| 2009–10 | Scott Davenport | 23–9 | 12–6 | 3rd (East) | 2010 NCAA DII second round |
| 2010–11 | Scott Davenport | 33–2 | 17–1 | 1st (East) | 2011 NCAA DII National Champions |
| 2011–12 | Scott Davenport | 29–4 | 16–2 | 1st (East) | 2012 NCAA DII Final Four |
| 2012–13 | Scott Davenport | 24–8 | 12–6 | T–3rd (East) | 2013 NCAA DII Sweet Sixteen |
| 2013–14 | Scott Davenport | 23–8 | 12–6 | 3rd (East) | 2014 NCAA DII first round |
| 2014–15 | Scott Davenport | 31–4 | 17–1 | T–1st (East) | 2015 NCAA DII Final Four |
| 2015–16 | Scott Davenport | 23–7 | 15–3 | T–1st (East) | 2016 NCAA DII first round |
| 2016–17 | Scott Davenport | 32–4 | 17–1 | 1st (East) | 2017 NCAA DII Final Four |
| 2017–18 | Scott Davenport | 29–3 | 16–2 | 1st (East) | 2018 NCAA DII Second Four |
| 2018–19 | Scott Davenport | 28–5 | 14–4 | 2nd | 2019 NCAA DII Sweet Sixteen |
| 2019–20 | Scott Davenport | 20–8 | 13–7 | 5th | 2020 NCAA Division II men's basketball tournament |
Bellarmine University Knights (Atlantic Sun Conference) (2020–present)
| 2020–21 | Scott Davenport | 14–8 | 10–3 | 2nd | 2021 College Basketball Invitational |
| 2021-22 | Scott Davenport | 20-13 | 11-5 | 3rd | |
| Total: | | 1084–812 | ???–??? | | |
National champion Postseason invitational champion Conference regular season champion Conference regular season and conference tournament champion Division regular season champion Division regular season and conference tournament champion Conference tournament champion

- Totals updated through 2020–21 season.

== Facilities ==
The Knights played their home games at the on-campus Knights Hall from the venue's opening in 1960 through the 2019–20 season. It has a capacity of 2,196 and also hosts the school's volleyball team.

On November 2, 2020, the university announced a multi-year deal with the Kentucky State Fair Board to use Freedom Hall, located at the Kentucky Exposition Center near Louisville Muhammad Ali International Airport, for men's and women's basketball home games. Due to COVID-19 restrictions, the Knights would have been able to seat only 300 at their on-campus facility. Freedom Hall's basketball capacity of 18,252 allowed Bellarmine to seat 2,700 for games in its first D-I season. Freedom Hall, which opened in 1956, is best known as having been home to Louisville Cardinals men's basketball from its opening until the 2010 opening of the KFC Yum! Center in downtown Louisville, and was also home to the Kentucky Colonels of the ABA.

Bellarmine returned basketball to Knights Hall in 2024–25, coinciding with the end of the school's Division I transition.
