= Doug Davenport =

American college basketball coach

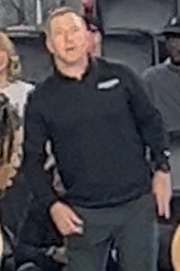
- Davenport in 2025

Current position
- Title: Head coach
- Team: Bellarmine
- Conference: ASUN
- Record: 13–19 (.406)

Biographical details
- Born: December 11, 1987 (age 38); Louisville, Kentucky, U.S.

Playing career
- 2006–2010: Bellarmine

Coaching career (HC unless noted)
- 2010–2012: Xavier (grad assistant)
- 2015–2016: Eastern Kentucky (assistant)
- 2016–2025: Bellarmine (assistant)
- 2025–present: Bellarmine

Administrative career (AD unless noted)
- 2012–2015: Louisville (director of video operations)

Head coaching record
- Overall: 13–19 (.406)

Doug Davenport (born December 11, 1987) is an American college basketball coach who is currently the head coach at Bellarmine University, his alma mater.

== Playing career ==
Davenport graduated from Ballard High School and then went on to play college basketball for Bellarmine from 2006 to 2010.

== Coaching career ==
Davenport got his first coaching job in 2010 as a graduate assistant with Xavier. Ahead of the 2012 season, he was hired by Louisville as the director of video operations. In 2015 Davenport was hired as an assistant coach for Eastern Kentucky. In 2016, he joined his alma mater Bellarmine as an assistant coach. Ahead of the 2022 season, Davenport was named the team's head coach in waiting. On March 11, 2025, he was officially promoted to head coach following the retirement of his father, Scott.

== Head coaching record ==
Record table
Season	Team	Overall	Conference	Standing	Postseason
Bellarmine Knights (Atlantic Sun Conference) (2025–present)
2025–26	Bellarmine	13–19	7–11	T–7th	
Bellarmine:		13–19 (.406)	7–11 (.389)		
Total:		13–19 (.406)			
National champion Postseason invitational champion Conference regular season champion Conference regular season and conference tournament champion Division regular season champion Division regular season and conference tournament champion Conference tournament champion

== Personal life ==
He is the son of former Bellarmine head coach Scott Davenport.
