= 2011 NCAA Division II men's basketball tournament =

American college championship

- Teams: 64
- Finals site: MassMutual Center, Springfield, Massachusetts
- Champions: Bellarmine Knights (1st title)
- Runner-up: BYU–Hawaii Seasiders (1st title game)
- Semifinalists: Minnesota State Mavericks (1st Final Four); West Liberty Hilltoppers (1st Final Four)
- Winning coach: Scott Davenport (1st title)
- MOP: Jet Chang (BYU–Hawaii)
- Attendance: 46,323

The 2011 NCAA Division II men's basketball tournament involved 64 schools playing in a single-elimination tournament to determine the national champion of men's NCAA Division II college basketball as a culmination of the 2010–11 basketball season. The winner was Bellarmine; the tournament's Most Outstanding Player was Jet Chang of runner-up BYU–Hawaii, the first player from a losing team to earn that honor in the Division II tournament since 1998.

The 2010 champion Cal Poly Pomona did not qualify for the tournament, while runner-up Indiana (PA) did. Along with Bentley, Midwestern State, and Augusta State, Indiana was one of four teams from the 2010 Elite Eight to qualify.

2011 NCAA Division II Men's sites - regionals (cyan) Elite Eight (red)

== Qualification and tournament format ==
The champions of the 22 Division II basketball conferences qualified automatically. An additional 42 teams were selected as at-large participants by the tournament selection committee. The first three rounds of the tournament were organized in regions comprising eight participants in groups of two or three conferences (two in the Central and Midwest regions). The eight regional winners then met at the Elite Eight for the final three rounds held at the MassMutual Center in Springfield, Massachusetts.

=== Automatic qualifiers ===
The following teams automatically qualified for the tournament as the winner of their conference tournament championships:

Team	Conference	Region
Cal State Dominguez Hills	CCAA	West
Bloomfield	CACC	East
Shaw	CIAA	Atlantic
Limestone	Conference Carolinas	Southeast
C.W. Post	ECC	East
Wayne State (MI)	GLIAC	Midwest
Bellarmine	GLVC	Midwest
Central Washington	GNAC	West
Harding	Gulf South	South
Texas A&M International	Heartland	South Central
Central Oklahoma	Lone Star	South Central
Fort Hays State	MIAA	South Central
Adelphia	Northeast-10	East
Winona State	NSIC	Central
Dixie State	Pacific West	West
Augusta State	Peach Belt	Southeast
Indiana (PA)	PSAC	Atlantic
Fort Lewis	RMAC	Central
Lincoln Memorial	SAC	Southeast
Clark Atlanta	SIAC	South
Rollins	Sunshine State	South
West Liberty	WVIAC	Atlantic

=== Qualified teams ===
Midwest Region – Louisville, Kentucky
Seed	School	Conference	Record	Qualification
#1	Bellarmine	GLVC	27–2	Conference champion
#2	Southern Indiana	GLVC	24–5	At-large
#3	Wayne State (MI)	GLIAC	22–7	Conference champion
#4	Northern Kentucky	GLVC	20–8	At-large
#5	Kentucky Wesleyan	GLVC	19–9	At-large
#6	Ferris State	GLIAC	22–7	At-large
#7	Drury	GLVC	22–7	At-large
#8	Indianapolis	GLVC	19–8	At-large
South Central Region – Edmond, Oklahoma
Seed	School	Conference	Record	Qualification
#1	Central Oklahoma	Lone Star	28–3	Conference champion
#2	Missouri Southern	MIAA	22–8	At-large
#3	Tarleton State	Lone Star	24–5	At-large
#4	Fort Hays State	MIAA	25–6	Conference champion
#5	West Texas A&M	Lone Star	23–6	At-large
#6	Midwestern State	Lone Star	22–8	At-large
#7	Washburn	MIAA	18–9	At-large
#8	Texas A&M International	Heartland	21–9	Conference champion
South Region – Huntsville, Alabama
Seed	School	Conference	Record	Qualification
#1	Alabama–Huntsville	Gulf South	26–4	At-large
#2	Harding	Gulf South	25–4	Conference champion
#3	Rollins	Sunshine State	25–6	Conference champion
#4	Arkansas Tech	Gulf South	24–5	At-large
#5	Benedict	SIAC	21–7	At-large
#6	Florida Southern	Sunshine State	22–8	At-large
#7	Stillman	SIAC	23–7	At-large
#8	Clark Atlanta	SIAC	22–8	Conference champion
Central Region – Mankato, Minnesota
Seed	School	Conference	Record	Qualification
#1	Minnesota State–Mankato	NSIC	24–4	At-large
#2	Fort Lewis	RMAC	22–7	Conference champion
#3	Colorado Mines	RMAC	24–5	At-large
#4	Mary	NSIC	23–5	At-large
#5	Metropolitan State	RMAC	21–7	At-large
#6	Adams State	RMAC	20–8	At-large
#7	Mesa State	RMAC	18–9	At-large
#8	Winona State	NSIC	20–9	Conference champion

Southeast Region – Augusta, Georgia
Seed	School	Conference	Record	Qualification
#1	Augusta State	Peach Belt	28–3	Conference champion
#2	Lincoln Memorial	SAC	27–2	Conference champion
#3	Georgia Southwestern	Peach Belt	20–8	At-large
#4	Queens (NC)	Conference Carolinas	20–7	At-large
#5	Limestone	Conference Carolinas	23–6	Conference champion
#6	Montevallo	Peach Belt	18–10	At-large
#7	Anderson (SC)	SAC	18–11	At-large
#8	UNC Pembroke	Peach Belt	18–11	At-large
Atlantic Region – West Liberty, West Virginia
Seed	School	Conference	Record	Qualification
#1	West Liberty	WVIAC	29–0	Conference champion
#2	Indiana (PA)	PSAC	24–5	Conference champion
#3	Bowie State	CIAA	22–5	At-large
#4	Shaw	CIAA	22–8	Conference champion
#5	Winston-Salem State	CIAA	19–7	At-large
#6	Mansfield	PSAC	18–9	At-large
#7	West Virginia Wesleyan	WVIAC	19–10	At-large
#8	Slippery Rock	PSAC	21–10	At-large
West Region – Ellensburg, Washington
Seed	School	Conference	Record	Qualification
#1	Central Washington	GNAC	26–3	Conference champion
#2	Cal State Dominguez Hills	CCAA	23–6	Conference champion
#3	Humboldt State	CCAA	26–3	At-large
#4	Dixie State	Pacific West	20–6	Conference champion
#5	Chaminade	Pacific West	20–8	At-large
#6	Alaska Anchorage	GNAC	23–9	At-large
#7	BYU–Hawaii	Pacific West	17–8	At-large
#8	Seattle Pacific	GNAC	19–9	At-large
East Region – Waltham, Massachusetts
Seed	School	Conference	Record	Qualification
#1	Bentley	NE-10	22–7	At-large
#2	American International	NE-10	20–8	At-large
#3	Stonehill	NE-10	21–7	At-large
#4	UMass Lowell	NE-10	20–9	At-large
#5	Saint Rose	NE-10	21–8	At-large
#6	Adelphi	NE-10	20–10	Conference champion
#7	Bloomfield	CACC	21–8	Conference champion
#8	C.W. Post	ECC	21–9	Conference champion

== Regionals ==
=== Midwest – Louisville, Kentucky ===
Location: Knights Hall Host: Bellarmine University

First round Round of 64; March 12
1	Bellarmine (27–2)	84
8	Indianapolis (19–8)	70
4	Northern Kentucky (20–8)	76
5	Kentucky Wesleyan (19–9)	74
3	Wayne State (MI) (22–7)	88
6	Ferris State (22–7)	90
7	Drury (22–7)	65
2	Southern Indiana (24–5)	64

Regional semifinal Round of 32; March 13
1	Bellarmine	87
4	Northern Kentucky	82
6	Ferris State	83
7	Drury	76

Regional Final; Sweet 16; March 15
1	Bellarmine	86
6	Ferris State	66

=== South Central – Edmond, Oklahoma ===
Location: Hamilton Field House Host: University of Central Oklahoma

First round Round of 64; March 12
1	Central Oklahoma (28–3)	79
8	Texas A&M Int'l. (21–9)	70
4	Fort Hays State (25–6)	75
5	West Texas A&M (23–6)	49
3	Tarleton State (24–5)	51
6	Midwestern State (22–8)	64
2	Missouri Southern (22–8)	82
7	Washburn (18–9)	79

Regional semifinal Round of 32; March 13
1	Central Oklahoma	81
4	Fort Hays State	69
6	Midwestern State	75
2	Missouri Southern	52

Regional Final; Sweet 16; March 15
1	Central Oklahoma	66
6	Midwestern State	73

=== South – Huntsville, Alabama ===
Location: Spragins Hall Host: University of Alabama in Huntsville

First round Round of 64; March 12
1	Alabama–Huntsville (26–4)	77
8	Clark Atlanta (22–8)	63
4	Arkansas Tech (24–5)	61
5	Benedict (21–7)	58
3	Rollins (25–6)	74
6	Florida Southern (22–8)	76
2	Harding (25–4)	86
7	Stillman (23–7)	87

Regional semifinal Round of 32; March 13
1	Alabama–Huntsville	74
4	Arkansas Tech	71
6	Florida Southern	86
7	Stillman	92

Regional Final; Sweet 16; March 15
1	Alabama–Huntsville	88
7	Stillman	81

=== Central – Mankato, Minnesota ===
Location: Taylor Center Host: Minnesota State University, Mankato

First round Round of 64; March 12
1	MN State Mankato (24–4)	96
8	Winona State (20–9)	81
4	Mary (23–5)	73
5	Metro State (21–7)	78
3	Colorado Mines (24–5)	62
6	Adams State (20–8)	59
2	Fort Lewis (22–7)	76
7	Mesa State (18–9)	55

Regional semifinal Round of 32; March 13
1	MN State Mankato	69
5	Metro State	65
3	Colorado Mines	65
2	Fort Lewis	77

Regional Final; Sweet 16; March 15
1	MN State Mankato	81
2	Fort Lewis	63

=== Southeast – Augusta, Georgia ===
Location: Christenberry Fieldhouse Host: Augusta State University

First round Round of 64; March 12
1	Augusta State (28–3)	80
8	UNC Pembroke (18–11)	66
4	Queens (NC) (20–7)	70
5	Limestone (23–6)	67
3	Ga. Southwestern (20–8)	59
6	Montevallo (18–10)	62
7	Anderson (SC) (18–11)	91
2	Lincoln Memorial (27–2)	86

Regional semifinal Round of 32; March 13
1	Augusta State	71
4	Queens (NC)	60
6	Montevallo	76
7	Anderson (SC)	82

Regional Final; Sweet 16; March 15
1	Augusta State	73
7	Anderson (SC)	75

=== Atlantic – West Liberty, West Virginia ===
Location: Academic, Sports, and Recreation Complex Host: West Liberty University

First round Round of 64; March 12
1	West Liberty (29–0)	117
8	Slippery Rock (21–10)	73
4	Shaw (22–8)	75
5	Winston-Salem (19–7)	47
3	Bowie State (22–5)	79
6	Mansfield (18–9)	59
2	Indiana (PA) (24–5)	66
7	WV Wesleyan (19–10)	59

Regional semifinal Round of 32; March 13
1	West Liberty	98
4	Shaw	93
3	Bowie State	81
2	Indiana (PA)	94

Regional Final; Sweet 16; March 15
1	West Liberty	89
2	Indiana (PA)	86

=== West – Ellensburg, Washington ===
Location: Nicholson Pavilion Host: Central Washington University

First round Round of 64; March 11
1	Central Washington (26–3)	63
8	Seattle Pacific (19–9)	76
4	Dixie State (20–6)	92
5	Chaminade (20–8)	81
3	Humboldt State (26–3)	70
6	Alaska Anchorage (23–9)	76
7	BYU–Hawaii (17-8)	83
2	Cal. St. Dom. Hills (23-6)	76

Regional semifinal Round of 32; March 12
8	Seattle Pacific	73
4	Dixie State	75
6	Alaska Anchorage	91
7	BYU–Hawaii	100

Regional Final; Sweet 16; March 14
4	Dixie State	73
7	BYU–Hawaii	79

=== East – Waltham, Massachusetts ===
Location: Dana Center Host: Bentley College

First round Round of 64; March 12
1	Bentley (22–7)	74
8	C.W. Post (21–9)	60
4	UMass Lowell (20–9)	68
5	St. Rose (21–8)	81
3	Stonehill (21–7)	73
6	Adelphi (20-10)	64
2	American Int'l. (20–8)	96
7	Bloomfield (21–8)	100

Regional semifinal Round of 32; March 13
1	Bentley	76
5	St. Rose	63
3	Stonehill	66
7	Bloomfield	79

Regional Final; Sweet 16; March 15
1	Bentley	71
7	Bloomfield	75

== Elite Eight – Springfield, Massachusetts ==
Location: MassMutual Center Hosts: American International College and Naismith Memorial Basketball Hall of Fame

National Quarterfinals; Elite Eight; Wednesday, March 23
M1	Bellarmine (30–2)	70
SC6	Midwestern State (25–8)	64
S1	Alabama–Huntsville (29–4)	91
C1	Minn. State–Mankato (27–4)	95
SE7	Anderson, SC (21–11)	95
A1	West Liberty (32–0)	113
W7	BYU–Hawaii (20–8)	96
E7	Bloomfield (24–8)	89

National semifinals Final Four; Thursday, March 24
MW1	Bellarmine	81
C1	Minn. State–Mankato	74
A1	West Liberty	101
W7	BYU–Hawaii	110

National Championship; Saturday, March 26
MW1	Bellarmine	71
W7	BYU–Hawaii	68

== All-tournament team ==
- Justin Benedetti (Bellarmine)
- Jet Chang (BYU–Hawai'i)
- Jeremy Kendle (Bellarmine)
- Jefferson Mason (Minnesota State–Mankato)
- Corey Pelle (West Liberty)
