= Scott Davenport =

American college basketball coach

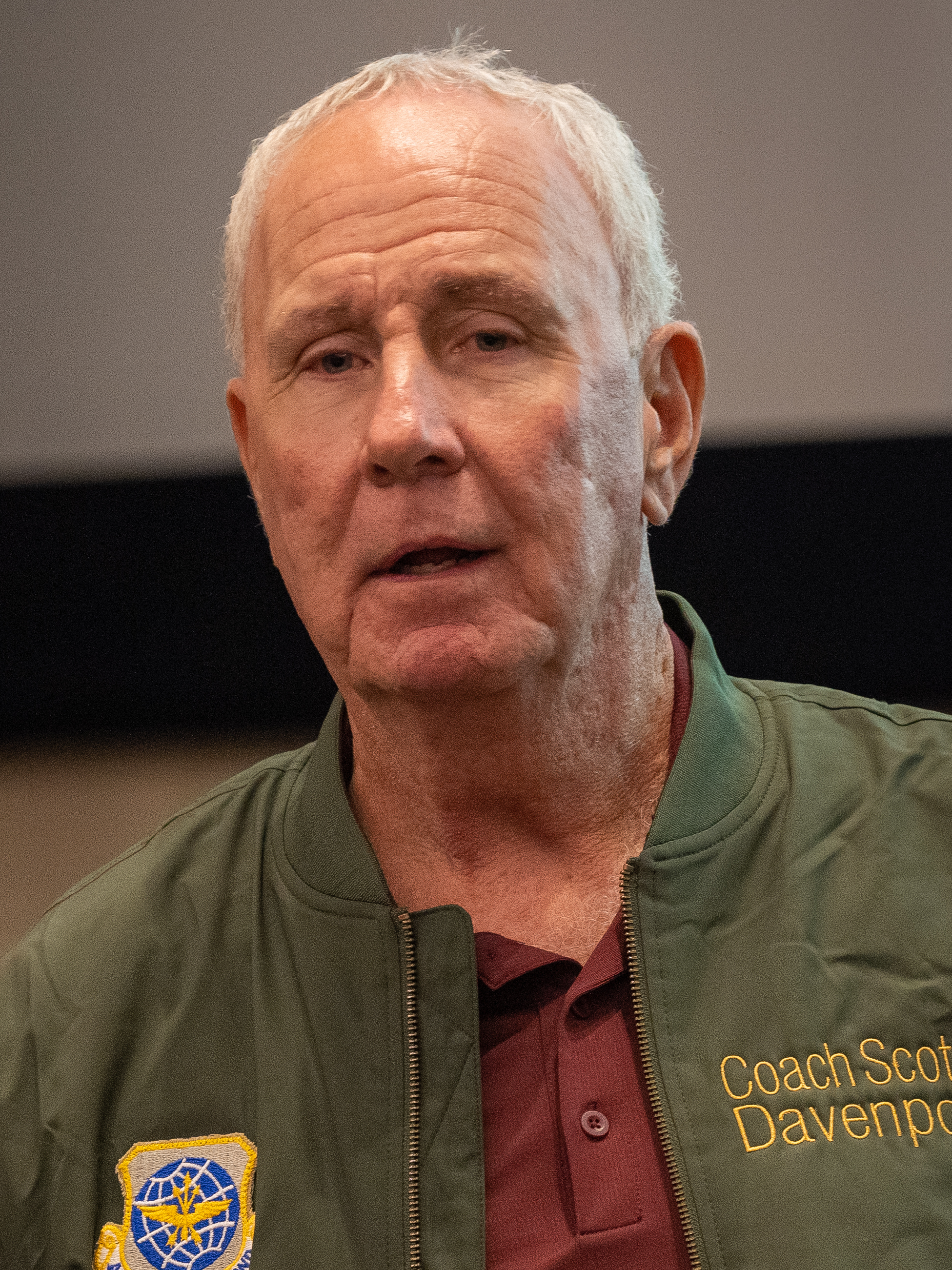
- Davenport in 2023

Biographical details
- Born: January 25, 1957/1958; Louisville, Kentucky, U.S.
- Education: Louisville ('84)

Coaching career (HC unless noted)
- 1984–1985: Louisville (grad assistant)
- 1985–1986: VCU (assistant)
- 1986–1996: Ballard HS
- 1996–2005: Louisville (assistant)
- 2005–2025: Bellarmine

Head coaching record
- Overall: 423–192 (.688)
- Tournaments: 26–10 (NCAA DII); 1–1 (CBI)

Accomplishments and honors

Championships
- NCAA Division II tournament (2011); 6 GLVC regular season (2011, 2012, 2015–2018); ASUN tournament (2022)

Awards
- NABC Division II Coach of the Year (2011); 4× GLVC Coach of the Year (2011, 2012, 2017, 2018)

Scott Davenport, also known as "Scotty" (born January 25, 1957/1958), is an American former college basketball coach. He is best known as the former head men's basketball coach at Bellarmine University for 20 years.

== Early life ==
Davenport, a native of Bellarmine's home city of Louisville, Kentucky, grew up less than a mile from Churchill Downs in the city's South End, an area described by Sports Illustrated writer (and Louisville resident) Pat Forde as "gritty". His father died of a heart attack when he was 9 years old, and he was raised from that point by his mother, a hair stylist who had a sixth-grade education. According to Forde, Davenport "was not blessed with abundant athletic talent, but had an unquenchable love of basketball", playing at nearby Iroquois High School.

== Coaching career ==
Davenport began his coaching career as a graduate assistant coach under Denny Crum at Louisville in 1984. He then moved on to VCU for one season as an assistant to Mike Pollio. He returned to the Louisville area as a high school head coach at Ballard High School where he stayed for 10 seasons from 1986 to 1996. In his first two Ballard seasons, he led the Bruins to the state tournament finals, both against a Clay County team led by future Kentucky star Richie Farmer. The Bruins, featuring future NBA player Allan Houston in both seasons, lost in overtime in 1987 and survived a 51-point game by Farmer to win in 1988. Davenport later coached another future NBA player in DeJuan Wheat. Davenport returned to the Cardinals under Crum in 1996, and would stay on as an assistant coach for Rick Pitino. When Pitino took over from Crum in 2001, he gave Davenport, who then weighed 249 pounds (113 kg), an ultimatum to lose weight; Pitino reminded Davenport of the loss of his father, telling him, "Think of all the things your dad never got to see you do." Within a year, he had lost 78 pounds (35 kg), and has remained at his new weight ever since. Davenport remained at Louisville until 2005, when he accepted the head coaching job at Bellarmine.

Since joining the Knights, Davenport has become the all-time wins leader at the school, and has led the team to six Great Lakes Valley Conference regular season titles and five conference tournament titles, along with 12 NCAA Division II men's basketball tournaments which includes four Final Four appearances (2011, 2012, 2015, 2017), and the 2011 national title.

After a 2021–22 season in which the Knights won the ASUN Conference tournament, Bellarmine named his son Doug, who had played at Bellarmine from 2006 to 2010 and joined the Knights coaching staff in 2016, as his designated successor upon his eventual retirement. Davenport officially announced his retirement on March 10, 2025.

== Personality ==
In a 2020 story for SI, Forde had this to say about Davenport's personality:

The coach doesn't just wear his emotions on his sleeve; he wears them on his trousers, his collar, his forehead ... everywhere. North Carolina coach Roy Williams has declared himself the corniest man in college basketball, but he better make room for the new guy. The guy whose ring tone on his phone is "One Shining Moment". The Louisville lifer who will tell stories for hours about growing up here and wanting to make his hometown proud.

== Head coaching record ==
=== College ===
Record table
Season	Team	Overall	Conference	Standing	Postseason
Bellarmine Knights (Great Lakes Valley Conference) (2005–2020)
2005–06	Bellarmine	14–14	11–8	3rd (East)	
2006–07	Bellarmine	12–15	11–8	5th (East)	
2007–08	Bellarmine	14–14	11–8	T–3rd (East)	
2008–09	Bellarmine	26–7	13–5	2nd (East)	NCAA DII Sweet Sixteen
2009–10	Bellarmine	23–9	12–6	3rd (East)	NCAA DII second round
2010–11	Bellarmine	33–2	17–1	1st (East)	NCAA DII national champions
2011–12	Bellarmine	29–4	16–2	1st (East)	NCAA DII Final Four
2012–13	Bellarmine	24–8	12–6	T–3rd (East)	NCAA DII Sweet Sixteen
2013–14	Bellarmine	23–8	12–6	3rd (East)	NCAA DII first round
2014–15	Bellarmine	31–4	17–1	T–1st (East)	NCAA DII Final Four
2015–16	Bellarmine	23–7	15–3	T–1st (East)	NCAA DII first round
2016–17	Bellarmine	32–4	17–1	1st (East)	NCAA DII Final Four
2017–18	Bellarmine	29–3	16–2	1st (East)	NCAA DII second round
2018–19	Bellarmine	28–5	14–4	2nd	NCAA DII Sweet Sixteen
2019–20	Bellarmine	20–8	13–7	5th	
Bellarmine Knights (ASUN Conference) (2020–2025)
2020–21	Bellarmine	14–8	10–3	2nd	CBI semifinal
2021–22	Bellarmine	20–13	11–5	2nd (West)	
2022–23	Bellarmine	15–18	9–9	T–7th	
2023–24	Bellarmine	8–23	4–12	12th	
2024–25	Bellarmine	5–26	2–16	12th	
Bellarmine:		423–192 (.688)	236–107 (.688)		
Total:		423–192 (.688)			
National champion Postseason invitational champion Conference regular season champion Conference regular season and conference tournament champion Division regular season champion Division regular season and conference tournament champion Conference tournament champion
