= Long Reach High School =

Public high school in Columbia, Maryland, U.S.

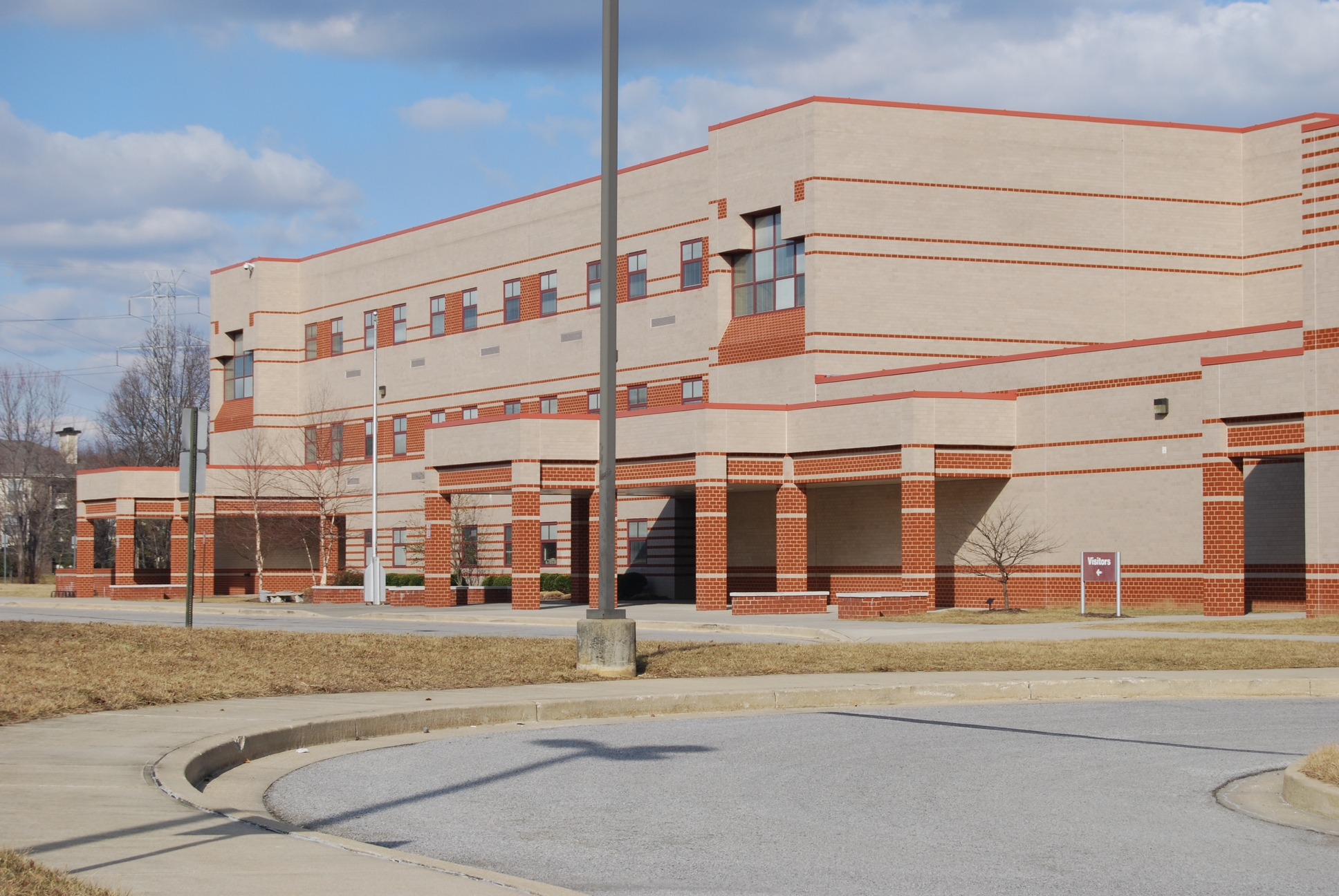

Location
- 6101 Old Dobbin Lane; Columbia, Maryland 21045; United States; 39°12′22″N 76°48′40″W

Information
- Type: Public high school
- Established: 1996; 30 years ago
- Principal: Lynette Moore
- Enrollment: 1,600 (2017)
- Colors: Purple, Silver, White, Black
- Mascot: The Lightning
- Rival: Howard High School
- Website: lrhs.hcpss.org

Long Reach High School is a public high school located in Columbia, Maryland, United States. It is part of the Howard County Public School System.

== History ==
In 1995, Long Reach High School was built in Columbia, Maryland. The school was one of three new county schools opened in 1996 after a 16-year gap. Some of the principals that have served at Long Reach High School include: Dr. Elizabeth Franks, Mr. Edmund Evans, Mr. David Burton, Mr. Josh Wasilewski, and Mr. Adam Eldridge.

== Notable alumni ==
- Ron'Dell Carter, USFL player
- Brent Faiyaz, R&B singer
- Ian Jones-Quartey, animator
- Darryl Webb, basketball player
- Aidan West, Los Angeles Dodgers player
- KeiLyn Durrel Jones, actor

== See also ==
- Howard County Public School System
