= Ron'Dell Carter =

American football player (born 1997)

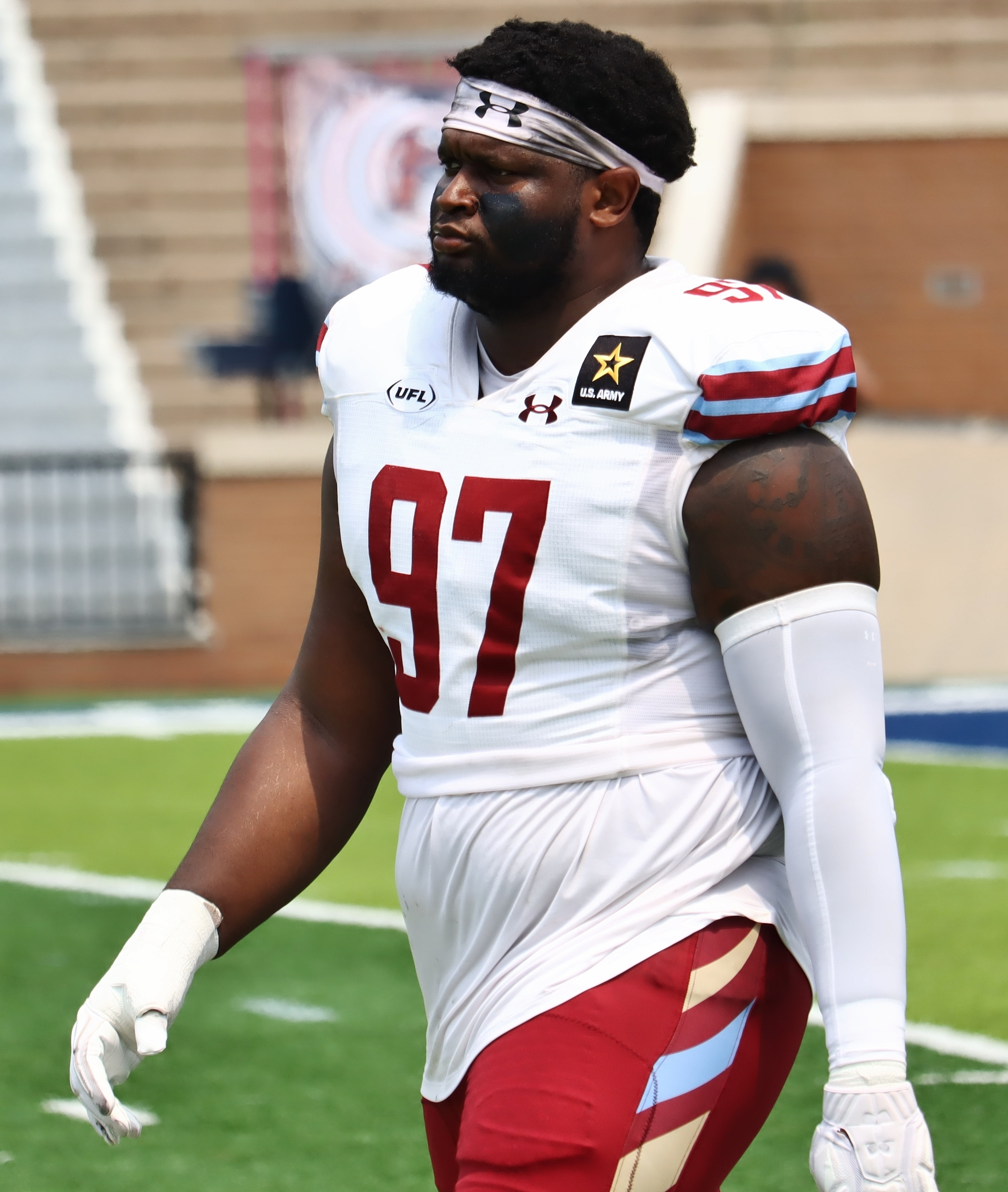
- Carter with the Michigan Panthers in 2024

Profile
- Position: Defensive end

Personal information
- Born: July 3, 1997 (age 29); Baltimore, Maryland, U.S.
- Listed height: 6 ft 3 in (1.91 m)
- Listed weight: 269 lb (122 kg)

Career information
- High school: Long Reach (MD)
- College: Rutgers (2016); James Madison (2017–2019)
- NFL draft: 2020: undrafted

Career history
- Dallas Cowboys (2020)*; Indianapolis Colts (2020); Dallas Cowboys (2020); Arizona Cardinals (2021)*; Houston Texans (2021); Arizona Cardinals (2022)*; Pittsburgh Steelers (2022)*; New England Patriots (2022)*; Michigan Panthers (2023–2025)
- * Offseason or practice squad member only

Awards and highlights
- CAA Defensive Player of the Year (2019); ECAC FCS Defensive Player of the Year (2019); FCS All-American (2019); 2× All-CAA (2018, 2019); 2× All-ECAC (2018, 2019)

Career NFL statistics
- Total tackles: 1
- Stats at Pro Football Reference

Ron'Dell Lamaree Carter (born July 3, 1997) is an American football defensive end. He played college football at James Madison after transferring from Rutgers in 2017.

== Early life ==
Carter attended Long Reach High School. He was a two-way player at defensive end and tight end. As a junior, he received All-Howard County honors at defensive end. As a senior, he received All-Howard County honors at tight end.

He also practiced basketball and competed in the shot put.

== College career ==
Carter accepted a football scholarship from Rutgers University. As a redshirt freshman, he appeared in five games, making two tackles and half a sack. He transferred after the season to James Madison University.

As a sophomore, he appeared in all 15 games as a reserve player, tallying 28 tackles (eight for loss), four sacks, four quarterback hurries and three pass breakups. He had four tackles against Norfolk State University.

As a junior, he started in all 13 games, collecting 58 tackles (13 for loss), 7.5 sacks, one quarterback hurry, one forced fumble and one fumble recovery. He had seven tackles (three for loss) in the season opener against North Carolina State University. He made 10 tackles (one for loss), one forced fumble and one fumble recovery in the FCS Second Round at Colgate University.

As a senior, he started in all 16 games at defensive end, registering 66 tackles, 27 tackles for loss (second in the CAA), 12 sacks (tied for third in school history), 13 quarterback hurries, one pass breakup and one forced fumble. He had 10 tackles (six for loss) against the College of William & Mary. He made seven tackles (1.5 for loss) and a half sack in the national championship game against North Dakota State University.

== Professional career ==
Pre-draft measurables
Height	Weight	Arm length	Hand span
6 ft 2 5/8 in (1.90 m)	265 lb (120 kg)	33 1/2 in (0.85 m)	9 1/2 in (0.24 m)
All values from Pro Day

=== Dallas Cowboys ===
Carter was signed as an undrafted free agent by the Dallas Cowboys after the 2020 NFL draft on April 27. He was given a $145,000 guarantee in his contract to convince him to sign with the team. He was switched to a 3-technique defensive tackle during training camp. On September 5, he was waived during final roster cuts and signed to the practice squad the next day.

=== Indianapolis Colts ===
On September 30, 2020, the Indianapolis Colts signed Carter off the Cowboys' practice squad. He was declared inactive in the 5 games he spent on the active roster. Carter was waived by the Colts on November 10, 2020.

=== Dallas Cowboys (second stint) ===
On November 11, 2020, Carter was claimed off waivers by the Dallas Cowboys. He signed a contract extension with the Cowboys on March 10, 2021. He was waived by the Cowboys on August 30, 2021.

=== Arizona Cardinals ===
On September 3, 2021, Carter was signed to the Arizona Cardinals practice squad.

=== Houston Texans ===
On December 21, 2021, Carter was signed by the Houston Texans off the Cardinals practice squad. He appeared in one game as a backup player. On December 29, the Texans signed Carter to a one-year extension that runs through the 2022 season. On April 25, 2022, the Texans waived Carter.

=== Arizona Cardinals (second stint) ===
On April 26, 2022, Carter was claimed off waivers by the Arizona Cardinals. He was waived on May 16.

=== Pittsburgh Steelers ===
On August 8, 2022, Carter signed with the Pittsburgh Steelers. He was waived on August 30.

=== New England Patriots ===
On October 19, 2022, Carter was signed to the New England Patriots practice squad. He was released on November 1.

=== Michigan Panthers ===
On March 22, 2023, Carter signed with the Michigan Panthers of the United States Football League (USFL). He was placed on injured reserve on May 9, 2023. He appeared in five games with five starts, making four tackles and one sack. He was re-signed by the team on August 16, 2024.
