= Darryl Webb =

American basketball player (born 1988)

Personal information
- Born: January 16, 1988 (age 38) Elkridge, Maryland, U.S.
- Listed height: 6 ft 6 in (1.98 m)
- Listed weight: 220 lb (100 kg)

Career information
- High school: Long Reach (Columbia, Maryland)
- College: Indiana (PA) (2007–2011)
- NBA draft: 2011: undrafted
- Playing career: 2011–2015
- Position: Small forward / power forward
- Number: 15

Career history
- 2011–2012: Crailsheim Merlins
- 2012–2013: Landstede Zwolle
- 2013–2014: Hitachi SunRockers
- 2014–2015: Monthey
- 2015: Mitteldeutscher BC

Career highlights
- DBL rebounding leader (2013); NABC Division II Player of the Year (2011); 2x PSAC West Player of the Year (2009, 2010); PSAC West Freshman of the Year (2008); No. 15 retired by IUP Crimson Hawks

Darryl Webb (born January 16, 1988) is an American former professional basketball player. Webb played for the IUP Crimson Hawks. He also played professionally in Germany, the Netherlands, Japan and Switzerland.

== Early years ==
Webb graduated in 2006 at Long Reach High School in Maryland ranked second in school history with 950 points and first with 650 rebounds at the time of his graduation. He set school mark with 25 rebounds in one game and helped lead the team to a state championship his senior year when he was selected as the Howard County Player of the Year.

== College career ==
=== 2007–08 season ===
Webb started all 28 games for the Crimson Hawks. He was a redshirt his freshman year, PSAC West Freshman of the Year and second team all-conference honors. Webb put in a season-high 26 points vs. Shippensburg and had 12 or more rebounds in eight games. He finished his freshman year averaging 16.5 pts, 8.5 rebounds.

=== 2008–09 season ===
In his sophomore season Webb played in all 30 games with 28 starts and was named first team All-PSAC West, ranked fourth in the PSAC and 23rd in the nation with an average of 9.2 rebounds per game. He was also ranked ninth in the conference in field goal percentage at 51.8 percent. He averaged 12.8 points per game and reached double figures 21 times and had 11 double-doubles. On November 29, 2008 he pulled down a career-high 19 boards vs. Shippensburg and had 15 or more rebounds in a total of six games.

=== 2009–10 season ===
In Webb's junior year he became the first IUP men's basketball player named to an All-America team since 2002 when he was honored by both the National Association of Basketball Coaches and the Division II Bulletin. Webb started all 36 games for the Crimson Hawks, and set a school single-season record with 376 rebounds and his average of 10.4 per game being ranked 13th in the country. He was named first team All-PSAC West for the second straight year and selected MVP of the Atlantic Region tournament after matching his career high with 27 points while grabbing 12 rebounds in the championship game.

== Professional career ==
On August 22, 2012, Webb signed with Landstede Basketbal of the Dutch Basketball League.

On July 28, 2013, Webb signed with the Hitachi Sunrockers of the Japanese bj league.

For the 2014–15 season, Webb signed with BBC Monthey of the Swiss Championnat LNA. On February 6, Webb left Monthey.

On February 12, 2015, Webb signed with Mitteldeutscher BC of the German Basketball Bundesliga for the remainder of the season.
