= 2010 NCAA Division II men's basketball tournament =

2010 college basketball tournament

- Teams: 64
- Finals site: MassMutual Center, Springfield, Massachusetts
- Champions: Cal Poly Pomona Broncos (1st title)
- Runner-up: Indiana (PA) Crimson Hawks (1st title game)
- Semifinalists: St. Cloud State Huskies (1st Final Four); Bentley Falcons (2nd Final Four)
- Winning coach: Greg Kamansky (1st title)
- MOP: Austin Swift (Cal Poly Pomona)
- Attendance: 45,539

The 2010 NCAA Division II men's basketball tournament involved 64 schools playing in a single-elimination tournament to determine the national champion of men's NCAA Division II college basketball as a culmination of the 2009–10 basketball season. It began on March 13, 2010. The tournament was won by the California State Polytechnic University, Pomona (Cal Poly Pomona) men's basketball team, which defeated Indiana University of Pennsylvania, 65–53, in the title game. The championship was the first in the Broncos' history after ending runner-up in 2009.

2010 NCAA Division II Men's sites - regionals (cyan) Elite Eight (red)

== Regionals ==
=== Central – Mankato, Minnesota ===
Location: Taylor Center Host: Minnesota State University, Mankato

First round Round of 64; March 13
1	Minnesota St. Mankato	84
8	Colorado Mines	80
5	Metropolitan State	77
4	St. Cloud State	82
3	Augustana (S.D.)	87
6	New Mexico Highlands	73
2	Mesa State	73
7	Winona State	68

Regional semifinal Round of 32; March 14
1	Minnesota St. Mankato	71
4	St. Cloud State	82
3	Augustana (S.D.)	95
2	Mesa State	84

Regional Final; Sweet 16; March 16
4	St. Cloud State	84 OT
3	Augustana (S.D.)	75

=== South Central – Wichita Falls, Texas ===
Location: D.L. Ligon Coliseum Host: Midwestern State University

First round Round of 64; March 13
1	Midwestern State	91
8	Incarnate Word	71
4	Tarleton State	75
5	Nebraska-Omaha	71
3	Fort Hays State	80
6	Central Oklahoma	64
2	Central Missouri	78
7	Missouri Western St	59

Regional semifinal Round of 32; March 14
1	Midwestern State	71
4	Tarleton State	56
3	Fort Hays State	73
2	Central Missouri	80

Regional Final; Sweet 16; March 16
1	Midwestern State	60
2	Central Missouri	59

=== Atlantic – Indiana, Pennsylvania ===
Location: Memorial Field House Host: Indiana University of Pennsylvania

First round Round of 64; March 13
1	Indiana (PA)	71
8	Fairmont State	67
4	West Virginia St.	89
5	East Stroudsburg	79
3	St. Augustine's	70
6	Kutztown	54
2	West Liberty	79
7	Alderson–Broaddus	66

Regional semifinal Round of 32; March 14
1	Indiana (PA)	91
4	West Virginia St.	76
3	St. Augustine's	83
2	West Liberty	90

Regional Final; Sweet 16; March 16
1	Indiana (PA)	84
2	West Liberty	72

=== South – Russellville, Arkansas ===
Location: Tucker Coliseum Host: Arkansas Tech University

First round Round of 64; March 13
1	Arkansas Tech	92
8	Tuskegee	58
4	Valdosta State	74
5	Clark Atlanta	67
3	Florida Southern	59
6	Barry	64
2	Rollins	59 OT
7	Alabama-Huntsville	57

Regional semifinal Round of 32; March 14
1	Arkansas Tech	60
4	Valdosta State	72
6	Barry	71
2	Rollins	74

Regional Final; Sweet 16; March 16
4	Valdosta State	71
2	Rollins	58

=== Midwest – Owensboro, Kentucky ===
Location: Owensboro Sportscenter Host: Kentucky Wesleyan College

First round Round of 64; March 13
1	Kentucky Wesleyan	70
8	St. Joseph's (IN)	72
4	Findlay	56
5	Grand Valley State	68
3	Drury	58
6	Quincy	71
2	Bellarmine	70
7	Central State (OH)	66

Regional semifinal Round of 32; March 14
8	St. Joseph's (IN)	78
5	Grand Valley St.	76
6	Quincy	66
2	Bellarmine	61

Regional Final; Sweet 16; March 16
8	St. Joseph's (IN)	104
6	Quincy	103

=== West – Bellingham, Washington ===
Location: Sam Carver Gymnasium Host: Western Washington University

First round Round of 64; March 12
1	Western Washington	84
8	Central Washington	70
4	Cal Poly Pomona	71
5	Dixie State	62
3	Seattle Pacific	72
6	BYU-Hawaii	76
2	Cal State San Bernardino	75
7	Humboldt State	66

Regional semifinal Round of 32; March 13
1	Western Washington	75
4	Cal Poly Pomona	76
6	BYU-Hawaii	77
2	CSUSB	58

Regional Final; Sweet 16; March 15
4	Cal Poly Pomona	78
6	BYU-Hawaii	75

=== East – North Easton, Massachusetts ===
Location: Merkert Gymnasium Host: Stonehill College

First round Round of 64; March 13
1	Stonehill	75
8	Felician	52
4	Philadelphia Univ.	89
5	St. Anselm	85
3	Merrimack	81
6	UMass Lowell	62
2	Bentley	60
7	Bridgeport	50

Regional semifinal Round of 32; March 14
1	Stonehill	69
4	Philadelphia Univ.	71
3	Merrimack	79
2	Bentley	83

Regional Final; Sweet 16; March 16
4	Philadelphia Univ.	69
2	Bentley	81

=== Southeast – Augusta, Georgia ===
Location: Christenberry Fieldhouse Host: Augusta State University

First round Round of 64; March 13
1	Augusta State	91
8	Brevard	73
4	Catawba	66
5	Anderson (SC)	68
3	Georgia College	46
6	USC Aiken	50
2	Mount Olive	70
7	Montevallo	84

Regional semifinal Round of 32; March 14
1	Augusta State	100
5	Anderson (SC)	70
6	USC Aiken	71
7	Montevallo	88

Regional Final; Sweet 16; March 16
1	Augusta State	79
7	Montevallo	71

== Elite Eight – Springfield, Massachusetts ==
Location: MassMutual Center Hosts: American International College and Naismith Memorial Basketball Hall of Fame

National Quarterfinals; Elite Eight; March 24
C4	St. Cloud State	92
SC1	Midwestern State	88
A1	Indiana (PA)	80
S4	Valdosta State	64
M8	St. Joseph's (IN)	48
W4	Cal Poly Pomona	69
E2	Bentley	67
SE1	Augusta State	64

National semifinals Final Four; March 25
C4	St. Cloud State	70
A1	Indiana (PA)	76
W4	Cal Poly Pomona	71
E2	Bentley	63

National Championship; March 27
A1	Indiana (PA)	53
W4	Cal Poly Pomona	65

== Game summaries ==
=== National Championship Game ===
Teams	1st Half	2nd Half	OT	Final
-	–	–	–	–
-	–	–	–	–

== All-tournament team ==
- Dahir Nasser (Cal Poly-Pomona)
- Matt Schneck (Saint Cloud State)
- Austin Swift (Cal Poly-Pomona)
- Darryl Webb (Indiana University of Pennsylvania)
- Taylor Witt (Saint Cloud State)

== See also ==
- 2010 NCAA Division II women's basketball tournament
- 2010 NCAA Division I men's basketball tournament
- 2010 NCAA Division III men's basketball tournament
- 2010 NAIA Division I men's basketball tournament
- 2010 NAIA Division II men's basketball tournament

== Sources ==
- "2010 NCAA Division II Men's Basketball Championship" (PDF). CBS Sports. 2010. Archived (PDF) from the original on March 31, 2010.
- 2010 NCAA Men's Basketball Championship Tournament Records and Statistics: Division II men's basketball Championship
