= Incarnate Word Cardinals men's basketball =

University basketball team

2026–27 Incarnate Word Cardinals men's basketball team
- University: University of the Incarnate Word
- Head coach: Shane Heirman (4th season)
- Location: San Antonio, Texas
- Arena: McDermott Convocation Center (capacity: 2,000)
- Conference: Southland
- Nickname: Cardinals
- Colors: Red, white, and black
- All-time record: 551–371 (.598)

NCAA Division II tournament round of 32
- 2002

NCAA Division II tournament appearances
- 2002, 2009, 2010

NAIA tournament appearances
- 1993, 1994, 1995, 1997, 1998, 1999

Conference tournament champions
- Heartland: 2009, 2010; Heart of Texas: 1995, 1997, 1998, 1999

Conference regular-season champions
- Heartland: 2002, 2009, 2010; Heart of Texas: 1993, 1994, 1995, 1996, 1998, 1999
- * at Division II level

The Incarnate Word Cardinals men's basketball team represents the University of the Incarnate Word in San Antonio, Texas, United States. They are currently led by second-year head coach Shane Heirman. The Cardinals have never appeared in the NCAA Division I men's basketball tournament.

Beginning in 2013, the Cardinals made the jump to NCAA Division I and joined the Southland Conference. As part of their transition from Division II to Division I, they were not eligible for postseason play until 2018. They play their home games at the McDermott Convocation Center.

== Conference affiliations ==
- 1980–81 to 1986–87 – NAIA Independent
- 1987–88 to 1998–99 – Heart of Texas Conference
- 1999–2000 – NCAA Division II Independent
- 2000–01 to 2009–10 – Heartland Conference
- 2010–11 to 2012–13 – Lone Star Conference
- 2013–14 to Present – Southland Conference

== Postseason ==
=== CBI results ===
The Cardinals have participated in one College Basketball Invitational (CBI) tournament. Their record is 2–1.

Year	Round	Opponent	Result
2025	First Round; Quarterfinals; Semifinals	Manhattan; Jacksonville; Illinois State	W 92–85; W 87–72; L 73–78

=== CIT results ===
The Cardinals have appeared in the CollegeInsider.com Postseason Tournament (CIT) one time. They have a record of 0–1. The 2015 CIT was their first postseason appearance since joining Division I.

Year	Round	Opponent	Result
2015	First round	Louisiana–Lafayette	L 68–83

=== NCAA Division II tournament results ===
The Cardinals have appeared in the NCAA Division II tournament three times. Their combined record is 1–3.

Year	Round	Opponent	Result
2002	Regional Quarterfinals	Tarleton State	W 72–59
2002	Regional semifinals	Northwest Missouri State	L 56–61
2009	Regional Quarterfinals	Midwestern State	L 82–87
2010	Regional Quarterfinals	Midwestern State	L 71–91
