= Shane Heirman =

American basketball player and coach (born 1988)

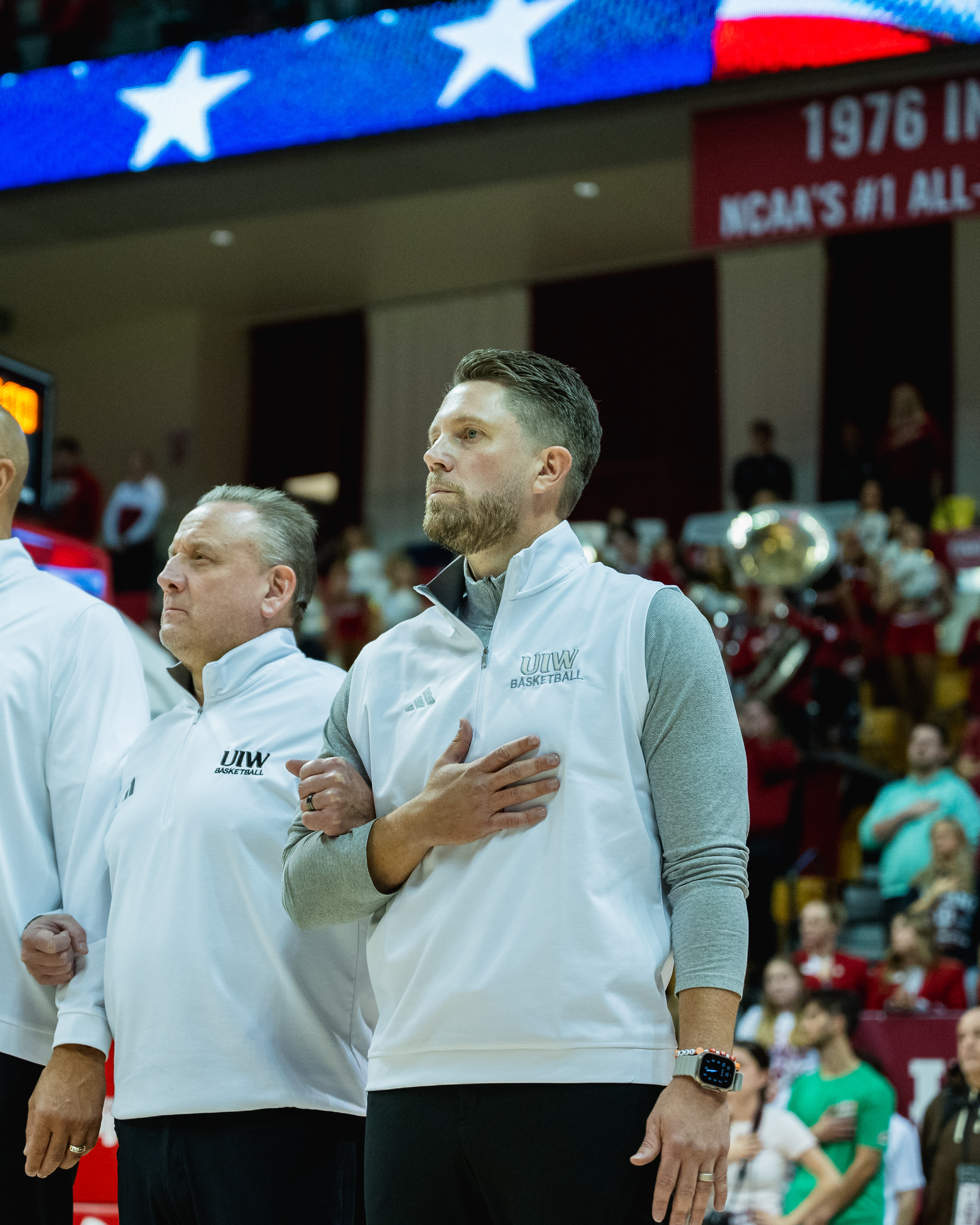

Current position
- Title: Head coach
- Team: Incarnate Word
- Conference: Southland Conference
- Record: 39–59 (.398)

Biographical details
- Born: May 24, 1988 (age 38); Mishawaka, Indiana, U.S.

Playing career
- 2008–2011: Tulsa

Coaching career (HC unless noted)
- 2012–2014: La Lumiere School (associate head coach)
- 2014–2017: La Lumiere School
- 2017–2021: DePaul (assistant)
- 2021–2023: Central Michigan (associate head coach)
- 2023–present: Incarnate Word

Head coaching record
- Overall: 39–59 (.398) (college); 82–7 (.921) (high school)
- Tournaments: 2–1 (CBI)

Shane Heirman (born May 24, 1988) is an American college basketball coach. He is the head men's basketball coach at the University of the Incarnate Word (UIW), where has overseen a historic turnaround of the Cardinals' program, leading the school to its most successful era at the Division I level.

Since arriving in San Antonio, Heirman has guided UIW from the bottom tier of national metrics to sustained competitiveness, achieving program-first milestones, including conference tournament victories and postseason wins.

== Playing career ==
Heirman played collegiate basketball for the Tulsa Golden Hurricane under head coach Doug Wojcik, the program's all-time winningest coach.

During Heirman's tenure, Tulsa compiled a 91-50 overall record and captured the 2008 College Basketball Invitational (CBI) championship. Heirman was a teammate of future NBA players Jordan Clarkson, Jerome Jordan, and Ben Uzoh.

== Coaching career ==
=== La Lumiere School ===
From 2012 to 2014, Shane Heirman served as the Associate Head Coach at La Lumiere School under head coach Alan Huss. During this period, the program rose from relative obscurity to national prominence, qualifying twice for the National High School Basketball Championship Tournament.

In 2014, Heirman was promoted to head coach following Huss' departure to become an assistant coach at the University of New Mexico. Over the next three seasons, La Lumiere established itself as the nation's premier high school basketball program.

Under Heirman's leadership, the Lakers compiled an 82-7 overall record, set program records for most wins and most points scored in a season, and advanced to back-to-back National Championship games. The program won the 2017 DICK's National Championship, defeating Montverde Academy, 70-52.

In 2017, Heirman was named runner-up for the Naismith High School Coach of the Year.

Heirman became known for an emphasis on player development, recruiting and coaching numerous players who later reached the NBA level, including Jordan Poole, Jaren Jackson Jr., Brian Bowen II, James Banks III, Jeremiah Timon, Isaac Humphries, and Kevin Zhang.

In addition to high school coaching responsibilities, Heirman worked closely with Nike Basketball in the offseason, directing the Skills Academies, Top 100 Camp, international development work with the Chinese Taipei National Basketball Team, and serving as the coach of the Jordan Brand Classic.

=== DePaul University ===
Following a national championship in 2017, Heirman was hired by Dave Leitao at DePaul University, becoming the youngest assistant coach in Big East history at the time of his hiring.

During his tenure with the Blue Demons, Heirman played a key role in recruiting and developing future professional players, including Max Strus (All-Big East selection), Paul Reed (Big East Most Improved Player), Javon Freeman-Liberty (All-Big East selection), Romeo Weems, Nick Ongenda, Charlie Moore, Eli Cain, and Flynn Cameron.

While in Chicago, DePaul reached the championship game of the CBI, marking the program's first postseason appearance since 2007. The Blue Demons also reached their fastest start since 1991 during the 2019-20 season, winning 12 of their first 13 contests. Heirman was instrumental in that success, helping guide DePaul to six Quad 1 victories, an achievement matched by only 23 teams nationally.

Across his final two seasons in Chicago, DePaul signed consecutive top-45 recruiting classes nationally. Those two classes remain the highest-rated recruiting classes in modern ranking history.

=== Central Michigan University ===
Following a successful tenure at DePaul University, Heirman was hired by Tony Barbee to serve as Associate Head Coach at Central Michigan University.

During his time in Mount Pleasant, Heirman recruited and developed future professional basketball players Cam Healy, Brian Taylor, and Harrison Henderson. He also recruited Kevin "Boopie" Miller, who earned MAC Conference Freshman of the Year honors, before going on to become an All-ACC guard at Southern Methodist University.

Heirman helped Central Michigan sign a top-75 recruiting class nationally in 2022, according to 247Sports, the highest-ranked recruiting class in program history.

During his time, the Chippewas improved their win total each season, and Tony Barbee was ultimately named MAC Head Coach of the Year.

=== University of the Incarnate Word ===
Heirman was hired as the eighth head men’s basketball coach in program history in May 2023.

At the time of his hiring, he was among the youngest Division I head coaches in the country. Under his leadership, UIW has experienced turnarounds in Division I men’s basketball, going from 8 wins in his first season to 19 wins in his second, a large year-to-year improvement for them.

During the 2024-25 season, the Cardinals recorded the most wins in the program’s Division I history, the most home wins, and the highest conference win total since the 2015–16 season. The Cardinals also achieved the best start to a season in the Division 1 era and posted multiple victories over top-150 opponents in the KenPom rankings.

That season, Incarnate Word earned its first conference tournament win, and advanced to the College Basketball Invitational (CBI), marking only the program's second postseason appearance. The Cardinals recorded the first postseason wins in program history, defeating the Manhattan Jaspers and Jacksonville Dolphins, before falling in the semi-finals to the Illinois State Redbirds. The Cardinals were the only team in the nation to have three players average at least 15 points per game. Both graduating seniors, Jalin Anderson and Dylan Hayman, went on to become professional basketball players.

During the 2025-26 season, Incarnate Word already reached its highest KenPom ranking in program history, climbing to 152 nationally. The Cardinals also secured their first top-50 win in program history with a victory over McNeese State, snapping the Cowboys' 11-game conference winning streak.

== Head coaching record ==
Record table
Season	Team	Overall	Conference	Standing	Postseason
Incarnate Word Cardinals (Southland Conference) (2023–present)
2023–24	Incarnate Word	8–23	3–15	10th	
2024–25	Incarnate Word	19–17	9–11	T–7th	CBI Semifinals
2025–26	Incarnate Word	12–19	7–15	T–9th	
Incarnate Word:		39–59 (.398)	15–29 (.341)		
Total:		39–59 (.398)			
National champion Postseason invitational champion Conference regular season champion Conference regular season and conference tournament champion Division regular season champion Division regular season and conference tournament champion Conference tournament champion
