= Kovalchick Convention and Athletic Complex =

Convention and athletic center at Indiana University of Pennsylvania

Coordinates: 40.61217°N 79.15986°W

- Artist rendition of the complex
- Interactive map of Kovalchick Convention and Athletic Complex
- Location: 711 Pratt Drive, Indiana, Pennsylvania
- Owner: Indiana University of Pennsylvania
- Operator: Oak View Group Facilities
- Capacity: appx. 5,000 (basketball) appx. 6,000 (end-stage concert)
- Field size: 150,000 square feet (14,000 m^{2})

Construction
- Groundbreaking: November 13, 2008
- Built: November 2008 - January 2011
- Opened: March 4, 2011
- Cost: appx. $54 million
- Project manager: Pennsylvania Department of General Services
- General contractor: Mascara Construction Co. LP
- Main contractors: S.P. McCarl Inc., Farfield Co.

Tenant
- IUP Crimson Hawks

Kovalchick Convention and Athletic Complex is a sports and entertainment complex owned by the Indiana University of Pennsylvania in Indiana, Pennsylvania. The complex, which contains multi-use space for conferences and events as well as arena which will serve as the university's primary indoor venue totals 150,000-square-foot (14,000 m^{2}), and stands on approximately 6.55 acres (26,500 m^{2}) of former salvage land adjacent to the university campus donated by the Kovalchick Salvage Company. The complex is named in honor of the Kovalchick Family, of Indiana, PA, who donated $2 million for the facility's construction.

== Facilities ==
The Kovalchick Convention and Athletic Complex, located along Wayne Avenue adjacent to the Indiana University of Pennsylvania campus, is a 148,500 square-foot facility that offers multi-use adaptable space in the 5,000-seat Ed Fry Arena, the 650-seat Christine Toretti Auditorium, the 17,000 square-foot state of the art Conference Center with multiple breakout rooms, and the 6,000 square-foot Corporate Training and Executive Conference Center. Included in the Conference Center is a fully equipped E-Conference Room with videoconferencing as well as teleconferencing capability.

An ideal venue for concerts, family shows, sporting events, conferences, conventions, trade shows, corporate seminars and much more, the Kovalchick Complex is projected to have a $22 million economic impact on the region during construction and an annual economic impact of $12.5 million in each year of operation. The arena portion of the Kovalchick Complex is named after Fry in honor of Hurley's gift. The Ed Fry Arena is home to the IUP men's and women's basketball teams and the IUP women's volleyball team, a wide variety of concerts, family shows, trade shows, and much more.

== Opening ==
Groundbreaking ceremonies for the Kovalchick Complex took place November 13, 2008, and included an announcement of a challenge grant for $1 million for the facility from Indiana University of Pennsylvania graduate Chad Hurley, co-founder of YouTube, in honor of Indiana University of Pennsylvania music professor and track and field coach Ed Fry.

Early events scheduled after the opening of the arena included the Harlem Globetrotters and the Ringling Bros. and Barnum & Bailey Circus. Ticket sales for the March 10, 2011 show by the Globetrotters set the group's record for most sales in a week for a venue with a capacity of 5,000 or less. In addition to the Globetrotters and Circus, performances in the first months of operation included Waka Flocka Flame, Thirty Seconds to Mars with Anberlin, Widespread Panic, Steve Miller Band with Gregg Allman, Kenny Rogers, WWE Wrestling, Stone Temple Pilots, and comedians Rob Riggle and Steve Byrne.
