= IUP Crimson Hawks =

Athletic teams that represent Indiana University of Pennsylvania

- University: Indiana University of Pennsylvania
- Nickname: Crimson Hawks
- NCAA: Division II
- Conference: Pennsylvania State Athletic Conference (PSAC)
- Athletic director: Todd Garzarelli
- Location: Indiana, Pennsylvania
- Varsity teams: 19
- Football stadium: George P. Miller Stadium
- Basketball arena: Kovalchick Convention and Athletic Complex
- Baseball stadium: Owen Dougherty Field
- Soccer stadium: South Campus Soccer Field
- Other venues: Podbielski Field (softball); S&T Bank Arena; Kovalchick Convention and Athletic Complex
- Colors: Crimson and gray
- Mascot: Norm
- Fight song: Crimson Express; Hail IUP
- Website: iupathletics.com

The Indiana University of Pennsylvania Crimson Hawks, commonly known as the IUP Crimson Hawks and formerly called the IUP Indians, are the varsity athletic teams that represent Indiana University of Pennsylvania, which is located in Indiana, Pennsylvania. The university and all of its intercollegiate sports teams compete in the Pennsylvania State Athletic Conference (PSAC) within the NCAA Division II. The university sponsors 19 different teams, including eight teams for men and eleven teams for women: baseball, men's and women's basketball, men's and women's cross country, women's field hockey, football, men's golf, women's lacrosse, women's soccer, softball, men's and women's swimming, women's tennis, men's and women's indoor and outdoor track and field, and women's volleyball.

== Mascot ==
IUP originally dubbed its sports teams the "Indians," in reference to the town and school's name, and used a costumed student as a mascot. Following movements to eliminate Native American-related mascots, the university eliminated the Indian mascot in 1991, replacing it with an American black bear named Cherokee - deriving from the name of the university's fight song, though it retained the Indian nickname.

In the early 2000s, the university actively moved to change the nickname as well. A campus poll in 2002 indicated the students favored the "Fighting Squirrels" as a nickname. In May 2006, the NCAA ruled that IUP would be prohibited from hosting postseason championship games and using the Indian nickname in postseason events, a year after the university was placed on a list of 18 schools whose mascots were non-compliant with NCAA policies. Suggestions following the NCAA ruling included hellbenders, "Ridge runners," and mining-related nicknames, all relevant to the university's location in Western Pennsylvania.

In December 2006, the Council of Trustees adopted the "Crimson Hawk." The mascot was introduced during the 2007 season-opening football game against Cheyney. In 2008, the hawk was named "Norm," in reference to the university's former name as the Indiana Normal School.

With the change of the mascot, it was for the best that IUP would change its fight song, "Cherokee," as well since it makes references to a Native American tribe. In 2007, Dr. David Martynuik, director of the marching band, composed "Crimson Xpress," the new fight song that would replace "Cherokee" and would bring in a whole new era to IUP athletics.

When a local sportswriter researched what a "Crimson Hawk" was, it was discovered that the domain name crimsonhawk.com was the site of an adult cartoon character named "Crimson Hawk." Some criticized the university's lack of research prior to making the decision. The site owner moved his content to a different domain name without the university asking or the issue being brought to court. Today, IUP remains the IUP Crimson Hawks in all of their sports and club competitions.

== Facilities ==
University athletic facilities are roughly divided into two sections. On campus near the Eberly College of Business is Frank Cignetti Field at George P. Miller Stadium, a 6,500-seat artificial turf stadium that serves as the venue for football, field hockey, and track & field. Adjacent to Miller Stadium is the Memorial Field House, which used to be the host to men's and women's basketball, and women's volleyball, and additionally houses athletic department offices. Also inside the Field House is the Pidgeon Natatorium, which is used by the men's and women's swimming team. The South Campus Athletic Complex holds other sports venues: Owen Dougherty Field, home of the baseball team, Podbielski Field for the softball team, a soccer field and a rugby pitch.

Beginning in 1999, a construction project for a university convocation center was authorized by Pennsylvania Governor Tom Ridge. Construction began near Miller Stadium in late 2008 for the 150,000-square-foot (14,000 m^{2}) complex that will hold a 6,000-seat arena. The Kovalchick Convention and Athletic Complex, which opened in the fall of 2011, is the current home of the men's and women's basketball teams and women's volleyball, replacing the Memorial Field House as these teams primary venues.

== Men's sports ==
=== Baseball ===
- Conference championships: 1960, 1973, 1980, 1988, 1990.
- NCAA Tournament appearances: 1988, 1990.
- NAIA District 18 Champions: 1971, 1977.
- NAIA District 30 Champions: 1960, 1964.
- NAIA Area 8 Champions: 1960, 1971.
- NAIA Baseball World Series appearances: 1960, 1971 (third place).

=== Basketball ===
Through 2010, the men's basketball team has made nine appearances in the NCAA tournament. In the first in 1994 the team advanced to the Elite Eight, after winning their regional competition. In total, the team has advanced to the Elite Eight five times, the Final Four three times, and their first national championship game in 2010, where they were defeated by the Cal Poly Pomona Broncos. In 2010, Joe Lombardi was named the Basketball Times Division II Coach of the Year, following the team's finish as national runner-up. In the 2017–18 season, the team went to the PSAC Quarter Finals.

- Conference championships: 1974, 1995, 2000, 2002, 2004, 2010, 2011, 2013.
- NCAA playoff appearances: 1994 (Elite Eight), 1995 (Final Four), 1996, 2000 (Elite Eight), 2002 (Final Four), 2004, 2005, 2009, 2010 (National runner-up), 2011 (Atlantic Region final/Sweet Sixteen), 2012, 2013 (Atlantic Region final/Sweet Sixteen), 2015 (National runner-up), 2017

=== Football ===
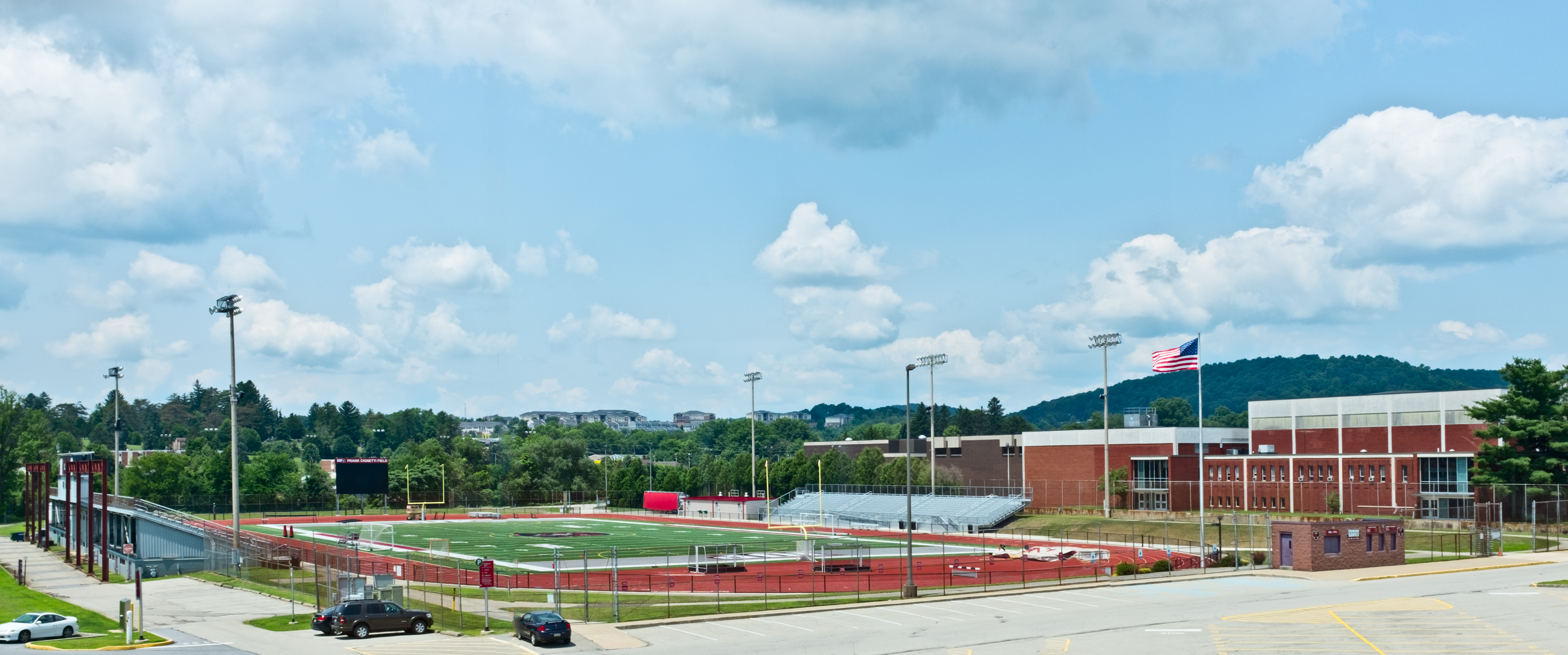
Miller Stadium, IUP's football venue

The university's football program dates back to the 1890s when the team competed against regional athletic clubs and other universities. In the early years, the team featured John Brallier, who would become the first paid football player. Official records by the university begin with the tenure of George Miller in 1927. The Pennsylvania State Athletic Conference was formed in 1951 by the members of the Pennsylvania state university system, and the university has been a member since then, winning 17 West Division titles through 2010.

In 1968 the team competed and lost to heavily favored Delaware in the Boardwalk Bowl. Under Frank Cignetti Sr., the Crimson Hawks regularly appeared in NCAA post-season competition, including two appearances in the NCAA Division II National Football Championship in 1990 and 1993. In 2012, under Curt Cignetti, the Crimson Hawks earned the PSAC title and another appearance in the NCAA Division II National Football Championship. They ultimately lost to the top seed in Super Region One, Winston-Salem State University. In 2017, under first-year head coach Paul Tortorella, the Crimson Hawks finished regular season with a perfect 11–0 record winning the PSAC Championship and earning an appearance in the NCAA Division II National Football Championship.

=== Golf ===
- Conference championships: 1957, 1964, 1973, 1975, 1976, 1978, 1979, 1981, 1983, 1984, 1986, 1989, 1990, 1991, 1992, 1997, 1998, 2000, 2001, 2004 (spring), 2007, 2008, 2009, 2010, 2011, 2012, 2016, 2017, 2019, 2020, 2021, 2022
- Team national championship:
  - 1968 (NAIA)
- Individual national champions:
  - 1968 – Rick Hrip (NAIA)
  - 2009 – Gavin Smith

== Women's sports ==
=== Women's basketball ===
The IUP Women's basketball team won the Atlantic Regional Championships Elite Eight Division II in March 2018. The team has also gone to the PSAC Semifinals and Division II Final Four Semifinals in 2018 and 2019. Their coach, Tom McConnell has led them to many victories over the past few years.

- Conference championships: 1988, 2007, 2008, 2009, 2017
- NCAA playoff appearances: 1988, 1998 (Elite Eight), 2000, 2007, 2008, 2009, 2012, 2013, 2015, 2016, 2017, 2018 Final Four and 2019 Final Four

=== Field hockey ===
- Conference championships: 2007.
- NCAA tournament appearances: 2000, 2004, 2005, 2006 (National semifinals), 2007 (National semifinals), 2008.

=== Soccer ===
- Conference championships: 1995, 2004.
- Division championships: 2005, 2006.
- NCAA playoff appearances: 2004, 2006, 2009.

=== Softball ===
The women's softball team began play in 1979. Beginning in 2009, they compete in the Central Division of the PSAC. They have made appearances in the NCAA tournament in 1999, 2000, 2001, 2002, 2003, 2005, and 2010.

=== Volleyball ===
- Conference championships: 2002.

=== Lacrosse ===
The women's lacrosse program began play in 1999, and achieved their first winning season in 2001 with an 8–7 record.

=== Tennis ===
In the 2010–2011 season, the women's tennis team defeated Slippery Rock placing 2nd in their division just behind California University of Pennsylvania. The team lost in the first round to Armstrong Atlantic 5–0. The women also had the most wins ever in a season (21–8).

- Conference championships: 2017
- NCAA playoff appearances: 2002, 2004, 2010, 2011, 2012, 2013, 2014, 2015, 2016, 2017
- NCAA Sweet 16 appearances: 2011, 2012, 2013, 2014, 2015, 2016, 2017

== Co-ed sports ==
=== Cross country ===
- Men's conference championships: 1972, 1977, 1978, 1982, 1983, 1996.
- Women's conference championships: 1980, 1983, 1984, 1985, 1967, 1987, 1990.
- Women's individual championships: 1986, 1987, 1991, 1991, 2001, 2002, 2003.

=== Swimming ===
- Women's conference championships: 1999.

=== Track & field ===
The PSAC offers both indoor winter and outdoor spring track & field seasons.

- Women's conference championships: 1988
- Individual national champions
  - 2011 – Nafee Harris, long jump (indoor)
  - 2010 – Nafee Harris, long jump (outdoor)
  - 2010 – Nafee Harris, long jump (indoor)
  - 2009 – Nafee Harris, long jump (outdoor)
  - 2008 – Sean Strauman, 800 metres
  - 2002 – Mark Bridge, javelin
  - 2001 – Amber Plowden, 100 meters
  - 2001 – Derek Brinkley, 400 meter hurdles
  - 1993 – Bob Vranich, javelin
  - 1992 – Alan Pugh, discus
  - 1990 – Bob Babiak, decathlon
  - 1990 – Jeffrey Neral, javelin
  - 1987 – Dave Maudie, javelin
  - 1986 – Tammy Donnelly, 10,000 meters
  - 1973 – John Elliot, javelin (NAIA)

== Club sports ==
The university offers many club sports that compete intercollegiately but are not sponsored by the athletic department include:

- Sailing - Member of Middle Atlantic Intercollegiate Sailing Association
- Ultimate Frisbee- Men's and Women's
- Cycling – Eastern Collegiate Cycling Conference
- Men's ice hockey – College Hockey Mid-America, ACHA Division I; Tri-State Collegiate Hockey League, ACHA Division II.
  - The men's ice hockey team competes at the Division I level of the American Collegiate Hockey Association (ACHA) in the College Hockey Mid-America, ACHA Division and plays at the S&T Bank Arena. In the 2018–19 season, won the CHMA season championship. In the 2019–20 season, the team won the CHMA playoffs and awarded a bid to the ACHA National Tournament as the 19th seed, but the tournament was canceled due to the COVID-19 pandemic.
  - Between 1998 and 2005, the top men's team (then at the Division II level) won the championship of the University Hockey League three times, and was runner-up four times.
- Women's ice hockey – Delaware Valley Collegiate Hockey Conference, ACHA Division II
  - The women's ice hockey team won the DVCHC in 2005.
- Men's lacrosse – Keystone Division, National College Lacrosse League
- Men's volleyball – Penn-Ohio Volleyball League
  - The men's volleyball team won the POVL in 2009 and 2010.
- Men's rugby
  - The men's rugby team 2022 D2 7s National Champions, 2022 15s National Finalists. Finished 4th in 2013. Finished 3rd in the Division I national championship in 2000, behind California-Berkeley and Wyoming Universities. IUP finished ahead of fourth-place Army.

2023 National Champions: In December 2023, IUP secured its first national championship in the 15s format by defeating the University of Memphis in Houston, Texas. This victory followed their earlier triumph in the 7s format against North Carolina State in the spring of 2023 . Indiana University of Pennsylvania

2024 National Champions: The Crimson Hawks successfully defended their Division II national title in December 2024 with a 38-29 victory over the University of Northern Iowa. The match was a thrilling contest, with standout performances from players like Ethan Miller, Cam Taylor, and Dylan Deasy. Grant Euker was named the Division II Finals MVP.

Collegiate Rugby Championship Performance: In April 2024, IUP advanced to the semifinals of the Collegiate Rugby Championship, defeating Coastal Carolina and Montana State in the earlier rounds. Dominic Holmes was a key contributor, scoring multiple tries throughout the tournament .

- Women's rugby
- Men's soccer
- Men's Club Baseball- Member of National Club Baseball Association

The IUP orienteering team won three intercollegiate national championships (1973, 1975, 1976). In 1999, Samantha Zipp of IUP was the women's individual orienteering national champion.

== Notable alumni ==
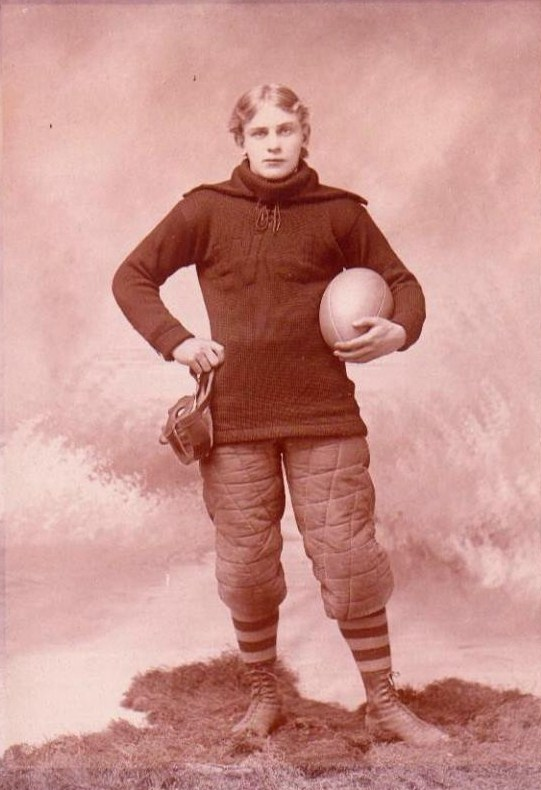
John Brallier played for Indiana Normal School in 1893 and 1894 before becoming the first professional football player.

Notable alumni that have played for IUP teams include:

- Raymond Bernabei, former soccer player and official, National Soccer Hall of Fame
- John Brallier, the first paid professional football player
- Frank Cignetti Jr., NFL and college football assistant coach
- Frank Cignetti Sr., West Virginia and IUP football coach
- Lawson Fiscus, early professional football players
- Kris Griffin, former NFL player
- Mel Hankinson, former college basketball coach
- Jim Haslett, former NFL player and head coach
- Jack Henry, former NFL assistant coach
- Mike Jemison, former NFL and NFL Europe player
- Leander Jordan, former NFL player
- Bob Ligashesky, Pittsburgh Steelers assistant coach
- LeRon McCoy, former NFL player
- Dan Radakovich, Georgia Tech athletic director
- Chris Villarrial, former NFL player
- Ryan Uhl, former MLB player
- Ethan Cooper, former NFL player
- Christian Cochran, Actor and Writer
