= Forest Hills Golf Club =

Public facility in Augusta, United States

Coordinates: 33°28′22″N 82°03′19″W

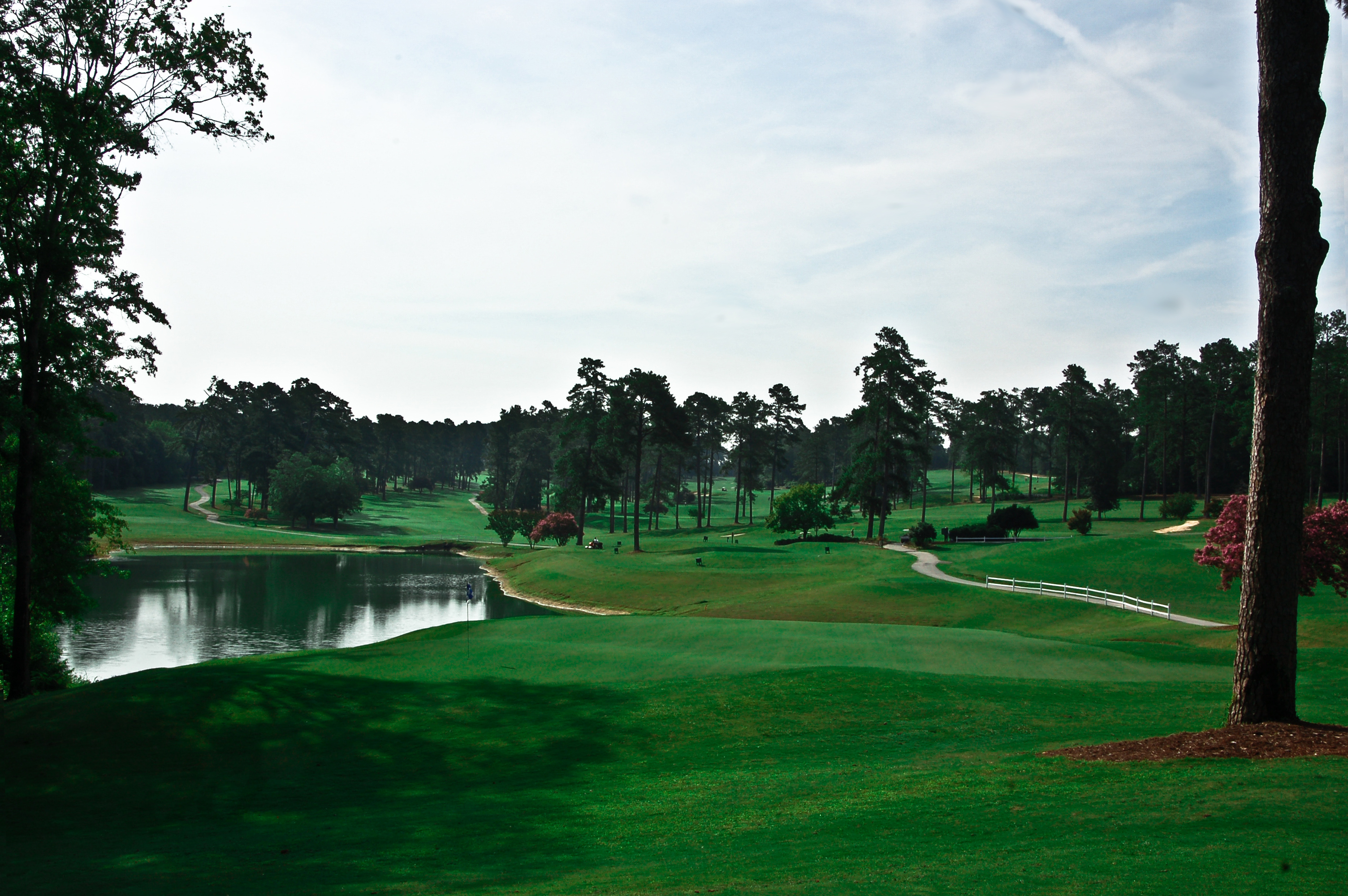
- Interactive map of Forest Hills Golf Club

Club information
- Established: 1926; 100 years ago
- Type: Public
- Owner: Augusta University
- Operator: Augusta University, Augusta Golf Association
- Tota holes: 18
- Tournaments: 3M Augusta Invitational
- Website: theforesthillsgolfcourse.com
- Designed by: Donald Ross (1926); Arnold Palmer Company (2004)
- Par: 72
- Length: 7,057
- Course rating: 74.6
- Slope rating: 141

Forest Hills Golf Club in Augusta, Georgia, United States, is a public facility owned by Augusta University. It features an 18-hole course designed by Donald Ross in 1926, and re-designed by Arnold Palmer Company in 2004. Thirteen of the original holes and the clubhouse survive, though recent renovations have been done to the entryway.

== Notable tournaments ==
1930 Southeastern Open

Bobby Jones began his famous 1930 Grand Slam of golf with a win in the Southeastern Open, which was played with two rounds on the Augusta Country Club and two at Forest Hills. He fired a third-round 69 and final-round 71 to clinch his first tournament of the year by 13 strokes over Horton Jones, and subsequently went on to have a banner year by sweeping the four majors in the same calendar year.

3M Augusta Invitational

Called the Insperity Augusta State Invitational and the Augusta State Invitational in the past, Forest Hills has hosted all but three editions of Augusta University's men's golf tournament since 1979. It has featured players such as Phil Mickelson, Davis Love III, Dustin Johnson, Justin Leonard, and Charles Howell III. It rates as one of the top tournaments in the nation, drawing 13 top-50 teams in 2013 – including then-No. 1 Texas – and eight of the final top 50 in 2012.

AU has won the tournament 13 times, with no other team securing more than the University of North Carolina's three.
