= 2009 NCAA Division II men's basketball tournament =

- Teams: 64
- Finals site: MassMutual Center, Springfield, Massachusetts
- Champions: Findlay Oilers (1st title)
- Runner-up: Cal Poly Pomona Broncos (1st title game)
- Semifinalists: Augusta State Jaguars (2nd Final Four); Central Missouri Mules (3rd Final Four)
- Winning coach: Ron Niekamp (1st title)
- MOP: Josh Bostic (Findlay)
- Attendance: 63,563

The 2009 NCAA Division II men's basketball tournament involved 64 schools playing in a single-elimination tournament to determine the national champion of men's NCAA Division II college basketball as a culmination of the 2008–09 basketball season. It began on March 14, 2008, and concluded as the Findlay Oilers defeated the Cal Poly Pomona Broncos 56–53 in overtime on March 28.

2009 NCAA Division II Men's sites - regionals (cyan) Elite Eight (red)

== Regionals ==
=== Southeast – Augusta, Georgia ===
Location: Christenberry Fieldhouse Host: Augusta State University

First round Round of 64; March 14
1	Augusta State	62
8	Tusculum	60
4	Georgia College	78
5	Barton	80
3	Armstrong Atlantic	67
6	Catawba	74
2	USC Aiken	88
7	Lenoir–Rhyne	70

Regional semifinal Round of 32; March 15
1	Augusta State	77
5	Barton	61
6	Catawba	72
2	USC Aiken	85

Regional final Sweet 16; March 17
1	Augusta State	85
2	USC Aiken	57

=== South – Lakeland, Florida ===
Location: Jenkins Field House Host: Florida Southern College

First round Round of 64; March 14
1	Florida Southern	94
8	LeMoyne-Owen	77
4	Arkansas Tech	63
5	Benedict	62
3	Claflin	54
6	Valdosta State	50
2	Christian Brothers	63
7	Delta State	54

Regional semifinal Round of 32; March 15
1	Florida Southern	95*
4	Arkansas Tech	92
3	Claflin	53
2	Christian Brothers	72

Regional final Sweet 16; March 17
1	Florida Southern	72
2	Christian Brothers	82

=== West – Laie, Hawaii ===
Location: George Q. Cannon Activities Center Host: Brigham Young University-Hawai'i

First round Round of 64; March 13
1	BYU–Hawaii	98
8	Humboldt State	84
4	Cal State Dominguez Hills	87
5	Central Washington	83
3	Cal Poly Pomona	83
6	Cal State San Bernardino	81
2	Western Washington	77
7	Seattle Pacific	82

Regional semifinal Round of 32; March 14
1	BYU–Hawaii	84
4	Cal State Dominguez Hills	71
3	Cal Poly Pomona	80
7	Seattle Pacific	62

Regional final Sweet 16; March 16
1	BYU–Hawaii	58
3	Cal Poly Pomona	59

=== Central – Marshall, Minnesota ===
Location: R/A Facility Host: Southwest Minnesota State University

First round Round of 64; March 14
1	Southwest Minnesota State	69
8	Northern State	47
4	Minnesota State Mankato	81
5	Fort Lewis	67
3	Metro State	59
6	Winona State	60
7	Augustana (SD)	73
2	St. Cloud State	72

Regional semifinal Round of 32; March 15
1	Southwest Minnesota State	77
4	Minnesota State Mankato	69
6	Winona State	82
7	Augustana (SD)	88

Regional final Sweet 16; March 17
1	Southwest Minnesota State	73
7	Augustana (SD)	60

=== Atlantic – Erie, Pennsylvania ===
Location: Hammermill Center Host: Gannon University

First round Round of 64; March 14
1	Gannon	76
8	Pitt Johnstown	53
4	Johnson C. Smith	83
5	Alderson Broaddus	93
3	Kutztown	99
6	West Virginia State	88
7	Indiana (PA)	69
2	Virginia Union	63

Regional semifinal Round of 32; March 15
1	Gannon	67
5	Alderson Broaddus	65
3	Kutztown	92
7	Indiana (PA)	86

Regional final Sweet 16; March 17
1	Gannon	84
3	Kutztown	73

=== South Central – Warrensburg, Missouri ===
Location: CMU Fieldhouse Host: Central Missouri State University

First round Round of 64; March 14
1	Central Missouri	78
8	Texas A&M–Kingsville	55
4	Midwestern State	87
5	Incarnate Word	82
3	Central Oklahoma	75
6	Dallas Baptist	89
7	Angelo State	84
2	Southwest Baptist	89

Regional semifinal Round of 32; March 15
1	Central Missouri	67
4	Midwestern State	65
6	Dallas Baptist	68
2	Southwest Baptist	74

Regional final Sweet 16; March 17
1	Central Missouri	98
2	Southwest Baptist	63

=== East – Brookville, New York ===
Location: Pratt Recreation Center Host: Long Island University, C.W. Post Campus

First round Round of 64; March 14
1	C.W. Post	73
8	Philadelphia Univ.	51
4	Assumption	61
5	Stonehill	49
3	UMass Lowell	84
6	Merrimack	86*
2	Bentley	79
7	Bridgeport	53

Regional semifinal Round of 32; March 15
1	C.W. Post	75
4	Assumption	61
6	Merrimack	76
2	Bentley	79**

Regional final Sweet 16; March 17
1	C.W. Post	82
2	Bentley	76

=== Midwest – Findlay, Ohio ===
Location: Houdeshell Court at Croy Gymnasium Host: University of Findlay

First round Round of 64; March 14
1	Findlay	66
8	Grand Valley State	51
4	Southern Indiana	78
5	Rockhurst	72
3	Northern Kentucky	72
6	Lake Superior State	75**
7	Kentucky Wesleyan	65
2	Bellarmine	76

Regional semifinal Round of 32; March 15
1	Findlay	81
4	Southern Indiana	59
6	Lake Superior State	83
2	Bellarmine	92

Regional final Sweet 16; March 17
1	Findlay	89*
2	Bellarmine	86

== Elite Eight – Springfield, Massachusetts ==
Location: MassMutual Center Hosts: American International College and Naismith Memorial Basketball Hall of Fame

National Quarterfinals; Elite Eight; March 25
SE1	Augusta State	70
S2	Christian Brothers	62
W3	Cal Poly Pomona	79
C1	SW Minnesota St.	74
A1	Gannon	77
SC1	Central Missouri	86
E1	C.W. Post	79
M1	Findlay	89

National semifinals Final Four; March 26
SE1	Augusta State	70
W3	Cal Poly Pomona	74
SC1	Central Missouri	65
M1	Findlay	67

National championship March 28
W3	Cal Poly Pomona	53
M1	Findlay	56*

== Game summaries ==
=== Final Four ===
Cal Poly Pomona beat Augusta State in a Final Four victory 74–70. The Jaguars were down by 11 with about 6 minutes to play, but rallied on a 14–2 run that put them ahead, 68–67. They only scored two points the rest of the game while the Broncos scored seven to win the game. They were led by Larry Gordon, who recorded 20 points and 11 rebounds.

=== National championship game ===
Teams	1st Half	2nd Half	OT	Final
CPP	20	22	11	53
FIND	30	12	14	56

In the Division II National Championship Game, top seeded Findlay Oilers played third-seeded Cal Poly Pomona Broncos. The Broncos, who had traveled 10,000 miles over the postseason, were losing to the undefeated Oilers for much of the game. Cal Poly Pomona managed to tie it at 18–18 before the Oilers went on a 12–2 run to lead by 10 at the half. Findlay widened the lead to 14 with slightly over 16 minutes left. That was the last time the Oilers scored for the next eight minutes while the Broncos recorded 13 straight points to come within one.

Walter Thompson, the point guard for the Broncos, made a three-pointer with 7:08 in regulation to tie the game at 38. They snatched the lead on the next possession at 41–40. Cal Poly Pomona center Tobias Jahn added a point on his two free throws for a 42–42 tie. With 1:42 left in the game, neither team managed to put points on the board. After Thompson missed a rebound on Austin Swift's attempted 3-pointer, the game went into overtime.

Throughout overtime, the lead changed several times. The game was tied at 53 with 24 seconds left on the clock. The Broncos' defense forced a held ball on Findlay with 2.4 seconds remaining, with possession to Findlay. On the inbounds play, Tyler Evans hit a three-pointer at the buzzer—his only three of the game—sealing the Oilers' victory by a score of 56–53.

== All-tournament team ==
- Josh Bostic (Findlay)
- Larry Gordon (Cal Poly-Pomona)
- Morgan Lewis (Findlay)
- Walter Thompson (Cal Poly-Pomona)
- Sanijay Watts (Central Missouri)

== Sources ==
- "2009 NCAA Division II Men's Basketball Championship" (PDF). CBS Sports. 2009. Archived from the original (PDF) on April 7, 2009.
- 2010 NCAA Men's Basketball Championship Tournament Records and Statistics: Division II men's basketball Championship
