= Augusta Jaguars =

Intercollegiate sports teams of Augusta University

- University: Augusta University
- Nickname: Jags
- NCAA: Division I (men's & women's golf); Division II (primary)
- Conference: Peach Belt (primary); WCC (men's & women's golf)
- Athletic director: Melissa Brocato (interim)
- Location: Augusta, Georgia
- Varsity teams: 17 (7 men's, 8 women's, 2 co-ed)
- Basketball arena: Christenberry Fieldhouse
- Baseball stadium: Jaguar Field (Baseball)
- Softball stadium: Jaguar Field (Softball)
- Tennis venue: Newman Tennis Center
- Colors: Augusta Blue, Augusta Grey, and Athletic Blue
- Mascot: Augustus
- Website: augustajags.com
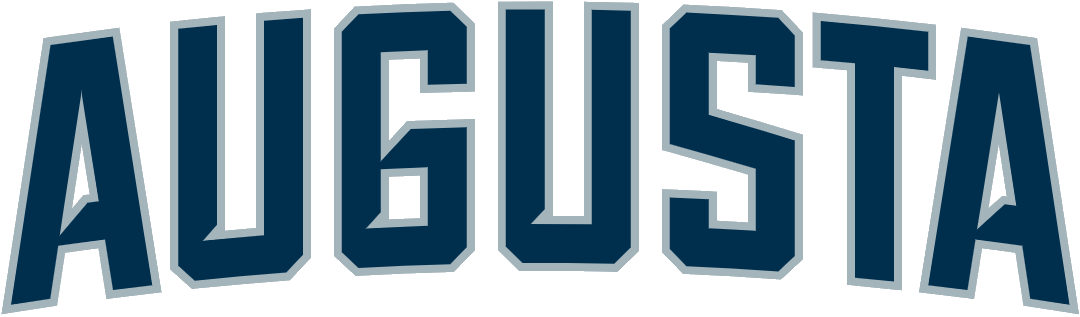

Team NCAA championships
- 2

The Augusta Jaguars (formerly Augusta State Jaguars and Georgia Regents Jaguars) are the athletic teams that represent Augusta University, located in Augusta, Georgia, in intercollegiate sports at the Division II level of the National Collegiate Athletic Association (NCAA), primarily competing in the Peach Belt Conference since the 1991–92 academic year. Augusta's men's and women's golf programs compete at the Division I level as affiliate members of the West Coast Conference.

Augusta competes in seventeen intercollegiate varsity sports. Men's sports include baseball, basketball, cross country, golf, tennis, and track and field; while women's sports include basketball, cross country, golf, softball, tennis, track and field, and volleyball. The Jaguars also sponsor cheer and dance programs.

AU retains the athletics legacy of Augusta State University, which merged with Georgia Health Sciences University (formerly the Medical College of Georgia) in 2013 to form Georgia Regents University. The name became Augusta University in 2015.

AU's colors are a dark blue and gray. They have two main rivals: the USC Aiken Pacers, located 30 minutes away and a PBC division foe, and the Paine College Lions, a city rival; Paine College is located on 15th Street across from the Health Sciences campus of AU.

== Conference affiliations ==
NCAA

- NCAA Division I Independent (1984-1985)
- Big South Conference (1985–1991)
- Peach Belt Conference (1991–present)

== Sports sponsored ==
Men's sports	Women's sports
Baseball	Basketball
Basketball	Cross country
Cross country	Golf
Golf	Softball
Tennis	Tennis
Track and field	Track and field
	Volleyball

=== Baseball ===
The head baseball coach is Chris Howell. All home baseball games in 2019 are scheduled at Jaguar Field on the Forest Hills Campus after playing at Lake Olmstead Stadium for most of their home games from 2009 to 2013 and all of their home games from 2014 to 2018.

Shannon Wilkerson set a high standard for the team, garnering Division II Player of the Year honors in 2009 and getting drafted by the Boston Red Sox as he became the first player to earn back-to-back All-American honors.

=== Men's basketball ===
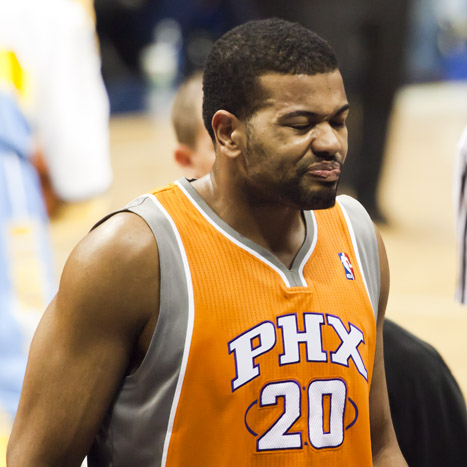
Siler marks the first Jaguar to have broken into the NBA

Men's basketball is one of the most popular sports at the university, and are frequently near the top of the PBC standings and show in the national rankings. The 2008–2010 squads set a high standard of success, going to three consecutive Elite Eights, including a national title game appearance in 2008.

Garret Siler graduated holding the NCAA record for field goal percentage, and played a short stint with the Phoenix Suns afterwards. Ben Madgen went on to a career in the NBL in Australia, where he hailed from.

NCAA Division II title game appearances: Two (2008, 2022)
NCAA Elite Eights: Three (2008, 2009, 2010, 2022)
NCAA Tournament appearances: Eleven, most recently in 2023.

=== Women's basketball ===
The women's basketball team has had runs of success, with a 2004 Elite Eight appearance and final ranking in the top 10. They enjoyed a 20-win season in 2012, clinching the PBC East division crown.

The squad competes in Christenberry Fieldhouse.

=== Men's cross country ===
The men's cross country team was restarted in 2011 and immediately made an impact, winning the conference championship in 2011 and then stepping up further by finishing third in the 2013 Southeast Regional to advance to the NCAA National Championships.

They host the Jaguar Invitational annually in Augusta, Ga.

=== Women's cross country ===
The women's team set a new program best by qualifying for the 2008 NCAA Championships after a second-place finish in the Southeast Regional. They won three events, with another two top-five finishes on the season. They finished second in the 2011 PBC Championships, and are coached by Adam Ward.

=== Men's golf ===
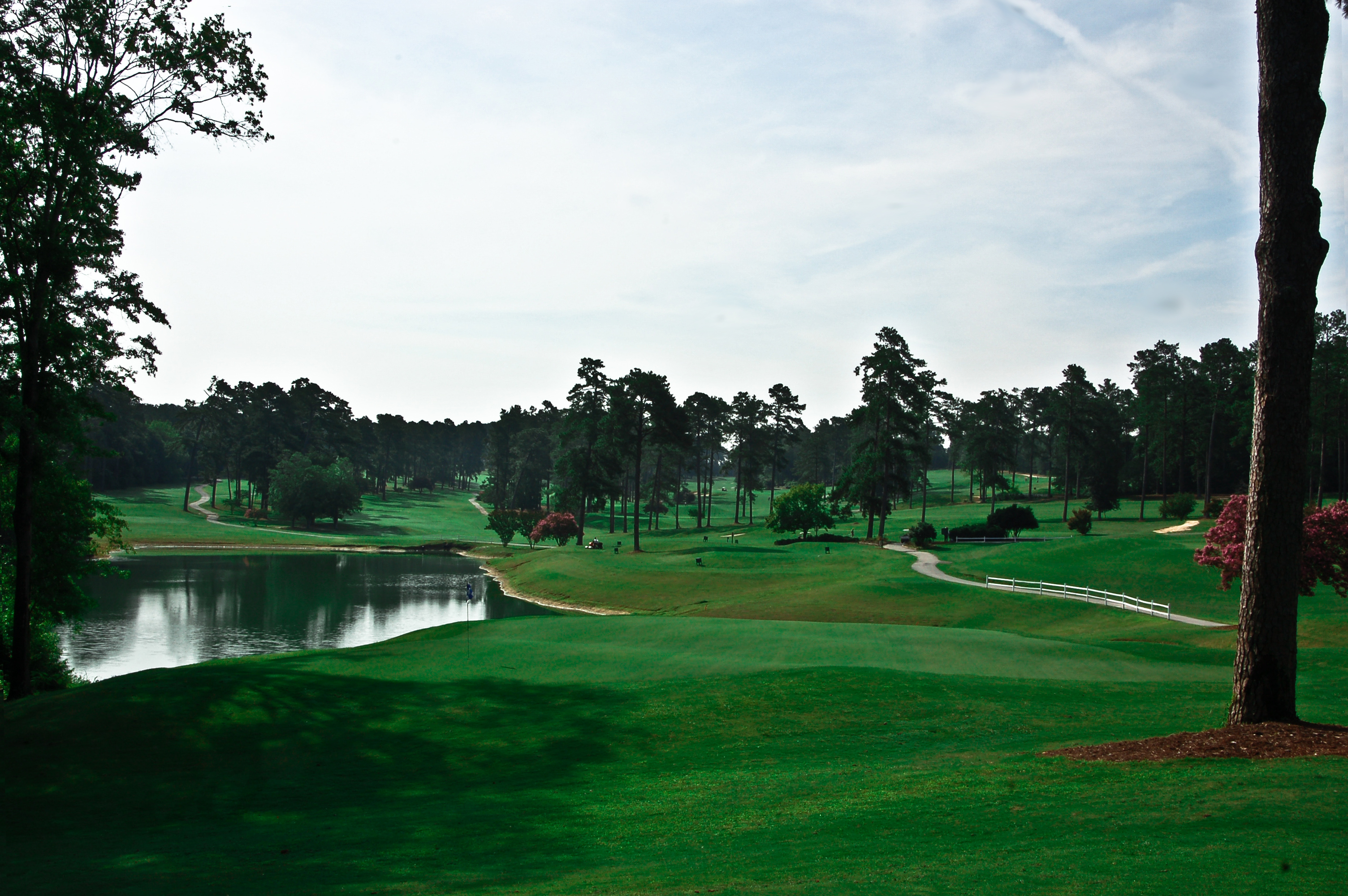
Forest Hills Golf Club is home to both golf teams

The men's golf team has made a name for itself over the years competing at the Division I level, with multiple NCAA Championships appearances. It made history in 2010, winning the National Championship, and repeating as back-to-back champions in 2011. They annually host a collegiate tournament hosted at Forest Hills. From 2014 to 2021, the men's golf team was a member of the Mid-Eastern Athletic Conference (MEAC); it was that league's first-ever associate member in any sport, and also the first school with any level of MEAC membership that was not a historically black institution. After the 2020–21 season, Augusta moved both men's and women's golf to the Southland Conference, remaining there until moving both sports to the West Coast Conference after the 2024–25 season.

Some alumni include Vaughn Taylor, Patrick Reed, Gary Murphy, Scott Jamieson, and Oliver Wilson.

==== 2010 National Championship ====
The team's regular season qualified the team for the postseason with nine consecutive top-five finishes, including three wins under head coach Josh Gregory. After finishing sixth in medal play to qualify for the NCAA's new playoff format, the Jaguars defeated Georgia Tech 3-2 in the opening round, Florida State 4-1 in the semifinals, and host Oklahoma State 3-2 to win their first national title. Patrick Reed, Henrik Norlander, and Mitch Krywulycz all won their matches against the top-seeded Cowboys, with Krywulycz clinching the victory on the first extra hole.

In the NCAA National Championship, the team:

- Patrick Reed; finished T-58 in the medal round, went 3-0 in match play, ended the year ranked No. 9
- Henrik Norlander; finished 5th in the medal round, went 3-0 in match play, ended the year ranked No. 12
- Mitch Krywulycz; finished T-51 in the medal round, went 1-2 in match play, ended the year ranked No. 61
- Taylor Floyd; finished T-72 in the medal round, went 1-2 in match play, ended the year ranked No. 175
- Carter Newman; finished T-146 in the medal round, went 2-1 in match play, ended the year ranked No. 237

==== 2011 National Championship ====
Featuring four future professional players on its roster, the 2011 men's golf squad took down Georgia 3-2 in the final after taking down Georgia Tech 3-2 and then host Oklahoma State 3-2 in the semifinals. The title made the Jags the first team since the 1984–1985 Houston squad to repeat as Division I National Champions.

In the NCAA Championship, the team:

- Patrick Reed; finished T-3, went 3-0 in match play, ended the year ranked No. 4
- Henrik Norlander; finished T-56, went 1-2 in match play, ended the year ranked No. 16
- Carter Newman; finished T-50, went 3-0 in match play, ended the year ranked No. 108
- Mitch Krywulycz; finished T-94, went 2-1 in match play, ended the year ranked No. 121
- Olle Bengtsson; finished 139, went 0-3 in match play, ended the year ranked No. 330

Head coach Josh Gregory, who led both squads, accepted a job with his alma mater SMU after winning the second title.

=== Women's golf ===
The women's program gained steadily competing as a Division I independent on its men's counterpart, competing in back-to-back NCAA Regionals in 2011 and 2012, the team's first back-to-back postseason appearance. The teams hosts an annual tournament at Forest Hills Golf Club that attracts many top-50 teams. AU women's golf joined the Southland Conference alongside the men's team.

=== Softball ===
Augusta softball plays their home games at Jaguar Field, and reached four consecutive NCAA Regionals from 2008–2012 – finishing within one game twice of advancing the Super Regionals in that span. Kacee Camp became the first Jaguar in school history to earn Academic All-American honors in 2012, batting .390 and graduating with a 3.88 GPA in Biology.

=== Men's tennis ===
Competing in Division II with plenty of teams dotting the NCAA Top 25 rankings annually, the men's tennis team has repeatedly qualified for NCAA Tournament play.

In 2012, the team enjoyed its winningest season ever, notching a 19-10 record as they defeated conference foes Lander and Columbus State, then upset No. 17 Drury and No. 9-ranked Grand Valley State in consecutive matches to make their first Final Four appearance. The team finished the year ranked No. 9 and placed Bernardo Fernandes on the All-American squad, both firsts.

The squad is coached by Micahel McGrath.

=== Women's tennis ===
The women's squad has earned nine NCAA Regional berths since 1999, and is coached by Michael McGrath. Their home matches are played at Newman Tennis Center.

In 1992, the women's team won the Peach Belt Conference, under coach Richard Hatfield. Senior Cheri Cathey, juniors Andrea Barnes and Kimberley Kile, and Freshmen Courtley Winter and Aimee Woo were named All-Conference.

=== Volleyball ===
The women's volleyball team hosts their home matches in Christenberry Fieldhouse, and is coached by Sharon Bonaventure. The Jaguars still hold the PBC record for most aces per set, at 3.20 from the 1992 squad. The 2009 edition enjoyed success behind the power of Jessica Howard, who was named a Daktronics Second-Team All-American.

== Professional athletes ==
Name	Sport	Years at AU	Highest level played
Shannon Wilkerson	Baseball	2007–09	MiLB (Note: played for the Portland Sea Dogs.)
Garret Siler	Basketball	2005–09	NBA
Gary Boodnikoff	Basketball	1999–02	NBL
Kavossy Franklin	Basketball	1998–99	NBL – Harbour Heat
Greg Hire	Basketball	2008–10	NBL – Perth Wildcats
Ben Madgen	Basketball	2007–10	NBL – Sydney Kings
A.J. Bowman	Basketball	2005–08	Ola Verde – Mexico
Fred Brathwaithe	Basketball	2009–10	Germany – Leipzig
Richard Johnson	Golf	1991–95	PGA Tour
Henrik Norlander	Golf	2008–11	PGA Tour
Taylor Smith	Golf	1985–86	PGA Tour
Vaughn Taylor	Golf	1996–99	PGA Tour
Patrick Reed	Golf	2010–11	PGA Tour
Jamie Elson	Golf	1999–2001	European Tour
Gary Murphy	Golf	1992–94	European Tour
Scott Jamieson	Golf	2002–05	European Tour
David Park	Golf	1995–96	European Tour
Oliver Wilson	Golf	2000–03	European Tour
Jake Amos	Golf	2008–09	EuroPro Tour
Wallace Booth	Golf	2004–07	Challenge Tour
James Heath	Golf	2003	Challenge Tour
Janne Kaske	Golf	2006–09	Challenge Tour
Major Manning	Golf	2003–06	Web.com Tour
Jay Haas, Jr.	Golf	1999–2003	eGolf Tour
Mitch Krywulvcz	Golf	2007–11	eGolf Tour
Carter Newman	Golf	2007–11	eGolf Tour
