= Christenberry Fieldhouse =

Sports arena in Augusta, Georgia

Coordinates: 33°28′19″N 82°3′34″W

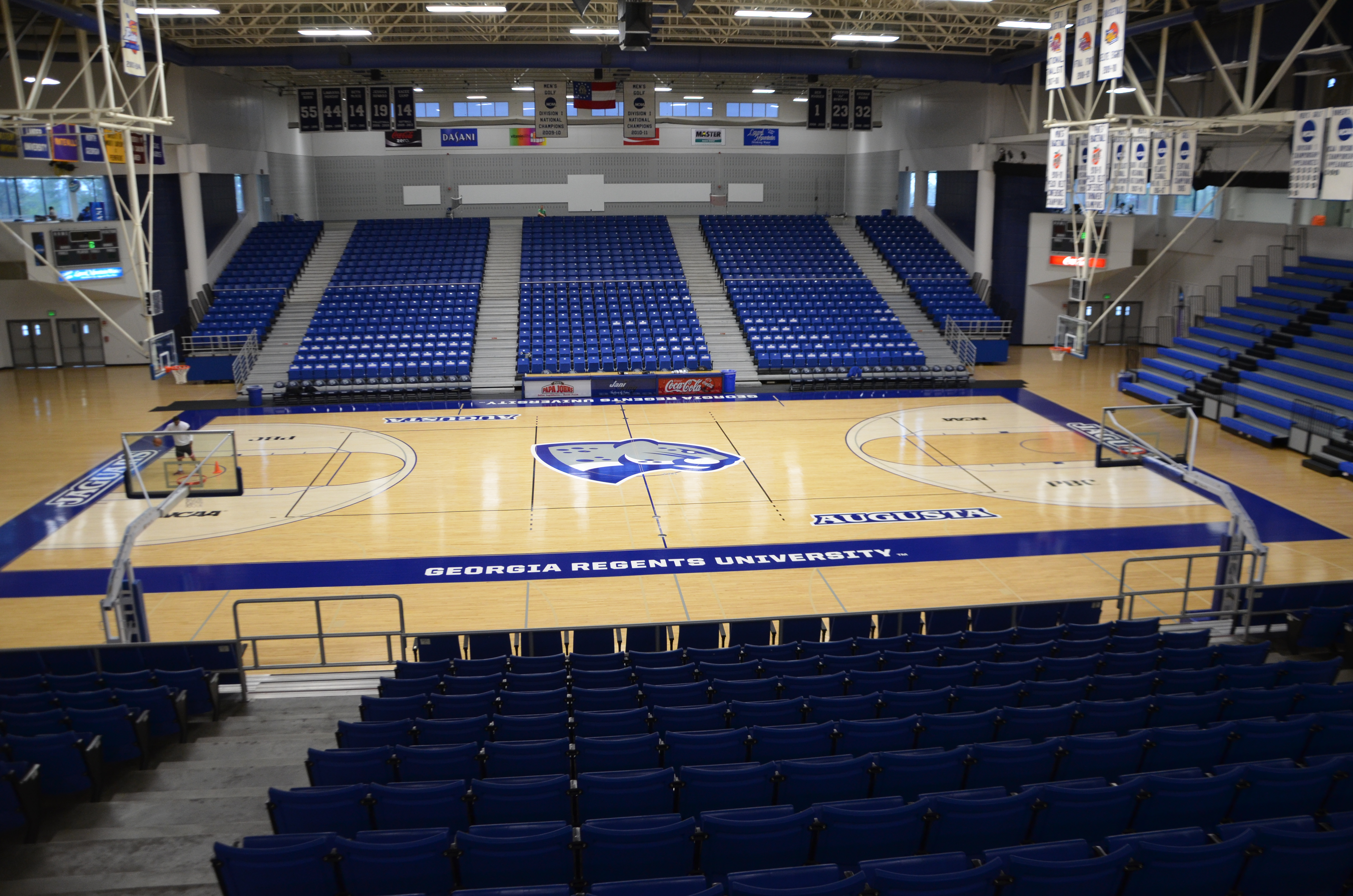
- View of the arena in 2014
- Interactive map of Christenberry Fieldhouse
- Address: 3109 Wrightsboro Road; Augusta, GA; United States
- Owner: Augusta University
- Capacity: 3,207
- Type: Arena
- Surface: Northern Maplewood
- Record attendance: 3,718 (Basketball; Augusta Jaguars vs. USC Aiken Pacers; February 3, 2010)
- Current use: Basketball; Volleyball

Construction
- Opened: 1991; 35 years ago

Tenants
- 'Augusta Jaguars (NCAA) teams: men's and women's basketball volleyball

Website
- augustajags.com/arena

The George A. Christenberry Fieldhouse is a 3,026 seat facility on the campus of Augusta University in Augusta, Georgia, and is home to the athletics department as well as some classes. It is home to the Augusta Jaguars men's and women's basketball teams as well as the women's volleyball team. The first game at Christenberry Fieldhouse was held on February 2, 1991, against the University of South Carolina, a 76–62 loss.

Christenberry Fieldhouse hosted the first four Peach Belt Conference Basketball Championships from 1992 to 1995, and again in 2004 and 2005. In addition, the arena has been the host venue of the NCAA Southeast Region of the NCAA Men's Division II Basketball Championship each year from 2007 through 2011.

Augusta University's men's basketball team, which competed as Augusta State University from 1996 to 2012, amassed a winning streak of 48 consecutive games played at Christenberry Fieldhouse that began on December 15, 2008, with an 80–68 defeat of conference foe Georgia College & State University. The streak ended with a 75–73 loss in the 2011 NCAA Southeast Region Championship to Anderson University on March 15, 2011. Entering the 2012–2013 season, the Jaguars had amassed a home record of 74-4 (94.9 win percentage) from the 2007–2008 season through the 2011–2012 season.

In October 2011, a set of bleachers was added to one end zone of Christenberry Fieldhouse. The new bleachers are the new location of Augusta University's student section, known as "JagSwag". These new bleachers officially hold room for 405 spectators, raising the official capacity of the Fieldhouse from 2,216 to 2,621. A second set of bleachers was added to the opposite end zone during the 2012 offseason, boosting the official seating capacity to its current figure of 3,026. The record attendance of 3,718 was set on February 3, 2010, in a 73–59 win over archrival University of South Carolina Aiken. This figure also marked the highest attendance ever to witness an Augusta State athletic event, and also marked a new Peach Belt Conference attendance record.

In 2023, Augusta University officials announced that Christenberry Fieldhouse would undergo significant renovations. Renovations would include an expanded donor space in the venue, as well as the addition of the Harris Sports Performance Center - a new student athletic sports training center, an improved new sound system, and additional lighting as well as a redesign of the exterior of the building to match University colors/branding.

The Alvin and Yvette Harris Sports Performance Center named for university supporters Alvin and Yvette Harris will be constructed in the upper mezzanine on the south side of Christenberry Fieldhouse. The Harris Sports Performance Center will be equipped with fitness machines, free weights, and other tools for student-athlete strength, performance, training, conditioning, and injury prevention.

The Fieldhouse hosts many events, ranging from the Elite32 Summer Jam to badminton leagues and Tai Chi classes.

Then-President Bill Clinton visited the venue on February 5, 1997. There is a plaque located near the main entrance to the arena honoring his visit.
