= Lonn Reisman =

Director of athletics at Tarleton State University since 1993

Biographical details
- Born: December 23, 1954 (age 71)

Playing career
- 1975–1977: Pittsburg State

Coaching career (HC unless noted)
- 1978–1979: Arkansas State (graduate assistant)
- 1979–1981: Trumann HS
- 1981–1987: Southeastern Oklahoma State (assistant)
- 1987–1988: Connors JC
- 1988–2018: Tarleton State

Administrative career (AD unless noted)
- 1993–2024: Tarleton State

Head coaching record
- Overall: 654–261 (.715)

Lonn Eugene Reisman (born December 23, 1954) is an American politician and former basketball coach and athletic director. He is currently the mayor of Stephenville, Texas. He served as men's basketball coach at Tarleton State University from 1988 to 2018.

== Early life and education ==
Reisman was born in Cuba, New York, the third of five children to Lyle and Josephine Reisman. His father worked as a manufacturing specialist at Acme Electric Corporation. In 1969, the family moved to Lumberton, North Carolina. Reisman attended Lumberton High School where he was a multi-sport athlete, playing basketball under coach Bob Ivey. Shortly before his junior year of high school, Ivey accepted the coaching position at Florida Air Academy. Reisman followed his coach to the school and became a High School All-America in football and basketball. He played basketball and tennis at Coffeyville Community College before transferring to Pittsburg State University. Reisman graduated from Pittsburg State with a bachelor's in physical education in 1977.

== Coaching career ==
After considering a career in medicine, Reisman began his coaching career as a volunteer assistant at Fort Scott Community College. He served as a graduate assistant at Arkansas State during the 1978–79 season before coaching two seasons at Trumann High School. In 1981, he was hired as an assistant at Southeastern Oklahoma State under coach Jack Hedden. Reisman was scouting at Cook County College (now North Central Texas College) when he noticed a young man named Dennis Rodman who he thought had potential. After coming to another game, Reisman found out that Rodman had flunked out of school, so he called his mother after hounding the registrar's office. Despite showing little initial interest, Rodman was convinced to sign at Southeastern Oklahoma State in 1983 after Reisman mentioned a childhood friend of his attended the school. After a star career at the school, Rodman became an NBA Hall of Fame player. Reisman coached at Southeastern Oklahoma State until 1987, when he was offered the head coaching job at Connors Junior College. In his only season, he guided the team to a 21–10 record, with future NBA pick Anthony Jones as its star player.

In 1988, a head coaching position had opened up at Tarleton State, a National Association of Intercollegiate Athletics (NAIA) institution that had one winning season before his arrival. Despite being told by university president Barry B. Thompson, "You don't have the (guts) to take this job," Reisman accepted the position and led the team to an 18–11 record his first season. Reisman claimed three straight Texas Intercollegiate Athletic Association (TIAA) titles, followed by two NAIA regional titles. He credits this initial success to the foundation of the Texan Club, a booster club for the athletic department. He was named assistant athletic director in 1989, and was named athletic director on September 1, 1993, following the resignation of Ron Newsome. In 1994–95, Tarleton State made the move to the NCAA Division II and the Lone Star Conference.

During the 2001–02 season, Reisman guided the Texans to their first 20-win season as a Division II member. The following year, Tarleton state finished 29–4, won the LSC North Division Championship, and advanced to their first-ever Sweet 16. In the 2003–04 season, he won his first LSC Tournament title. He earned TABC Small College Coach of the Year, NABC Regional Coach of the Year, and LSC Coach of the Year honors in 2004. During the 2004–05 season, Reisman guided the Texans to their first Final Four appearance. Between 2010 and 2012 Reisman had two of the greatest defensive teams in NCAA Division II history, holding opponents to 53.3 and 56.3 points per game. His 2013-14 team began the season a school-record 18-0 and finished 28-3 and won the LSC regular season and tournament. In the 2014–15 season, Reisman guided the team to a school-record 31–4 record and he reached his second Final Four after defeating the University of Mount Olive in the Elite Eight.

On January 2, 2016, Reisman won his 600th career victory, a 71–61 win over Cameron, and was presented with a proclamation from Texas governor Greg Abbott. In September 2016, Reisman underwent successful surgery to remove his prostate cancer. On March 23, 2018, Reisman announced he was stepping down as head coach in favor of his son, Chris Reisman. He finished his career with 691 career wins, with 654 of them at Tarleton, the most wins by anyone in Tarleton history. His record at Wisdom Gymnasium was 418–72, and his teams spent 128 weeks ranked in the National Association of Basketball Coaches (NABC) poll.

== Post-coaching career ==
After stepping down from coaching, Reisman continued as the athletic director at Tarleton State. On May 5, 2019, he was inducted as the 169th member of Tarleton State's hall of fame. On May 22, he hired Mike Sirianni as the seventh baseball coach in Tarleton State's modern history. Reisman presided at a ceremony in November 2019 to welcome Tarleton State's entry into NCAA Division I and the Western Athletic Conference starting the 2020–21 season. On March 30, 2020, Reisman hired Billy Gillispie, who formerly coached at Kentucky, as the next basketball coach at Tarleton State.

In June 2024, Reisman was appointed assistant to the president for special projects at Howard Payne University. In 2025, he ran for mayor of Stephenville, Texas against David Baskett. Reisman was elected, receiving 1,265 votes to Baskett’s 643 votes.

== Head coaching record ==
=== Junior college ===
Record table
Season	Team	Overall	Conference	Standing	Postseason
Connors State Cowboys (NJCAA) (1987–1988)
1987–88	Connors State	21–10			
Connors State:		21–10 (.677)			
Total:		21–10 (.677)			
National champion Postseason invitational champion Conference regular season champion Conference regular season and conference tournament champion Division regular season champion Division regular season and conference tournament champion Conference tournament champion

=== College ===
Record table
Season	Team	Overall	Conference	Standing	Postseason
Tarleton State Texans (Texas Intercollegiate Athletic Association) (1988–1993)
1988–89	Tarleton State	18–11	6–2		
1989–90	Tarleton State	26–5	9–1		
1990–91	Tarleton State	26–5	11–1		
1991–92	Tarleton State	26–10	12–0		
1992–93	Tarleton State	22–11	12–0		
Tarleton State Texans (NCAA Division II Independent) (1993–1994)
1993–94	Tarleton State	16–12			
Tarleton State Texans (Lone Star Conference) (1994–2018)
1994–95	Tarleton State	11–15	5–9		
1995–96	Tarleton State	11–16	3–11		
1996–97	Tarleton State	18–10	8–8		
1997–98	Tarleton State	19–8	10–4		
1998–99	Tarleton State	17–12	8–6		
1999–00	Tarleton State	17–9	7–7		
2000–01	Tarleton State	13–13	5–7		
2001–02	Tarleton State	25–8	10–2		NCAA Division II first round
2002–03	Tarleton State	29–4	11–1		NCAA Division II Sweet 16
2003–04	Tarleton State	28–4	11–1		NCAA Division II second round
2004–05	Tarleton State	25–9	9–3		NCAA Division II Final Four
2005–06	Tarleton State	27–7	11–1		NCAA Division II Elite Eight
2006–07	Tarleton State	18–10	7–5		
2007–08	Tarleton State	25–7	9–3		NCAA Division II Sweet 16
2008–09	Tarleton State	18–10	6–6		
2009–10	Tarleton State	24–8	9–3		NCAA Division II second round
2010–11	Tarleton State	24–6	13–1		NCAA Division II first round
2011–12	Tarleton State	27–6	15–3		NCAA Division II second round
2012–13	Tarleton State	20–10	10–8		NCAA Division II first round
2013–14	Tarleton State	28–3	12–2		NCAA Division II second round
2014–15	Tarleton State	31–4	12–2		NCAA Division II Final Four
2015–16	Tarleton State	24–9	9–5		NCAA Division II Elite Eight
2016–17	Tarleton State	22–8	13–5		NCAA Division II first round
2017–18	Tarleton State	19–11	12–6		
Tarleton State:		654–291 (.692)			
Total:		654–291 (.692)			
National champion Postseason invitational champion Conference regular season champion Conference regular season and conference tournament champion Division regular season champion Division regular season and conference tournament champion Conference tournament champion
