= Tarleton State Texans men's basketball statistical leaders =

The Tarleton State Texans men's basketball statistical leaders are individual statistical leaders of the Tarleton State Texans men's basketball program in various categories, including points, assists, blocks, rebounds, and steals. Within those areas, the lists identify single-game, single-season, and career leaders. The Texans represent Tarleton State University in the NCAA's Western Athletic Conference.

Tarleton State began competing in junior college intercollegiate basketball in 1917, and began competing in senior college competition in 1961. However, the school's record book does not generally list records from before the 1950s, as records from before this period are often incomplete and inconsistent. Since scoring was much lower in this era, and teams played much fewer games during a typical season, it is likely that few or no players from this era would appear on these lists anyway.

The NCAA did not officially record assists as a stat until the 1983–84 season, and blocks and steals until the 1985–86 season, but Tarleton State's record books includes players in these stats before these seasons. These lists are updated through the end of the 2023–24 season.

== Scoring ==
Career
Rk	Player	Points	Seasons
1	Chris Givens	2,104	1991–92 1992–93 1993–94 1994–95 1995–96
2	Ross Taylor	1,774	1980–81 1981–82 1982–83 1983–84
3	Marshall Procter	1,726	1959–60 1960–61 1961–62 1962–63
4	Josh Hawley	1,578	2016–17 2017–18 2018–19 2019–20
5	Mark Smith	1,357	1988–89 1989–90 1990–91 1991–92
6	Steve Sassman	1,324	1988–89 1989–90 1990–91 1991–92
7	Jerry King	1,284	1982–83 1983–84 1984–85
8	Dwayne Johnson	1,264	1977–78 1978–79 1979–80 1980–81
9	Freddy Hicks	1,257	2020–21 2021–22 2022–23 2024–25 2025–26
10	Steve Dean	1,186	1967–68 1968–69 1969–70

Season
Rk	Player	Points	Season
1	Roderick Brown	694	1989–90
2	Jeffrey McFadden	669	1988–89
3	Chris Givens	656	1991–92
4	Chris Givens	622	1992–93
5	Sean Walker	603	1992–93
6	Vincent Bridgewater	587	2001–02
7	Tim Burnette	585	2002–03
8	EJ Reed	566	2015–16
9	Corinthian Ramsey	557	2017–18
10	Lawerence Guillory	556	1975–76

Single game
Rk	Player	Points	Season	Opponent
1	Brandon Burney	50	2000–01	Abilene Christian
2	Carl Fields	46	1986–87	University of Dallas
3	Jeffrey McFadden	45	1989–90	Texas College
4	Dior Johnson	42	2025–26	Baylor
5	Carl Fields	41	1986–87	Concordia
6	Corinthian Ramsey	40	2017–18	UC-Colorado Springs
	Chris Givens	40	1993–94	Huron
	Dior Johnson	40	2025–26	Southern Utah
9	Glen Schuelke	39	1982–83	Jarvis Christian
10	De'Andre Upchurch	38	2013–14	Eastern New Mexico
	Barry Knott	38	1994–95	Ambassador

== Rebounds ==
Career
Rk	Player	Rebounds	Seasons
1	Dwayne Johnson	1,045	1977–78 1978–79 1979–80 1980–81
2	Marshall Procter	1,010	1959–60 1960–61 1961–62 1962–63
3	Josh Hawley	968	2016–17 2017–18 2018–19 2019–20
4	Mark Smith	839	1988–89 1989–90 1990–91 1991–92
5	Danny Jones	780	2001–02 2002–03
6	Jerry King	774	1982–83 1983–84 1984–85
7	Collat Johnson	755	1997–98 1998–99 1999–00 2000–01
8	Chris Givens	621	1991–92 1992–93 1993–94 1994–95 1995–96
9	John Davis	599	2005–06 2006–07
10	Freddy Hicks	575	2020–21 2021–22 2022–23 2024–25 2025–26

Season
Rk	Player	Rebounds	Season
1	Dwayne Johnson	417	1979–80
2	Danny Jones	416	2001–02
3	Jeffrey McFadden	413	1988–89
4	Danny Jones	364	2002–03
5	Romond Jenkins	335	2016–17
6	Roy Howard	334	1987–88
7	Jerry King	319	1982–83
8	David Stephens	313	2003–04
9	Lovell Doyle	308	1990–91
10	Bobby Davis	305	1995–96

Single game
Rk	Player	Rebounds	Season	Opponent
1	Jim Locke	25	1971–72	Angelo State
2	Dwayne Johnson	24	1980–81	Jarvis Christian
3	Danny Jones	22	2001–02	A&M-Kingsville
	Roy Howard	22	1986–87	Concordia
5	Collat Johnson	20	2000–01	National Christian
	Collat Johnson	20	2000–01	Houston Baptist
	Collat Johnson	20	1999–00	A&M-Kingsville
8	Danny Jones	19	2002–03	Jarvis Christian
	Danny Jones	19	2001–02	SW Adventist
10	Lawerence Guillroy	18	1976–77	Bishop

== Assists ==
Career
Rk	Player	Assists	Seasons
1	Edward Milton	557	1989–90 1990–91 1991–92 1992–93
2	Ryan Huntley	507	1995–96 1996–97 1997–98 1998–99
3	Mark Smith	458	1988–89 1989–90 1990–91 1991–92
4	Deshawn Riddick	355	2014–15 2015–16 2016–17 2017–18
5	Michael Hardge	345	2012–13 2013–14 2014–15 2015–16
6	Chuck Guy	318	2012–13 2013–14
7	Glen Schuelke	316	1980–81 1981–82 1982–83 1983–84
8	Tracy Guy	309	1988–89 1989–90
9	Marcus Jacobs	291	2001–02 2002–03
10	Chris Reisman	281	1998–99 1999–00 2000–01 2001–02

Season
Rk	Player	Assists	Season
1	Edward Milton	247	1991–92
2	Edward Milton	187	1990–91
3	Chuck Guy	184	2013–14
4	Ryan Huntley	177	1997–98
5	Tracy Guy	169	1988–89
6	Marcus Jacobs	163	2001–02
7	Ryan Huntley	154	1996–97
8	Michael Hardge	149	2015–16
9	LaShon Sheffield	147	2004–05
10	Chris Reisman	146	1999–00

Single game
Rk	Player	Assists	Season	Opponent
1	Chris Brown	18	1994–95	LeTourneau
2	Corinthian Ramsey	16	2017–18	Northern New Mexico
3	Ryan Huntley	15	1997–98	LeTourneau
4	Montre Gipson	14	2020–21	McMurry
	Chuck Guy	14	2013–14	A&M-Kingsville
	Mike Daniels	14	2006–07	A&M-Commerce
7	Dustin Minter	13	1995–96	Hillsdale Baptist
8	Marcus Jacobs	12	2002–03	Dallas Christian
	Chris Reisman	12	1998–99	National Christian
	Ryan Huntley	12	1996–97	Central Oklahoma
	Ryan Huntley	12	1996–97	Abilene Christian

== Steals ==
Career
Rk	Player	Steals	Seasons
1	Ryan Huntley	190	1995–96 1996–97 1997–98 1998–99
2	Josh Hawley	168	2016–17 2017–18 2018–19 2019–20
3	Collat Johnson	167	1997–98 1998–99 1999–00 2000–01
4	Mark Smith	163	1988–89 1989–90 1990–91 1991–92
5	Edward Milton	162	1989–90 1990–91 1991–92 1992–93
6	Shamir Bogues	159	2020–21 2021–22 2022–23
7	Chris Givens	158	1991–92 1992–93 1993–94 1994–95 1995–96
8	Brandon Lee	141	2002–03 2003–04
9	Michael Hardge	121	2012–13 2013–14 2014–15 2015–16
10	Freddie Pierce	119	1982–83 1983–84 1984–85 1985–86

Season
Rk	Player	Steals	Season
1	Brandon Lee	83	2002–03
2	Shamir Bogues	67	2022–23
3	Tim Burnette	65	2002–03
4	Ryan Huntley	63	1997–98
5	LaShon Sheffield	62	2004–05
6	Collat Johnson	59	2000–01
	Emmanuel Innocenti	59	2023–24
	Jakorie Smith	59	2023–24
9	Edward Milton	58	1990–91
	Ryan Huntley	58	1996–97
	Brandon Lee	58	2003–04
	Edward Milton	58	1991–92

Single game
Rk	Player	Steals	Season	Opponent
1	Shamir Bogues	11	2022–23	Southwestern Assemblies of God
2	Chris Brown	10	1994–95	West Texas A&M
3	Ryan Huntley	9	1997–98	LeTourneau
4	Leroy Kelly IV	8	2025–26	Howard Payne
	Izzy Miles	8	2024–25	UCF
	Montre Gipson	8	2020–21	McMurry
	Tahj Small	8	2020–21	Southwestern Adventist
	Brandon Lee	8	2002–03	Southeastern Oklahoma
	Gabe Johnson	8	1998–99	Texas Wesleyan
	Bobby Davis	8	1996–97	Abilene Christian

== Blocks ==
Career
Rk	Player	Blocks	Seasons
1	Mark Smith	226	1988–89 1989–90 1990–91 1991–92
2	Vincent Bridgewater	143	2001–02 2002–03
3	Josh Hawley	138	2016–17 2017–18 2018–19 2019–20
4	Sean Walker	136	1992–93 1993–94 1994–95
5	Clashon Gaffney	122	2017–18 2018–19 2019–20
6	Jon Cathey-Macklin	94	2012–13 2013–14
7	Damion Clemons	92	2011–12 2012–13 2013–14 2014–15
8	Davene Carter	89	2011–12 2012–13 2013–14 2014–15
	Terrence Gamble	89	2006–07 2007–08
10	Romond Jenkins	87	2015–16 2016–17
	Collat Johnson	87	1997–98 1998–99 1999–00 2000–01

Season
Rk	Player	Blocks	Season
1	Vincent Bridgewater	81	2001–02
2	Mark Smith	79	1990–91
3	Roy Howard	77	1987–88
4	Xavier Smith	70	2015–16
5	Mark Smith	69	1989–90
6	Sean Walker	68	1993–94
	Sean Walker	68	1992–93
	Mark Smith	68	1988–89
9	Vincent Bridgewater	62	2002–03
10	Romond Jenkins	60	2016–17

Single game
Rk	Player	Blocks	Season	Opponent
1	Vincent Bridgewater	8	2002–03	Southeastern Oklahoma
	Bobby Davis	8	2005–06	Sul Ross
3	KiAndre Gaddy	7	2023–24	UT Rio Grande Valley
	Josh Hawley	7	2017–18	UT Permian Basin
	Jon Cathey-Macklin	7	2012–13	Incarnate Word
	Vincent Bridgewater	7	2002–03	Central Oklahoma
	Andray Johnson	7	1998–99	Texas College
8	Clashon Gaffney	6	2019–20	Midwestern State
	Romond Jenkins	6	2016–17	Western New Mexico
	Xavier Smith	6	2015–16	Eastern New Mexico
	Terrence Gamble	6	2007–08	Eastern New Mexico
	Vincent Bridgewater	6	2002–03	A&M-Commerce
	Vincent Bridgewater	6	2001–02	West Texas A&M
	Vincent Bridgewater	6	2001–02	A&M-Kingsville
