= Lajae Jones =

American basketball player (born 2004)

No. 25 – Pallacanestro Trieste
- Position: Shooting guard / small forward
- League: LBA

Personal information
- Born: May 21, 2004 (age 22) Neptune Beach, Florida, U.S.
- Listed height: 6 ft 7 in (2.01 m)
- Listed weight: 220 lb (100 kg)

Career information
- High school: Duncan U. Fletcher (Neptune Beach, Florida)
- College: Tarleton State (2022–2023); Barton CC (2023–2024); St. Bonaventure (2024–2025); Florida State (2025–2026)
- NBA draft: 2026: 2nd round, 54th overall pick
- Drafted by: Golden State Warriors
- Playing career: 2026–present

Career history
- 2026–present: Pallacanestro Trieste
- Stats at NBA.com
- Stats at Basketball Reference

Lajae Leo Jones (born May 21, 2004) is an American professional basketball player for Pallacanestro Trieste of the Lega Basket Serie A (LBA). He played college basketball for the Tarleton State Texans, Barton Cougars, St. Bonaventure Bonnies and Florida State Seminoles. Jones was selected by the Golden State Warriors with the 54th overall pick in the second round of the 2026 NBA draft.

== Early life ==
Jones was born on May 21, 2004, to an African American father and an Israeli Jewish mother. At age 13, his family moved to Neptune Beach, Florida. He attended Duncan U. Fletcher High School in Neptune Beach where he was a two-team all-conference selection and was named first-team all-state and the district player of the year as a senior. A two-time team captain, he averaged 20.7 points and 7.4 rebounds per game in his senior year. Jones had 1,426 points, 197 assists and 176 steals at Fletcher. He signed to play college basketball for the Tarleton State Texans.

== College career ==
As a freshman at Tarleton State in 2022–23, Jones appeared in 10 games, averaging 3.6 points and 1.4 rebounds. He transferred to Barton Community College in Kansas for the 2023–24 season, where he helped the team to a record of 36-1 and won the junior college national championship, averaging 15.4 points and 9.2 rebounds per game. Jones transferred again after the season to the St. Bonaventure Bonnies, playing a year there and starting 33 games. For the Bonnies, Jones shot 45.6 percent from the field and posted averages of 10.8 points and 5.8 rebounds. He transferred a third time in 2025, joining the Florida State Seminoles, where he averaged 12.7 points and 5.7 rebounds in his lone season there.

== Professional career ==
On June 24, 2026, Jones was selected by the Golden State Warriors with the 54th overall pick in the 2026 NBA draft. On July 2, he was announced to participate with the team during the 2026 NBA Summer League, along with fellow draftee Yaxel Lendeborg (2026 No. 11 pick). On July 19, 2026, Jones, alongside the Warriors, won the 2026 NBA Summer League Championship against the Memphis Grizzlies, where in 11 minutes, he scored 4 points in a 94–90 win. Following the Summer League conclusion, Jones averaged 8.7 points, 3.3 rebounds, and 0.4 assists in 16.3 minutes. However on September 21, instead of signing with the Warriors, Jones signed with Pallacanestro Trieste of the Italian Lega Basket Serie A.

== International career ==
Jones expressed his will to join the Israeli National Basketball Team.

== Career statistics ==
Legend
GP	Games played	GS	Games started	MPG	Minutes per game
FG%	Field goal percentage	3P%	3-point field goal percentage	FT%	Free throw percentage
RPG	Rebounds per game	APG	Assists per game	SPG	Steals per game
BPG	Blocks per game	PPG	Points per game	**Bold**	Career high

=== College ===
Year	Team	GP	GS	MPG	FG%	3P%	FT%	RPG	APG	SPG	BPG	PPG
2022–23	Tarleton State	10	0	6.1	**.571**	.000	.571	1.4	.3	.4	.4	3.6
2024–25	St. Bonaventure	**34**	**33**	**33.0**	.456	**.389**	**.800**	**5.8**	.6	**1.5**	.8	10.8
2025–26	Florida State	33	31	29.5	.427	.325	.763	5.7	**1.1**	1.2	**1.0**	**12.7**
Career		77	64	28.0	.446	.346	.771	5.2	.8	1.2	.8	10.7
