= Oran, Texas =

Unincorporated community in Texas, US

Coordinates: 32°57′45″N 98°09′35″W

Oran is an unincorporated community in Palo Pinto County, Texas, United States.

Public education in the community is provided by the Graford Independent School District.
