= Álvaro Teherán =

Colombian basketball player (1966–2020)

Personal information
- Born: January 6, 1966 María La Baja, Colombia
- Died: May 4, 2020 (aged 54) Cartagena, Colombia
- Listed height: 7 ft 1 in (2.16 m)
- Listed weight: 235 lb (107 kg)

Career information
- College: Houston Baptist (1987–1989); Houston (1989–1991)
- NBA draft: 1991: 2nd round, 44th overall pick
- Drafted by: Philadelphia 76ers
- Playing career: 1991–2006
- Position: Center

Career history
- 1991–1992: Caja de Ronda
- 1992–1993: Baloncesto Fuenlabrada
- 1993–1994: Fort Wayne Fury
- 1995: Baloncesto Fuenlabrada
- 1995–1996: KK Olimpija
- 1996: Arrieros de Medellín
- 1997: Santos de San Juan
- 1998–2001: Piratas de Bogotá
- 2001–2002: Arrieros de Medellín
- 2006: Arrieros de Medellín

Career highlights
- Second-team All-SWC (1991)
- Stats at Basketball Reference

Álvaro Teherán Teherán (January 6, 1966 – May 4, 2020) was a Colombian basketball player who was selected with the 44th overall pick in the 1991 NBA draft by the Philadelphia 76ers. A 7'1" center, Teherán played college basketball at Houston Baptist from 1987 to 1989 and Houston from 1989 to 1991.

Born in María La Baja, Colombia, Teherán was the son of Romualdo Teherán and Cecilia Teherán (not related). He was noticed playing basketball by Alfonso Torres in 1984, who recommended that he moved to Cartagena, Colombia.

He died on May 4, 2020, having been hospitalized with kidney failure in December 2019.

His son, Jaret Valencia, was a high school basketball prospect at Veritas Prep in Calabasas, California and played college basketball.
