= Willy Workman =

American-Israeli basketball player

Willy Workman וילי וורקמן
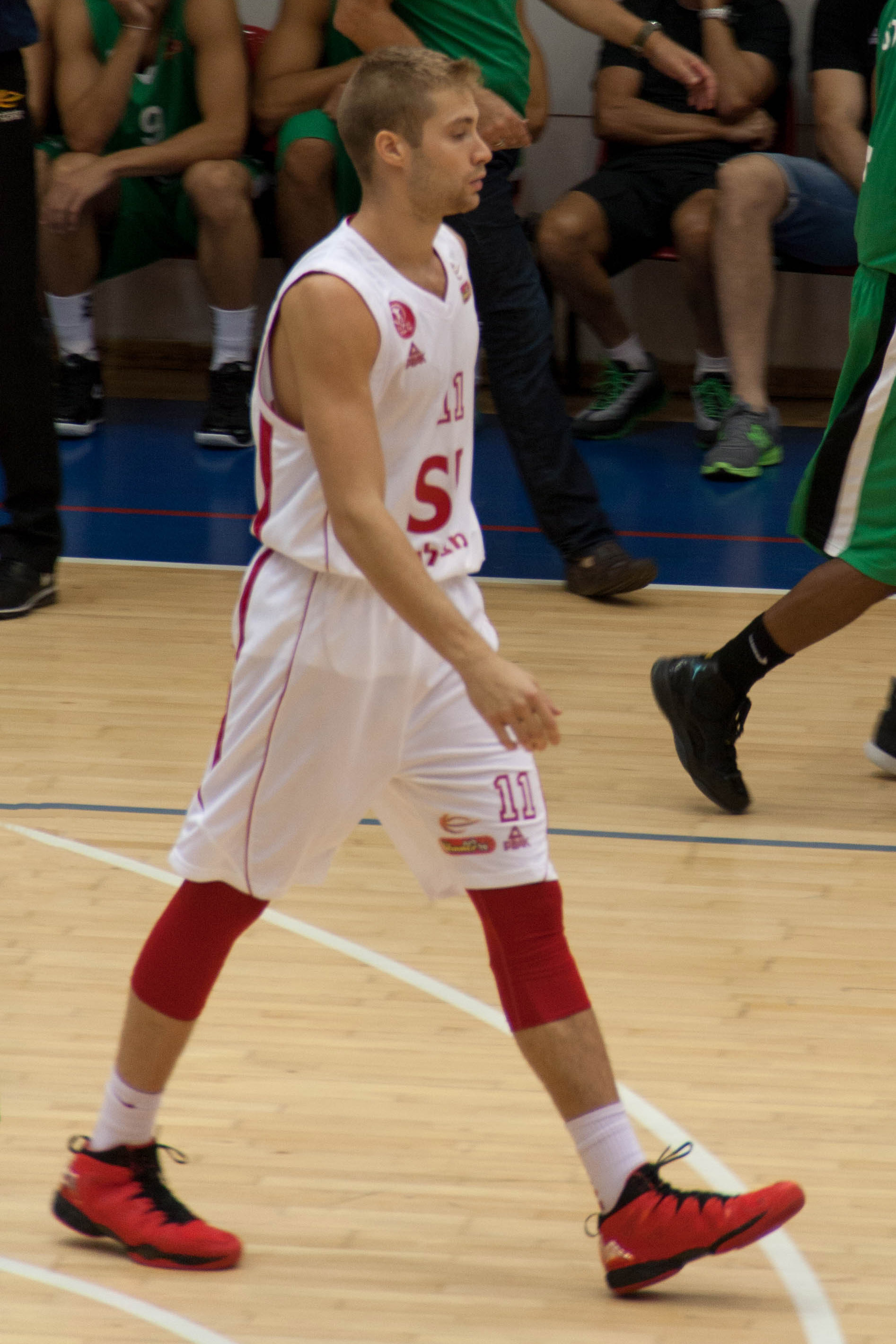
- Workman with Hapoel Tel Aviv in 2014

No. 1 – Maccabi Ra'anana
- Position: Small forward
- League: Liga Leumit

Personal information
- Born: March 14, 1990 (age 36) Northampton, Massachusetts, U.S.
- Listed height: 1.98 m (6 ft 6 in)

Career information
- High school: Northampton High School (Northampton, Massachusetts)
- College: Amherst (2009–2013)
- NBA draft: 2013: undrafted
- Playing career: 2013–present

Career history
- 2013–2014: Hapoel Galil Elyon
- 2014–2015: Hapoel Tel Aviv
- 2015–2016: Maccabi Ashdod
- 2016–2020: Maccabi Haifa
- 2020–2021: Hapoel Holon
- 2021–2022: Hapoel Jerusalem
- 2022–2023: Maccabi Ra'anana
- 2023–2024: Bnei Herzliya
- 2024–2025: Hapoel Haifa
- 2025–present: Maccabi Ra'anana

Career highlights
- Balkan League champion (2021); Israeli National League champion (2019); Israeli Premier League All-Star (2018); NCAA Division III champion (2013); First-team All-ECAC Division III (2013); First-team All-NESCAC (2013)

Willy Workman (Hebrew: וילי וורקמן; born March 14, 1990) is an American-Israeli professional basketball player for Maccabi Ra'anana of the Israeli Liga Leumit. He played college basketball at Amherst. Workman holds dual-American and Israeli citizenship.

== Early life ==
Workman is Jewish and was born to a Jewish mother in Northampton, Massachusetts. He attended Northampton High School before completing a postgraduate year at nearby Deerfield Academy, where he resumed playing basketball after enduring injuries earlier in his high school career. Workman's father, Danny, is a longtime restaurateur. His mother, Dina Fein, is a judge in Springfield, Massachusetts.

== College career ==
Workman attended Amherst College from 2009 to 2013, winning the NCAA3 Championship his senior year. He averaged 10.2 points, 6.1 rebounds and 2.9 assists for his four-year career at Amherst, earning D3hoops.com men's All-America Third Team, ECAC Division III New England First Team and NESCAC First Team honors in 2013.

== Professional career ==
During his first season of professional basketball in 2013–14, Workman played for Hapoel Galil Elyon of the Israeli National League, the second-tier league in Israel, and was able to move to the country's top-flight Premier League, when signing with Hapoel Tel Aviv for the 2014–15 season.

He was signed by fellow Premier League side Maccabi Ashdod for 2015–16 and inked a contract with Maccabi Haifa prior to the 2016–17 Premier League campaign. That season, Workman helped Haifa to reach the 2017 Israeli League Finals, where they eventually lost to Hapoel Jerusalem.

On February 28, 2018, Workman signed a three-year contract extension with Maccabi Haifa. On March 2, 2018, Workman participated in the Israeli League All-Star Game as a replacement for Oz Blayzer. That season, despite Workman having his best year in the Israeli Premier League in terms of personal averages (6.7 points and 5.4 rebounds per game) – his team, Maccabi Haifa, had finished the season in the last place out of 12 teams and was relegated to the Israeli National League (the second-tier league in Israel).

In the 2018–19 season, Workman won the 2019 Israeli National League Championship title with Haifa, earning a promotion back to the Israeli Premier League. In the 2019–20 season, he averaged 8.1 points and 4.9 rebounds per game. On August 5, 2020, Workman signed with Hapoel Holon.

On July 2, 2021, he signed with Hapoel Jerusalem of the Israeli Premier League.

On August 19, 2022, he signed with Maccabi Ra'anana of the Liga Leumit (basketball).

On June 28, 2023, he signed with Bnei Herzliya of the Israeli Premier League on a two-year contract.
