= 1991 NBA draft =

Basketball player selection

General information
- Sport: Basketball
- Date: June 26, 1991
- Location: Felt Forum, Madison Square Garden (New York City, New York)
- Network: TNT

Overview
- 54 total selections in 2 rounds
- League: NBA
- First selection: Larry Johnson (Charlotte Hornets)
- Hall of Famers: 1: C Dikembe Mutombo

The 1991 NBA draft took place on June 26, 1991, in New York City, New York. Larry Johnson was selected first overall; he won the 1992 NBA Rookie of the Year award and as a two-time All-Star, was the first player to represent the Charlotte Hornets franchise at an All-Star game.

Dikembe Mutombo was selected fourth overall, and became one of the greatest defensive centers in the history of the league. He was a four-time NBA Defensive Player of the Year award winner and an eight-time All-Star, and played in the league for 18 seasons.

Other notable picks include Kenny Anderson, Steve Smith, Terrell Brandon, Dale Davis and Chris Gatling, who all made All-Star appearances, but with the exception of Brandon at two, each only appeared once.

The remaining picks in the first round failed to make an impact. Billy Owens was selected by the Sacramento Kings but refused to sign with them. He was traded to the Golden State Warriors in exchange for high-scoring guard Mitch Richmond. Owens was solid but unspectacular in his career, while Richmond was a six-time All-Star and was the 1989 NBA Rookie of the Year. Luc Longley was a three-time NBA Championship winner with the Chicago Bulls and held the record for playing the most NBA games by an Australian (broken by Andrew Bogut during the 2015–16 season).

As of 2024, three players are deceased: Bobby Phills, Bison Dele, and Dikembe Mutombo. Phills died in a car accident involving teammate David Wesley. Dele disappeared in the South Pacific in July 2002, with French authorities claiming that Dele's brother had killed Dele and his girlfriend and thrown them overboard the catamaran they were travelling on. Dele's brother committed suicide in September 2002. Mutombo died from brain cancer on September 30, 2024.

This was the last draft held in New York City until 2001.

== Draft ==
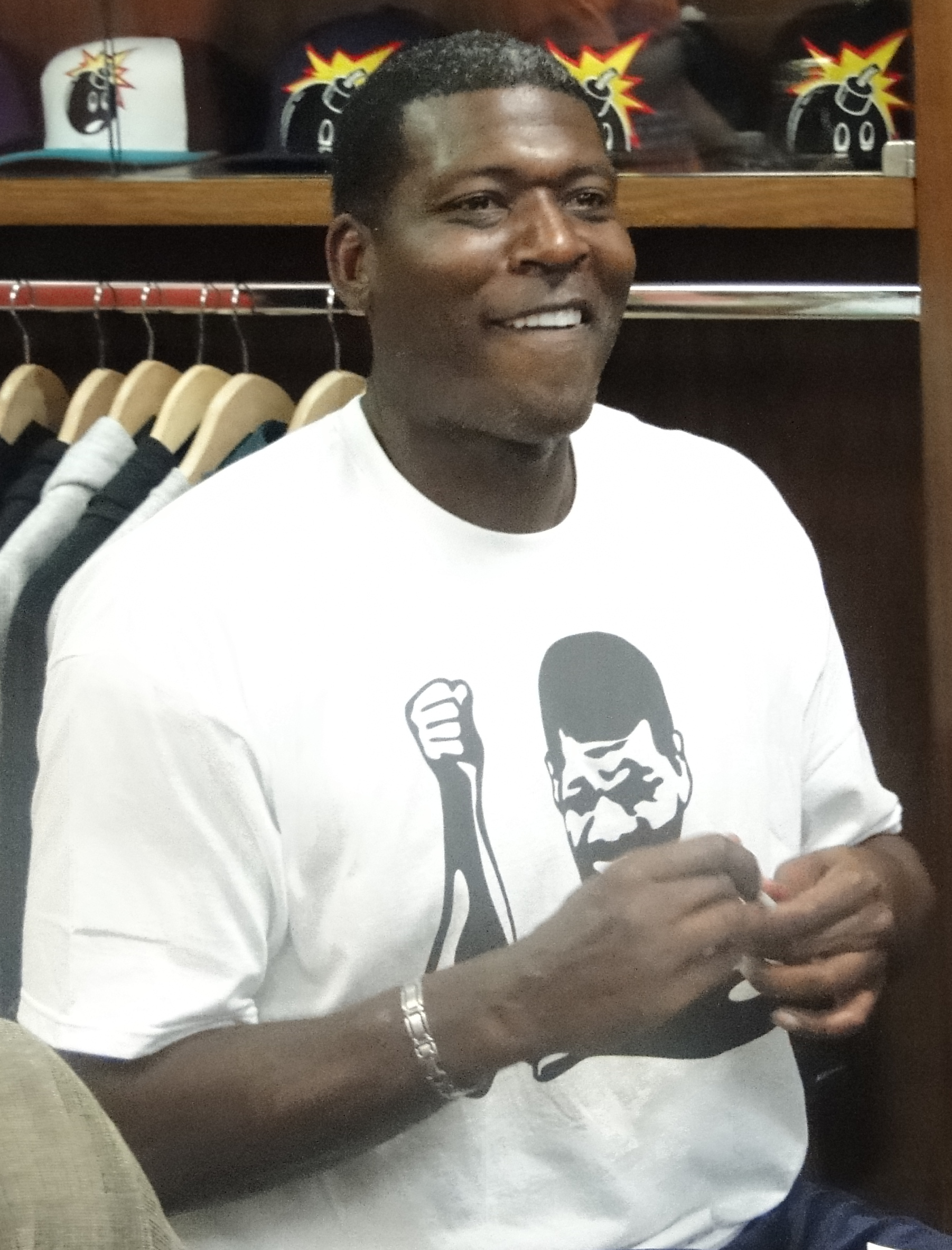
Larry Johnson was selected 1st overall by the Charlotte Hornets.

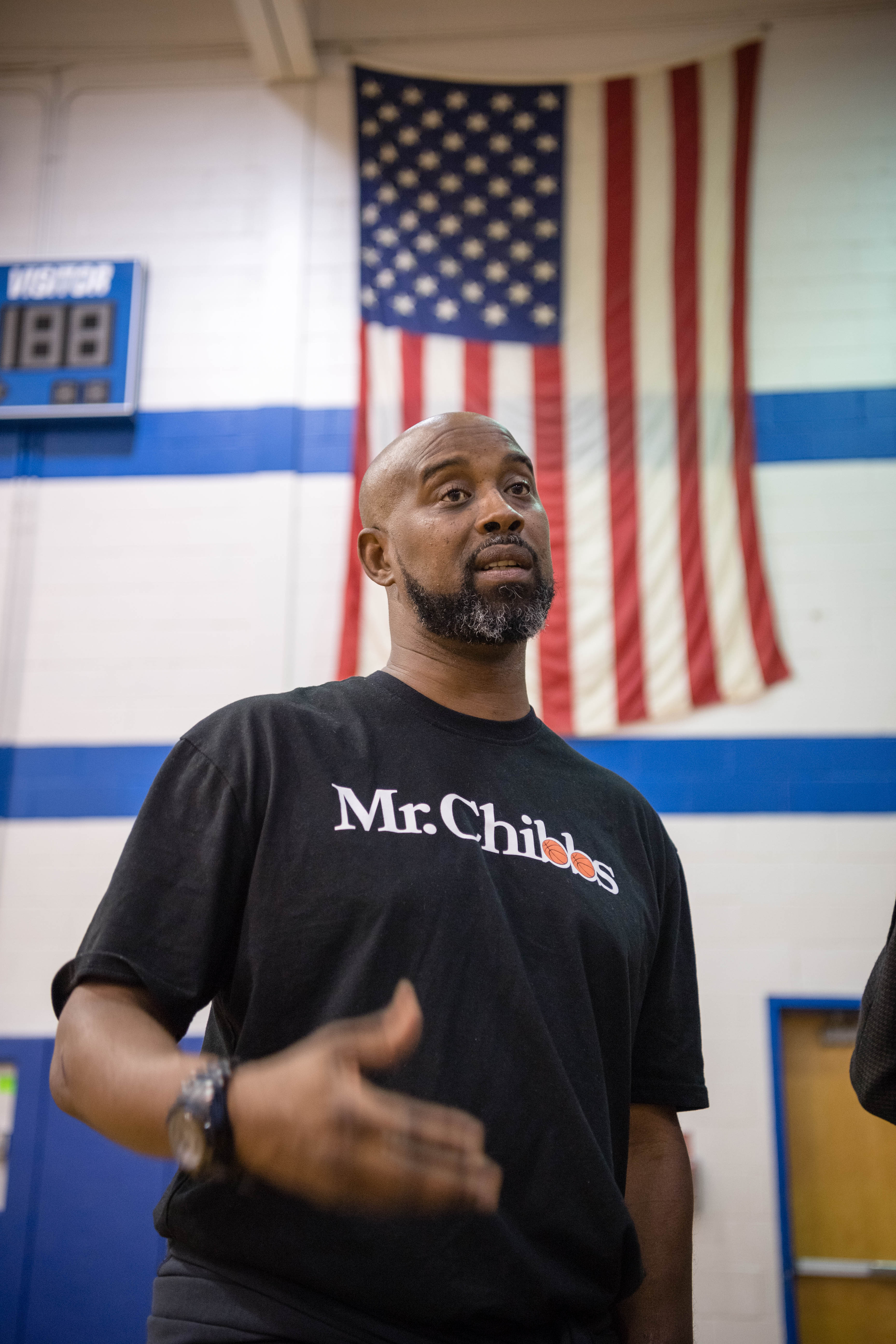
Kenny Anderson was selected 2nd overall by the New Jersey Nets.

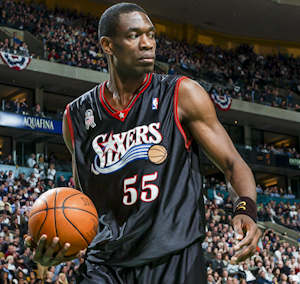
Dikembe Mutombo was selected 4th overall by the Denver Nuggets.

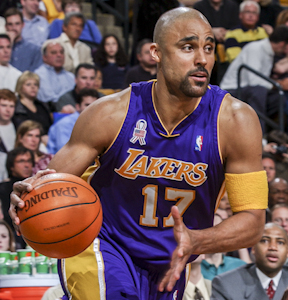
Rick Fox was selected 24th overall by the Boston Celtics.

PG	Point guard	SG	Shooting guard	SF	Small forward	PF	Power forward	C	Center

^	Denotes player who has been inducted to the Naismith Memorial Basketball Hall of Fame
*	Denotes player who has been selected for at least one All-Star Game and All-NBA Team
^{+}	Denotes player who has been selected for at least one All-Star Game
^{x}	Denotes player who has been selected for at least one All-NBA Team
^{#}	Denotes player who has never appeared in an NBA regular-season or playoff game
^{~}	Denotes player who has been selected as Rookie of the Year

Rnd.	Pick	Player	Pos.	Nationality (Note: Nationality indicates the player's national team or representative nationality. If a player has not competed at the international level, then the nationality indicates the national team which the player is eligible to represent according to FIBA rules.)	Team	School / club team
1	1	Larry Johnson*~	PF	United States	Charlotte Hornets	UNLV (Sr.)
1	2	Kenny Anderson^{+}	PG	United States	New Jersey Nets	Georgia Tech (So.)
1	3	Billy Owens	SF	United States	Sacramento Kings (traded to Golden State)	Syracuse (Jr.)
1	4	Dikembe Mutombo^	C	Zaire	Denver Nuggets	Georgetown (Sr.)
1	5	Steve Smith^{+}	SG	United States	Miami Heat	Michigan State (Sr.)
1	6	Doug Smith	PF	United States	Dallas Mavericks	Missouri (Sr.)
1	7	Luc Longley	C	Australia	Minnesota Timberwolves	New Mexico (Sr.)
1	8	Mark Macon	SG	United States	Denver Nuggets (from Washington)	Temple (Sr.)
1	9	Stacey Augmon	SG/SF	United States	Atlanta Hawks (from L.A. Clippers)	UNLV (Sr.)
1	10	Brian Williams^{[Note 1]}	PF/C	United States	Orlando Magic	Arizona (Jr.)
1	11	Terrell Brandon^{+}	PG	United States	Cleveland Cavaliers	Oregon (Jr.)
1	12	Greg Anthony	PG	United States	New York Knicks	UNLV (Sr.)
1	13	Dale Davis^{+}	PF	United States	Indiana Pacers	Clemson (Sr.)
1	14	Rich King	C	United States	Seattle SuperSonics	Nebraska (Sr.)
1	15	Anthony Avent	PF	United States	Atlanta Hawks	Seton Hall (Sr.)
1	16	Chris Gatling^{+}	PF	United States	Golden State Warriors (from Philadelphia)	Old Dominion (Sr.)
1	17	Victor Alexander	C	United States	Golden State Warriors	Iowa State (Sr.)
1	18	Kevin Brooks	SF	United States	Milwaukee Bucks	Southwestern Louisiana (Sr.)
1	19	LaBradford Smith	SG	United States	Washington Bullets (from Detroit via Dallas and Denver)	Louisville (Sr.)
1	20	John Turner	PF	United States	Houston Rockets	Phillips (Sr.)
1	21	Eric Murdock	PG	United States	Utah Jazz	Providence (Sr.)
1	22	LeRon Ellis	PF	United States	Los Angeles Clippers (from Phoenix via Seattle)	Syracuse (Sr.)
1	23	Stanley Roberts	C	United States	Orlando Magic (from San Antonio)	Real Madrid (Spain)
1	24	Rick Fox	SF	Canada	Boston Celtics	North Carolina (Sr.)
1	25	Shaun Vandiver^{#}	PF	United States	Golden State Warriors (from L.A. Lakers)	Colorado (Sr.)
1	26	Mark Randall	PF	United States	Chicago Bulls	Kansas (Sr.)
1	27	Pete Chilcutt	PF	United States	Sacramento Kings (from Portland)	North Carolina (Sr.)
2	28	Kevin Lynch	G/F	United States	Charlotte Hornets (from Denver)	Minnesota (Sr.)
2	29	George Ackles^{#}	C/PF	United States	Miami Heat	UNLV (Sr.)
2	30	Rodney Monroe	G/F	United States	Atlanta Hawks (from Sacramento)	NC State (Sr.)
2	31	Randy Brown	PG	United States	Sacramento Kings (from New Jersey)	New Mexico State (Sr.)
2	32	Chad Gallagher	C	United States	Phoenix Suns (from Charlotte)	Creighton (Sr.)
2	33	Donald Hodge	C	United States	Dallas Mavericks	Temple (Jr.)
2	34	Myron Brown	G	United States	Minnesota Timberwolves	Slippery Rock (Sr.)
2	35	Mike Iuzzolino	G	United States	Dallas Mavericks (from Washington via Sacramento)	Saint Francis (PA) (Sr.)
2	36	Chris Corchiani	G	United States	Orlando Magic	NC State (Sr.)
2	37	Elliot Perry	PG	United States	Los Angeles Clippers	Memphis State (Sr.)
2	38	Joe Wylie^{#}	PF	United States	Los Angeles Clippers (from Cleveland)	Miami (FL) (Sr.)
2	39	Jimmy Oliver	G/F	United States	Cleveland Cavaliers (from New York via Charlotte)	Purdue (Sr.)
2	40	Doug Overton	PG	United States	Detroit Pistons (from Seattle)	La Salle (Sr.)
2	41	Sean Green	F/G	United States	Indiana Pacers	Iona (Sr.)
2	42	Steve Hood^{#}	SF	United States	Sacramento Kings (from Atlanta)	James Madison (Sr.)
2	43	Lamont Strothers	G	United States	Golden State Warriors	Christopher Newport (Sr.)
2	44	Álvaro Teherán^{#}	C	Colombia	Philadelphia 76ers	Houston (Sr.)
2	45	Bobby Phills	SG	United States	Milwaukee Bucks	Southern (Sr.)
2	46	Richard Dumas	F	United States	Phoenix Suns (from Detroit)	Hapoel Holon (Israel)
2	47	Keith Hughes^{#}	PF	United States	Houston Rockets	Rutgers (Sr.)
2	48	Isaac Austin	C	United States	Utah Jazz	Arizona State (Sr.)
2	49	Greg Sutton	G	United States	San Antonio Spurs	Oral Roberts (Sr.)
2	50	Joey Wright^{#}	SG	United States	Phoenix Suns	Texas (Sr.)
2	51	Žan Tabak	C	Yugoslavia (Note: Croatia had declared independence just a day before the draft, but was not yet recognized by FIBA.)	Houston Rockets (from Boston via New Jersey and Cleveland)	KK Split (Yugoslavia)
2	52	Anthony Jones^{#}	SF	United States	Los Angeles Lakers	Oral Roberts (Sr.)
2	53	Von McDade^{#}	SG	United States	New Jersey Nets (from Chicago)	Milwaukee (Sr.)
2	54	Marcus Kennedy^{#}	PF	United States	Portland Trail Blazers	Eastern Michigan (Sr.)

== Notable undrafted players ==
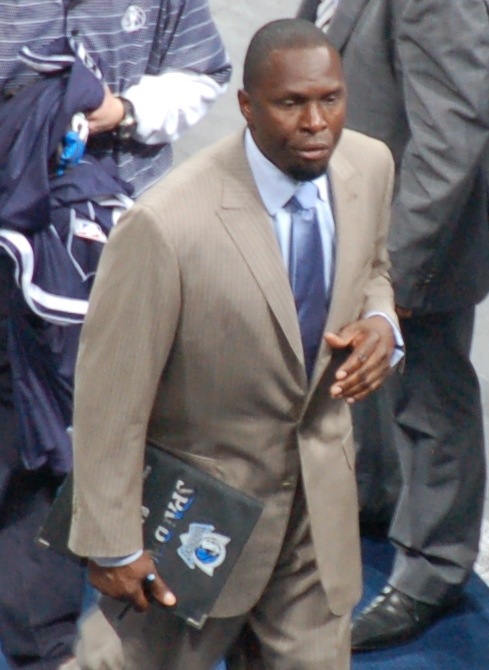
Darrell Armstrong was undrafted but had a 13-year career in the NBA and was the Sixth Man of the Year in 1999.

These eligible players were not selected in the 1991 NBA draft but have played at least one game in the NBA.

Player	Position	Nationality	School/Club team
Darrell Armstrong	PG	United States	Fayetteville State (Sr.)
James Blackwell	PG	United States	Dartmouth (Sr.)
Walter Bond	SG	United States	Minnesota (Sr.)
Mark Bradtke	C/PF	Australia	Adelaide 36ers (Australia)
Demetrius Calip	PG	United States	Michigan (Sr.)
John Crotty	PG	United States	Virginia (Sr.)
Corey Crowder	SG/SF	United States	Kentucky Wesleyan (Sr.)
Emanual Davis	PG/SG	United States	Delaware State (Sr.)
Patrick Eddie	C	United States	Ole Miss (Sr.)
Vincenzo Esposito	SG	Italy	S.C. Juventus Phonola Caserta (Italy)
Tony Farmer	PF	United States	Nebraska (Sr.)
Jay Guidinger	C	United States	Minnesota–Duluth (Sr.)
Reggie Hanson	SF	United States	Kentucky (Sr.)
Jerome Harmon	SG	United States	Louisville (Sr.)
Keith Jennings	PG	United States	East Tennessee State (Sr.)
Reggie Jordan	SG	United States	New Mexico State (Sr.)
Cedric Lewis	C	United States	Maryland (Sr.)
Keith Owens	F	United States	UCLA (Sr.)
Robert Pack	PG	United States	USC (Sr.)
Larry Stewart	SF	United States	Coppin State (Sr.)
Brett Szabo	C	United States	Augustana (South Dakota) (Sr.)
Carl Thomas	SG	United States	Eastern Michigan (Sr.)
Charles Thomas	SG	United States	Eastern Michigan (Sr.)
Donald Whiteside	PG	United States	Northern Illinois (Sr.)
Lorenzo Williams	PF/C	United States	Stetson (Sr.)
Travis Williams	SF	United States	South Carolina State (Sr.)

== Early entrants ==
=== College underclassmen ===
For the ninth year in a row and the thirteenth time in fourteen years, no college underclassman would withdraw their entry into the NBA draft. Not only that, but this would be the second time in NBA history (and the second time in three years) where an international player would be considered a direct underclassman to participate in an NBA draft, with Žan Tabak of the KK POP 84 of the Eastern Bloc nation known as SFR Yugoslavia (now since separated, with Tabak representing Croatia) being the second ever international underclassman to be taken directly from an overseas team without previously going to an American college or playing for any prior American institution (the first being fellow Yugoslavian Vlade Divac). In addition to that, this was also the sixth straight year where at least one player that previously played basketball collegiately would go play professionally overseas, with Richard Dumas from Oklahoma State University would play for Hapoel Holon B.C. in Israel, the Israeli born Nadav Henefeld from the University of Connecticut would play for the rivaling Maccabi Tel Aviv B.C. in his home nation, and Stanley Roberts from Louisiana State University would play for Real Madrid Baloncesto in Spain. Including those four people, the total number of underclassmen would increase from ten to fourteen players. Regardless, the following college basketball players successfully applied for early draft entrance.

- (United States) Kenny Anderson – G, Georgia Tech (sophomore)
- (United States) Terrell Brandon – G, Oregon (junior)
- (United States) Tony Farmer – F, Nebraska (junior)
- (United States) Jerome Harmon – G, Louisville (junior)
- (United States) Donald Hodge – C, Temple (junior)
- (United States) Anderson Hunt – G, UNLV (junior)
- (United States) Raoul Hutchens – G, Whittier (junior)
- (United States) Ty Moseler – G, Waukesha County Tech (sophomore)
- (United States) Chancellor Nichols – F, James Madison (junior)
- (United States) Billy Owens – F, Syracuse (junior)
- (United States) Brian Williams – F/C, Arizona (junior)

=== International players ===
This would be the second time in NBA history where an international born and raised player would be considered an underclassman in an NBA draft, as well as the second time a player from the now-former nation of SFR Yugoslavia would enter the NBA draft as such a player. The following international player successfully applied for early draft entrance.

- (Socialist Federal Republic of Yugoslavia) / (Croatia) Žan Tabak – C, Split (Yugoslavia)

=== Other eligible players ===
This would be the sixth year in a row with at least one player that previously played in college entering the NBA draft as an underclassman, as well as the first year where multiple underclassmen that went overseas to play professionally would play in the same nation as each other (albeit for different teams).

Player	Team	Note	Ref.
(United States) Richard Dumas	Hapoel Holon (Israel)	Left Oklahoma State in 1990; playing professionally since the 1990–91 season	
(Israel) Nadav Henefeld	Maccabi Tel Aviv (Israel)	Left UConn in 1990; playing professionally since the 1990–91 season	
(United States) Stanley Roberts	Real Madrid (Spain)	Left LSU in 1990; playing professionally since the 1990–91 season	

== Invited attendees ==
The 1991 NBA draft is considered to be the fourteenth NBA draft to have utilized what's properly considered the "green room" experience for NBA prospects. The NBA's green room is a staging area where anticipated draftees often sit with their families and representatives, waiting for their names to be called on draft night. Often being positioned either in front of or to the side of the podium (in this case, being positioned somewhere within the main building of the Madison Square Garden), once a player heard his name, he would walk to the podium to shake hands and take promotional photos with the NBA commissioner. From there, the players often conducted interviews with various media outlets while backstage. From there, the players often conducted interviews with various media outlets while backstage. However, once the NBA draft started to air nationally on TV starting with the 1980 NBA draft, the green room evolved from players waiting to hear their name called and then shaking hands with these select players who were often called to the hotel to take promotional pictures with the NBA commissioner a day or two after the draft concluded to having players in real-time waiting to hear their names called up and then shaking hands with David Stern, the NBA's commissioner at the time. The NBA compiled its list of green room invites through collective voting by the NBA's team presidents and general managers alike, which in this year's case belonged to only what they believed were the top 14 prospects at the time. Despite the large amount of invites and them successfully avoiding any inviting prospects waiting into the second round (to the point where the only error in mind from getting a perfectly ordered invited attendees line-up was leaving out Dale Davis from Clemson University), two notable absences from this group include the aforementioned Dale Davis from Clemson University and Chris Gatling from Old Dominion University, making this the most accurate green room draft invite list for the NBA yet. Even so, the following players were invited to attend this year's draft festivities live and in person.

- (United States) Kenny Anderson – PG, Georgia Tech
- (United States) Greg Anthony – PG, UNLV
- (United States) Stacey Augmon – SG/SF, UNLV
- (United States) Anthony Avent – PF, Seton Hall
- (United States) Terrell Brandon – PG, Oregon
- (United States) Larry Johnson – PF, UNLV
- (United States) Rich King – C, Nebraska
- (Australia) Luc Longley – C, New Mexico
- (United States) Mark Macon – SG, Temple
- (Zaire) / (Democratic Republic of the Congo) Dikembe Mutombo – C, Georgetown
- (United States) Billy Owens – SF, Syracuse
- (United States) Doug Smith – PF, Missouri
- (United States) Steve Smith – SG, Michigan State
- (United States) Brian Williams – PF/C, Arizona

== Notes ==
1. Brian Williams changed his name to Bison Dele in 1998.

== See also ==
- List of first overall NBA draft picks
