= Ty Nurse =

Canadian professional basketball player (born 1990)

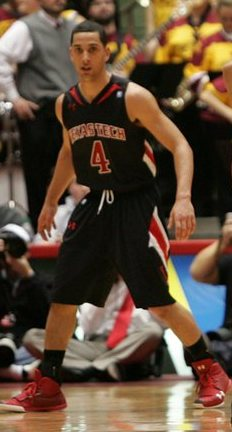
- Nurse at Texas Tech

No. 4 – Halifax Hurricanes
- Position: Point guard
- League: NBL Canada

Personal information
- Born: July 30, 1990 (age 36) Vancouver, British Columbia
- Listed height: 6 ft 1 in (1.85 m)
- Listed weight: 185 lb (84 kg)

Career information
- High school: Kitsilano (Vancouver, British Columbia)
- College: Midland (2009–2011); Texas Tech (2011–2013)
- NBA draft: 2013: undrafted
- Playing career: 2013–present

Career history
- 2015–present: Halifax Hurricanes

Typhoon Dusk Nurse (born July 3, 1990) is a Canadian professional basketball player.

== High school career ==
In 2006, Nurse starred in the Telus British Columbia AAA boys tournament for Kitsilano. He was the youngest player on the team. He subsequently played prep school ball at Decatur Christian High School in Illinois before going to St Mary’s Catholic school.

== College career ==
Nurse began his college career in Midland College. In 2011, he averaged 9.15 points-per-game, was an 82 percent free throw shooter (54-of-66), shot 54 percent behind the arc, dealt out 99 total assists and committed just 45 turnovers in 32 games. He was an All-Conference and All-Region performer and was also tabbed the team's most valuable player. During his time in Midland, the Chaps compiled an impressive 63-7 overall record and a 25-3 mark in conference play. He also led his school to NJCAA Men's Division I Basketball Championship title game in 2011. Shortly after, he inked a National Letter of Intent with nearby Texas Tech under the newly hired Billy Gillispie.

Nurse led the team with 29 points in his debut with Texas Tech on November 12, 2011 in a victory over Troy. He is the school's second leading scorer in the current season.

Nurse also competed for the Canadian Junior National Team, placing seventh at the 2009 FIBA U19 World Championships in New Zealand. He also won a bronze medal with Canada at the 2009 FIBA world qualifier in Argentina as well as leading Canada to the 2009 Douai World Tournament title in Northern France.

== Professional career ==
In January 2016, Nurse signed with the Halifax Hurricanes of the NBL Canada, replacing Alex Johnson. He would help Halifax win the NBL Championship that year.

== Personal ==
Nurse was an accounting major in Texas Tech. He has a brother, Nile, and a sister, Neena.
