= Chris Reisman =

American basketball coach (born 1978)

Biographical details
- Born: December 30, 1978 (age 47); Jonesboro, Arkansas, U.S.

Playing career
- 1998–2002: Tarleton State

Coaching career (HC unless noted)
- 2002–2004: Tarleton State (graduate assistant)
- 2004–2006: Tarleton State (assistant)
- 2006–2018: Tarleton State (associate head coach)
- 2018–2020: Tarleton State

Head coaching record
- Overall: 39–22 (.639)

Christopher Reisman (born December 30, 1978) is an American basketball coach who was most recently the head coach of the Tarleton State Texans men's basketball team. He is currently the assistant athletic director of Student-Athlete Development and Strategic Initiatives.

== Early life and education ==
Reisman was born in Jonesboro, Arkansas and grew up in Stephenville, Texas, where his father Lonn Reisman was the head coach at Tarleton State. Chris attended Stephenville High School where he was three-year letterman on the basketball team. He earned first team all-district and all-region honors and led his senior team to the area finals as a senior before graduating in 1997.

Reisman played at Tarleton State before graduating in 2002. He was a starter his last two seasons and finished his career ranked sixth on Tarleton's all-time assists chart with 281. Reisman considered going into medicine before deciding to become a coach.

== Coaching career ==
Reisman began his coaching career as a graduate assistant at Tarleton State in 2002. In 2004, he was promoted to an assistant coach under his father. He became the associate head coach in 2006. As an assistant, Reisman helped Tarleton State make 14 NCAA tournament appearances, win four NCAA Division II South Central regional championships and make two trips to the NCAA Division II Final Four. He was in charge of recruiting, scouting, academic counseling and individual development. After his father stepped down in 2018, Reisman was promoted to head coach. In two seasons, he led the team to a 39–22 record. In March 2020, he resigned to become the assistant athletic director of Student-Athlete Development and Strategic Initiatives. Billy Gillispie, former head coach at Kentucky, replaced Reisman as coach of Tarleton State.

== Head coaching record ==
Record table
Season	Team	Overall	Conference	Standing	Postseason
Tarleton State (Lone Star Conference) (2018–2020)
2018–19	Tarleton State	21–10	10–8		
2019–20	Tarleton State	18–12	13–9		
Tarleton State:		39–22 (.639)	23–17 (.575)		
Total:		39–22 (.639)			
National champion Postseason invitational champion Conference regular season champion Conference regular season and conference tournament champion Division regular season champion Division regular season and conference tournament champion Conference tournament champion
