= Graford High School =

Coordinates: 32.9397°N 98.2526°W

Location
- 400 W Division St. Graford, Texas 76449-9701; United States

Information
- School type: Public high school
- School district: Graford Independent School District
- Principal: Neil Mesler
- Staff: 37.68 (FTE)
- Grades: 6–12
- Enrollment: 330 (2023-2024)
- Student to teacher ratio: 8.76
- Colors: Black & White
- Athletics conference: UIL Class 2A
- Mascot: Jackrabbit
- Website: Graford High School website

Graford High School is a 2A high school located in Graford, Texas, United States. It is part of the Graford Independent School District located in north-central Palo Pinto County. In 2011, the school was rated "academically acceptable" by the Texas Education Agency.

== Athletics ==
The Graford Jackrabbits compete in the following sports:

Cross-country running, volleyball, basketball, track and field, softball, and baseball

=== State titles ===
- Boys basketball
  - 2022 (1A)
  - 2023 (1A)

== Notable people ==
Billy Gillispie is now head coach at Tarleton State University Men's Basketball team.
