= 2022–23 Tarleton State Texans men's basketball team =

American college basketball season

2022–23 Tarleton State Texans men's basketball

CBI, first round
- Conference: Western Athletic Conference
- Record: 17–17 (9–9 WAC)
- Head coach: Billy Gillispie (3rd season)
- Assistant coaches: Zach Settembre; Noah Croak; Joseph Jones
- Home arena: Wisdom Gym

2022–23 WAC men's basketball standings
	Conf.				Overall
Team	W		L	PCT	W		L	PCT
Utah Valley	15	–	3	.833	28	–	9	.757
Sam Houston	14	–	4	.778	26	–	8	.765
Southern Utah	12	–	6	.667	24	–	13	.649
Grand Canyon †	11	–	7	.611	24	–	12	.667
Seattle	11	–	7	.611	20	–	12	.625
Stephen F. Austin	11	–	7	.611	19	–	13	.594
Tarleton State *	9	–	9	.500	17	–	17	.500
California Baptist	8	–	10	.444	17	–	16	.515
Abilene Christian	7	–	11	.389	13	–	17	.433
UT Rio Grande Valley	6	–	12	.333	15	–	17	.469
UT Arlington	6	–	12	.333	11	–	21	.344
Utah Tech *	5	–	13	.278	14	–	19	.424
New Mexico State **	2	–	16	.111	9	–	15	.375
† Conference tournament winner * Ineligible for the NCAA tournament due to transition from NCAA Division II ** Remaining games as of February 11, 2023 cancelled.

The 2022–23 Tarleton State Texans men's basketball team represented Tarleton State University in the 2022–23 NCAA Division I men's basketball season. The Texans, led by third-year head coach Billy Gillispie, played their home games at the Wisdom Gym in Stephenville, Texas as members of the Western Athletic Conference (WAC).

The season marked Tarleton State's third year of a four-year transition period from Division II to Division I. As a result, the Texans were not eligible to play in the NCAA tournament, but were eligible to play in the WAC tournament. Additionally, the Texas received an invitation to the College Basketball Invitational (CBI), their first postseason tournament as a Division I school.

== Previous season ==
The Texans finished the 2021–22 season 14–17, 9–9 in WAC play, to finish in eighth place. Due to their current transition to Division I, they were ineligible for the WAC tournament.

== Roster ==
2022–23 Tarleton State Texans men's basketball team
Players
Coaches

Pos.	#	Name	Height	Weight	Year	Previous school	Hometown
F	0	Rod Brown	6 ft 7 in (2.01 m)	202 lb (92 kg)	GS	Jacksonville	Memphis, TN
G	1	Noah McDavid	6 ft 5 in (1.96 m)	—	So	Lake Highlands HS	Dallas, TX
G/F	2	Freddy Hicks	6 ft 6 in (1.98 m)	210 lb (95 kg)	So	Searcy HS	Searcy, AR
G	3	Shamir Bogues	6 ft 4 in (1.93 m)	190 lb (86 kg)	So	Killeen Ellison HS	Killeen, TX
G	4	Mareng Gatkuoth	6 ft 6 in (1.98 m)	190 lb (86 kg)	Jr	Montana State	Anchorage, AK
G	5	Lue Williams	6 ft 5 in (1.96 m)	194 lb (88 kg)	Jr	Coastal Alabama CC–South	Atmore, AL
G	10	Lajae Jones	6 ft 7 in (2.01 m)	200 lb (91 kg)	Fr	Fletcher HS	Jacksonville, FL
G	12	Tiger Booker	5 ft 10 in (1.78 m)	180 lb (82 kg)	Jr	New Mexico JC	Chicago, IL
G	13	Shakur Daniel	6 ft 6 in (1.98 m)	185 lb (84 kg)	GS	Ranger College	Toronto, ON
G	14	Javontae Hopkins	6 ft 0 in (1.83 m)	165 lb (75 kg)	Jr	Fort Bend Travis HS	Houston, TX
F	15	KiAndre Gaddy	6 ft 6 in (1.98 m)	223 lb (101 kg)	Jr	Walla Walla	Dallas, TX
G	20	Luke Winslow	6 ft 2 in (1.88 m)	—	So	Christian Heritage Academy	Oklahoma City, OK
G	22	Jalen Thomas	6 ft 0 in (1.83 m)	185 lb (84 kg)	Jr	Oklahoma Panhandle State	Amarillo, TX
F	23	Jakorie Smith	6 ft 6 in (1.98 m)	213 lb (97 kg)	Jr	East Mississippi CC	Utica, MS
G	24	Nasan Ayala	6 ft 3 in (1.91 m)	197 lb (89 kg)	Jr	Pratt CC	Queens, NY
F	25	Coreyoun Rushin	6 ft 6 in (1.98 m)	198 lb (90 kg)	GS	Chicago State	Chicago, IL
F	33	Garry Clark	6 ft 7 in (2.01 m)	202 lb (92 kg)	So	Western Texas College	St. Louis, MO
G	35	Timothy Ferguson	6 ft 2 in (1.88 m)	178 lb (81 kg)	Fr	Melissa HS	Melissa, TX
G	44	Tydan Archibald	6 ft 0 in (1.83 m)	181 lb (82 kg)	Jr	Southern Arkansas	Katy, TX

Head coach

- Billy Gillispie (Texas State)

Assistant coach(es)

- Zach Settembre (LSU–Shreveport)
- Noah Croak (Indiana)
- Joseph Jones (Texas A&M)

Legend

- (C) Team captain
- (S) Suspended
- (I) Ineligible
- (W) Walk-on
- Injured
- Current redshirt

Roster
Last update: January 1, 2023

== Schedule and results ==
Date time, TV	Rank^{#}	Opponent^{#}	Result	Record	Site (attendance) city, state
Exhibition
October 30, 2022*; 5:00 p.m.		UNT Dallas	W 83–48	–	Wisdom Gym (618); Stephenville, TX
Regular season
November 7, 2022*; 6:00 p.m., P12N		at Arizona State	L 59–62	0–1	Desert Financial Arena (6,304); Tempe, AZ
November 10, 2022*; 7:00 p.m., ESPN+		Kansas Christian	W 95–49	1–1	Wisdom Gym (1,386); Stephenville, TX
November 18, 2022*; 4:45 p.m., ESPN3		vs. Belmont; Paradise Jam first round	W 89–81	2–1	Sports and Fitness Center; St. Thomas, USVI
November 20, 2022*; 7:00 p.m., ESPN3		vs. Boston College; Paradise Jam semifinals	W 70–54	3–1	Sports and Fitness Center (1,224); St. Thomas, USVI
November 21, 2022*; 7:00 p.m., ESPN3		vs. Drake; Paradise Jam championship	L 64–71	3–2	Sports and Fitness Center (1,424); St. Thomas, USVI
November 26, 2022*; 3:00 p.m., ESPN+		at Wichita State	L 71–83	3–3	Charles Koch Arena (7,299); Wichita, KS
November 29, 2022*; 7:00 p.m., ESPN+		Weber State	W 75–65	4–3	Wisdom Gym (1,873); Stephenville, TX
December 3, 2022*; 2:00 p.m., ESPN+		Wiley	W 98–55	5–3	Wisdom Gym (776); Stephenville, TX
December 6, 2022*; 7:00 p.m., Big 12 Now		at No. 12 Baylor	L 57–80	5–4	Ferrell Center (8,527); Waco, TX
December 11, 2022*; 11:00 a.m., ESPN+		at UCF	L 49–75	5–5	Addition Financial Arena (3,880); Orlando, FL
December 18, 2022*; 2:30 p.m., MW Network		at Air Force	L 67–81	5–6	Clune Arena (1,038); Colorado Springs, CO
December 21, 2022*; 7:00 p.m., ESPN+		Huston–Tillotson	W 114–56	6–6	Wisdom Gym (856); Stephenville, TX
December 29, 2022; 7:00 p.m., ESPN+		UT Arlington	W 70–63	7–6 (1–0)	Wisdom Gym (1,533); Stephenville, TX
December 31, 2022; 3:00 p.m., ESPN+		at Abilene Christian	L 63–69	7–7 (1–1)	Moody Coliseum (1,152); Abilene, TX
January 5, 2023; 7:00 p.m., ESPN+		Southern Utah	W 68–65	8–7 (2–1)	Wisdom Gym (1,105); Stephenville, TX
January 7, 2023; 4:30 p.m., ESPN+		at Sam Houston	L 68–75	8–8 (2–2)	Bernard Johnson Coliseum (1,702); Huntsville, TX
January 11, 2023*; 7:00 p.m., ESPN+		Chicago State	W 73–63	9–8	Wisdom Gym (1,487); Stephenville, TX
January 14, 2023; 4:00 p.m., ESPN+		Abilene Christian	W 72–63	10–8 (3–2)	Wisdom Gym (1,424); Stephenville, TX
January 19, 2023; 9:00 p.m., ESPN+		at Seattle	L 47–67	10–9 (3–3)	Redhawk Center (901); Seattle, WA
January 21, 2023; 9:00 p.m., ESPN+		at California Baptist	L 48–77	10–10 (3–4)	CBU Events Center (4,011); Riverside, CA
January 26, 2023; 7:00 p.m., ESPN+		Utah Tech	W 74–72	11–10 (4–4)	Wisdom Gym (4,013); Stephenville, TX
January 28, 2023; 7:00 p.m., ESPN+		Grand Canyon	W 81–62	12–10 (5–4)	Wisdom Gym (2,155); Stephenville, TX
February 4, 2023; 4:00 p.m., ESPN+		Texas–Rio Grande Valley	L 65–68	12–11 (5–5)	Wisdom Gym (1,578); Stephenville, TX
February 6, 2023; 4:00 p.m., ESPN+		at UT Arlington; Rescheduled from February 1	W 69–64	13–11 (6–5)	College Park Center (423); Arlington, TX
February 9, 2023; 8:00 p.m., ESPN+		at Southern Utah	L 62–72	13–12 (6–6)	America First Event Center (1,862); Cedar City, UT
February 11, 2023; 8:00 p.m., ESPN+		at Utah Tech	W 75–71	14–12 (7–6)	Burns Arena (1,929); St. George, UT
February 15, 2023; 6:30 p.m., ESPN+		at Stephen F. Austin	L 60–65	14–13 (7–7)	William R. Johnson Coliseum (2,180); Nacogdoches, TX
February 18, 2023; 7:00 p.m., ESPN+		Sam Houston	L 59–64	14–14 (7–8)	Wisdom Gym (2,367); Stephenville, TX
February 23, 2023; 7:00 p.m., ESPN+		Utah Valley	W 77–58	15–14 (8–8)	Wisdom Gym (2,017); Stephenville, TX
February 25, 2023; 6:30 p.m., ESPN+		at Texas–Rio Grande Valley	L 95–99 ^{OT}	15–15 (8–9)	UTRGV Fieldhouse (1,431); Edinburg, TX
February 28, 2023*; 8:00 p.m.		SAGU	W 110–45	16–15	Wisdom Gym (1,776); Stephenville, TX
March 3, 2023; 7:00 p.m., ESPN+		New Mexico State	W 2–0 Forfeit	(9–9)	Wisdom Gym; Stephenville, TX
WAC tournament
March 7, 2023; 6:00 p.m., ESPN+	(7)	vs. (10) UT Rio Grande Valley; First round	W 74–70	17–15	Michelob Ultra Arena; Paradise, NV
March 9, 2023; 6:00 p.m., ESPN+	(7)	vs. (2) Utah Valley; Quarterfinals	L 58–72	17–16	Orleans Arena; Paradise, NV
College Basketball Invitational
March 19, 2023; 4:00 p.m., FloHoops	(7)	vs. (10) Radford; First round	L 70–72 ^{OT}	17–17	Ocean Center; Daytona Beach, FL
*Non-conference game. ^{#}Rankings from AP poll. (#) Tournament seedings in parentheses. All times are in Central.
