= Graford, Texas =

- City
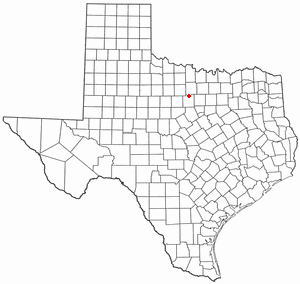
- Location of Graford, Texas

- Coordinates: 32°56′15″N 98°15′00″W
- Country: United States
- State: Texas
- County: Palo Pinto

Area
  - Total: 0.72 sq mi (1.86 km^{2})
  - Land: 0.72 sq mi (1.86 km^{2})
  - Water: 0 sq mi (0.00 km^{2})
- Elevation: 961 ft (293 m)

Population (2020)
  - Total: 669
  - Density: 932/sq mi (360/km^{2})
- Time zone: UTC-6 (Central (CST))
  - Summer (DST): UTC-5 (CDT)
- ZIP code: 76449
- Area code: 940
- FIPS code: 48-30380
- GNIS feature ID: 2410627

Graford is a city in Palo Pinto County, Texas, United States. Its population was 669 at the 2020 census.

== Geography ==
According to the United States Census Bureau, the city has a total area of 0.7 square miles (1.8 km^{2}), all land.

== Demographics ==
Historical population
Census	Pop.	Note	%±
1930	481		—
1940	804		67.2%
1950	655		−18.5%
1960	448		−31.6%
1970	613		36.8%
1980	495		−19.2%
1990	561		13.3%
2000	578		3.0%
2010	584		1.0%
2020	669		14.6%
U.S. Decennial Census

=== 2020 census ===
As of the 2020 census, Graford had a population of 669 and a median age of 35.8 years; 27.5% of residents were under 18 and 13.3% were 65 or older. For every 100 females, there were 97.9 males, and for every 100 females 18 and over, there were 102.1 males age 18 and over.

None of the residents lived in urban areas, while 100.0% lived in rural areas.

Of the 236 households in Graford, 39.8% had children under 18 living in them, 51.3% were married-couple households, 14.8% were households with a male householder and no spouse or partner present, and 25.8% were households with a female householder and no spouse or partner present. About 18.7% of all households were made up of individuals, and 8.9% had someone living alone who was 65 or older.

The city had 266 housing units, of which 11.3% were vacant. The homeowner vacancy rate was 1.7% and the rental vacancy rate was 6.2%.

Racial composition as of the 2020 census
Race	Number	Percentage
White	524	78.3%
Black or African American	1	0.1%
American Indian and Alaska Native	1	0.1%
Some other race	84	12.6%
Two or more races	59	8.8%
Hispanic or Latino (of any race)	118	17.6%

=== 2000 census ===
As of the census of 2000, 578 people, 213 households, and 145 families resided in the city. The population density was 819.9 inhabitants per square mile (316.6/km^{2}). The 238 housing units averaged 337.6 per square mile (131.3/km^{2}). The racial makeup of the city was 94.64% White, 0.69% Native American, 3.63% from other races, and 1.04% from two or more races. Hispanics or Latinos of any race were 4.84% of the population.

Of the 213 households, 36.6% had children under 18 living with them, 58.2% were married couples living together, 8.5% had a female householder with no husband present, and 31.5% were not families. About 26.8% of all households were made up of individuals, and 14.6% had someone living alone who was 65 or older. The average household size was 2.71, and the average family size was 3.38.

In the city, the population was distributed as 30.1% under 18, 7.3% from 18 to 24, 27.9% from 25 to 44, 23.2% from 45 to 64, and 11.6% who were 65 or older. The median age was 34 years. For every 100 females, there were 104.2 males. For every 100 females 18 and over, there were 94.2 males.

The median income in the city for a household was $30,972 and for a family was $33,676. Males had a median income of $25,885 versus $18,182 for females. The per capita income for the city was $12,648. About 9.1% of families and 12.1% of the population were below the poverty line, including 10.6% of those under 8 and 19.7% of those 65 or over.

== Education ==
The City of Graford is served by the Graford Independent School District and home to the Graford High School Jackrabbits.

== Notable people ==
- Billy Gillispie, head coach of the Tarleton State men's basketball team
- Glenn Rogers, Republican member of the Texas House of Representatives from District 60
