= Maccabi Ra'anana =

- Leagues: Liga Leumit
- Founded: 1980; 46 years ago
- History: Maccabi Ra'anana; 1980–2002; Bnei Hasharon; 2002–2011; Maccabi Ra'anana; 2011–present
- Arena: Metro West
- Capacity: 1,850
- Location: Ra'anana
- Team colors: Blue and white
- Head coach: Guni Israeli
- Team captain: Willy Workman
Home	Away

Maccabi Ra'anana (Hebrew: מכבי עירוני רעננה) is an Israeli professional basketball club based in Ra'anana, Israel. The club currently plays in the Liga Leumit, the second tier on the basketball pyramid of Israel, following their relegation from the Israeli Basketball Premier League at the end of the 2025–26 season.

== History ==
Maccabi Ra'anana was founded in 1980. The team won the Israeli 2nd Division championship of the 1995–96 season. The club then competed in Israel's top-level Israeli Super League, for the first time, in the following 1996–97 season.

Maccabi Ra'anana competed in the European-wide secondary level FIBA Saporta Cup, in the 1999–00 season. They also finished as the runner-up of the Israeli Super League in the 1999–00 season. After that, the team subsequently competed in one of the two top-level European-wide competitions at that time, the FIBA SuproLeague, in the following 2000–01 season. In the 2001–02 season, they competed in the Pan-European third-level competition, the FIBA Korac Cup.

In 2002, due to financial problems, the club merged with Hapoel Herzliya, which was then renamed to Bnei Hasharon. In 2011, the merger of the two clubs ended, and from that point, the club again competed under its original Maccabi Ra'anana name. Maccabi Ra'anana won the Israeli Basketball Association Cup (Israel's 2nd Division Cup), in the 2011–12 season.

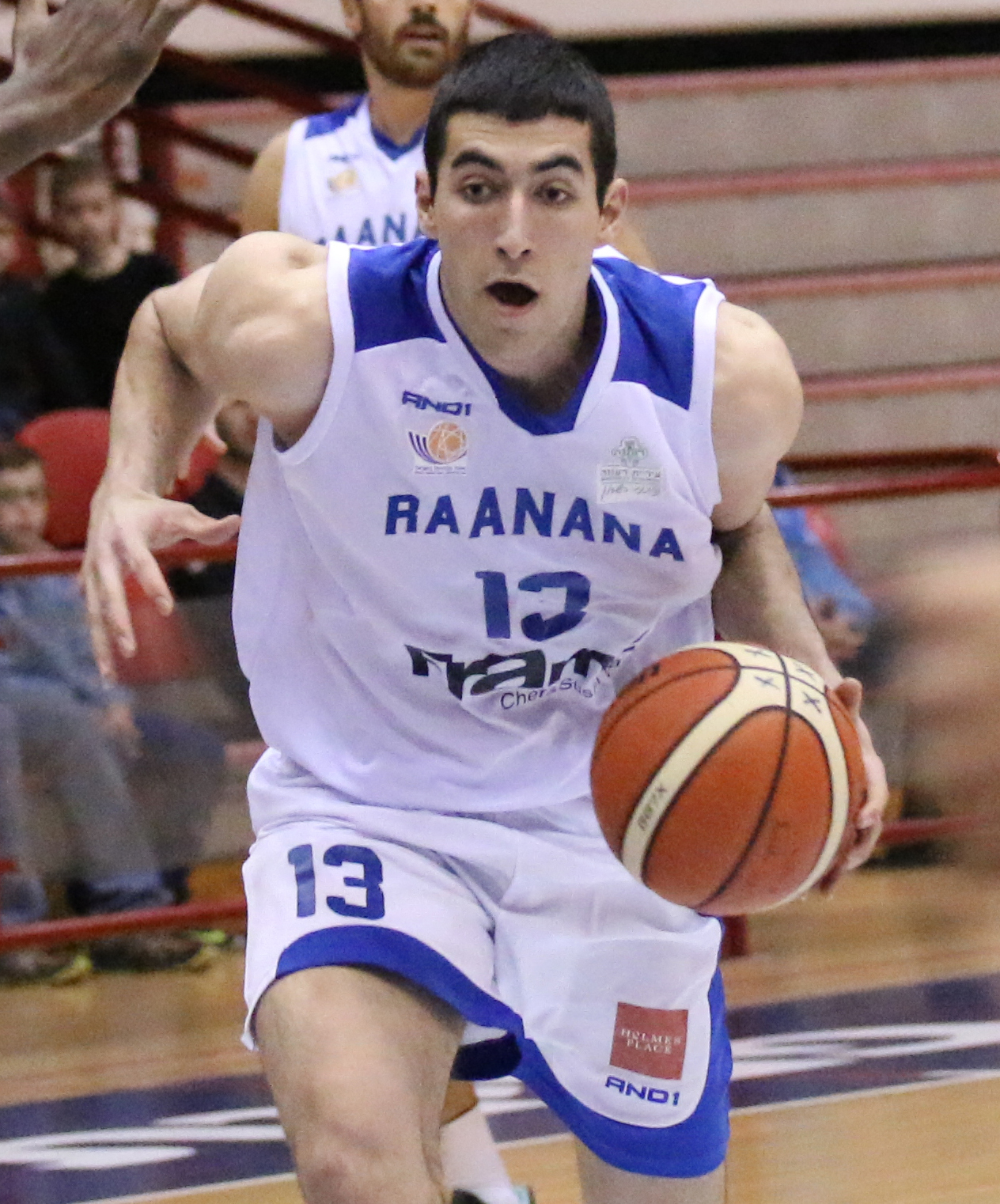
Yovel Zoosman with Maccabi Ra'anana in 2017.

In 2022, Maccabi Ra'anana made a preseason tour through the United States, facing three National Basketball Association (NBA) teams: the Los Angeles Clippers, Portland Trail Blazers and the Oklahoma City Thunder, losing all three games.

In 2023, Maccabi Ra'anana made another preseason tour through the United States, facing three National Basketball Association (NBA) teams: the Brooklyn Nets, Cleveland Cavaliers and the Minnesota Timberwolves, losing all three games. However, the tour was overshadowed by the October 7 attacks that occurred five days prior and the outbreak of the Gaza war.

== Titles and honors ==
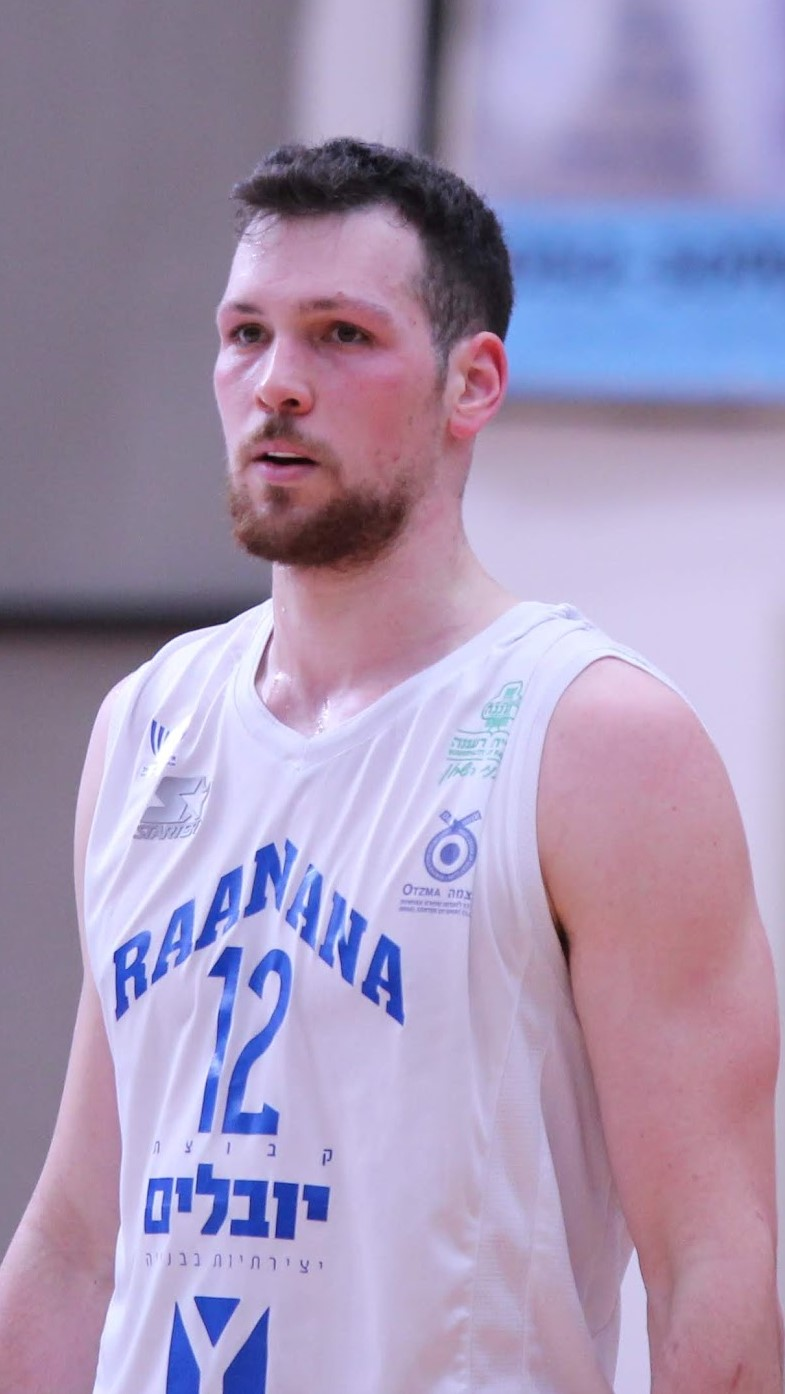
Uriel Trocki in 2020.

=== Domestic competitions ===
- Israeli Championship

Runners-up (1): 2000

==== Lower division competitions ====
- Israeli 2nd Division

Champions (1): 1996

- Association Cup

Winners (1): 2012

== Players ==
=== Current roster ===
Maccabi Ra'anana roster
Players
Coaches

Pos.	No.	Nat.	Name	Ht.	Age
G	0	(United States)	Ragland, Joe	1.83 m (6 ft 0 in)	36 – 28 November 1989
SF	1	(United States) (Israel)	Workman, Willy	1.98 m (6 ft 6 in)	36 – 14 March 1990
G/F	2	(United States)	Barnes, Davon	1.93 m (6 ft 4 in)	23 – 21 November 2002
SF	4	(Israel)	Guy, Chen (C)	1.94 m (6 ft 4 in)	25 – 25 December 2000
G	6	(Israel)	Scheller, Yoav	1.90 m (6 ft 3 in)	22 – 6 January 2004
G	7	(Israel)	Peleg, Yahel	1.90 m (6 ft 3 in)	24 – 29 May 2002
F	8	(Israel)	Goffer, Nadav	1.99 m (6 ft 6 in)	18 – 1 October 2008
G	9	(Israel)	Shelef, Omri	1.96 m (6 ft 5 in)	22 – 30 July 2004
G	10	(Israel)	Cohen, Ron	1.91 m (6 ft 3 in)	24 – 13 July 2002
G/F	11	(United States)	Albert, Braele	1.96 m (6 ft 5 in)	25 – 8 June 2001
F/C	14	(Israel)	Ovadia, Ori	2.02 m (6 ft 8 in)	21 – 24 February 2005
G	15	(Israel)	Sultan, Eyal	1.80 m (5 ft 11 in)	20 – 24 May 2006
F/C	26	(Israel)	Amiram, Yariv	2.04 m (6 ft 8 in)	32 – 16 January 1994
F/C	32	(United States)	Hawley, Josh	2.02 m (6 ft 8 in)	29 – 28 October 1996
G	35	(Israel)	Simmons, Alon	1.90 m (6 ft 3 in)	21 – 20 September 2005

Head coach

- (Israel) Guni Israeli

Assistant coach(es)

- (Israel) Tal Rudni
- (Israel) Ohad Zohar

Physiotherapist(s)

- (Israel) Alon Sapir

Legend

- (C) Team captain
- Injured

- Roster
Updated: October 1, 2026

=== Depth chart ===
Pos.	Starting 5	Bench 1	Bench 2
C	Josh Hawley	Yariv Amiram	Willy Workman
PF	Braelee Albert	Ori Ovadia	Nadav Goffer
SF	Chen Guy	Alon Simmons	Yoav Scheller
SG	Davon Barnes	Omri Shelef	Joe Ragland
PG	Ron Cohen	Yahel Peleg	Eyal Sultan

- The Israeli league rule requires every team to have at least one Israeli on the court at any time.
- There should be maximum 5 foreigners on a 12-men game sheet.

=== Notable former players ===
- Set a club record or won an individual award as a professional player.
- Played at least one official international match for his senior national team at any time.

- (Israel) Dror Cohen
- (United States) Austin Price

== Games against NBA teams ==
1 October 2022

Boxscore

Maccabi Ra'anana (Israel)	81–121	(United States) Los Angeles Clippers
Scoring by quarter: 16–37, 14–28, 29–29, 22–27
Pts: Morse 20; Rebs: Workman 10; Asts: Sapir 5		Pts: Kennard 16; Rebs: Brown 13; Asts: Preston 10

Climate Pledge Arena, Seattle, WA
Attendance: 9,333
Referees: Tony Brothers, Kevin Cutler, John Butler

6 October 2022

Boxscore

Maccabi Ra'anana (Israel)	85–138	(United States) Portland Trail Blazers
Scoring by quarter: 22–39, 26–24, 23–41, 14–34
Pts: Cole 19; Rebs: Jones 9 Asts: Cole 6		Pts: Sharpe 27; Rebs: Walker 7 Asts: Johnson 11

Moda Center, Portland, OR
Attendance: 10,622
Referees: Marat Kogut, Karl Lane, J.T. Orr

9 October 2022

Boxscore

Maccabi Ra'anana (Israel)	97–144	(United States) Oklahoma City Thunder
Scoring by quarter: 29–33, 25–38, 23–48, 20–25
Pts: Siggers 40; Rebs: Workman 10; Asts: Cole 6		Pts: Omoruyi 25; Rebs: Omoruyi, Jay. Williams 12; Asts: Jal. Williams 13

Paycom Center, Oklahoma City, OK
Attendance: 18,203
Referees: Eric Dalen, Kevin Scott, Tyler Ricks

12 October 2023

Boxscore

Maccabi Ra'anana (Israel)	103–135	(United States) Brooklyn Nets
Scoring by quarter: 39–34, 21–40, 25–30, 18–31
Pts: Bacon, Weatherspoon 17; Rebs: Caboclo 7 Asts: Alber, Bacon 5		Pts: Bridges 23; Rebs: Bazley 14; Asts: Simmons 9

Barclays Center, Brooklyn, NY
Attendance: 12,346
Referees: David Guthrie, J.T. Orr, Cheryl Flores

16 October 2023

Boxscore

Maccabi Ra'anana (Israel)	89–120	(United States) Cleveland Cavaliers
Scoring by quarter: 19–31, 23–34, 27–31, 20–24
Pts: Diakite 17; Rebs: Caboclo 9 Asts: Weatherspoon 5		Pts: Bates 16; Rebs: Wade 8 Asts: Jerome, Porter Jr. 6

Rocket Mortgage FieldHouse, Cleveland, OH
Attendance: 13,377
Referees: Zach Zarba, Jason Goldenberg, Tyler Ricks

17 October 2023

Boxscore

Maccabi Ra'anana (Israel)	111–138	(United States) Minnesota Timberwolves
Scoring by quarter: 38–33, 22–39, 38–36, 13–30
Pts: Bacon 26; Rebs: Caboclo 9 Asts: Hagans 9		Pts: Garza 30; Rebs: Miller 15; Asts: Nix 10

Target Center, Minneapolis, MN
Attendance: 8,828
Referees: Scott Wall, Marc Davis, Pat Fraher
