= Anthony Jones (basketball, born 1967) =

American basketball player (born 1967)

Personal information
- Born: March 21, 1967 (age 59) Lawton, Oklahoma, U.S.
- Listed height: 6 ft 7 in (2.01 m)
- Listed weight: 200 lb (91 kg)

Career information
- High school: Lawton (Lawton, Oklahoma)
- College: Connors State (1986–1988); Union College (1989); Oral Roberts (1990–1991)
- NBA draft: 1991: 2nd round, 52nd overall pick
- Drafted by: Los Angeles Lakers
- Position: Small forward
- Stats at Basketball Reference

Anthony Jones (born March 21, 1967) is an American former basketball player. He attended Lawton High School in Lawton, Oklahoma, and played basketball for two seasons with the Connors State Cowboys. Jones attempted to transfer to Oklahoma State University but failed to graduate from Connors State and was academically ineligible. He instead played eight games with the Union College Bulldogs in 1989. Jones then transferred to play for the Oral Roberts Golden Eagles to play for head coach Ken Trickey, who had attempted to recruit Jones since high school. He sat out the 1989–90 season to concentrate on his academics and made his debut for the Golden Eagles during his senior season in 1990–91.

Jones was drafted by the Los Angeles Lakers as the 52nd overall pick of the 1991 NBA draft but never played in the National Basketball Association (NBA)
