= Josh Hawley (basketball) =

American basketball player (born 1996)

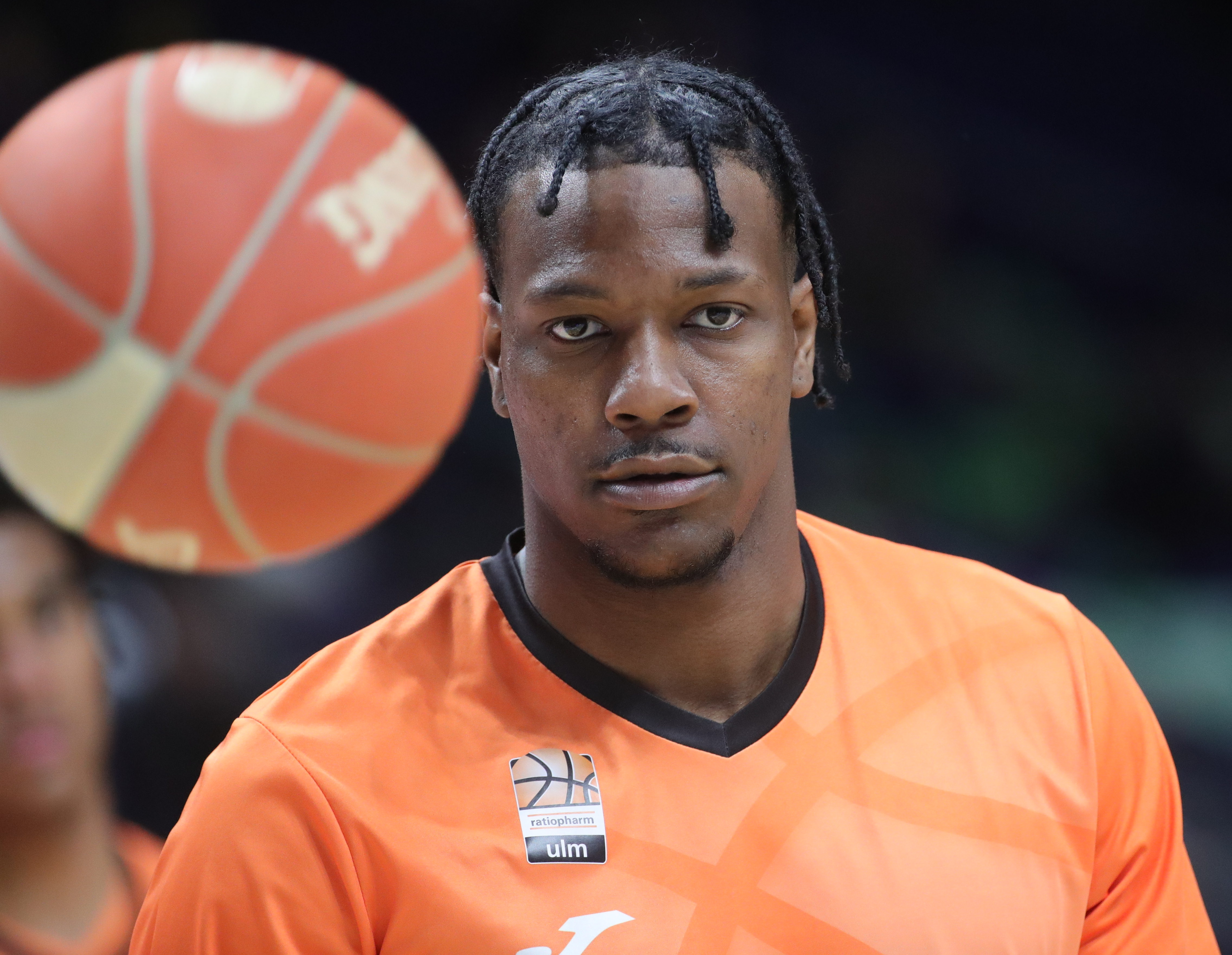
- Hawley in 2023 with Ratiopharm Ulm

No. 32 – Maccabi Ra'anana
- Position: Power forward / center
- League: Liga Leumit

Personal information
- Born: October 28, 1996 (age 30) Irving, Texas, U.S.
- Listed height: 6 ft 8 in (2.03 m)
- Listed weight: 210 lb (95 kg)

Career information
- High school: MacArthur (Irving, Texas)
- College: Tarleton State (2016–2020)
- NBA draft: 2020: undrafted
- Playing career: 2020–present

Career history
- 2020–2021: BC Vera
- 2021–2022: SCM U Craiova
- 2022–2023: Ratiopharm Ulm
- 2023: ADA Blois
- 2023–2025: Bnei Herzliya
- 2025–2026: Löwen Braunschweig
- 2026–present: Maccabi Ra'anana

Career highlights
- Lone Star Defensive Player of the Year (2020)

Joshua Daniel Hawley (born October 28, 1996) is an American professional basketball player for Maccabi Ra'anana of the Liga Leumit. He played college basketball for Tarleton State University, with whom he was named 2019 Lone Star Conference Defensive Player of the Year. Hawley plays as a power forward or a center.

== Early life ==
Hawley's parents are Kasey Mitchell and Gabriel Hawley, and he was born in Irving, Texas. He is 6 ft 7 in (2.01 m) tall, and weighs 210 pounds (95 kg).

== High school ==
Hawley attended MacArthur High School in Irving, graduating in 2015. Playing basketball for the school, in his senior year he averaged 18 points and 12 rebounds per game, and was named Irving Independent School District MVP, all-region, and first team all-state.

== College ==
Hawley attended Tarleton State University in Stephenville, Texas, majoring in Kinesiology. After redshirting for the 2015-16 season, the following season as a redshirt freshman he averaged 9.3 points, 5.0 rebounds, 1.2 steals, and 0.8 blocks per game for the Tarleton State Texans men's basketball team.

As a sophomore in 2017-18, Hawley averaged 13.7 points, 9.3 rebounds (3rd in the Lone Star Conference), 1.3 steals, and 2.0 blocks per game, while shooting 52% from the floor (leading the conference). He was named second team All-Lone Star Conference, and to the Lone Star Conference all-defensive team.

As a junior in 2018-19, he averaged 17.3 points, 9.9 rebounds (leading the conference), 1.2 assists, 1.9 steals, and 1.2 blocks per game, while shooting 57.6% from the floor. Hawley was named D2CCA first team All-Region, Lone Star Conference Defensive Player of the Year, and first team All-Lone Star Conference.

As a senior in 2019-20, Hawley was named the Lone Star Conference co-preseason Player of the Year and a Street & Smith preseason All-American. He averaged 14.8 points, 9.4 rebounds, 1.0 assists, 1.5 steals, and 0.9 blocks per game, while shooting 50.0% from the field. He was named to the Lone Star Conference All-Second Team. He closed out his Tarleton State career fourth all-time in scoring (1,578 points) and third all-time in rebounds (968), steals (168) and blocks (138).

== Professional career ==
=== BC Vera ===
In 2020-21 Hawley played for BC Vera in the Georgian Superliga. He averaged 15.0 points, 10.3 rebounds (3rd in the league), 1.6 assists, 2.0 steals (9th), and 0.9 blocks per game.

=== SCM CSU Craiova ===
In 2021-22 he played for SCM CSU Craiova in Romania in the Liga Națională. Hawley averaged 14.8 points, 7.7 rebounds (9th in the league), 1.3 assists, 2.1 steals (leading the league), and 0.2 blocks per game, while shooting 53.1% from the field. He was voted Eurobasket.com All-Romanian League Forward of the Year.

=== Ratiopharm Ulm ===
On August 3, 2022, Hawley signed with Ratiopharm Ulm in Germany in the Basketball Bundesliga. He played for the team in 2022-23. He averaged 8.0 points, 4.8 rebounds, 0.7 assists, 1.4 steals (8th in the league), and 0.5 blocks per game, while shooting 50.5% from the field.

=== ADA Blois Basket ===
In 2023-24 he played for ADA Blois Basket in France in LNB Élite. In 18 games in the Élite, Hawley averaged 9.1 points, 5.7 rebounds, 1.1 assists, 1.0 steals, and 0.3 blocks per game.

=== Bnei Herzliya Basket ===
On January 3, 2024, Hawley signed with Bnei Herzliya Basket in the Israeli Basketball Premier League. He plays forward and center for the team, and extended his contract in June 2024.

=== Basketball Löwen Braunschweig ===
On August 1, 2025, he signed with Löwen Braunschweig of the Basketball Bundesliga.
