= Ron Newsome =

American football coach (1943–2012)

Biographical details
- Born: September 15, 1943; Pittsburg, Texas
- Died: April 17, 2012 (aged 68); Stephenville, Texas
- Education: East Texas State

Coaching career (HC unless noted)
- 1972: East Texas State (assistant)
- 1973–1975: Western New Mexico
- 1983–1986: Tarleton State (DC)

Head coaching record
- Overall: 11–15

Ron James Newsome (September 15, 1943 – April 17, 2012) was an American football coach. He served as the head football coach at Western New Mexico University from 1973 to 1975 where he achieved a record of 11–15.

Prior to that, Newsome was an assistant coach for the East Texas State's 1972 NAIA championship team. He was the defensive coordinator at Tarleton State University from 1983 to 1986.

== Head coaching record ==
Year	Team	Overall	Conference	Standing	Bowl/playoffs
Western New Mexico Mustangs (Rocky Mountain Athletic Conference) (1973–1977)
1973	Western New Mexico	3–5	3–3	T–4th	
1974	Western New Mexico	4–5	2–4	T–6th	
1975	Western New Mexico	4–5	3–4	5th	
Western New Mexico:		11–15	8–11		
Total:		11–15			
