= Graford Independent School District =

School district in Texas

Address
- 400 W Division Graford, Palo Pinto County, Texas, 76449; United States

District information
- Type: Public, independent school district
- Grades: PK-12
- Superintendent: Brandon Perry
- Governing agency: Texas Education Agency, Region 11
- Budget: $12.4 million (2015-2016)
- NCES District ID: 4821330

Students and staff
- Students: 352 (2017-2018)
- Teachers: 31.87 (2017-2018)
- Staff: 55.51 (2017-2018)

Other information
- Website: www.grafordisd.net

Graford Independent School District is a public school district based in Graford, Texas, United States; it is located in north-central Palo Pinto County, with a small part extending into southern Jack County.

The district operates two campuses -

- Graford High School (grades 7–12)
- Graford Elementary School (prekindergarten-grade 6)

In 2009, the school district was rated "recognized" by the Texas Education Agency.

== History ==
The district changed to a four-day school week in fall 2022.

== Students ==
=== Academics ===
STAAR - At Approaches Grade Level or Above (Sum of All Grades Tested)
Subject	Graford ISD	Region 11	State of Texas
Reading/ELA	73%	77%	75%
Mathematics	75%	82%	82%
Writing	64%	70%	68%
Science	83%	83%	81%
Soc. Studies	78%	82%	81%
All Tests	75%	79%	78%

Students in Graford earn scores near local regional and statewide averages on standardized tests. In 2018-2019 State of Texas Assessments of Academic Readiness results, 75% of students in Graford ISD met Approaches Grade Level standards, compared with 79% in Region 11 and 78% in Texas. The average SAT score of students in 2017-18 was 1030, and the average ACT score was not available due to the small number of students taking the test.

=== Demographics ===
In the 2018–2019 school year, the school district had a total of 347 students, ranging from prekindergarten through grade 12. The class of 2018 included 18 graduates; the annual drop-out rate across grades 9-12 was reported as 1.0%.

As of the 2018–2019 school year, the ethnic distribution of the school district was 84.4% White, 13.0% Hispanic, 0.3% Asian, and 2.3% from two or more races. (No African American, American Indian, or Pacific Islander students were reported.) Economically disadvantaged students made up 58.8% of the student body.
