= Billy Gillispie =

American college basketball coach (born 1959)

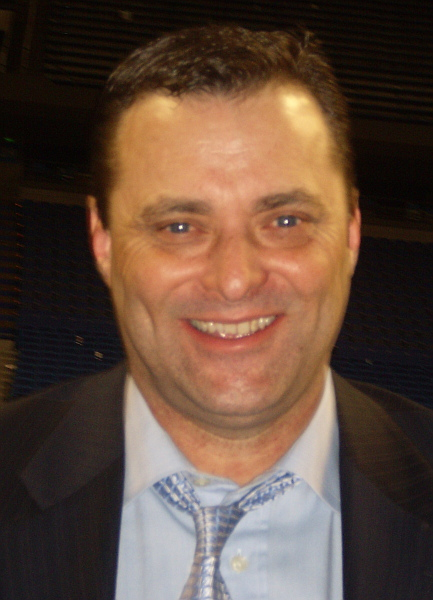
- Gillispie in 2008

Biographical details
- Born: November 7, 1959 (age 66); Abilene, Texas, U.S.
- Education: Southwest Texas State

Playing career
- 1978–1980: Ranger JC

Coaching career (HC unless noted)
- 1982–1985: Texas State (assistant)
- 1985–1987: Killeen HS (assistant)
- 1987–1988: Copperas Cove HS
- 1988–1990: Canyon HS
- 1990–1993: Ellison HS
- 1993–1994: South Plains JC (assistant)
- 1994–1997: Baylor (assistant)
- 1997–2000: Tulsa (assistant)
- 2000–2002: Illinois (assistant)
- 2002–2004: UTEP
- 2004–2007: Texas A&M
- 2007–2009: Kentucky
- 2011–2012: Texas Tech
- 2015–2020: Ranger College
- 2020–2026: Tarleton State

Head coaching record
- Overall: 240–200 (.545) (college)
- Tournaments: 3–4 (NCAA Division I); 4–2 (NIT); 0–1 (CBI); 2-1 (CIT)

Accomplishments and honors

Championships
- WAC regular season (2004)

Awards
- 2× Big 12 Coach of the Year (2005, 2007); SEC co-Coach of the Year (2008)

Billy Clyde Gillispie (/ɡɪˈlɪspi/ ghih-LIS-pee; born November 7, 1959), also known by his initials BCG and Billy Clyde, is an American college basketball who was most recently the men's basketball coach at Tarleton State. Gillispie has previously been head coach at UTEP, Texas A&M, Kentucky, and Texas Tech.

After leading both UTEP and Texas A&M to postseason appearances one year after poor seasons, Gillispie became the only college basketball coach to be in charge of the National Collegiate Athletic Association (NCAA) program with the biggest turnaround in two consecutive seasons. Gillispie was known as an excellent recruiter who managed to put together four straight top-25 recruiting classes. In his three seasons at Texas A&M, the Aggies achieved three consecutive 20-win seasons for the first time in the program's history.

== Early years ==
Gillispie was born November 7, 1959, in Abilene, Texas, the middle child and only boy among five children of Clyde, a cattle truck driver, and Winifred Gillispie. He grew up in Graford, Texas, a town of 494 people located about 65 miles west of Fort Worth. As a child, Gillispie worked as a paperboy, delivering copies of The Fort Worth Press. At Graford High School, Gillispie played point guard for the basketball team and was a standout athlete in his graduating class of 20 students. He attended Ranger College, playing basketball and baseball for them from 1978 to 1980, before transferring to Sam Houston State University to work as a student assistant for their basketball team under coach Bob Derryberry, a former classmate of Gillispie's father. Derryberry moved to Southwest Texas State University (now Texas State University–San Marcos) the following year, and Gillispie accompanied him, spending three years as a graduate assistant. Gillispie received his degree in education from Southwest Texas State in 1983.

== Coaching career ==
=== Early positions ===
Gillispie spent the next few years building a coaching resume, spending two years as an assistant high school basketball coach before becoming a head coach at Copperas Cove High School in 1987. From 1987 to 1993, Gillispie held three high school head coaching positions. He was nominated for Texas Association of Basketball Coaches (TABC) high school coach of the year for his 1992–1993 season with Ellison High School in Killeen, Texas, which set school records for winning percentage and points scored and ended the season ranked 4th in the state.

After a year as an assistant coach at South Plains College, in 1994, Gillispie moved to Division I college basketball as an assistant coach and recruiting coordinator at Baylor University under head coach Harry Miller. Miller and Gillispie had coached against each other in the same high school district as late as two years earlier, with Miller at Temple High School. The Baylor Bears' 1996 recruiting class was ranked as high as number six in the nation. After three years at Baylor, Gillispie moved to the University of Tulsa to be an assistant coach under Bill Self. Tulsa reached the elite 8 in the 2000 season. When Self moved to the University of Illinois at Urbana–Champaign, Gillispie followed, working as an assistant there for the next two years. During those two seasons, Fighting Illini won back-to-back Big Ten Conference titles for the first time in 50 years, advancing to the Elite Eight in the 2001 NCAA Tournament and to the Sweet 16 in the 2002 NCAA Tournament. With Gillispie's assistance, Illinois landed a top 10 recruiting class in 2002.

Through Gillispie's eight years as an assistant, he was a member of coaching staffs that won five conference championships in six years. As part of Bill Self's staff, he was a member of the only coaching staff in NCAA history to lead two different schools to the Elite Eight in successive seasons.

=== UTEP ===
Gillispie was hired as the head coach of the men's basketball team at the University of Texas at El Paso (UTEP) in 2002.

==== 2002–2003 ====
In his first season as a head coach, the UTEP Miners finished a dismal 6–24. Despite the poor showing, Gillispie put his recruiting expertise to work so that his first recruiting class ranked in the top 25 in the country and included Filiberto Rivera, the 2003 National Junior College Player of the Year, and Omar Thomas, the all-time leading scorer in junior college basketball.

==== 2003–2004 ====
In the exhibition games preceding the 2003–04 season, Gillispie's UTEP Miners defeated the Harlem Globetrotters 89–88, after the Globetrotters had already defeated many college teams including the then-defending national champion, Syracuse Orange. It was the first defeat the Harlem Globetrotters had suffered in 289 games.

Although the Miners were predicted to finish ninth in the Western Athletic Conference (WAC) for the 2003–04 season, UTEP instead captured their first conference title in 12 years. The team finished 24–8 and received a bid to the 2004 NCAA tournament. The 18-win improvement was the best in Division I basketball that season, and one of the best in Division I history. As a result of their success, the Miners built a huge home following, ranking first in the NCAA in increased attendance. After his second season with the Miners, Gillispie was named Texas coach of the Year by the TABC and was a finalist for National Coach of the Year honors.

=== Texas A&M ===
After two years at UTEP, Gillispie was approached to interview for the head coach position at Texas A&M University, vacant after the forced resignation of Melvin Watkins, whose team had gone 7–21 and failed to win a Big 12 Conference game in the 2003–04 season. Athletic Director Bill Byrne needed to revitalize the program, which had only one winning season in the previous eleven years, and desired a new head coach with the ability to "recruit the heck out of Texas". Gillispie agreed to take the job only after he was sure that the predominantly football-focused school was actually committed to winning, becoming the first native Texan to be the head basketball coach at Texas A&M since J. B. Reid was hired in 1930.

==== 2004–2005 ====
Gillispie asked for a budget large enough to allow them to play confidence-building non-conference schedules, rarely venturing out of Reed Arena in the first two seasons. Using the padded non-conference schedule to their advantage, the Aggies won the first eleven games of Gillispie's debut season before finishing the season 21–10, a fourteen-game improvement over the previous season. Although the Aggies were picked to finish last in the Big 12 Conference, they finished 8–8 in conference play, winning games against the number 9 Texas Longhorns and number 25 Texas Tech Red Raiders on their way to becoming only the third college team to ever finish .500 in league play after being winless the previous season. For the first time in eleven years, the team received a postseason bid. The Aggies' two wins in the National Invitation Tournament (NIT) were their first postseason wins in 23 seasons. With the best first-season record of any head basketball coach in Texas A&M history, the Aggies had the most season wins since the 1979–80 team had won 26 games. The Aggies were named the country's most improved team, making Gillispie the only coach in history to lead the most improved team in consecutive seasons. As a result of his success, he was the consensus selection for Big 12 Conference Coach of the Year. and was selected to serve as a court coach at the 2005 USA Men's World University Games Team Trials.

==== 2005–2006 ====
Although the Aggies lost Antoine Wright to the NBA draft following the 2004–05 season, the team did not suffer the predicted drop-off, and actually broke a streak of twenty-five years without being ranked in the poll. The Aggies finished the regular season with a 21–8 record, including a 10–6 conference record and a fourth-place finish in the Big 12, the best finish and most wins for Texas A&M since the formation of the conference in 1996. For the first time since 1987, Texas A&M received a bid to the NCAA tournament. As a twelfth-seeded team, the Aggies upset the Big East Conference champion Syracuse Orange in the first round of the tournament but then lost in the second round to eventual Final Four participant, the LSU Tigers, by the score of 58–57 on a three-pointer that LSU made in the final seconds of the game. Following the season, Gillispie was named the Big 12 Conference Coach of the Year by several major newspapers and was named the Texas College Coach of the Year by the TABC.

==== 2006–2007 ====
The Aggies began the 2006–07 season deemed capable of contending with the Kansas Jayhawks for the Big 12 Conference regular-season crown and were picked to finish second in the Big 12 media and coaches' polls. In their twelfth attempt, on February 3, 2007, Texas A&M became the first Big 12 Conference team in the South Division to beat the Jayhawks at Allen Fieldhouse, moving them into sole possession of first place in the conference standing. Less than forty-eight hours later the Aggies defeated their archrivals, the #25 ranked Texas Longhorns, marking their 21st straight win at home.

The 2006–07 Aggies ended the regular season ranked #7 by the Associated Press and #6 in the ESPN/USA Today Coaches' poll. The Aggies set a school record for most consecutive weeks in the top 25, reaching a school high number 6 ranking. On March 4, 2007, Gillispie was awarded his second Big 12 Conference Coach of the Year award for leading the Aggies to a 13–3 conference record and a second-place finish behind the Kansas Jayhawks. The 2006–07 post-season, the Aggies advanced to the Sweet Sixteen in the NCAA tourney. Their post-season hopes ended with a one-point loss (65–64) to the Memphis Tigers at the Alamodome in San Antonio on March 22, 2007.

=== Kentucky ===
==== Hiring ====
On April 5, 2007, University of Kentucky athletic director Mitch Barnhart was given permission by Texas A&M to speak with Gillispie about the program's basketball coach opening, vacated by Tubby Smith.

On April 6, 2007, the announcement was made that Gillispie had accepted the position. He drew criticism for the way he left Texas A&M by having alerted the Aggie players of his decision to take the Kentucky job via text message, while en route to the introductory press conference in Lexington.

On April 6, 2007, Gillispie was formally announced as the new head coach of the University of Kentucky by UK athletic director Mitch Barnhart. He fielded questions from the media during a press conference held at UK's new practice facility, the Joe Craft Center. He expressed his excitement and joy to have been given the honor and the opportunity to coach what former Kentucky Wildcats head coach Rick Pitino referred to as the "Roman Empire" of college basketball. "I'm very, very grateful and honored to be here, but we have a lot of work to do." Gillispie became only the sixth head coach in the last 76 years at the school.

Gillispie signed a Memorandum of Understanding with Kentucky on April 6, 2007 which outlined his salary and benefits. The memo also stated that contract negotiations would be concluded with "every reasonable effort" within 60 days. Gillispie and the university never signed a formal contract.

==== Recruiting ====
Between April 29 and May 7, 2008, Billy Gillispie made recruiting waves by snagging commitments from five players spread over five different classes, most notably the commitment on May 1 of Thousand Oaks, California 8th-grader Michael Avery. Avery, a member of the class of 2012, gave the University of Kentucky its earliest basketball commitment in the history of the program. The commitment also earned national scrutiny for Coach Gillispie and the university, but there were no violations of the NCAA recruiting rules. During his tenure at Kentucky, Gillispie snagged numerous high-profile recruits. These included three 5-star recruits according to Scout.com (Patrick Patterson, Daniel Orton & Dominique Ferguson) and five 4-star recruits (Alex Legion, DeAndre Liggins, Darius Miller, Kevin Galloway and Jon Hood). Legion later transferred to Illinois early in the 2007–08 season.

==== 2007–2008 ====
Wildcat fans packed Rupp Arena for Big Blue Madness (the first practice of the season and the program's major publicity event) to catch a glimpse of their new coach in action. In his first few months he signed two high-profile recruits, Patrick Patterson and Alex Legion. Patterson had previously been recruited by the Duke Blue Devils, Florida Gators, and Kentucky Wildcats (by former coach Tubby Smith) before signing with Gillispie. Alex Legion would transfer 6 games into his first season at Kentucky. Gillispie's first season got off to a rocky start, being routed 84–68 by unranked Gardner Webb in Rupp Arena in the second game of the season. This loss dropped the Wildcats from the AP Top 25 poll, where they did not return for the remainder of the season. The Wildcats improved their record during conference play, achieving a 12–4 record and on March 11, Gillispie was named Co-Southeastern Conference coach of the year along with Bruce Pearl of the Tennessee Volunteers.

==== 2008–2009 ====
On November 14, 2008, Gillispie's Kentucky team opened the 2008–09 season with another loss at home, this time to the Virginia Military Institute (VMI) Keydets, by a score of 111–103. However, on November 30, 2008, Gillispie led Kentucky to a 54–43 come from behind victory over the West Virginia Mountaineers to win the Findlay Toyota Las Vegas Invitational championship. Although his Wildcats had trailed for the entire game, Billy made halftime adjustments that stymied coach Bobby Huggins' Mountaineers, eventually allowing Kentucky to overcome a 14-point deficit well into the second half – holding the Mountaineers to only 17-second-half points. Although neither team was ranked, the win was considered an upset victory for Coach Gillispie and his Wildcats after the VMI loss and was the first in-season tournament championship win for the University of Kentucky since winning the Great Alaska Shootout in late 1996.

After a 5–0 start in the SEC conference schedule, however, Gillispie's team dropped three straight games to the Ole Miss Rebels, South Carolina Gamecocks and Mississippi State Bulldogs, with the latter two losses coming at home. Some Kentucky fans vociferously booed Gillispie during the Mississippi State game. Kentucky rebounded against the Florida Gators with a 68–65 victory at home. Jodie Meeks hit a contested fade-away three-pointer with less than 5 seconds left to give Kentucky the lead. Nick Calathes had an opportunity to tie the game after being fouled with 0.6 seconds left by Kevin Galloway, but missed all three free throws (the last intentional) to seal the Wildcats' win.

Kentucky also had two lopsided victories over SEC East regular season champion Tennessee. Although Gillispie continued to take the blame for the Wildcats' woes, he was also a victim of some of his youthful and inexperienced recruits' underperformance and the lack of consistent play at the point guard position. Gillispie continued to publicly encourage his players and praise their work ethic despite the team's inconsistent play during the 2008–09 season. Such encouragement manifested itself in Gillispie's public statements about his players after close losses.

Kentucky missed the NCAA Tournament for the first time since 1991, and received a 4th seed in the NIT, defeating UNLV and Creighton in the opening and second rounds before losing to the Notre Dame Fighting Irish in the quarterfinals. Kentucky finished the year with an 8–8 record in conference and 22–14 overall. The record tied for the second-most losses ever in the program's history.

==== Firing ====
Gillispie was fired as the Wildcats' head coach on March 27, 2009. Athletic director Mitch Barnhart told Gillispie that his firing was not related to on-court performance, but was due to a general feeling that Gillispie was "not a good fit" for UK. According to Barnhart, the "incompatibility" between Gillispie and UK specifically manifested itself in Gillispie's failure to sign a formal contract two years after his hiring. As mentioned above, Gillispie had coached for two years on a "Memorandum of Understanding," not a contract; UK initially considered it the equivalent of a series of one-year contracts. UK had offered Gillispie a seven-year contract, but Gillispie had never signed it.

==== Lawsuit and settlement ====
On May 27, 2009, Gillispie filed a lawsuit against the University of Kentucky Athletic Association for breach of contract and fraud stemming from the firing. The suit was filed in Gillispie's home state of Texas, in the United States District Court for the Northern District of Texas. Gillispie was seeking $6 million, the amount he claimed the university owed him on the remaining years on the deal, punitive damages, attorney fees, and a jury trial. The next day, the university filed a countersuit against Gillispie in Franklin Circuit Court in Frankfort, Kentucky's state capital. In the countersuit, UK sought a judge's order that Gillispie's memorandum of understanding was not a formal contract.

On October 13, 2009, UK and Gillispie agreed to settle the dispute. Under the agreement, Gillispie got $2.98 million while UK paid over $265,000 in mediation costs.

=== Texas Tech ===
On March 20, 2011, Gillispie was named the 14th head coach of the Texas Tech Red Raiders. Gillispie replaced Pat Knight after Knight failed to make the NCAA tournament and compiled a 16–42 Big 12 Conference record over his three and a half seasons as head coach. Gillispie was introduced at a press conference on March 23, 2011, at the United Spirit Arena. On February 11, 2012, Gillispie won his first Big 12 game as the coach of the Red Raiders, who beat the Oklahoma Sooners, 65–47. He finished the 2011 season 8–23.

In October 2011, Gillispie exceeded the 20-hour practice limit set by the NCAA. Both Gillispie and assistant coach Bubba Jennings were reprimanded by Texas Tech in January 2012. The secondary violation was reported to the NCAA, and the organization approved the self-imposed penalty of a 12-hour, 20-minute reduction in practice time. The violation was not reported to the public until September 2012, when allegations of misconduct surfaced in the media.

==== Allegations of player mistreatment ====
Before the start of the 2012–13 basketball season, allegations surfaced from former and current players accusing Gillispie of mistreatment. Fifteen players departed prematurely in the year after Gillispie arrived, a very high number for a college basketball program in a major conference. Also leaving were two strength coaches and two directors of basketball operations; some 30 persons overall. The allegations include forcing injured players to practice, keeping players Ty Nurse and Dejan Kravic in doubt about their scholarship status, and reneging on promises to potential new coaching staff hires. Shortly after the allegations were initially reported and he was due to meet with athletic director Kirby Hocutt about the allegations, Gillispie was hospitalized for six days with heart-attack like symptoms and high blood pressure after calling EMS. He left the hospital on September 6. Another call to EMS was made September 10, but did not require hospitalization. On September 11, Gillispie took an indefinite medical leave, and checked himself into the Mayo Clinic. He was treated there for 'kidney problems' and 'abnormal headaches', and told to live in a stress-free environment for 30 days. Assistant head coach Chris Walker took over the day-to-day operations of the basketball team.

==== Departure ====
On September 20, 2012, Gillispie resigned as head coach at Texas Tech, citing health concerns. His contract was honored through the end of the 2012 calendar year. Walker was named interim coach for the 2012–13 season.

=== Ranger College ===
In April 2015, it was announced that Gillispie would become the new basketball coach and athletic director at Ranger College, a junior college and his alma mater.

After using ineligible players and other violations, his 2015–16 Ranger College men's basketball team forfeited all games from that season and were placed on probation by the NJCAA for the 2016 – 2017 season. On December 7, 2016, Gillispie announced his immediate retirement from coaching, citing severe health issues related to his blood pressure. In May 2017, however, Gillispie returned to the sidelines at Ranger.

=== Tarleton State ===
On March 30, 2020, Gillispie was named the head coach at Tarleton State, and guided the team during its transition from Division II to Division I in the Western Athletic Conference.

== Personal life ==
Gillispie was married to the former Misty Meyer from 1985 until their divorce in 1993.

A February 11, 2007, The Dallas Morning News article described Gillispie as a self-professed workaholic during his time at Texas A&M. Despite the fact that he had three assistants who watched opponents' game film and summarized it for him, he sometimes watched as many as fifteen of an opponent's games, often working as late as 2 or 3 a.m. to ensure he had adequate time to devote to the task. He stated that his eight-year marriage ended because he could not find a balance between work and home. With the sheer number of hours he spent working, Gillispie often did not have time to even shop for groceries, once going as long as six months without any food in his refrigerator.

On August 27, 2009, Gillispie was arrested at 2:45 am in Lawrenceburg, Kentucky for driving under the influence. A passenger in the 2009 Mercedes Benz C300, Charles O'Connor, was arrested and charged with alcohol intoxication. According to the police report, an officer saw the vehicle swerving and stopped the driver. The officers who were at the scene smelled a strong odor of alcohol, describing Gillispie's eyes as being red and glassy, with his speech slurred. When asked about his proof of insurance, Gillispie stated that it was in a golf bag in his trunk. He then refused a blood test and a breathalyzer on the scene and was subsequently arrested and taken to the Franklin County jail. Gillispie pleaded not guilty. A judge had scheduled a trial for February 10, 2010, in the case. However, on November 2, 2009, Gillispie changed his plea to guilty under a plea agreement. He was fined $1,028 and must complete an alcohol and drug education course before his Kentucky driver's license can be renewed. He has had two prior DUI arrests, the first in 1999 when he was arrested for driving while intoxicated and improper use of a lane in Tulsa, Oklahoma. He eventually pleaded guilty to a lesser charge of reckless driving. He was arrested again in 2003 in his first year at the University of Texas at El Paso on suspicion of drunken driving, although it was later dismissed based on a lack of evidence.

In September 2009, it was reported that Gillispie had entered an alcohol rehabilitation program and had checked himself into the John Lucas After Care Program in Houston.

== Head coaching record ==
=== College ===
Record table
Season	Team	Overall	Conference	Standing	Postseason
UTEP Miners (Western Athletic Conference) (2002–2004)
2002–03	UTEP	6–24	3–15	10th	
2003–04	UTEP	24–8	13–5	T–1st	NCAA Division I First Round
UTEP:		30–32 (.484)	16–20 (.444)		
Texas A&M Aggies (Big 12 Conference) (2004–2007)
2004–05	Texas A&M	21–10	8–8	7th	NIT Quarterfinal
2005–06	Texas A&M	22–9	10–6	4th	NCAA Division I Second Round
2006–07	Texas A&M	27–7	13–3	2nd	NCAA Division I Sweet 16
Texas A&M:		70–26 (.729)	31–17 (.646)		
Kentucky Wildcats (Southeastern Conference) (2007–2009)
2007–08	Kentucky	18–13	12–4	2nd (East)	NCAA Division I First Round
2008–09	Kentucky	22–14	8–8	4th (East)	NIT Quarterfinal
Kentucky:		40–27 (.597)	20–12 (.625)		
Texas Tech Red Raiders (Big 12 Conference) (2011–2012)
2011–12	Texas Tech	8–23	1–17	10th	
Texas Tech:		8–23 (.258)	1–17 (.056)		
Tarleton State Texans (Western Athletic Conference) (2020–present)
2020–21	Tarleton State	10–10	5–7	6th	
2021–22	Tarleton State	14–17	9–9	8th	
2022–23	Tarleton State	17–17	9–9	7th	CBI First Round
2023–24	Tarleton State	25–10	16–4	2nd	CIT Semifinals
2024–25	Tarleton State	12–20	7–9	6th	
2025–26	Tarleton State	14–18	5–13	T–6th	
Tarleton State:		92–92 (.500)	51–51 (.500)		
Total:		240–200 (.545)			
National champion Postseason invitational champion Conference regular season champion Conference regular season and conference tournament champion Division regular season champion Division regular season and conference tournament champion Conference tournament champion

=== Junior college ===
Record table
Season	Team	Overall	Conference	Standing	Postseason
Ranger Rangers (NJCAA Region 5) (2015–present)
2015–16	Ranger	0–38*	0–12	4th*	vacated
2016–17	Ranger	22–8	7–5		
2017–18	Ranger	22–9	7–5		
2018–19	Ranger	31–4	13–1	1st	NJCAA runner-up
2019–20	Ranger	28–3	13–1	1st	
Ranger:		103–62 (.624)	40–24 (.625)		
Total:		103–62 (.624)			
National champion Postseason invitational champion Conference regular season champion Conference regular season and conference tournament champion Division regular season champion Division regular season and conference tournament champion Conference tournament champion

- *31 wins forfeited for 2015–2016. They do count as losses; on court record was 31–7.
