= Tarleton State Texans men's basketball =

Men's basketball team of Tarleton State University

Tarleton State Texans
2026–27 Tarleton State Texans men's basketball team
- University: Tarleton State University
- First season: 1961
- Head coach: Eric Haut (1st season)
- Location: Stephenville, Texas
- Arena: EECU Center (capacity: 8,000)
- Conference: Western Athletic Conference
- Nickname: Texans
- Colors: Purple and white
Other NCAA Division I tournament results

NCAA Division II tournament Final Four
- 2005, 2015

NCAA Division II tournament Elite Eight
- 2005, 2006, 2015, 2016

NCAA Division II tournament Sweet Sixteen
- 2003, 2005, 2006, 2008, 2015, 2016

NCAA Division II tournament appearances
- 2002, 2003, 2004, 2005, 2006, 2008, 2010, 2011, 2012, 2013, 2014, 2015, 2016, 2017

Conference tournament champions
- Lone Star: 2004, 2013, 2014

Conference regular-season champions
- TIAA; 1984, 1989, 1990, 1991 Lone Star; 2004, 2012, 2014, 2015

Conference division champions
- LSC North: 2004; LSC South: 2002, 2006, 2011

The Tarleton State Texans men's basketball team, also known as the Tarleton Texans, represents Tarleton State University, located in Stephenville, Texas, in NCAA Division I as a member of the Western Athletic Conference (WAC). Through the 2019–20 season, the team competed in NCAA Division II as a member of the Lone Star Conference.

In 2019–20, a year after being named Lone Star Conference Defensive Player of the Year and first team All-Lone Star Conference, senior Josh Hawley was named the Lone Star Conference co-preseason Player of the Year and a Street & Smith preseason All-American. He closed out his Tarleton State career fourth all-time in scoring (1,578 points) and third all-time in rebounds (968), steals (168), and blocks (138).

The Texans made their Division I debut under first-year head coach Billy Gillispie for the 2020–21 season.

Through the 2024–25 season, the team played home games at Wisdom Gym on its campus in Stephenville. In the 2025–26 season, the team moved to the new EECU Center, having played its final home game in Wisdom Gym on March 8, 2025. In the same game, played Freddy Hicks became the first player for the team to score 1,000 points in the Division I era.

== Postseason results ==
=== CBI results ===
Tarleton State has appeared in one College Basketball Invitational (CBI). Their record is 0–1.

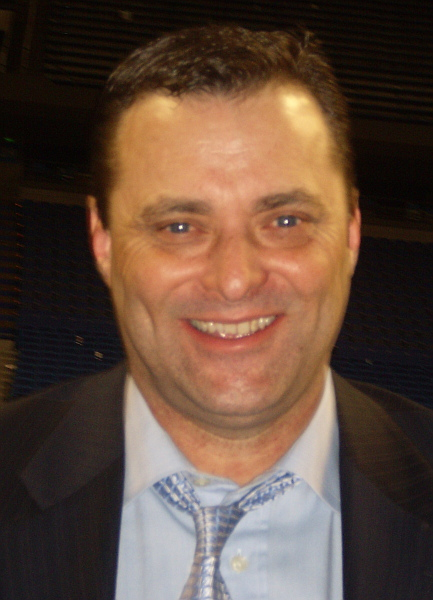
Coach Billy Gillispie

Year	Round	Opponent	Result
2023	First Round	Radford	L 70–72^{OT}

=== CIT results ===
The Texans have appeared in one CollegeInsider.com Postseason Tournament (CIT). Their combined record is 2–1.

Year	Round	Opponent	Result
2024	First Round; Quarterfinals; Semifinals	Texas Southern; Abilene Christian; Purdue Fort Wayne	W 82–71; W 86–59; L 72–73

=== NCAA Division II tournament results ===
The Texans have appeared in fourteen NCAA Division II Tournaments. Their combined record is 22–14.

Year	Round	Opponent	Result
2002	First Round	Incarnate Word	L 59–72
2003	First Round; Second Round; Regional Final	St. Mary's (TX); Northwest Missouri State; Northeastern State	W 65–43; W 73–58; L 46–48
2004	First Round; Second Round	Texas A&M–Kingsville; Drury	W 77–74; L 73–78^{OT}
2005	First Round; Second Round; Regional Final; Elite Eight; Final Four	Central Missouri; Pittsburg State; Texas A&M–Commerce; Cal Poly Pomona; Bryant	W 75–72; W 69–59^{OT} W 75–70; W 58–56; L 55–60
2006	First Round; Second Round; Regional Final; Elite Eight	Central Oklahoma; Central Missouri; Northwest Missouri State; Stonehill	W 75–68; W 62–59; W 72–71; L 59–69
2008	First Round; Second Round; Regional Final	St. Mary's (TX); Southwest Baptist; Central Oklahoma	W 70–62; W 80–72; L 76–77
2010	First Round; Second Round	Nebraska–Omaha; Midwestern State	W 75–71; L 56–71
2011	First Round	Midwestern State	L 51–64
2012	First Round; Second Round	Missouri Southern; Arkansas Tech	W 69–52; L 63–64^{OT}
2013	First Round	Metro State	L 65–76
2014	First Round; Second Round	Texas A&M International; Midwestern State	W 92–56; L 68–74
2015	First Round; Second Round; Regional Final; Elite Eight; Final Four	St. Mary's; Colorado–Colorado Springs; Angelo State; Mount Olive; Indiana (PA)	W 71–52; W 84–62; W 66–64; W 77–59; L 68–72
2016	First Round; Second Round; Regional Final; Elite Eight	Colorado Mines; Lubbock Christian; Angelo State; Augustana (SD)	W 83–61; W 69–63; W 77–72; L 79–86
2017	First Round	Fort Lewis	L 90–94^{OT}

== Notable players ==
- Josh Hawley (born 1996), Israeli Basketball Premier League player
- Corin Henry (born 1988), player for Sabah BC
- Jason Hooten (born 1969), head coach of the New Mexico State University men's basketball program
- A'Darius Pegues (born 1988), last played for Patriots BBC
- Harley Redin (1919–2020), was a basketball head coach for Wayland Baptist University
- Chris Reisman (born 1978), was most recently the head coach of the Tarleton State Texans men's basketball team
