= List of Central Missouri Mules basketball seasons =

This is a list of seasons completed by the Central Missouri Mules basketball team.

Note that Central Missouri uses the nickname "Mules" exclusively for men's sports. Women's athletes and teams are known as "Jennies".

Statistics overview
Season	Coach	Overall	Conference	Standing	Postseason
Joe Ferguson (Missouri Intercollegiate Athletic Association) (1905–1907)
1905–06	Joe Ferguson	0–1			
1906–07	Joe Ferguson	7–8			
Joe Ferguson:		7–9			
Guy Lowman (Missouri Intercollegiate Athletic Association) (1907–1908)
1907–08	Guy Lowman	0–1			
Guy Lowman:		0–1			
A. A. Mason (Missouri Intercollegiate Athletic Association) (1908–1910)
1908–09	A. A. Mason	10–4			
1909–10	A. A. Mason	6–6			
A. A. Mason:		16–10			
Frank J. Mason (Missouri Intercollegiate Athletic Association) (1910–1912)
1910–11	Frank J. Mason	4–3			
1911–12	Frank J. Mason	5–8			
Frank J. Mason:		9–11			
Forrest C. "Phog" Allen (Missouri Intercollegiate Athletic Association) (1912–1919)
1912–13	Phog Allen	11–7	6–0	1st	
1913–14	Phog Allen	15–4	9–1	1st	
1914–15	Phog Allen	13–4			
1915–16	Phog Allen	9–4			
1916–17	Phog Allen	13–2			
1917–18	Phog Allen	9–4			
1918–19	Phog Allen	14–6			
Phog Allen:		84–31	15–1		
Willard N. Greim (Missouri Intercollegiate Athletic Association) (1919–1923)
1919–20	Willard N. Greim	17–2			
1920–21	Willard N. Greim	22–2			
1921–22	Willard N. Greim	14–6			
1922–23	Willard N. Greim	15–11			
Willard N. Greim:		58–21	10–0		
Tad Reid (Missouri Intercollegiate Athletic Association) (1923–1938)
1923–24	Tad Reid	19–7			
1924–25	Tad Reid	14–7	7–1		
1925–26	Tad Reid	6–12	2–6		
1926–27	Tad Reid	8–7	7–5		
1928–29	Tad Reid	11–8	9–7		
1929–30	Tad Reid	13–7	10–6		
1930–31	Tad Reid	9–7	6–2		
1931–32	Tad Reid	1–13	0–8		
1932–33	Tad Reid	10–8	4–4		
1933–34	Tad Reid	9–8	2–6		
1934–35	Tad Reid	13–6	5–3		
1935–36	Tad Reid	19–4	8–2		
1936–37	Tad Reid	17–2	9–1		
1937–38	Tad Reid	17–3	10–0		
Tad Reid:		178–110	76–57		
Tom Scott (Missouri Intercollegiate Athletic Association) (1938–1942)
1938–39	Tom Scott	22–7	9–1		
1939–40	Tom Scott	17–8	7–3		
1940–41	Tom Scott	17–9	8–2		
1941–42	Tom Scott	19–7	10–0		
Tom Scott:		79–45	35–15		
Clarence Whiteman (Missouri Intercollegiate Athletic Association) (1942–1943)
1942–43	Clarence Whiteman	4–14	1–9		
Clarence Whiteman:		4–14	1–9		
Robert White (Missouri Intercollegiate Athletic Association) (1942–1943)
1943–44	Robert White	13–2			
1944–45	Robert White	7–11			
Robert White:		20–13			
Tom Scott (Missouri Intercollegiate Athletic Association) (1945–1946)
1945–46	Tom Scott	13–7	7–3		
Tom Scott:		13–7	7–3		
Earl Keth (Missouri Intercollegiate Athletic Association) (1946–1961)
1946–47	Earl Keth	8–15	3–6		
1947–48	Earl Keth	14–11	6–4		
1948–49	Earl Keth	16–9	7–3		
1949–50	Earl Keth	14–12	7–3		
1950–51	Earl Keth	18–7	8–2		
1951–52	Earl Keth	12–8	7–3		
1952–53	Earl Keth	7–14	5–5		
1953–54	Earl Keth	11–8	5–5		
1954–55	Earl Keth	7–13	5–5		
1955–56	Earl Keth	9–11	7–3		
1956–57	Earl Keth	9–11	8–2		
1957–58	Earl Keth	9–10	5–5		
1958–59	Earl Keth	5–17	4–6		
1959–60	Earl Keth	5–17	2–8		
1960–61	Earl Keth	13–7	5–5		
Earl Keth:		159–167	84–65		
Gene Bartow (Missouri Intercollegiate Athletic Association) (1961–1964)
1961–62	Gene Bartow	16–6	7–3		
1962–63	Gene Bartow	17–6	7–3		
1963–64	Gene Bartow	14–9	6–4		
Gene Bartow:		47–21	20–10		
Joe B. Hall (Missouri Intercollegiate Athletic Association) (1964–1965)
1964–65	Joe B. Hall	19–6	9–1		
Joe B. Hall:		19–6	9–1		
Chuck Smith (Missouri Intercollegiate Athletic Association) (1965–1966)
1965–66	Chuck Smith	14–8	7–3		
Chuck Smith:		14–8	7–3		
Norm Short (Missouri Intercollegiate Athletic Association) (1966–1972)
1966–67	Norm Short	12–14	4–8		
1967–68	Norm Short	10–13	4–6		
1968–69	Norm Short	14–9	8–2		
1969–70	Norm Short	19–6	8–2		
1970–71	Norm Short	12–11	8–4		
1971–72	Norm Short	7–19	1–11		
Norm Short:		74–69	7–3		
Jim Kampen (Missouri Intercollegiate Athletic Association) (1972–1975)
1972–73	Jim Kampen	12–14	7–5		
1973–74	Jim Kampen	10–16	4–8		
1974–75	Jim Kampen	10–16	5–7		
Jim Kampen:		32–46	13–23		
Tom Smith (Missouri Intercollegiate Athletic Association) (1975–1980)
1975–76	Tom Smith	14–10	7–5		
1976–77	Tom Smith	16–10	10–2		
1977–78	Tom Smith	16–11	7–5		
1978–79	Tom Smith	14–13	5–7		
1979–80	Tom Smith	26–2	11–1		
Tom Smith:		86–46	40–20		
Lynn Nance (Missouri Intercollegiate Athletic Association) (1980–1985)
1980–81	Lynn Nance	20–9	11–3	1st	NCAA Round of 32
1981–82	Lynn Nance	20–9	8–4	2nd	NCAA Round of 32
1982–83	Lynn Nance	23–7	9–3	2nd	NCAA Round of 16
1983–84	Lynn Nance	29–3	11–1	1st	NCAA Champions
1984–85	Lynn Nance	22–7	9–3	1st	NCAA Round of 32
Lynn Nance:		114–35	48–14		
Jim Wooldridge (Missouri Intercollegiate Athletic Association) (1985–1991)
1985–86	Jim Wooldridge	17–10	9–3	2nd	
1986–87	Jim Wooldridge	20–8	8–6	3rd	
1987–88	Jim Wooldridge	18–10	8–6	4th	
1988–89	Jim Wooldridge	22–9	8–6	4th	NCAA Round of 16
1989–90	Jim Wooldridge	27–6	12–4	2nd	NCAA Round of 16
1990–91	Jim Wooldridge	27–5	13–3	2nd	NCAA Round of 16
Jim Wooldridge:		131–48	58–28		
Jerry Hughes – Interim (Mid-America Intercollegiate Athletics Association) (1991–1992)
1991–92	Jerry Hughes	15–13	7–9	7th	
Bob Sundvold (Mid-America Intercollegiate Athletics Association) (1992–1996)
1992–93	Bob Sundvold	13–14	6–10	7th	
1993–94	Bob Sundvold	22–8	12–4	2nd	NCAA Round of 64
1994–95	Bob Sundvold	24–8	11–5	4th	NCAA Elie Eight
1995–96	Bob Sundvold	22–9	9–7	3rd	NCAA Round of 32
Bob Sundvold:		81–39	38–26		
Don Doucette (Mid-America Intercollegiate Athletics Association) (1996–2002)
1996–97	Don Doucette	21–8	12–6	4th	NCAA Round of 64
1997–98	Don Doucette	14–13	8–8	5th	
1998–99	Don Doucette	14–14	6–10	7th	
1999–00	Don Doucette	16–11	9–9	5th	
2000–01	Don Doucette	12–15	7–11	6th	
2001–02	Don Doucette	12–15	6–12	7th	
Don Doucette:		89–76	48–56		
Kim Anderson (Mid-America Intercollegiate Athletics Association) (2002–2014)
2002–03	Kim Anderson	12–16	6–12	8th	
2003–04	Kim Anderson	18–10	10–8	4th	
2004–05	Kim Anderson	24–6	14–4	1st (tie)	NCAA D-II First Round
2005–06	Kim Anderson	24–8	11–5	2nd	NCAA D-II Second Round
2006–07	Kim Anderson	31–4	15–3	1st (tie)	NCAA Semifinals
2007–08	Kim Anderson	18–10	11–7	3rd (tie)	
2008–09	Kim Anderson	30–5	16–4	2nd	NCAA D-II Final Four
2009–10	Kim Anderson	27–4	18–2	1st	NCAA D-II Sweet 16
2010–11	Kim Anderson	18–11	13–9	5th	
2011–12	Kim Anderson	19–8	15–5	3rd	
2012–13	Kim Anderson	22–8	13–5	1st (tie)	NCAA D-II First Round
2013–14	Kim Anderson	30–5	16–3	1st	NCAA D-II Champions
Kim Anderson:		274–94 (.745)	158–67 (.702)		
Doug Karleskint (Mid-America Intercollegiate Athletics Association) (2014–2023)
2014–15	Doug Karleskint	35–7	14–5	2nd	NCAA D-II Second Round
2015–16	Doug Karleskint	14–15	8–14	12th	
2016–17	Doug Karleskint	21–9	13–6	2nd	
2017–18	Doug Karleskint	20–10	11–8	5th (tie)	
2018–19	Doug Karleskint	14–14	7–12	10th (tie)	
2019–20	Doug Karleskint	10–18	5–14	12th	
2020–21	Doug Karleskint	7–15	7–15	12th	
2021–22	Doug Karleskint	13–14	10–12	7th (tie)	
2022–23	Doug Karleskint	11–17	7–15	11th	
Adam Bohac (Mid-America Intercollegiate Athletics Association) (2023–present)
2023–24	Adam Bohac	13–15	8–14	11th	
2024–25	Adam Bohac	15–15	9–10	6th (tie)	
2025–26	Adam Bohac	24–10	14–5	2nd	
Adam Bohac:		52–40 (.565)	31–19 (.620)		
Total:		1,802–1,083 (.625)			
National champion Postseason invitational champion Conference regular season champion Conference regular season and conference tournament champion Division regular season champion Division regular season and conference tournament champion Conference tournament champion
