= Derrick Clark (basketball) =

American college basketball coach

Biographical details
- Born: March 3, 1971 (age 55); Muncie, Indiana

Playing career
- 1993–1995: Cal Lutheran
- 1995–1997: Shepparton Gators

Coaching career (HC unless noted)
- 1997–2005: Metro State (assistant)
- 2005–2007: Air Force (assistant)
- 2007–2010: Colorado (assistant)
- 2010–2017: Metro State
- 2017–2020: Loyola Marymount (assistant)

Head coaching record
- Overall: 173–50 (.776)

Accomplishments and honors

Awards
- 2× RMAC Coach of the Year (2013, 2014)

Derrick Clark (born March 3, 1971) is an American college basketball coach, currently an assistant coach at Loyola Marymount University. He was previously head coach at Metro State University in Denver, Colorado.

Clark played for coach Mike Dunlap at California Lutheran University. After a short professional career in Australia, he joined Dunlap's coaching staff at Metro State and was on the bench for the Roadrunners' two Division II national championships in 1999 and 2002. In 2005, Clark left Metro State to join Jeff Bzdelik's staff at Division I Air Force, later following Bzdelik to Colorado.

In 2010, Clark was named head coach at Metro State, following Brannon Hays. Clark had immediate success at Metro State, leading the Roadrunners to back to back NCAA tournament appearances. In 2013, he led the team to the Division II national championship game, where the Roadrunners fell to Drury University 74–73. The next season, MSU went 32–2, undefeated in the Rocky Mountain Athletic Conference, and again went to the Division II Final Four. There they were upset by eventual champion Central Missouri.

== Head coaching record ==
Record table
Season	Team	Overall	Conference	Standing	Postseason
Metro State (Rocky Mountain Athletic Conference) (2010–present)
2010–11	Metro State	22–8	17–5	2nd	NCAA Division II Sweet 16
2011–12	Metro State	25–7	17–5	2nd	NCAA Division II Elite Eight
2012–13	Metro State	32–3	20–2	1st	NCAA Division II Runner-up
2013–14	Metro State	32–2	22–0	1st	NCAA Division II Final Four
2014–15	Metro State	26–6	19–3	T-1st	NCAA Division II First Round
2015–16	Metro State	19–11	16–6	T-3rd	
2016–17	Metro State	17–13	12–10	6th	
Metro State:		173–50 (.776)	123–31 (.799)		
Total:		173–50 (.776)			
National champion Postseason invitational champion Conference regular season champion Conference regular season and conference tournament champion Division regular season champion Division regular season and conference tournament champion Conference tournament champion
