= Patrick Mutombo =

Congolese basketball player and coach

BYU Cougars
- Title: Assistant coach
- League: Big 12 Conference

Personal information
- Born: March 7, 1980 (age 46) Kinshasa, Zaire
- Listed height: 6 ft 6 in (1.98 m)
- Listed weight: 210 lb (95 kg)

Career information
- College: Metro State (1999–2003)
- NBA draft: 2003: undrafted
- Playing career: 2003–2010
- Position: Small forward
- Coaching career: 2011–present

Career history

Playing
- 2003–2004: Pallacanestro Messina
- 2004–2005: Roseto Sharks
- 2005–2006: Air Avellino
- 2006–2007: Pallalcesto Udine
- 2007: CETAF/Vila Velha
- 2008: Ferrara
- 2009: Trikala 2000
- 2009–2010: Bakersfield Jam

Coaching
- 2011–2012: Metro State (assistant)
- 2012–2015: Denver Nuggets (assistant)
- 2015–2016: Austin Spurs (assistant)
- 2016–2020: Toronto Raptors (assistant)
- 2020–2021: Raptors 905
- 2022–2023: Phoenix Suns (assistant)
- 2023–2024: Milwaukee Bucks (assistant)
- 2024–2025: Memphis Grizzlies (assistant)
- 2025–2026: USA Basketball (assistant)
- 2026–present: BYU (assistant)

Career highlights
- As player: 2× NCAA Division II champion (2000, 2002); NCAA Division II Tournament MVP (2002); RMAC Player of the Year (2002); 2× First-team All-RMAC (2002, 2003); As assistant coach: NBA champion (2019)

Patrick Mutombo (born March 7, 1980) is a Congolese professional basketball coach and former player who is an assistant coach for the Brigham Young University Cougars. Mutombo has held various coaching roles at the professional and minor league levels in the United States and in other countries, including coaching with USA Basketball and winning a championship as an assistant coach for the NBA's Toronto Raptors in 2019. As a player, he won two NCAA Division II championships with the MSU Denver Roadrunners and was named the 2002 NCAA Division II Tournament MVP; and he played several years professionally, most notably in Italy's Lega Basket Serie A.

== Playing career ==
Mutombo played for Metro State, coached by Mike Dunlap, from 1999 to 2003. In his time there he was a member of two NCAA Division II national championship teams in 2000 and 2002. As a junior in 2002, Mutombo scored 29 points in the championship game against Kentucky Wesleyan and was named the tournament Most Valuable Player. For his career, Mutombo was twice named first team All-Rocky Mountain Athletic Conference and in 2002 was the conference player of the year. For his career he scored 1,360 points and in 2011 was named to the Metro State Athletic Hall of Fame.

Following the close of his college career, Mutombo signed with Pallacanestro Messina of Italy's top league. After averaging 7.8 points per game in his first season, Mutombo played another three years in Lega Basket Serie A for Roseto, Air Avellino and Pallalcesto Udine. Over the next three years, Mutombo played in Brazil, Greece and return to Italy. His last playing stint was with the Bakersfield Jam of the NBA Development League.

== Coaching career ==
In 2011, Mutombo joined the Denver Nuggets as player development coordinator. In 2012, he was promoted to assistant coach.

On October 7, 2015, he was hired by the Austin Spurs of the NBA Development League as an assistant coach.

Mutombo joined the Toronto Raptors as an assistant in the 2016–17 NBA season. Mutumbo won his first championship when the Raptors defeated the Golden State Warriors in the 2019 NBA Finals.

On December 4, 2020, Mutombo became the head coach of the Toronto Raptors NBA G League affiliate, the Raptors 905. During his tenure as head coach, several future NBA players spent time with the Raptors 905, including championship player Gary Payton II.

After several years as head coach of the Raptors 905, the Phoenix Suns hired Mutombo as an assistant coach on June 28, 2022. Mutombo's coaching position for the Raptors 905 was later taken by former Toronto Raptors assistant coach Eric Khoury.

On August 31, 2026, BYU announced Mutombo had joined their basketball staff as an assistant under head coach Kevin Young.

== Personal life ==
Patrick Mutombo holds no known relation to Dikembe Mutombo, although he is frequently asked if he does.

== See also ==
- List of foreign NBA coaches
