= 2015 NCAA Division II men's basketball tournament =

- Teams: 64
- Finals site: Ford Center, Evansville, Indiana
- Champions: Florida Southern Moccasins (2nd title)
- Runner-up: Indiana Crimson Hawks (2nd title game)
- Semifinalists: Tarleton State Texans (2nd Final Four); Bellarmine Knights (3rd Final Four)
- Winning coach: Linc Darner (1st title)
- MOP: Kevin Capers (Florida Southern)
- Attendance: TBD

The 2015 NCAA Division II men's basketball tournament involved 64 teams playing in a single-elimination tournament to determine the national champion of men's NCAA Division II college basketball. It began on March 13, 2015, following the 2014–15 season and concluded with the championship game on March 28, 2015.

The eight regional winners met in the Elite Eight for the quarterfinal, semifinal, and championship rounds. For the second straight year, the final rounds were held at the Ford Center in Evansville, Indiana.

Florida Southern defeated Indiana (PA), 77–62, to win their second national championship and first title since the 1981 NCAA Division II tournament.

2015 NCAA Division II Men's sites - regionals (cyan) Elite Eight (red)

== Qualification ==
The champions of 22 of the 24 Division II basketball conferences qualified automatically. An additional 42 teams were selected as “at-large” participants by the selection committee. The first three rounds of the tournament were organized in regions comprising eight participants in groups of two or three conferences (two in the Atlantic and Midwest regions). The regionals were hosted at the home court of the top seeded team.

=== Automatic qualifiers ===
The following teams automatically qualified for the national tournament as the champions of their conference tournaments.

Conference	Team	Record	Appearance	Last Bid	Region
California Collegiate	Cal Poly Pomona	23–6	12th	2014	West
Central Atlantic	Philadelphia University	24–7	34th	2014	East
Central Intercollegiate	Livingstone	19–9	3rd	2014	Atlantic
Carolinas	North Greenville	22–9	1st	Never	Southeast
East Coast	Bridgeport	24–6	21st	2014	East
Great American	Arkansas Tech	18–13	7th	2014	Central
Great Lakes	Ferris State	23–8	10th	2011	Midwest
Great Lakes Valley	Drury	21–8	9th	2014	Midwest
Great Northwest	Seattle Pacific	23–7	25th	2014	West
Gulf South	Alabama–Huntsville	23–8	8th	2013	South
Heartland	St. Mary's (TX)	20–9	9th	2014	South Central
Lone Star	Texas A&M–Commerce	24–7	5th	2005	South Central
Mid-America	Pittsburg State	20–11	6th	2007	Central
Northeast-10	American International	23–6	10th	2011	East
Northern Sun	Augustana (SD)	30–2	12th	2013	Central
Pacific West	BYU–Hawaii	24–5	11th	2011	West
Peach Belt	Montevallo	24–8	10th	2014	Southeast
Pennsylvania State	Gannon	23–8	24th	2014	Atlantic
Rocky Mountain	Colorado–Colorado Springs	26–5	2nd	2014	South Central
South Atlantic	Carson–Newman	18–13	3rd	2014	Southeast
Southern Intercollegiate	Benedict (SC)	19–11	10th	2013	South
Sunshine State	Florida Southern	29–1	29th	2014	South

=== At-large qualifiers ===
Team	Record	Conference	Appearance	Last Bid	Region
Columbus State	22–7	Peach Belt	11th	2012	Southeast
Georgia Regents Augusta	23–6	Peach Belt	10th	2014	Southeast
Lincoln Memorial	29–2	South Atlantic	5th	2014	Southeast
Mount Olive	28–3	Carolinas	7th	2010	Southeast
UNC Pembroke	25–5	Peach Belt	3rd	2013	Southeast
Angelo State	26–5	Lone Star	5th	2009	South Central
Colorado Mines	23–4	Rocky Mountain	5th	2014	South Central
Metro State	26–5	Rocky Mountain	19th	2014	South Central
Midwestern State	21–8	Lone Star	10th	2014	South Central
Tarleton State	27–3	Lone Star	12th	2014	South Central
Azusa Pacific	24–5	Pacific West	1st	Never	West
Cal Baptist	24–6	Pacific West	2nd	2014	West
Chico State	22–7	California Collegiate	12th	2014	West
Dixie State	20–7	Pacific West	6th	2014	West
Western Oregon	23–6	Great Northwest	1st	Never	West
Fairmont State	21–10	Mountain East	7th	2013	Atlantic
Glenville State	22–10	Mountain East	2nd	2014	Atlantic
Indiana (PA)	26–6	Pennsylvania State	14th	2014	Atlantic
Mercyhurst	20–8	Pennsylvania State	1st	Never	Atlantic
Slippery Rock	20–10	Pennsylvania State	5th	2013	Atlantic
West Liberty	27–2	Mountain East	7th	2014	Atlantic
Saint Anselm	19–9	Northeast-10	18th	2014	East
S. Connecticut State	22–7	Northeast-10	6th	2014	East
SNHU	21–7	Northeast-10	18th	2013	East
Stonehill	19–9	Northeast-10	13th	2012	East
U. of the Sciences	24–5	Central Atlantic	1st	Never	East
Barry	24–4	Sunshine State	5th	2014	South
Lynn	19–9	Sunshine State	5th	2005	South
Union (TN)	20–10	Gulf South	3rd	1968	South
West Alabama	22–11	Gulf South	4th	2014	South
West Georgia	21–8	Gulf South	15th	2012	South
Bellarmine	27–3	Great Lakes Valley	16th	2014	Midwest
Indianapolis	23–5	Great Lakes Valley	10th	2014	Midwest
Lake Superior State	25–6	Great Lakes	4th	2014	Midwest
Lewis	21–8	Great Lakes Valley	14th	2012	Midwest
Michigan Tech	19–8	Great Lakes	9th	2014	Midwest
Wisconsin–Parkside	26–3	Great Lakes Valley	4th	2014	Midwest
Central Missouri	24–6	Mid-America	23rd	2014	Central
MSU–Mankato	24–7	Northern Sun	12th	2014	Central
MSU–Moorhead	32–3	Northern Sun	3rd	2012	Central
Northern State	23–8	Northern Sun	10th	2009	Central
NW Missouri State	23–6	Mid-America	15th	2014	Central

== Regionals ==
=== Southeast - Harrogate, Tennessee ===
Location: Tex Turner Arena Host: Lincoln Memorial University

First round Round of 64; March 14
1	Lincoln Memorial (29–2)	95
8	North Greenville (22–9)	62
4	Mount Olive (28–3)	84
5	GRU Augusta (23–6)	75
2	Montevallo (24–8)	74
7	Carson–Newman (18–13)	69
3	UNC Pembroke (25–5)	89
6	Columbus State (22–7)	82

Regional semifinal Round of 32; March 15
1	Lincoln Memorial	55
4	Mount Olive	75
2	Montevallo	78
3	UNC Pembroke	59

Regional Final; Sweet 16; March 17
4	Mount Olive	82
2	Montevallo	75

=== South Central - Stephenville, Texas ===
Location: Wisdom Gym Host: Tarleton State University

First round Round of 64; March 14
1	Tarleton State (27–3)	71
8	St. Mary's (TX) (20–9)	52
4	UC Colorado Springs (26–5)	90
5	Colorado Mines (23–4)	87
2	Metro State (26–5)	56
7	Midwestern State (21–8)	58
3	TAMU–Commerce (24–7)	79
6	Angelo State (26–5)	85

Regional semifinal Round of 32; March 15
1	Tarleton State	84
4	UC Colorado Springs	62
7	Midwestern State	49
6	Angelo State	66

Regional Final; Sweet 16; March 17
1	Tarleton State	66
6	Angelo State	64

=== West - Azusa, California ===
Location: Felix Event Center Host: Azusa Pacific University

First round Round of 64; March 13
1	Azusa Pacific (24–5)	75
8	Western Oregon (23–6)	67
4	Dixie State (20–7)	60
5	Cal Poly Pomona (23–6)	62
2	BYU–Hawaii (24–5)	69
7	Seattle Pacific (23–7)	81
3	Cal Baptist (24–6)	67
6	Chico State (22–7)	61

Regional semifinal Round of 32; March 14
1	Azusa Pacific	77
5	Cal Poly Pomona	67
7	Seattle Pacific	77
3	Cal Baptist	78

Regional Final; Sweet 16; March 16
1	Azusa Pacific	91
3	Cal Baptist	79

=== Atlantic - West Liberty, West Virginia ===
Location: Academic, Sports and Recreation Complex (ASRC) Host: West Liberty University

First round Round of 64; March 14
1	West Liberty (27–2)	127
8	Livingstone (19–9)	89
4	Fairmont State (21–10)	68
5	Mercyhurst (20–8)	63
2	Gannon (23–8)	57
7	Slippery Rock (20–10)	65
3	Indiana (PA) (26–6)	73
6	Glenville State (22–10)	59

Regional semifinal Round of 32; March 15
1	West Liberty	89
4	Fairmont State	59
7	Slippery Rock	65
3	Indiana (PA)	73

Regional Final; Sweet 16; March 17
1	West Liberty	74
3	Indiana (PA)	77

=== East - Springfield, Massachusetts ===
Location: Botuva Gymnasium Host: American International College

First round Round of 64; March 14
1	American International (23–6)	58
8	Philadelphia U. (24–7)	53
4	Bridgeport (24–6)	75
5	S. Connecticut State (22–7)	88
2	SNHU (21–7)	71
7	Stonehill (19–9)	59
3	Saint Anselm (19–9)	57
6	U. of the Sciences (24–5)	73

Regional semifinal Round of 32; March 15
1	American International	65
5	S. Connecticut State	86
2	SNHU	59
6	University of the Sciences	53

Regional Final; Sweet 16; March 17
5	S. Connecticut State	58
2	SNHU	76

=== South - Lakeland, Florida ===
Location: Jenkins Field House Host: Florida Southern College

First round Round of 64; March 14
1	Florida Southern (29–1)	89
8	Benedict (19–11)	68
4	West Georgia (21–8)	80
5	West Alabama (22–11)	79
2	Barry (24–4)	73
7	Union (TN) (20–10)	59
3	Alabama–Huntsville (23–8)	62
6	Lynn (19–9)	80

Regional semifinal Round of 32; March 15
1	Florida Southern	84
4	West Georgia	81
2	Barry	82
6	Lynn	90

Regional Final; Sweet 16; March 17
1	Florida Southern	88
6	Lynn	80

=== Midwest - Louisville, Kentucky ===
Location: Knights Hall Host: Bellarmine University

First round Round of 64; March 14
1	Bellarmine (27–3)	84
8	Drury (21–8)	60
4	Lake Superior State (25–6)	78
5	Ferris State (23–8)	69
2	Wisconsin–Parkside (26–3)	62
7	Lewis (21–8)	70
3	Indianapolis (23–5)	74
6	Michigan Tech (19–8)	53

Regional semifinal Round of 32; March 15
1	Bellarmine	85
4	Lake Superior State	59
7	Lewis	59
3	Indianapolis	78

Regional Final; Sweet 16; March 17
1	Bellarmine	81
3	Indianapolis	72

=== Central - Sioux Falls, South Dakota ===
Location: Sanford Pentagon Host: Augustana College

First round Round of 64; March 14
1	Augustana (SD) (30–2)	104
8	Arkansas Tech (18–13)	77
4	NW Missouri State (23–6)	59
5	MSU–Mankato (24–7)	56
2	MSU–Moorhead (32–3)	80
7	Pittsburg State (20–11)	68
3	Central Missouri (24–6)	82
6	Northern State (23–8)	72

Regional semifinal Round of 32; March 15
1	Augustana (SD)	65
4	NW Missouri State	66
2	MSU–Moorhead	71
3	Central Missouri	60

Regional Final; Sweet 16; March 17
4	NW Missouri State	42
2	MSU–Moorhead	47

== Elite Eight - Evansville, Indiana ==
Location: Ford Center Host: University of Southern Indiana

National Quarterfinals; Elite Eight; Wednesday, March 25
SE4	Mount Olive	59
SC1	Tarleton State	77
W1	Azusa Pacific	65
A3	Indiana (PA)	69
E2	SNHU	70
S1	Florida Southern	81
MW1	Bellarmine	92
C2	MSU–Moorhead	75

National semifinals Final Four; Thursday, March 26
SC1	Tarleton State	68
A3	Indiana (PA)	72
S1	Florida Southern	79
MW1	Bellarmine	76

National Championship; Saturday, March 28
A3	Indiana (PA)	62
S1	Florida Southern	77

== All-tournament team ==
- Kevin Capers (Florida Southern)
- Devante Chance (Indiana (PA))
- Shawn Dyer (Indiana (PA))
- Jacobo Diaz (Indiana (PA))
- Dylan Travis (Florida Southern)
