= Drew Williamson =

Australian basketball player (born 1983)

Personal information
- Born: 15 December 1983 (age 42) Sydney, New South Wales, Australia
- Listed height: 196 cm (6 ft 5 in)
- Listed weight: 95 kg (209 lb)

Career information
- High school: Barker College (Sydney, New South Wales)
- College: Fordham (2002–2004); MSU Denver (2004–2006)
- NBA draft: 2006: undrafted
- Playing career: 2004–2019
- Position: Shooting guard

Career history
- 2004: Parramatta Wildcats
- 2006–2008: Townsville Crocodiles
- 2007: Mackay Meteors
- 2008: Hornsby Spiders
- 2008–2009: Sydney Spirit
- 2009–2010: Brisbane Spartans
- 2009–2012: Perth Wildcats
- 2011–2019: East Perth Eagles

Career highlights
- NBL champion (2010); SBL champion (2014); First-team All-RMAC (2006)

Drew Williamson (born 15 December 1983) is an Australian former professional basketball player. He played four years of college basketball in the United States, two for the Fordham Rams and two for the MSU Denver Roadrunners. He made his debut in the National Basketball League (NBL) in 2006 and played six seasons, winning an NBL championship with the Perth Wildcats in 2010. In the State Basketball League (SBL), he played nine seasons for the East Perth Eagles and won an SBL championship in 2014.

== Early life ==
Williamson was born in Sydney, New South Wales, in the suburb of Thornleigh. He attended Barker College in Sydney, where he played three years of basketball and graduated from in 2001. In 2004, he had a two-game stint with the Parramatta Wildcats of the Waratah League.

== College career ==
Williamson moved to the United States in 2002 to play college basketball. He played his first two years for the Fordham Rams in the NCAA Division I. As a freshman in 2002–03, he played 28 games with 15 starts and averaged 6.4 points, 2.8 rebounds, 1.5 assists and 1.4 steals in 24.9 minutes per game. As a sophomore in 2003–04, he played 25 games with 12 starts and averaged 6.0 points, 2.6 rebounds and 1.3 assists in 21.9 minutes per game.

Williamson played his last two years for the MSU Denver Roadrunners in the NCAA Division II. In 2004–05, he averaged 4.5 points, 1.8 rebounds and 1.3 assists in 33 games. In 2005–06, he was named first-team All-RMAC after averaging 16.6 points, 4.1 rebounds, 3.0 assists and 3.7 steals in 31 games.

== Professional career ==
=== NBL ===
Williamson joined the Townsville Crocodiles of the National Basketball League (NBL) for the 2006–07 season. He made no starts in his rookie season but started in 13 of his 27 games for the Crocodiles in the 2007–08 season. In November 2007, he suffered a serious shoulder injury during a game against the Wollongong Hawks.

Williamson joined the Sydney Spirit for the 2008–09 NBL season. In 30 games, he averaged 7.5 points, 2.1 rebounds, 1.6 assists and 1.0 steals per game.

Williamson joined the Perth Wildcats for the 2009–10 NBL season. He was a member of the Wildcats' NBL championship-winning team in March 2010. He continued with the Wildcats in 2010–11 and 2011–12. The Wildcats made the decision to not renew Williamson's contract in May 2012. He averaged 4.1 points per game in 2011–12 but shot 26 per cent from 3-point range.

He finished his NBL career with 190 games, which included 98 consecutive games with the Wildcats.

=== State leagues ===
In 2007, Williamson played for the Mackay Meteors of the Queensland Basketball League. In the opening round of the season, he scored 46 points with nine 3-pointers alongside 13 rebounds and seven steals against the Gladstone Port City Power. He finished the season as the league's steals leader with 3.9 steals per game.

In 2008, Williamson played for the Hornsby Spiders in the Waratah League, averaging 18.5 points, 6.8 rebounds, 3.6 assists, 1.1 steals and 1.3 blocks in 10 games.

In 2009, Williamson played for the Brisbane Spartans of the South East Australian Basketball League (SEABL). He had a second stint with the Spartans during the 2010 SEABL season, averaging 16.3 points, 5.0 rebounds and 3.9 assists in 26 games.

In 2011, Williamson played for the East Perth Eagles of the State Basketball League (SBL). Initially joining the Eagles out of convenience while still in the NBL, he decided to continue to play for the club post his professional career. As captain of the Eagles in 2014, he helped the team win their maiden SBL championship. He continued to captain the Eagles up until the 2019 season. He did not re-join the Eagles for the 2020 season, finishing his SBL career with 199 games.

== National team ==
Williamson played for the Australian University National Team at the 2003 Summer Universiade in Korea and the 2005 Summer Universiade in Turkey.

== Personal life ==
Williamson and his wife Katie had a daughter in 2017.
