= Charles Bradley (basketball) =

American basketball player and coach (born 1959)

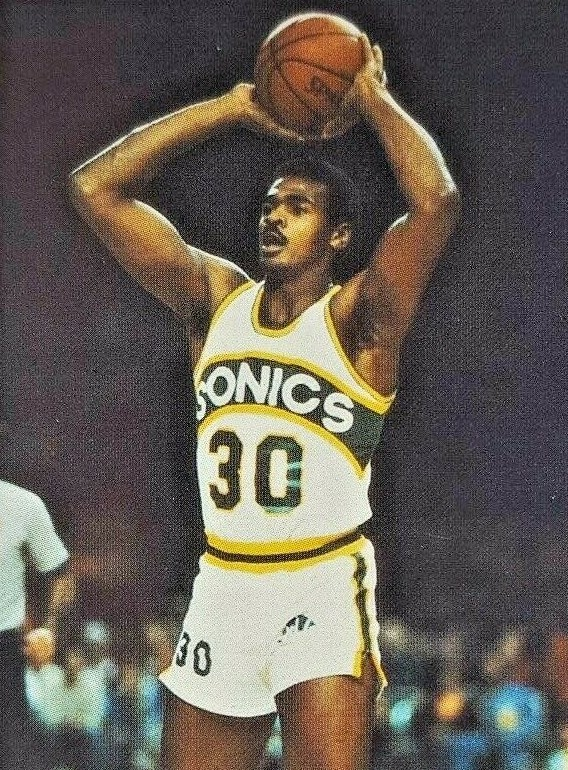

Personal information
- Born: May 16, 1959 (age 67) Havre de Grace, Maryland, U.S.
- Listed height: 6 ft 5 in (1.96 m)
- Listed weight: 215 lb (98 kg)

Career information
- High school: Edgewood (Edgewood, Maryland)
- College: Wyoming (1977–1981)
- NBA draft: 1981: 1st round, 23rd overall pick
- Drafted by: Boston Celtics
- Playing career: 1981–1984
- Position: Shooting guard
- Number: 35, 30

Career history

Playing
- 1981–1983: Boston Celtics
- 1983: Seattle SuperSonics
- 1983–1984: Albuquerque Silvers
- 1984: Wyoming Wildcatters

Coaching
- 1989–1994: BYU (assistant)
- 1994–1997: Metro State
- 1997–2000: Loyola Marymount

Career highlights
- 3× First-team All-WAC (1979–1981)
- Stats at NBA.com
- Stats at Basketball Reference

Charles Warnell Bradley (born May 16, 1959) is an American former basketball player and coach. He was selected by the Boston Celtics in the first round (23rd pick overall) of the 1981 NBA draft. Born in Havre de Grace, Maryland, Bradley was a 6'5" shooting guard from the University of Wyoming. He played in three National Basketball Association (NBA) seasons, from 1981 to 1984, with the Celtics and Seattle SuperSonics. In his NBA career, Bradley played in 110 games and scored a total of 347 points. He additionally played one season in the Continental Basketball Association (CBA). After being released by the SuperSonics, he split the majority of the 1983–84 season between the Albuquerque Silvers and Wyoming Wildcatters, averaging 12.9 points, 3.4 rebounds and 3.5 assists in 34 games.

Following his playing career, Bradley became a college coach, first as an assistant at Brigham Young, then as head coach at Metro State and Loyola Marymount (LMU). He was head coach at LMU from 1997 to 2000, resigning after a 2–26 season.

== Career statistics ==
Legend
GP	Games played	GS	Games started	MPG	Minutes per game
FG%	Field goal percentage	3P%	3-point field goal percentage	FT%	Free throw percentage
RPG	Rebounds per game	APG	Assists per game	SPG	Steals per game
BPG	Blocks per game	PPG	Points per game	**Bold**	Career high

=== NBA ===
==== Regular season ====
Year	Team	GP	GS	MPG	FG%	3P%	FT%	RPG	APG	SPG	BPG	PPG
1981–82	Boston	**51**	1	6.6	**.451**	.000	.677	.7	.4	.3	.1	3.0
1982–83	Boston	**51**	**5**	**10.4**	.392	.000	.511	**1.5**	.5	**.6**	**.5**	**3.6**
1983–84	Seattle	8	0	4.9	.429	–	**.714**	.4	**.6**	.0	.1	1.4
Career		110	6	8.3	.416	.000	.585	1.1	.5	.4	.3	3.2

==== Playoffs ====
Year	Team	GP	MPG	FG%	3P%	FT%	RPG	APG	SPG	BPG	PPG
1981–82	Boston	**7**	**2.6**	.250	–	.000	**.7**	**.1**	**.1**	.0	**.6**
1982–83	Boston	2	2.0	–	–	–	.0	.0	.0	.0	.0
Career		9	2.4	.250	–	.000	.6	.1	.1	.0	.4
