= Kim Anderson (basketball) =

American basketball player and coach

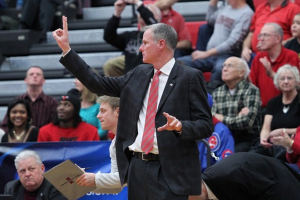
- Anderson coaching during a game in 2011

Personal information
- Born: May 12, 1955 (age 71) Sedalia, Missouri, U.S.
- Listed height: 6 ft 7 in (2.01 m)
- Listed weight: 200 lb (91 kg)

Career information
- High school: Smith-Cotton (Sedalia, Missouri)
- College: Missouri (1973–1977)
- NBA draft: 1977: 2nd round, 28th overall pick
- Drafted by: Portland Trail Blazers
- Playing career: 1977–1982
- Position: Small forward
- Number: 42
- Coaching career: 1982–present

Career history

Playing
- 1977–1978: Libertas Forlì
- 1978–1979: Portland Trail Blazers
- 1979–1980: Libertas Forlì
- 1981–1982: Mulhouse

Coaching
- 1982–1985: Missouri (assistant)
- 1985–1991: Baylor (assistant)
- 1991–1999: Missouri (assistant)
- 2002–2014: Central Missouri
- 2014–2017: Missouri
- 2017–2022: Pittsburg State

Career highlights
- As player: Big Eight Player of the Year (1977); First-team All-Big Eight (1977); As coach: NCAA Division II National Championship (2014); 4× MIAA regular season champion (2005, 2007, 2010, 2014); 2× MIAA Tournament champion (2009, 2014); 2× MIAA Coach of the Year (2005, 2010); NABC Division II Coach of the Year (2014)
- Stats at NBA.com
- Stats at Basketball Reference

Keith Kim Anderson (born May 12, 1955) is an American former basketball coach and most recently was head coach for the Pittsburg State Gorillas. Before his coaching career, Anderson was a professional basketball player, having stints in Italy, France, and with the Portland Trail Blazers.

== Playing career ==
Born in Sedalia, Missouri, he played collegiately for the University of Missouri, and was drafted in the NBA twice: by the Portland Trail Blazers in the second round (28th pick overall) of the 1977 NBA draft, and by the Milwaukee Bucks in the seventh round (146th pick overall) of the 1978 NBA draft.

He played for the Trail Blazers (1978–79) in the NBA for 21 games.

== Coaching career ==
He was a court coach for Team USA during the Pan American Games Team Trials.

As head coach, he led the Central Missouri Mules to back-to-back MIAA championships and three appearances in the NCAA Division II Final Four in 2007, 2009 and 2014. In 2014, he led the Mules to the NCAA Men's Division II Basketball Championship by defeating West Liberty 84–77.

In 2014, after the Mules' championship run, Anderson took over the head coaching job vacated by Frank Haith at the University of Missouri, his alma mater. After three seasons of finishing in last place in the Southeastern Conference, Missouri asked him to step down on March 5, 2017.

In March 2017, Anderson was hired as the Pittsburg State men's basketball coach, returning to the MIAA. Anderson decided to retire as Pittsburgh State's head coach after the 2021–22 season, his fifth season.

== Career playing statistics ==
Legend
GP	Games played	GS	Games started	MPG	Minutes per game
FG%	Field goal percentage	3P%	3-point field goal percentage	FT%	Free throw percentage
RPG	Rebounds per game	APG	Assists per game	SPG	Steals per game
BPG	Blocks per game	PPG	Points per game	**Bold**	Career high

=== NBA ===
==== Regular season ====
Year	Team	GP	MPG	FG%	FT%	RPG	APG	SPG	BPG	PPG
1978–79	Portland	21	10.7	.312	.536	2.1	.7	.2	.2	3.0

== Head coaching record ==
Record table
Season	Team	Overall	Conference	Standing	Postseason
**Central Missouri Mules** (Mid-America Intercollegiate Athletics Association) (2002–2014)
2002–03	Central Missouri	12–16	6–12	8th	
2003–04	Central Missouri	18–10	10–8	4th	
2004–05	Central Missouri	24–6	14–4	1st (tie)	NCAA D-II First round
2005–06	Central Missouri	24–8	11–5	2nd	NCAA D-II Second round
2006–07	Central Missouri	31–4	15–3	1st (tie)	NCAA D-II Final Four
2007–08	Central Missouri	18–10	11–7	3rd (tie)	
2008–09	Central Missouri	30–5	16–4	2nd	NCAA D-II Final Four
2009–10	Central Missouri	27–4	18–2	1st	NCAA D-II Sweet 16
2010–11	Central Missouri	18–11	13–9	5th	
2011–12	Central Missouri	19–8	15–5	3rd	
2012–13	Central Missouri	22–8	13–5	1st (tie)	NCAA D-II First round
2013–14	Central Missouri	30–5	16–3	1st	NCAA D-II Champions
Central Missouri:		274–94 (.745)	158–67 (.702)		
**Missouri Tigers** (Southeastern Conference) (2014–2017)
2014–15	Missouri	9–23	3–15	14th	
2015–16	Missouri	10–21	3–15	14th	
2016–17	Missouri	8–24	2–16	T–13th	
Missouri:		27–68 (.284)	8–46 (.148)		
**Pittsburg State Gorillas** (Mid-America Intercollegiate Athletics Association) (2017–present)
2017–18	Pittsburg State	17–13	9–10	T–8th	
2018–19	Pittsburg State	17–13	9–10	T–6th	
2019–20	Pittsburg State	12–18	7–12	T–9th	
2020–21	Pittsburg State	10–12	10–12	10th	
2021–22	Pittsburg State	8–20	7–15	T-11th	
Pittsburg State:		64–76 (.457)	42–59 (.416)		
Total:		364–242 (.601)			
National champion Postseason invitational champion Conference regular season champion Conference regular season and conference tournament champion Division regular season champion Division regular season and conference tournament champion Conference tournament champion
