= Central Missouri Mules basketball =

- University: University of Central Missouri
- First season: 1905
- Head coach: Doug Karleskint (4th season)
- Location: Warrensburg, Missouri
- Arena: UCM Multipurpose Building (capacity: 6,500)
- Conference: The MIAA
- Nickname: Mules
- Colors: Cardinal and black
- All-time record: 1,675–955 (.637)

NCAA Division I tournament champions
- 1984, 2014
Other NCAA Division I tournament results
Final Four	1965, 1984, 2007, 2009, 2014
Elite Eight	1965, 1984, 1995, 2007, 2009, 2014
Sweet Sixteen	1970, 1983, 1984, 1989, 1990, 1991, 1995, 2007, 2009, 2010, 2014

NAIA tournament champions
- National Association of Intercollegiate Basketball: 1937, 1938
Other NAIA tournament results
Semifinals	NAIB: 1937, 1938 NAIA: 1942
Quarterfinals	NAIB: 1937, 1938, 1939 NAIA: 1942
Appearances	NAIB: 1937, 1938, 1939 NAIA: 1940, 1941, 1942, 1946

Conference tournament champions
- 1982, 1983, 1984, 2005, 2007, 2009, 2013

Conference regular-season champions
- 1912, 1913, 1920, 1924, 1936, 1937, 1938, 1939, 1940, 1941, 1950, 1956, 1964, 1968, 1979, 1980, 1983, 1984, 2004, 2006, 2009, 2011, 2012, 2013

Uniforms
Home	Away

The Central Missouri Mules basketball team represents the University of Central Missouri in Warrensburg, Missouri, in the NCAA Division II men's basketball competition (the school's women's basketball team is known as the "Jennies"). The team is currently coached by Doug Karleskint, who replaced Kim Anderson after his departure to become head coach at the University of Missouri. The Mules currently compete and are one of two founding members of the Mid-America Intercollegiate Athletics Association (MIAA). The basketball team plays its home games in the Multipurpose Building on campus.

== Overview ==
Central Missouri annually plays a twenty-two-game conference schedule that is preceded by an out-of-conference schedule that includes two exhibition games. The conference schedule consists of playing every MIAA member at least once, some twice.

== History ==
Central Missouri's basketball program was founded in 1905, thirty-four years after the university was founded. Prior to 1912, the Mules were an independent team; in 1912, the Mule were a founding member of the MIAA. Overall, the team has won 24 conference championships and four national titles.

=== The beginning: 1905–1912 ===
In 1905, the team's first year, Joe Ferguson was named the head coach and only played one game – Co. F Independence. In 1906, the team's first full season, Ferguson led the Normals (as they were known until 1919) to a 7–8 record. In the 1907–08 season, the team's losing record switched and finished with a 7–2 record with Guy Lowman as the coach. In 1908, A.A. Mason took over the team for seasons leaving with a record of 16–10. Frank Winters then took over for the next two seasons as head coach, finishing in 1912 with a record of 9–11.

Statistics overview
The beginning: 1905–1912 — Year-by-Year record
Season	Team	Overall	Conference	Standing	Postseason
Joe Ferguson (No conference) (1905–1907)
1905–06	Joe Ferguson	0–1			
1906–07	Joe Ferguson	7–8			
Joe Ferguson:		7–9			
Guy Lowman (No conference) (1907–1908)
1907–08	Guy Lowman	7–2			
Guy Lowman:		7–2			
Appleton A. Mason (No conference) (1908–1910)
1908–09	Appleton A. Mason	10–4			
1909–10	Appleton A. Mason	6–6			
Appleton A. Mason:		16–10			
Frank Winters (No conference) (1910–1912)
1910–11	Frank Winters	4–3			
1911–12	Frank Winters	5–8			
Frank Winters:		9–11			
Total:		116–81			
National champion Postseason invitational champion Conference regular season champion Conference regular season and conference tournament champion Division regular season champion Division regular season and conference tournament champion Conference tournament champion

=== A new era: first 30 years of the MIAA (1912–1946) ===
1912 began a new era for the Normals basketball team: the team became a founding member of the Missouri Intercollegiate Athletic Association, and Forrest C. "Phog" Allen took the reins as head coach. In his first two seasons as head coach, Allen lead the team to back-to-back MIAA championships, combining an overall record of 26–11 and 15–1 MIAA record. The next five seasons, Allen lead the Normals to a record of 58–20 and leaving in 1919 to return to his alma mater, The University of Kansas.

After Allen left for KU, Willard N. Greim took over as coach for the next four seasons. During Greim's tenure, the Mules went 70–21 winning one conference championship in 1920–21. During the 1923 season, Greim coached the first two games, but then Tad C. Reid would coach the remainder of the season, as well as the next 14 seasons. During Reid's 15 seasons, the Mules won four MIAA championships and two National Association of Intercollegiate Basketball (NAIB) National championships. In both 1937 and 1938, Central Missouri won back-to-back NAIB National championships. In the 1937 Championship Game, the NAIB's first-ever tournament, Central Missouri took a 35–24 victory over Morningside College, and in 1938, the Mules defeated Roanoke College 45–30 to win their second straight national championship. Following the two back-to-back national championship seasons, Tom Scott led the Mules to an 87–35 record, winning the MIAA Championship for the next five seasons. Clarence Whiteman replaced Scott for one season, and Robert White followed for two more seasons. Scott returned for the 1945–46 season.

Statistics overview
A new era: first 30 years of the MIAA — Year-by-Year record
Season	Team	Overall	Conference	Standing	Postseason
Forrest C. Allen (Missouri Intercollegiate Athletic Association) (1912–1919)
1912–13	Forrest C. Allen	11–7	6–0	1st	
1913–14	Forrest C. Allen	15–4	9–1	1st	
1914–15	Forrest C. Allen	13–4			
1915–16	Forrest C. Allen	9–4			
1916–17	Forrest C. Allen	13–2			
1917–18	Forrest C. Allen	9–4			
1918–19	Forrest C. Allen	14–6			
Forrest C. Allen:		84–31	15–1		
Willard Greim (MIAA) (1919–1923)
1919–20	Willard Greim	17–2			
1920–21	Willard Greim	22–2	10–0		
1921–22	Willard Greim	14–6			
1922–23	Willard Greim	15–11			
1923	Willard Greim	2–0			
Willard Greim:		70–21	10–0		
Tad C. Reid (MIAA) (1923–1938)
1923–24	Tad C. Reid	19–7			
1924–25	Tad C. Reid	14–7			
1925–26	Tad C. Reid	6–12	2–6		
1926–27	Tad C. Reid	8–7	7–5		
1927–28	Tad C. Reid	7–10	6–6		
1928–29	Tad C. Reid	11–8	9–7		
1929–30	Tad C. Reid	13–7	10–6		
1930–31	Tad C. Reid	9–7	6–2		
1931–32	Tad C. Reid	1–13	0–8		
1932–33	Tad C. Reid	10–8	4–4		
1933–34	Tad C. Reid	9–8	2–6		
1934–35	Tad C. Reid	13–6	5–3		
1935–36	Tad C. Reid	19–4	8–2		
1936–37	Tad C. Reid	17–3	9–1		NAIB National Champions
1937–38	Tad C. Reid	24–3	10–0		NAIB National Champions
Tad C. Reid:		178–110	59–56		
Tom Scott (MIAA) (1938–1942)
1938–39	Tom Scott	21–7	9–1		
1939–40	Tom Scott	17–8	7–3		
1940–41	Tom Scott	17–9	8–2		
1941–42	Tom Scott	19–7	10–0		
Tom Scott:		74–31	59–56		
Clarence Whiteman (MIAA) (1942–1943)
1942–43	Clarence Whiteman	4–14	1–9		
Clarence Whiteman:		4–14	1–9		
Robert White (MIAA) (1943–1945)
1943–44	Robert White	13–2			
1944–45	Robert White	7–11			
Robert White:		20–13			
Clarence Whiteman (MIAA) (1945–1946)
1945–46	Tom Scott	13–7	7–3		
Tom Scott:		13–7	7–3		
Total:		443–227			
National champion Postseason invitational champion Conference regular season champion Conference regular season and conference tournament champion Division regular season champion Division regular season and conference tournament champion Conference tournament champion

=== Post-World War II: 1946–1975 ===
For the next thirty years after World War II, the Mules saw six coaches come and go, a few who would later go on to lead some NCAA Division I teams very successfully. In 1946, Earl Keth, a member of the 1937 and 1938 Central Missouri State National Championship teams, took the reins as head coach, a position he would hold for 15 seasons. During Keth's first few seasons, the Mules began what would be one of eight losing seasons under Keth. It was not until the 1950–51 season that the Mules won a conference championship under Keth. The next few seasons, though, Keth's teams had losing records, and then winning another conference championship in 1956–57. In 1961, future-NCAA Division I coach, Gene Bartow, took over the program. During his three seasons, Bartow coached the Mules to a 47–21 record, before leaving for Valparaiso University. Following Bartow in 1965 was Joe B. Hall, who led the team to a 19–6 season, and an MIAA conference championship. Chuck Smith coached for one season, 1965–66, finishing with a 14–8, 7–3 MIAA record.

In 1966, Norm Short took over for the Mules, staying for six seasons. In that time Short led the team to a 74–69 record, with two conference championships. After the Mules fell to 7–19 in 1971–72, Jim Kampen replaced Short. Kampen led the team for three seasons with a total record of 32–46.

Statistics overview
Post-World War II: 1946–1975 — Year-by-Year record
Season	Team	Overall	Conference	Standing	Postseason
Earl Keth (MIAA) (1946–1975)
1946–47	Earl Keth	8–15	3–6		
1947–48	Earl Keth	14–11	6–4		
1948–49	Earl Keth	16–9	7–3		
1949–50	Earl Keth	14–12	7–3		
1950–51	Earl Keth	18–7	8–2		
1951–52	Earl Keth	12–8	7–3		
1952–53	Earl Keth	7–14	5–5		
1953–54	Earl Keth	11–8	5–5		
1954–55	Earl Keth	7–13	5–5		
1955–56	Earl Keth	9–11	7–3		
1956–57	Earl Keth	9–11	8–2		
1957–58	Earl Keth	9–10	5–5		
1958–59	Earl Keth	7–14	4–6		
1959–60	Earl Keth	5–17	2–8		
1960–61	Earl Keth	13–7	5–5		
Earl Keth:		159–167	84–65		
Gene Bartow (MIAA) (1961–1964)
1961–62	Gene Bartow	16–6	7–3		
1962–63	Gene Bartow	17–6	7–3		
1963–64	Gene Bartow	14–9	6–4		
Gene Bartow:		47–21	20–10		
Joe B. Hall (MIAA) (1964–1965)
1964–65	Joe B. Hall	19–6	9–1		NCAA Round of 32
Joe B. Hall:		19–6	9–1		
Chuck Smith (MIAA) (1965–1966)
1965–66	Chuck Smith	14–8	7–3		
Chuck Smith:		14–8	7–3		
Norm Short (MIAA) (1966–1972)
1966–67	Norm Short	12–11	4–6		
1967–68	Norm Short	10–13	4–6		
1968–69	Norm Short	14–9	8–2		
1969–70	Norm Short	19–6	8–2		NCAA Sweet Sixteen
1970–71	Norm Short	12–11	8–4		
1971–72	Norm Short	7–19	1–11		
Norm Short:		74–69	33–31		
Jim Kampen (MIAA) (1972–1975)
1972–73	Jim Kampen	12–14	4–8		
1973–74	Jim Kampen	10–16	4–8		
1974–75	Jim Kampen	10–16	5–5		
Jim Kampen:		32–46	13–23		
Total:		345–317			
National champion Postseason invitational champion Conference regular season champion Conference regular season and conference tournament champion Division regular season champion Division regular season and conference tournament champion Conference tournament champion

=== Another national championship: 1975–2002 ===
In 1975, Tom Smith took over the program for five years. During his five years as head coach, Smith led the Mules to an 86–46 overall record, winning the MIAA Championship in the 1979–80 season. After that season, Smith left for Valparaiso. Former Iowa State coach, Lynn Nance was hired as Smith's successor. During Nance's first season, the Mules won the conference championship. The next two seasons, Nance compiled a record of 43–16 overall with a 17–7 MIAA record. In the 1983–84 season, Nance led the Mules to A Conference Championship and the NCAA Men's Division II Basketball Championship. The following year, Nance led the Mules to another conference title and finished his career at Central Missouri with a 114–35 record. Nance left Warrensburg after the 1984-85 season, and Nance's assistant coach, Jim Wooldridge, took the reins of the program. In his final three seasons at the helm, Wooldridge led the Mules to the NCAA Tournament, with 20 or more wins each season. Wooldridge left for Southwest Texas State after the 1990–91 season, leaving Central Missouri with a 131–48 overall record. Jerry Hughes, current athletics director for Central Missouri, coached the 1991–92 season as the interim head coach, ending with a 15–13 record.

In 1992, Bob Sundvold was hired as the next head coach, which was his first coaching job. Under Sundvold, the Mules went 81–39 over four seasons. Sundvold's squads made three trips to the NCAA Division II tournament, reaching the Elite Eight in 1995. After Sundvold left, Don Doucette arrived in Warrensburg, compiling a record of 89–76 over six seasons.

Statistics overview
Another national championship: 1975–2002 — Year-by-Year record
Season	Team	Overall	Conference	Standing	Postseason
Tom Smith (MIAA) (1975–1980)
1975–76	Tom Smith	14–10	7–5		
1976–77	Tom Smith	16–10	10–2		
1977–78	Tom Smith	16–11	7–5		
1978–79	Tom Smith	14–13	5–7		
1979–80	Tom Smith	26–2	11–1		NCAA Round of 32
Tom Smith:		87–38	40–20		
Lynn Nance (MIAA) (1980–1985)
1980–81	Lynn Nance	20–9	11–3		NCAA Round of 32
1981–82	Lynn Nance	20–9	8–4		NCAA Round of 32
1982–83	Lynn Nance	23–7	9–3		NCAA Sweet Sixteen
1983–84	Lynn Nance	29–3	11–1		NCAA Division II National Champions
1984–85	Lynn Nance	22–7	9–3		NCAA Round of 32
Lynn Nance:		114–35	48–14		
Jim Wooldridge (MIAA) (1985–1991)
1985–86	Jim Wooldridge	17–10	9–3		
1986–87	Jim Wooldridge	20–8	8–6		
1987–88	Jim Wooldridge	18–10	8–6		
1988–89	Jim Wooldridge	22–9	8–6		NCAA Sweet Sixteen
1989–90	Jim Wooldridge	27–6	12–4		NCAA Sweet Sixteen
1990–91	Jim Wooldridge	27–5	13–3		NCAA Sweet Sixteen
Jim Wooldridge:		131–48	58–28		
Jerry Hughes (interim) (MIAA) (1991–1992)
1991–92	Jerry Hughes	15–13	7–9		
Jerry Hughes:		15–13	7–9		
Bob Sundvold (MIAA) (1992–1996)
1992–93	Bob Sundvold	13–14	6–10		
1993–94	Bob Sundvold	22–8	12–4		NCAA Round of 32
1994–95	Bob Sundvold	24–8	11–5		NCAA Elite Eight
1995–96	Bob Sundvold	22–9	9–7		NCAA Round of 32
Bob Sundvold:		81–39	38–26		
Don Doucette (MIAA) (1996–2002)
1996–97	Don Doucette	21–8	12–6		NCAA Round of 48
1997–98	Don Doucette	14–13	8–8		
1998–99	Don Doucette	14–14	6–10		
1999–2000	Don Doucette	16–11	9–9		
2000–01	Don Doucette	12–15	7–11		
2001–02	Don Doucette	12–15	6–12		
Don Doucette:		89–76	48–56		
Total:		517–249			
National champion Postseason invitational champion Conference regular season champion Conference regular season and conference tournament champion Division regular season champion Division regular season and conference tournament champion Conference tournament champion

=== Kim Anderson: 2002–2014 ===
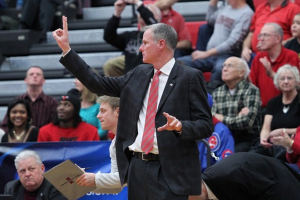
Anderson during an MIAA Conference game

On April 12, 2002, Kim Anderson was selected as the next head coach. While at Central Missouri, he won more games than any other coach in school history with a 274-95 (.743) career record. He guided the Mules to two Final Fours, five MIAA regular season championships, four MIAA Tournament Titles and one National Championship.

In the 2006–07 season, the Mules returned to the Division II Elite Eight in Springfield, Massachusetts. They defeated Montevallo to move on to the semi-finals, where they faced the then-unbeaten defending Division II champion Winona State. The Mules lost to Winona in overtime 90–85, ending the season 31–4, which set a new school record for most wins in a season. After the season, the NCAA announced that UCM led all of Division II in attendance for Men's Basketball, at 3,640 fans per home game.

In the 2013–14 season, Anderson led the Mules to a 30–5 overall record and captured the Division II National Championship in Evansville, Indiana. Anderson left to coach at his alma mater, the University of Missouri.

Statistics overview
Kim Anderson: 2002–2014 — Year-by-Year record
Season	Team	Overall	Conference	Standing	Postseason
Kim Anderson (MIAA) (2002–2014)
2002–03	Kim Anderson	13–15	6–12	8th	
2003–04	Kim Anderson	18–10	10–8	4th	
2004–05	Kim Anderson	24–7	14–4	1st (tie)	NCAA Tournament – Round of 64
2005–06	Kim Anderson	24–8	11–5	2nd	NCAA Tournament – Round of 32
2006–07	Kim Anderson	31–4	15–3	1st (tie)	NCAA Final Four
2007–08	Kim Anderson	18–10	11–7	3rd (tie)	
2008–09	Kim Anderson	30–5	16–4	2nd	NCAA Final Four
2009–10	Kim Anderson	27–4	18–2	1st	NCAA Sweet Sixteen
2010–11	Kim Anderson	18–11	13–9	5th	
2011–12	Kim Anderson	19–7	15–5	3rd	
2012–13	Kim Anderson	22–8	13–5	1st (tied)	NCAA Round of 64
2013–14	Kim Anderson	30–5	16–3	1st	NCAA Division II National Champions
Kim Anderson:		274–94	156–67		
Total:		274–94			
National champion Postseason invitational champion Conference regular season champion Conference regular season and conference tournament champion Division regular season champion Division regular season and conference tournament champion Conference tournament champion

=== Doug Karleskint: 2014–present ===
After Anderson left for Missouri, Doug Karleskint was hired as the next coach. In his first season, Karleskint led the Mules to a 25–7 record. That season included a regional appearance as Central Missouri bowed out in the regional semifinals.

Statistics overview
Season	Team	Overall	Conference	Standing	Postseason
Doug Karleskint (MIAA) (2014–present)
2014–15	Doug Karleskint	25–7	14–5	2nd	NCAA Round of 32
2015–16	Doug Karleskint	14–15	8–14	12th	
2016–17	Doug Karleskint	21–9	13–6	2nd	
2017–18	Doug Karleskint	20-10	11–8	5th	
Total:		60–31			
National champion Postseason invitational champion Conference regular season champion Conference regular season and conference tournament champion Division regular season champion Division regular season and conference tournament champion Conference tournament champion

== Record vs. MIAA opponents ==
Central Missouri vs. MIAA members
Current MIAA Members
Central Missouri vs.	First Game	Overall record	Last 5 meetings	Last 10 meetings	Current streak	Since Joining the MIAA
Central Oklahoma	1957–58	UCM, 6–5	UCM, 3–2	UCM, 6–4	W 1	UCM, 3–2
Emporia State	1906–07	UCM, 68–41	ESU, 2–3	UCM, 7–3	L 2	UCM, 29–18
Fort Hays State	1948–49	UCM, 12–8	UCM, 3–2	UCM, 6–4	W 2	UCM, 10–6
Lincoln^{†}	1954–55	UCM, 56–32	UCM, 5–0	UCM, 10–0	W 16	UCM, 45–28
Lindenwood	1979–80	UCM, 6–2	UCM, 4–1	UCM, 6–2	W 1	UCM, 4–2
Missouri Southern	1970–71	UCM, 36–23	UCM, 4–1	UCM, 8–2	L 1	UCM, 35–19
Missouri Western	1986–87	UCM, 33–27	UCM, 5–0	UCM, 8–2	W 7	UCM, 31–27
Nebraska–Kearney	1973–74	UCM, 4–3	UCM, 3–2	UCM, 4–3	L 1	UNK, 2–1
Northeastern State	2012–13	Tied, 2–2	Tied, 2–2	Tied, 2–2	W 1	Tied, 2–2
Northwest Missouri State	1919–20	UCM, 127–86	UCM, 3–2	UCM, 8–2	L 1	UCM, 122–91
Pittsburg State	1916–17	UCM, 70–41	UCM, 4–1	UCM, 8–2	W 4	UCM, 33–16
Southwest Baptist	1972–73	UCM, 41–22	UCM, 5–0	UCM, 9–1	W 9	UCM, 22–20
Washburn	1911–12	UCM, 49–46	WU, 2–3	Tied, 5–5	W 2	WU, 23–29
^{†} – Lincoln left the MIAA after the 1998–99 season and rejoined in the 2010–11 season.

== See also ==
- List of Central Missouri Mules basketball seasons
