= Dan Ficke =

American basketball coach

Current position
- Title: Head coach
- Team: MSU Denver
- Conference: RMAC

Playing career
- 2005–2009: Loyola (MD)

Coaching career (HC unless noted)
- 2009–2010: Boys' Latin School (MD) (assistant)
- 2013–2015: Loyola (MD) (assistant)
- 2015–2019: Denver (assistant)
- 2019–2022: Belmont Abbey
- 2022–present: MSU Denver

Administrative career (AD unless noted)
- 2010–2012: Wake Forest (Asst. DBO)
- 2012–2013: Wake Forest (assistant to HC/recruiting coordinator)

Head coaching record
- Overall: 121–82 (.596)

Accomplishments and honors

Championships
- 2 Conference Carolinas tournament (2021, 2022)

Dan Ficke is an American college basketball coach who is the head coach of the MSU Denver Roadrunners men's basketball team.

== Early life and playing career ==
Ficke grew up in Denver, Colorado and attended Regis Jesuit High School. He played college basketball at Loyola Maryland.

== Coaching career ==
Ficke began his coaching career as the junior varsity coach and assistant varsity coach at the Boys' Latin School of Maryland while completing his MBA at Loyola. He then took a position as the assistant director of basketball operations at Wake Forest in 2010. Ficke was promoted to assistant to the head coach and recruiting coordinator after one season. He was hired as an on-court assistant at Loyola Maryland in 2013. Ficke spent two seasons as an assistant at his alma mater before being hired as an assistant at University of Denver in 2015.

Ficke was hired as the head basketball coach at Belmont Abbey on July 19, 2019. He went 61–25 overall as the Crusaders' head coach and Belmont Abbey won the Conference Carolinas tournament in 2021 and 2022.

Ficke was hired as the head coach of the Metropolitan State University of Denver Roadrunners on April 21, 2022.

== Head coaching record ==
Statistics overview
Season	Team	Overall	Conference	Standing	Postseason
Belmont Abbey Crusaders (Conference Carolinas) (2019–2022)
2019–2020	Belmont Abbey	21–10	14–6	3rd	
2020–2021	Belmont Abbey	18–5	13–3	2nd	NCAA Division II First Round
2021–2022	Belmont Abbey	22–10	17–7	3rd	NCAA Division II First Round
Belmont Abbey:		61–25 (.709)	44–16 (.733)		
MSU Denver Roadrunners (Rocky Mountain Athletic Conference) (2022–present)
2022–2023	MSU Denver	12–17	9–13		
2023–2024	MSU Denver	19–10	13–9		
2024–2025	MSU Denver	19–10	13–7		
2025–2026	MSU Denver	10–18	8–12		
MSU Denver:		60–57 (.513)	43–41 (.512)		
Total:		121–82 (.596)			
National champion Postseason invitational champion Conference regular season champion Conference regular season and conference tournament champion Division regular season champion Division regular season and conference tournament champion Conference tournament champion
