= Kevin Capers =

American basketball player (born 1993)

No. 13 – Maccabi Rehovot
- Position: Point guard / shooting guard
- League: Liga Leumit

Personal information
- Born: May 2, 1993 (age 33)
- Listed height: 6 ft 2 in (1.88 m)
- Listed weight: 170 lb (77 kg)

Career information
- High school: Lake Wales (Lake Wales, Florida)
- College: Florida Southern (2011–2015)
- NBA draft: 2015: undrafted
- Playing career: 2015–present

Career history
- 2015–2017: Westchester Knicks
- 2017: Halcones de Ciudad Obregón
- 2017–2018: CSU Sibiu
- 2019: ÍR
- 2019–2020: Hapoel Ramat Gan Givatayim
- 2020–2021: Atomerőmű SE
- 2022–2023: Maccabi Ironi Ramat Gan
- 2023–2024: Trepça
- 2024–present: Maccabi Rehovot

Career highlights
- Kosovo Superleague champion (2024); Liga Unike champion (2024); Kosovo Cup (2024); CIBACOPA champion (2017); NCAA Division II champion (2015); NCAA Division II Tournament MVP (2015)

Kevin Jerome Capers (born May 2, 1993) is an American professional basketball player for Maccabi Rehovot of the Liga Leumit. He played college basketball for Florida Southern College before playing professionally in the NBA G League, Mexico, Romania, Iceland, Israel and Kosovo.

== Early life and college career ==
Capers attended Lake Wales High School in Lake Wales, Florida, where he averaged 8.9 points and 7.0 assists per game from his point guard position. Capers helped the Highlanders to go 31–3 win district and regional titles, and finish as the 2011 5A state runner-up to Dwyer High School.

Capers played college basketball at Florida Southern College, where averaged 17.7 points, 4.3 rebounds and 3.6 assists per game during his four years playing for Florida Southern, he led the Moccasins to the NCAA Division II National Championship as a senior as he earned the Finals MVP and All-tournament team honors.

== Professional career ==
=== Westchester Knicks (2015–2017) ===
Capers went undrafted in the 2015 NBA draft. On October 31, 2015, Capers was selected with the 57th pick of the 2015 NBA Development League draft by the Westchester Knicks. In 48 games played during the 2016–17 season for the Knicks, he averaged 8.9 points, 2 rebounds and 2.3 assists per game.

=== Obregón (2017) ===
On May 20, 2017, Capers signed with Halcones Ciudad Obregón of the Mexican CIBACOPA. On July 5, 2017, Capers recorded a season-high 32 points, while shooting 11-of-18 from the field, along with three rebounds and three assists in a 94–101 loss to Rayos de Hermosillo. In 25 games played for Obregón, he averaged 16.1 points and 5.4 assists per game as a complement to forward Glen Rice Jr. and his 28.1 points per game. The Hawks toppled the Hermosillo Rays 111–100 in Game 6 of the league finals to clinch the title.

=== CSU Sibiu (2017–2018) ===
On August 25, 2017, Capers signed with CSU Sibiu of the Romanian Liga Națională. In 11 games played for Sibiu, he averaged 10.8 points and 1.3 rebounds per game, while shooting 40.6 percent from three-point range.

=== ÍR (2019) ===
On January 3, 2019, Capers signed with ÍR of the Icelandic Úrvalsdeild. In 24 games played for ÍR, he finished the season as the league second-leading scorer with 22.3 points, to go with 4.7 rebounds, 5.2 assists and 2 steals per game. Capers led his team to the Úrvalsdeild Finals, where they eventually lost to KR in a five-game series. He missed the fifth and deciding game of the series after breaking a bone in his arm in game four.

=== Hapoel Ramat Gan (2019–2020) ===
On October 16, 2019, Capers signed a one-year deal with Hapoel Ramat Gan Givatayim of the Israel National League. On October 22, 2019, Capers set an Israeli State Cup-record 57 points, while shooting 20-of-32 from the field in a 94–104 loss to Hapoel Haifa in the first round. He finished as the top scorer in the league with 24.2 points per game, and recorded 4.1 rebounds, 5.1 assists and 2.3 steals per game.

=== Atomerőmű (2020–2021) ===
On August 8, 2020, Capers signed with Atomerőmű SE of the Hungarian League.

=== Trepça (2023–2024) ===
On December 30, 2023, Capers signed for Trepça of the Kosovo Superleague and Liga Unike.
