= Tom Smith (basketball) =

Biographical details
- Born: September 8, 1944 (age 82); Detroit, Michigan, U.S.

Coaching career (HC unless noted)
- 1975–1980: Central Missouri
- 1980–1988: Valparaiso
- 1988–2013: Missouri Western

Head coaching record
- Overall: 532–417

Tom Smith (born September 8, 1944) was the head men's basketball coach at Valparaiso University from 1980 until 1988. Smith played basketball at Horace Mann High School in Gary, Indiana and collegiately for Valparaiso. During his leadership, the Crusaders joined the AMCU in 1982. The 1983–1984 season was the first in Crusader history to appear in a conference tournament, losing to Western Illinois. His career record with the Crusaders was 84–138. Tom coached 25 of his 38 seasons at Missouri Western, where he compiled a 448–279 record. Smith coached the Griffons to 10 NCAA Division II national tournaments, five MIAA regular season championships and four MIAA postseason tournament titles. Smith has also been named MIAA Coach-of-the-year twice while he was at MWSU. Under Smith's guidance, Western has produced an MIAA Most valuable player, an MIAA tournament MVP, 45 All-MAA selections, six All-Region picks, and three NCAA All-Americans. He currently has a .586 overall winning percentage at the college level, ranking him in the top 20 active coaches, and also is the winningest coach in Missouri Western history.

== Head coaching record at MWSU ==
Record table
Season	Team	Overall	Conference	Standing	Postseason
Missouri Western Griffons (MIAA) (1988–2013)
1988–89	Missouri Western	18–15			
1989–90	Missouri Western	24–7	14–2	1st (tie)	
1990–91	Missouri Western	23–8	12–4		
1991–92	Missouri Western	22–10	11–5		
1992–93	Missouri Western	21–7	11–5		
1993–94	Missouri Western	20–9	10–6		
1994–95	Missouri Western	26–5	13–3	1st (tie)	
1995–96	Missouri Western	17–10	9–7		
1996–97	Missouri Western	20–9	13–5		
1997–98	Missouri Western	23–7	13–3	1st (tie)	
1998–99	Missouri Western	22–7	14–2	1st (tie)	
1999-00	Missouri Western	20–9	10–8		
2000–01	Missouri Western	18–9	12–6		
2001–02	Missouri Western	23–7	16–2	1st (tie)	
2002–03	Missouri Western	23–8	12–6		
2003–04	Missouri Western	14–15	7–11		
2004–05	Missouri Western	13–15	7–11		
2005–06	Missouri Western	17–11	8–8		
2006–07	Missouri Western	12–15	5–13		
2007–08	Missouri Western	9–18	3–15		
2008–09	Missouri Western	14–16	9–11		
2009–10	Missouri Western	18–12	12–8		
2010–11	Missouri Western	12–16	10–12		
2011–12	Missouri Western	9–17	4–16		
2012–13	Missouri Western	10–17	6–12		
Missouri Western:		448–279 (.616)	158–67 (.571)		
Total:		532–417(.561)			
National champion Postseason invitational champion Conference regular season champion Conference regular season and conference tournament champion Division regular season champion Division regular season and conference tournament champion Conference tournament champion
