= Tom Scott (basketball coach) =

American basketball coach (1908–1993)

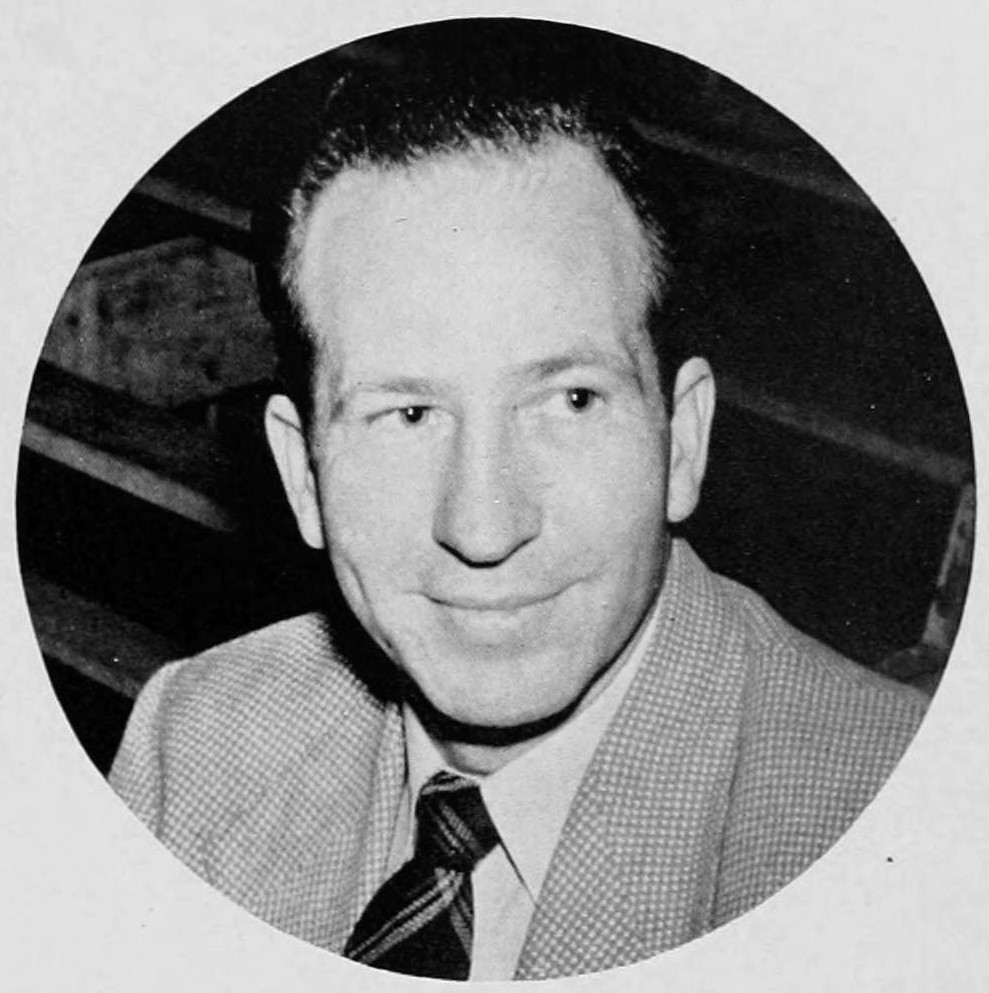
- Scott in 1948

Biographical details
- Born: January 6, 1908; Franklin, Kansas, U.S.
- Died: November 24, 1993 (aged 85); Charlotte, North Carolina, U.S.

Playing career
- 1927–1930: Pittsburg State

Coaching career (HC unless noted)
- 1936–1938: Concordia (MN)
- 1938–1942: Central Missouri State
- 1946–1952: North Carolina
- 1955–1960: Davidson

Administrative career (AD unless noted)
- 1955–1974: Davidson

Head coaching record
- Overall: 248–208

Tom Scott (January 6, 1908 – November 24, 1993) was a head coach of the University of North Carolina Tar Heels men's basketball team from 1946–1952. While at UNC, Scott amassed a record of 100–65. His last two teams at UNC had losing records and he was replaced by Frank McGuire as head coach.

A graduate of Kansas State Teachers College of Pittsburg (now Pittsburg State University) in 1930, Scott also coached at Concordia-Moorhead, Central Missouri State, and Davidson College and also serving as Davidson's Athletic Director from 1955 to 1974. As AD at Davidson he hired both Lefty Driesell and Terry Holland as head basketball coaches. He also coached the Davidson golf team to five Southern Conference championships. He was a chairman of the National Collegiate Athletic Association's basketball committee. Scott was inducted into the Davidson Athletics Hall of Fame in 1990 and the Central Missouri State Hall of Fame in 1993.

== Coaching career ==
=== Concordia ===
After starting out as a high school coach, Scott got his first major coaching job at Concordia-Moorhead. He spent two seasons there.

=== Central Missouri State ===
In his tenure with Central Missouri State, he led them to 87 wins and four conference championships in five seasons.

=== North Carolina ===
In 1946, Scott was hired to take over UNC's men's basketball team from Ben Carnevale. In his first four seasons, they had winning records. However, they won no conference championships and did not make the NCAA tournament. In his last two seasons, they finished with identical records of 12–15.

=== Davidson ===
Several years later, Scott became the coach and athletic director for Davidson College. His last season coaching was in the 1959–60 season.

== Administrative career ==
Although Scott stopped coaching by the 1960s, he was still active as Davidson's athletic director. As AD at Davidson he hired both Lefty Driesell and Terry Holland as head basketball coaches.

== Death ==
Scott died on November 24, 1993, after a lengthy illness. He is survived by a son, Tom Scott Jr. a daughter, Kristi Boykin, and three grandchildren.

== Head coaching record ==
Season	Team	Total Wins	Total Losses
1936–37	Concordia Moorhead	7	11
1937–38	Concordia Moorhead	14	12
1938–39	Central Missouri State	22	7
1939–40	Central Missouri State	17	8
1940–41	Central Missouri State	15	9
1941–42	Central Missouri State	20	7
1945–46	Central Missouri State	13	5
1946–47	North Carolina	19	8
1947–48	North Carolina	20	7
1948–49	North Carolina	20	8
1949–50	North Carolina	17	12
1950–51	North Carolina	12	15
1951–52	North Carolina	12	15
1955–56	Davidson	10	15
1956–57	Davidson	7	20
1957–58	Davidson	9	15
1958–59	Davidson	9	15
1959–60	Davidson	5	19
Totals		248	208
