= Don Doucette =

American former college basketball coach

Biographical details
- Born: February 23, 1952 (age 74)
- Education: UMass Boston

Coaching career (HC unless noted)

Basketball
- 1980–1981: Salem State
- 1983–1988: UMass Lowell
- 1988–1993: UNC Asheville
- 1993–1996: Chaminade
- 1996–2002: Central Missouri
- 2002–2003: Newbury
- 2003–2005: New Hampshire (assistant)

Administrative career (AD unless noted)
- 1993–1996: Chaminade
- 2002–2003: Newbury

Head coaching record
- Overall: 285–300

Accomplishments and honors

Championships
- NCAA Division II Tournament (1988)

Awards
- NABC NCAA D-II Coach of the Year (1988); PacWest Coach of the Year (1995)

Don Doucette (born February 23, 1952) is an American former college basketball coach.

During his first season coaching the UMass Lowell River Hawks, Doucette won 15 games for the first winning season in program history. He led the River Hawks to the 1988 NCAA Division II national championship. Following the season, he was hired to coach the UNC Asheville Bulldogs.

Doucette has been head coach at six schools and compiled a career record of 285 wins and 300 losses. Among his schools coached, Doucette also served as the athletic director for Chaminade and Newbury.

== Head coaching record ==
Record table
Season	Team	Overall	Conference	Standing	Postseason
Salem State Vikings (Massachusetts State Collegiate Athletic Conference) (1980–1981)
1980–81	Salem State	23–6	13–6		
Salem State:		23–6 (.793)	13–6		
UMass Lowell River Hawks (New England Collegiate Conference) (1983–1988)
1983–84	UMass Lowell	15–12	7–7		
1984–85	UMass Lowell	9–19	2–12		
1985–86	UMass Lowell	12–17	3–9		
1986–87	UMass Lowell	21–8	11–3		
1987–88	UMass Lowell	27–7	8–4		NCAA Division II Champions
UMass Lowell:		84–63 (.571)	31–35		
UNC Asheville Bulldogs (Big South Conference) (1988–1993)
1988–89	UNC Asheville	16–14	6–6	T–3rd	
1989–90	UNC Asheville	18–12	7–5	T–2nd	
1990–91	UNC Asheville	8–20	4–10	T–6th	
1991–92	UNC Asheville	9–19	6–8	T–5th	
1992–93	UNC Asheville	4–23	2–14	9th	
UNC Asheville:		55–88 (.385)	25–43		
Chaminade Silverswords (Pacific West Conference) (1993–1996)
1993–94	Chaminade	6–19	4–8		
1994–95	Chaminade	12–14	8–4		
1995–96	Chaminade	4–22	2–10		
Chaminade:		22–55 (.286)	14–22		
Central Missouri Mules (Mid-America Intercollegiate Athletics Association) (1996–2002)
1996–97	Central Missouri	21–8	12–6	4th	
1997–98	Central Missouri	14–13	8–8		
1998–99	Central Missouri	14–14	6–10		
1999–00	Central Missouri	16–11	9–9		
2000–01	Central Missouri	12–15	7–11		
2001–02	Central Missouri	12–15	6–12		
Central Missouri:		89–76 (.539)	48–56		
Newbury Nighthawks () (2002–2003)
2002–03	Newbury	12–12			
Newbury:		12–12 (.500)			
Total:		285–300 (.487)			
