= Earl Keth =

American basketball player and coach

Biographical details
- Born: August 8, 1913
- Died: April 19, 1972 (aged 58); Warrensburg, Missouri, U.S.

Playing career
- 1935–1938: Central Missouri State

Coaching career (HC unless noted)

Basketball
- 1946–1961: Central Missouri State

Golf
- 1961–1972: Central Missouri State

Accomplishments and honors

Championships
- Basketball; 4 MIAA (1951, 1952, 1956, 1957)

Awards
- Third-team All-American – Converse (1938); 2× First-team All-MIAA (1937, 1938)

Earl Kenneth Keth (August 8, 1913 – April 19, 1972) was an American basketball player and coach, known for his long association with the University of Central Missouri. Earl Keth, High School Calumet High School: City of Chicago Basketball Champions, and All City Selection: 1929,31,32: Northwestern University 1933, Basketball Team, Baseball Teams before transferring to Central Missouri State Teacher College. Post graduation: High School Teacher and Coach: Stover MO, Herman MO. Military1942: US Navy, Norfork Naval Base: Gunnery officer, Kimble R. Smith, Navy Basketball: Norfork Naval Training Station: Member of the NTS Basketball Team, Team Mates: Arnold 'Red" Auerbach, (Boston Celtics), Bill Holzman (New York Knicks) and others. 1943–1944 National Basketball Champions/Dual Championship with NCAA (due to WWII enlistment of Many collegiate athletes) NTS Record: Wins 31 Losses: 2: Earl Keth: Navy Tennis and Golf Intramural Champion 1944.

Keth was an All-American player for Central Missouri (then called "Central Missouri State College"), a third-team selection by Converse in 1938. In both his junior and senior seasons, Keth led the team to the NAIA national championship. In 1971, Keth was named to the 10-man all-time NAIA All-tournament team.

After stints as a high school coach and in the military, Keth became the Mules' head basketball coach in 1946 and remained in that position until 1961. During that time, Keth's teams went 159–167. Upon leaving this role, Keth became the head golf coach for the school until his death on the school's golf course on April 19, 1972.

Keth is a member of the University of Central Missouri Athletic Hall of Fame, the Missouri Sports Hall of Fame, the Mid-America Intercollegiate Athletics Association Hall of Fame and the NAIA Hall of Fame. Illinois Basketball Coaches Association Hall of Fame. Additionally, the Keth Memorial Golf Course and Pro Shop on the UCM campus is named after Keth. Earl Keth was the golf course architect opening in 1970. Earl Keth Played on many teams after college, willing IBAA National Basketball 1st Annual Tournament of Champions, Springfield Mo, 1947
