= 2014 NCAA Division II men's basketball tournament =

- Teams: 64
- Finals site: Ford Center, Evansville, Indiana
- Champions: Central Missouri Mules (2nd title)
- Runner-up: West Liberty Hilltoppers (1st title game)
- Semifinalists: Metro State Roadrunners (6th Final Four); Aiken Pacers (1st Final Four)
- Winning coach: Kim Anderson (1st title)
- MOP: Daylen Robinson (Central Missouri)

The 2014 NCAA Division II men's basketball tournament was a single-elimination tournament involving 64 teams that was played to determine the national champion of men's NCAA Division II college basketball as a culmination of the 2013–14 basketball season.

The eight regional winners met in the Elite Eight for the quarterfinal, semifinal, and championship rounds at the Ford Center in Evansville, Indiana. The championship game was played on March 29, 2014, and was aired nationally on CBS.

The Central Missouri Mules defeated the West Liberty Hilltoppers, 84–77, to win their second national championship and first since the 1984 NCAA Division II Tournament.

2014 NCAA Division II Men's sites - regionals (cyan) Elite Eight (red)

== Qualification and tournament format ==
The champions of 22 of the 24 Division II basketball conferences qualified automatically. The list of automatic qualifying conferences changed as follows from the 2013 tournament:

- The West Virginia Intercollegiate Athletic Conference (WVIAC) disbanded at the end of the 2012–13 school year, with most of the former members forming the Mountain East Conference (MEC) under a new charter. The MEC will not be eligible for an automatic berth until the 2016 tournament.
- The Great American Conference, which began competition in the 2011–12 school year, became eligible for an automatic berth.

In addition to the MEC, the Great Midwest Athletic Conference (G-MAC) was not eligible for an automatic berth. Although the G-MAC began conference competition in 2012–13, it was not officially accepted as a Division II conference until 2013–14, meaning that it will not receive an automatic berth until the 2016 tournament.

An additional 42 teams were selected as at-large participants by the selection committee. As in previous years, the first three rounds of the tournament were organized in regions comprising eight participants in groups of two or three conferences (two in the Atlantic and Central regions) with seeds assigned by the selection committee. The Elite Eight regional winners met ar one site for the quarterfinals, semifinals, and finals.

=== Automatic qualifiers ===
The following teams automatically qualified for the national tournament as the champions of their conference tournaments.

Team	Conference	Region
Cal State Stanislaus	CCAA	West
Philadelphia	CACC	East
Livingstone	CIAA	Atlantic
Limestone	Conference Carolinas	Southeast
Bridgeport	ECC	East
Harding	Great American	Central
Findlay	GLIAC	Midwest
Southern Indiana	GLVC	Midwest
Seattle Pacific	GNAC	West
North Alabama	Gulf South	South
Texas A&M International	Heartland	South Central
Tarleton State	Lone Star	South Central
Missouri Southern State	MIAA	Central
Southern Connecticut State	Northeast-10	East
Minnesota State Mankato	NSIC	Central
Chaminade	Pacific West	West
South Carolina–Aiken	Peach Belt	Southeast
East Stroudsburg	PSAC	Atlantic
Metro State	RMAC	South Central
Lincoln Memorial	SAC	Southeast
Tuskegee	SIAC	South
Florida Southern	Sunshine State	South

== Regionals ==
=== East - New Haven, Connecticut ===
Location: James Moore Fieldhouse Host: Southern Connecticut State University

First round Round of 64; March 15
1	Southern Connecticut State (27–2)	89
8	Bridgeport (18–10)	73
4	Franklin Pierce (20–7)	66
5	Philadelphia (25–6)	65
3	Saint Anselm (20–7)	73
6	Le Moyne (17–11)	62
2	New Haven (21–8)	57
7	Bloomfield (20–8)	59

Regional semifinal Round of 32; March 16
1	Southern Connecticut State	79
4	Franklin Pierce	77
3	Saint Anselm	82
7	Bloomfield	68

Regional Final; Sweet 16; March 18
1	Southern Connecticut State	78
3	Saint Anselm	72

=== Central - Mankato, Minnesota ===
Location: Taylor Center Host: Minnesota State University, Mankato

First round Round of 64; March 15
1	Minnesota State Mankato (29–4)	97
8	Harding (15–14)	56
4	Winona State (22–8)	77
5	Northwest Missouri State (26–7)	98
3	Missouri Southern State (24–5)	80
6	Fort Hays State (22–7)	69
2	Central Missouri (21–9)	56
7	Arkansas Tech (24–5)	44

Regional semifinal Round of 32; March 16
1	Minnesota State	66
5	Northwest Missouri State	71
3	Missouri Southern State	84
2	Central Missouri	94

Regional Final; Sweet 16; March 18
5	Northwest Missouri State	59
2	Central Missouri	60

=== South - Lakeland, Florida ===
Location: Jenkins Field House Host: Florida Southern College

First round Round of 64; March 15
1	Florida Southern (26–4)	95
8	Tuskegee (18–11)	98
4	North Alabama (22–9)	72
5	Tampa (20–9)	68
3	Delta State (24–6)	82
6	Barry (19–8)	77
2	Saint Leo (23–8)	75
7	West Alabama (17–10)	67

Regional semifinal Round of 32; March 16
8	Tuskegee	93
4	North Alabama	87
3	Delta State	70
2	Saint Leo	61

Regional Final; Sweet 16; March 18
8	Tuskegee	80
3	Delta State	59

=== South Central - Denver, Colorado ===
Location: Auraria Events Center Host: Metropolitan State University

First round Round of 64; March 15
1	Metro State (28–1)	76
8	UC Colorado Springs (21–8)	72
4	Colorado Mines (24–4)	41
5	St. Mary's (TX) (19–8)	19
3	Midwestern State (22–7)	72
6	UAFS (21–6)	66
2	Tarleton State (27–2)	92
7	Texas A&M–International (22–8)	56

Regional semifinal Round of 32; March 16
1	Metro State	86
4	Colorado Mines	82
3	Midwestern State	74
2	Tarleton State	68

Regional Final; Sweet 16; March 18
1	Metro State	78
3	Midwestern State	56

=== Midwest - Springfield, Missouri ===
Location: O'Reilly Family Event Center Host: Drury University

First round Round of 64; March 15
1	Drury (25–3)	69
8	Wisconsin–Parkside (23–6)	64
4	Findlay (24–5)	83
5	Lake Superior State (26–5)	88*
3	Southern Indiana (25–5)	70
6	Michigan Tech (22–7)	75
2	Indianapolis (23–4)	80
7	Bellarmine (23–7)	75

Regional semifinal Round of 32; March 16
1	Drury	79
5	Lake Superior State	61
6	Michigan Tech	82
2	Indianapolis	76

Regional Final; Sweet 16; March 18
1	Drury	71
6	Michigan Tech	57

=== Atlantic - East Stroudsburg, Pennsylvania ===
Location: Koehler Fieldhouse Host: East Stroudsburg University of Pennsylvania

First round Round of 64; March 15
1	East Stroudsburg (28–1)	99
8	Livingstone (21–7)	98
4	Charleston (WV) (21–8)	64
5	Gannon (19–9)	66
3	Indiana (PA) (23–4)	75
6	West Chester (20–9)	68
2	West Liberty (26–3)	88
7	Glenville State (18–10)	72

Regional semifinal Round of 32; March 16
1	East Stroudsburg	66
5	Gannon	58
3	Indiana (PA)	85
2	West Liberty	86

Regional Final; Sweet 16; March 18
1	East Stroudsburg	82
2	West Liberty	89

=== Southeast - Aiken, South Carolina ===
Location: USCA Convocation Center Host: University of South Carolina, Aiken

First round Round of 64; March 15
1	USC Aiken (29–3)	80
8	Limestone (21–8)	54
4	Anderson (SC) (22–9)	84
5	GRU Augusta (23–7)	86
3	Montevallo (24–5)	97
6	Georgia Southwestern (20–10)	88
2	Lincoln Memorial (27–2)	76
7	Carson–Newman (19–8)	65

Regional semifinal Round of 32; March 16
1	USC Aiken	78
5	GRU Augusta	58
3	Montevallo	98
2	Lincoln Memorial	86

Regional Final; Sweet 16; March 18
1	USC Aiken	84
3	Montevallo	73

=== West - San Bernardino, California ===
Location: James and Aerianthi Coussoulis Arena Host: California State University, San Bernardino

First round Round of 64; March 14
1	CSU San Bernardino (23–4)	79
8	Chaminade (19–12)	78
4	Chico State (22–7)	77
5	California Baptist (24–3)	71
3	Cal Poly Pomona (21–6)	73
6	Dixie State (21–6)	63
2	Seattle Pacific (26–5)	72
7	CSU Stanislaus (21–8)	80

Regional semifinal Round of 32; March 15
1	CSU San Bernardino	77
4	Chico State	94
3	Cal Poly Pomona	69
7	CSU Stanislaus	75

Regional Final; Sweet 16; March 17
4	Chico State	81
7	CSU Stanislaus	80

== Elite Eight – Evansville, Indiana ==
Location: Ford Center Host: University of Southern Indiana

National Quarterfinals; Elite Eight; Wednesday, March 26
E1	Southern Connecticut State	72
C2	Central Missouri	78
S8	Tuskegee	87
SC1	Metro State	106
MW1	Drury	75
A2	West Liberty	85
SE1	USC Aiken	85
W4	Chico State	70

National semifinals Final Four; Thursday, March 27
C2	Central Missouri	71
SC1	Metro State	69
A2	West Liberty	86
SE1	USC Aiken	83

National Championship; Saturday, March 29
C2	Central Missouri	84
A2	West Liberty	77

== All-tournament team ==
- Dillon Deck (Central Missouri)
- Shawn Dyer (West Liberty)
- Charles Hammork (Central Missouri)
- Cedric Harris (West Liberty)
- Daylen Robinson (Central Missouri)
