= Mike Dunlap =

American basketball coach (born 1957)

- Dunlap in 2021

Colorado Mesa Mavericks
- Title: Head coach
- League: RMAC

Personal information
- Born: May 27, 1957 (age 69) Fairbanks, Territory of Alaska, U.S.
- Listed height: 5 ft 10 in (1.78 m)

Career information
- High school: Lathrop (Fairbanks, Alaska)
- College: Los Angeles Pierce (1976–1978); Loyola Marymount (1978–1980)
- NBA draft: 1980: undrafted
- Position: Guard
- Coaching career: 1980–present

Career history

Coaching
- 1980–1985: Loyola Marymount (assistant)
- 1985–1986: Iowa (assistant)
- 1986–1989: USC (assistant)
- 1989–1994: Cal Lutheran
- 1994–1996: Adelaide 36ers
- 1997–2006: Metro State
- 2006–2008: Denver Nuggets (assistant)
- 2008–2009: Arizona (assistant)
- 2009–2010: Oregon (assistant)
- 2010–2012: St. John's (assistant)
- 2012–2013: Charlotte Bobcats
- 2014–2020: Loyola Marymount
- 2020–2023: Milwaukee Bucks (assistant)
- 2024–present: Colorado Mesa

Career highlights
- As assistant coach: NBA champion (2021)

Michael Gregory Dunlap (born May 27, 1957) is an American professional basketball coach who is the head coach for the Colorado Mesa Mavericks men's basketball team. He is the former head coach of the National Basketball Association's Charlotte Bobcats, and also worked as an assistant coach for the Milwaukee Bucks during their most recent NBA championship.

== Career ==
Dunlap attended Lathrop High School in Fairbanks, Alaska, where he played basketball and baseball. He played as a third baseman for the Alaska Goldpanners of Fairbanks in 1976. Dunlap became the first basketball player from Alaska to finish their collegiate career at an NCAA Division I school when he graduated from Loyola Marymount University as a member of the Lions basketball team in 1980.

Dunlap served three seasons in Australia (1994–1996) as head coach of the Adelaide 36ers in the National Basketball League. Dunlap was successful in taking the team to the NBL Grand Final in 1994 against the North Melbourne Giants and the semi-finals in 1995 and 1996. Over his three season in Adelaide Dunlap compiled a 59–36 record before returning to the USA just weeks before the 1997 season following the sudden death of his father. Dunlap is credited as the coach who kick-started the NBL career of the 36ers all-time leading home grown player Brett Maher.

He served as head coach at Metro State in Denver (1997–2006). As the leader of the Metro State Roadrunners Dunlap led the program to 2 National Championships in the 2000 and 2002 seasons. As the Architect of the greatest years in the Roadrunner history he was named The National Association of Basketball Coaches Coach of the year in 2000 and 2002. He was assistant coach for the Denver Nuggets (2006–2008). He served as associate head coach at the University of Arizona (2008–2009) and the University of Oregon (2009–2010), and was interim head coach and associate head coach at St. John's University (2010–2012).

In the 2011–12 NBA season the Charlotte Bobcats record was an NBA worst ever 7–59. Dunlap joined the team on June 20, 2012. In the early part of the 2012–13 season, the Bobcats had a 7–5 record, with Charlotte matching its win total from the previous season. However, at that point they suffered many injuries and played many young players. They ultimately finished 21–61. Dunlap became the only coach in NBA history to triple a team's win total from the previous season. On April 23, 2013, the Bobcats announced that Dunlap would not be returning as coach.

Dunlap joined Loyola Marymount as head coach in 2014. During his tenure at Loyola Marymount, Dunlap helped guide steady growth in the Lions from an 8–23 team in the 2014–15 season to 15–15 by 2016–17. In the 2018–19 season, Dunlap led the lions to a 22-win season. They were crowned the champions of the Jamaica Classic, where they upset Georgetown University. The 2018–2019 season culminated in an appearance in the 2019 College Basketball Invitational. This is the third-best record in the history of the program. With a very impressive group of returning players and a good incoming recruiting class, the 2019–20 season appeared to be bright. Season-ending injuries to 2 starters and a tragedy in another starter's family made Dunlap and the Lions play short-handed during the entire 2019–20 season. LMU and Dunlap agreed to part ways after six seasons on March 8, 2020. Dunlap finished his career at his alma mater with 81 total wins, which is fifth-most all-time in program history.

On November 17, 2020, Dunlap was hired as an assistant coach by the Milwaukee Bucks. Dunlap won his first championship when the Bucks defeated the Phoenix Suns in 6 games in the 2021 NBA Finals. He departed the team when Adrian Griffin replaced Mike Budenholzer as head coach and hired a new coaching staff.

On April 15, 2024, Dunlap was hired as head coach of the Colorado Mesa Mavericks men's basketball team.

== Coaching record ==
=== NBA ===
Legend
Regular season	G	Games coached	W	Games won	L	Games lost	W–L %	Win–loss %
Playoffs	PG	Playoff games	PW	Playoff wins	PL	Playoff losses	PW–L %	Playoff win–loss %

Team	Year	G	W	L	W–L%	Finish	PG	PW	PL	PW–L%	Result
Charlotte	2012–13	82	21	61	.256	4th in Southeast	—	—	—	—	Missed Playoffs
Career		82	21	61	.256		—	—	—	—	

=== NBL ===
Legend
Regular season	G	Games coached	W	Games won	L	Games lost	W–L %	Win–loss %
Playoffs	PG	Playoff games	PW	Playoff wins	PL	Playoff losses	PW–L %	Playoff win–loss %

Team	Year	G	W	L	W–L%	Finish	PG	PW	PL	PW–L%	Result
Adelaide 36ers	1994	26	18	8	.692	4th	7	4	3	.571	Grand Finalist
Adelaide 36ers	1995	26	17	9	.654	4th	5	2	3	.400	Semi-finals
Adelaide 36ers	1996	26	16	10	.615	6th	5	2	3	.400	Semi-finals
Career		78	51	27	.654		17	8	9	.471	

=== College ===
Record table
Season	Team	Overall	Conference	Standing	Postseason
Cal Lutheran Kingsmen (NCAA Division II independent) (1989–1991)
1989–90	Cal Lutheran	5–21			
1990–91	Cal Lutheran	14–12			
Cal Lutheran Kingsmen (Southern California Intercollegiate Athletic Conference) (1991–1994)
1991–92	Cal Lutheran	16–12	11–3	1st	NCAA D-III Sectional
1992–93	Cal Lutheran	20–7	12–2	T–1st	NCAA D-III Regional
1993–94	Cal Lutheran	25–3	12–2	1st	NCAA D-III Sectional
Cal Lutheran:		80–55 (.593)	35–7 (.833)		
Metro State Roadrunners (Rocky Mountain Athletic Conference) (1997–2006)
1997–98	Metro State	25–5	16–3	1st (East)	NCAA D-II Tournament
1998–99	Metro State	28–6	15–4	T–1st (East)	NCAA D-II Runner–Up
1999–00	Metro State	33–4	17–2	1st (East)	NCAA D-II Champion
2000–01	Metro State	23–7	14–5	3rd (East)	NCAA D-II First Round
2001–02	Metro State	29–6	16–3	2nd (East)	NCAA D-II Champion
2002–03	Metro State	28–5	16–3	2nd (East)	NCAA D-II Second Round
2003–04	Metro State	32–3	19–0	1st (East)	NCAA D-II Final Four
2004–05	Metro State	29–4	16–3	T–1st (East)	NCAA D-II Elite Eight
2005–06	Metro State	21–10	13–6	3rd (East)	NCAA D-II first round
Metro State:		248–50 (.832)	142–29 (.830)		
Loyola Marymount Lions (West Coast Conference) (2014–2020)
2014–15	Loyola Marymount	8–23	4–14	T–9th	
2015–16	Loyola Marymount	14–17	6–12	T–7th	
2016–17	Loyola Marymount	15–15	8–10	6th	
2017–18	Loyola Marymount	11–20	5–13	8th	
2018–19	Loyola Marymount	22–12	8–8	T–5th	CBI semifinal
2019–20	Loyola Marymount	11–21	4–12	8th	Postseason not held
Loyola Marymount:		81–108 (.429)	35–69 (.337)		
Colorado Mesa Mavericks (Rocky Mountain Athletic Conference) (2024–2026)
2024-25	Colorado Mesa	19-10	13–7	3rd	
2025-26	Colorado Mesa	21-11	15–5	2nd	NCAA D-II First Round
Colorado Mesa:		40–21 (.656)	28–12 (.700)		
Total:		449–234 (.657)			
National champion Postseason invitational champion Conference regular season champion Conference regular season and conference tournament champion Division regular season champion Division regular season and conference tournament champion Conference tournament champion
