= Willard N. Greim =

American basketball administrator and coach

Willard Nicholas Greim (August 7, 1890 – June 27, 1982) was an American basketball administrator and coach. He coached the University of Central Missouri basketball team in 1919–1923.

In 1924, Denver Public Schools offered him the newly created position of director of health, education, and athletics. There, he added swimming, golf, tennis, and gymnastics to the curriculum, and instituted after-school and summer sports programs. He remained in this position until his mandatory retirement in 1955.

Beginning in 1932, he served in several positions with the Amateur Athletic Union, including a period as a president of the AAU (1944–1947). He led the Joint Basketball Rules Committee that adopted a unified standard of basketball rules in the US in 1947. He served as a president of the FIBA from 1948 to 1960.

In 1955, he was credited with setting up an operating contract that saved the Denver Zoo from bankruptcy, and allowed for its expansion and improvement. He served as the president of the board of trustees of the zoo from 1970 to 1976.

In 1966, he was inducted into the Colorado Sports Hall of Fame, and in 2007, he was enshrined as a contributor in the FIBA Hall of Fame.
