= MSU Denver Roadrunners men's basketball =

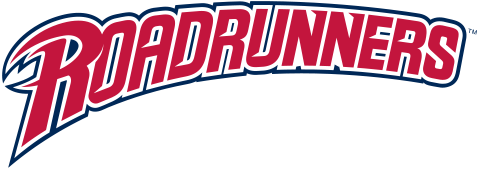
- University: Metropolitan State University of Denver
- First season: 1968
- Location: Denver, Colorado
- Arena: Auraria Event Center (capacity: 2,300)
- Conference: Rocky Mountain Athletic Conference
- Nickname: Roadrunners
- Colors: Navy blue and red

NCAA Division I tournament champions
- 2000, 2002
Other NCAA Division I tournament results
Runner-up	1999, 2013
Final Four	1999, 2000, 2002, 2004, 2013, 2014
Elite Eight	1999, 2000, 2002, 2004, 2005, 2012, 2013, 2014
Sweet Sixteen	1998, 1999, 2000, 2002, 2003, 2004, 2005, 2012, 2013, 2014
Appearances	1990, 1991, 1998, 1999, 2000, 2001, 2002, 2003, 2004, 2005, 2006, 2007, 2009, 2010, 2011, 2012, 2013, 2014, 2015

Conference tournament champions
- Rocky Mountain Athletic Conference; 1999, 2000, 2001, 2003, 2004, 2005, 2007, 2009, 2010, 2013, 2014

Conference regular-season champions
- Great Northwest Conference; 1990 Colorado Athletic Conference; 1991, 1992 Rocky Mountain Athletic Conference; 1998, 2000, 2004, 2005, 2007, 2009, 2013, 2014, 2015

The MSU Denver men's basketball team, or Roadrunners, represents Metropolitan State University of Denver in Denver, Colorado.

== Postseason results ==
=== National championships ===
Year	Coach	Rival	Score	Record
2000	Mike Dunlap	Kentucky Wesleyan	97–79	33–4
2002	Mike Dunlap	Kentucky Wesleyan	80–72	29–6
National Championships			2	

=== 2000 NCAA tournament results ===
Round	Rival	Score
Round #1	North Dakota	82–58
Sweet 16	#19 Wayne State (NE)	84–72
Elite 8	St. Anselm	81–61
Final 4	#5 Missouri Southern State	75–74
Championship	#2 Kentucky Wesleyan	97–79

=== 2002 NCAA tournament results ===
Round	Rival	Score
Round #1	Minnesota-Duluth	66–61
Round #2	#13 Nebraska–Kearney	59–51
Sweet 16	at #17 South Dakota State	87–86
Elite 8	#10 Cal State San Bernardino	65–48
Final 4	#16 Indiana (PA)	82–52
Championship	#1 Kentucky Wesleyan	80–72

=== Final Four history ===
Year	Resul
1999	Finalist
2000	Champion
2002	Champion
2004	Semifinalist
2013	Finalist
2014	Semifinalist

== Season-by-season results ==
Season	Coach	Overall	Conference	Standing	Postseason
1968–69	Bill Mumma	–			
1969–70	James Bryant	0–25			
1970–71	James Bryant	–			
1971–72	James Bryant	0–24			
1972–73	James Bryant	6–17			
1973–74	Wayne Monson/Jim Jarvis	–			
1974–75	Erv Bratcher	7–14			
1975–76	Gene Lee	–			
1976–77	Gene Lee	–			
1977–78	Gene Lee/Marc Rabinoff	0–24			
No Basketball (1978–1984)
1984–85	Bob Ligouri	13–13			
1985–86	Bob Hull	12–12			
Great Northwest Conference (1986–1990)
1986–87	Bob Hull	16–12	5–5		
1987–88	Bob Hull	17–11	5–5		
1988–89	Bob Hull	20–8	7–5		
1989–90	Bob Hull	28–4	8–2	1st	NCAA Tournament
Colorado Athletic Conference (1990–1996)
1990–91	Bob Hull	23–8	8–2	1st	NCAA Tournament
1991–92	Bob Hull	17–11	10–2	1st	
1992–93	Bob Hull	16–12	8–4	2nd	
1993–94	Joe Strain	14–13	5–7	5th	
1994–95	Charles Bradley	6–21	4–6	3rd	
1995–96	Charles Bradley	17–9	6–4	2nd	
Rocky Mountain Athletic Conference (1996–present)
1996–97	Charles Bradley	13–13	9–10	3rd – East	
1997–98	Mike Dunlap	25–5	16–3	1st – East	NCAA Tournament
1998–99	Mike Dunlap	28–6	15–4	1st – East	NCAA Runner Up
1999–00	Mike Dunlap	33–4	17–2	1st – East	NCAA National Champions
2000–01	Mike Dunlap	23–7	14–5	3rd – East	NCAA Tournament
2001–02	Mike Dunlap	29–6	16–3	2nd – East	NCAA National Champions
2002–03	Mike Dunlap	28–5	16–3	2nd – East	NCAA Tournament
2003–04	Mike Dunlap	32–3	19–0	1st – East	NCAA Final Four
2004–05	Mike Dunlap	29–4	16–3	1st – East	NCAA Elite Eight
2005–06	Mike Dunlap	21–10	13–6	3rd – East	NCAA Tournament
2006–07	Brannon Hays	28–4	17–2	1st – East	NCAA Tournament
2007–08	Brannon Hays	19–12	12–7	3rd – East	
2008–09	Brannon Hays	27–4	18–1	1st – East	NCAA Tournament
2009–10	Brannon Hays	24–7	14–5	1st – East (Co-Champions)	NCAA Tournament
2010–11	Derrick Clark	22–8	17–5	2nd	NCAA Tournament
2011–12	Derrick Clark	25–7	17–5	2nd	NCAA Elite Eight
2012–13	Derrick Clark	32–3	20–2	1st	NCAA Runner Up
2013–14	Derrick Clark	32–2	22–0	1st	NCAA Final Four
2014–15	Derrick Clark	26–6	19–3	1st	NCAA Tournament
2015–16	Derrick Clark	19–11	16–6	1st - Rocky (Co-Champions)	
2016–17	Derrick Clark	17–13	12–10	6th	
2017–18	Michael Bahl	15–14	14–8	T–5th	
2018–19	Michael Bahl	12–14	10–12	T–9th	
2019–20	Michael Bahl	12–16	8–14	12th	
2020–21	Michael Bahl	9–8	9–6	4th	
2021–22	Michael Bahl	17–12	11–11	7th	
2022–23	Dan Ficke	12–17	9–13	T–7th	
2023–24	Dan Ficke	19–10	13–9	5th	
2024–25	Dan Ficke	19–10	13–7	T–3rd	
2025–26	Dan Ficke	10–18	8–12	T–9th	
Total:					
National champion Postseason invitational champion Conference regular season champion Conference regular season and conference tournament champion Division regular season champion Division regular season and conference tournament champion Conference tournament champion

== NIT ==
Metro State was selected for the 2013 NIT Season Tip-Off, their opponent is the Rhode Island Rams. The regional is being played at the McKale Center in Tucson, AZ. Home of the Arizona Wildcats. Metro State became the second Division II team to be selected in the NIT Season Tip-Off.

Date, Time, TV	Rank	Rival	Score	Record	Host
Exhibition
11/18/2013*; 6:00 pm, N/A	No. 1	vs. Rhode Island; NIT Season Tip-Off, First Round	W 66–63	0–1	McKale Center (0); Tucson, AZ
11/19/2013*; 6:00 pm, N/A	No. 1	vs. Fairleigh Dickinson; NIT Season Tip-Off, West Consolation	W 87–76	1–1	McKale Center (0); Tucson, AZ
11/25/2013*; 5:30 pm, N/A	No. 1	at Elon; NIT Season Tip-Off, Consolation round	W 75–74	2–1	Alumni Gym (Elon University) (844); Elon, NC
11/26/2013*; 3:00 pm, N/A	No. 1	vs. Canisius; NIT Season Tip-Off, Consolation round	W 83–69	3–1	Alumni Gym (Elon University) (577); Elon, NC
*Non-conference game. ^{#}Rankings from AP Poll. (#) Tournament seedings in parentheses. All times are in Mountain Standard Time.

Metro State becomes first DII school to win twice at NIT Season Tip-Off

== Roadrunners in the pros ==
=== Active ===
- (United States) Steven Emory
- (United States) Brandon Jefferson
- (Australia) Nick Kay
- (Australia) Luke Kendall
- (United States) C. J. Massingale
- (Australia) Mitch McCarron
- (Austria) Ben Ortner
- (Australia) Hayden Smith
- (Lithuania) Benas Veikalas
- (Australia) Jesse Wagstaff

=== Retired ===
- (Australia) David Barlow
- (Democratic Republic of the Congo) Patrick Mutombo
- (Australia) Drew Williamson
- (Australia) Mark Worthington

== Roadrunner Olympians ==
Name	Games
(Australia) David Barlow	2008 Summer Olympics, 2012 Summer Olympics
(Australia) Mark Worthington	2008 Summer Olympics, 2012 Summer Olympics
(Australia) Nick Kay	2020 Summer Olympics
