= 2013 NCAA Division II men's basketball tournament =

Men's basketball tournament

- Teams: 64
- Finals site: , Louisville, Kentucky & Atlanta, Georgia
- Champions: Drury Panthers (1st title)
- Runner-up: Metro State Roadrunners (4th title game)
- Semifinalists: West Liberty Hilltoppers (2nd Final Four); Western Washington Vikings (3rd Final Four)
- Winning coach: Steve Hesser
- MOP: Alex Hall (Drury)
- Attendance: TBD

The 2013 NCAA Division II men's basketball tournament involved 64 schools playing in a single-elimination tournament to determine the national champion of men's NCAA Division II college basketball as a culmination of the 2012–13 basketball season.

The eight regional winners met at the Elite Eight for the quarterfinal and semifinal rounds held at Freedom Hall in Louisville, Kentucky. As part of the festivities surrounding the 75th edition of the NCAA tournament, the championship game was played at Philips Arena in Atlanta on April 7, 2013.

2013 NCAA Division II Men's sites - regionals (cyan) Elite Eight (red)

== Qualification and tournament format ==
The champions of 22 of the 24 Division II basketball conferences qualified automatically. The Great Midwest Athletic Conference, in its first season of operation, and the Great American Conference, in its second season, were not eligible for automatic berths. (The Great American became eligible for an automatic berth with the 2014 tournament. The G-MAC did not receive an automatic berth until 2016 because it was not officially recognized as a D-II conference until 2013–14.) An additional 42 teams were selected as at-large participants by the selection committee. As in previous years, the first three rounds of the tournament were organized in regions comprising eight participants in groups of two or three conferences (two in the Central and Midwest regions) with seeds assigned by the selection committee.

Traditionally, the Elite Eight regional winners meet in one site for the quarterfinals, semifinals, and finals. However, as noted above, this was changed for 2013 only, with the quarterfinals and semifinals held in Louisville and the final game in Atlanta.

This was the final tournament for the West Virginia Intercollegiate Athletic Conference, which disbanded at the end of the 2012–13 school year, with most of the members forming the new Mountain East Conference.

=== Automatic qualifiers ===
The following teams automatically qualified for the national tournament as the champions of their conference tournaments:

Team	Conference	Region
Cal Poly Pomona	CCAA	West
Bloomfield	CACC	East
Bowie State	CIAA	Atlantic
Belmont Abbey	Conference Carolinas	Southeast
Bridgeport	ECC	East
Findlay	GLIAC	Midwest
Drury	GLVC	Midwest
Seattle Pacific	GNAC	West
Christian Brothers	Gulf South	South
St. Mary's (Texas)	Heartland	South Central
Tarleton State	Lone Star	South Central
Central Missouri	MIAA	Central
Southern New Hampshire	Northeast-10	East
Minnesota State–Mankato	NSIC	Central
Dixie State	Pacific West	West
USC Aiken	Peach Belt	Southeast
Indiana (PA)	PSAC	Atlantic
Metro State	RMAC	South Central
Wingate	SAC	Southeast
Benedict	SIAC	South
Florida Southern	Sunshine State	South
West Liberty	WVIAC	Atlantic

== Regionals ==
=== East - Rindge, New Hampshire ===
Location: Franklin Pierce Fieldhouse Host: Franklin Pierce University

First round Round of 64; March 16
1	Franklin Pierce (21–8)	90
8	Bloomfield (17–12)	78
4	New Haven (19–8)	73
5	Dominican (NY) (22–6)	66
3	Assumption (20–7)	73
6	Southern New Hampshire (19–10)	65
2	Saint Anselm (23–5)	66
7	Bridgeport (21–9)	77

Regional semifinal Round of 32; March 17
1	Franklin Pierce	80
4	New Haven	63
3	Assumption	56
7	Bridgeport	58

Regional Final; Sweet 16; March 19
1	Franklin Pierce	57
7	Bridgeport	52

=== South Central - Denver, Colorado ===
Location: Auraria Events Center Host: Metropolitan State University

First round Round of 64; March 16
1	Metro State (27–2)	76
8	Tarleton State (20–9)	65
4	Midwestern State (21–8)	81
5	Newman (20–7)	60
3	Fort Lewis (21–7)	95
6	Adams State (20–8)	73
2	St. Mary's (TX) (21–7)	75
7	Cameron (18–8)	57

Regional semifinal Round of 32; March 17
1	Metro State	66
4	Midwestern State	60
3	Fort Lewis	50
2	St. Mary's (TX)	62

Regional Final; Sweet 16; March 19
1	Metro State	78
2	St. Mary's (TX)	70

=== Central - Mankato, Minnesota ===
Location: Taylor Center Host: Minnesota State University, Mankato

First round Round of 64; March 16
1	Minnesota State–Mankato (26–4)	81
8	Arkansas Tech (18–11)	65
4	Central Missouri (22–7)	71
5	Harding (21–9)	75
3	Augustana (SD) (21–8)	79
6	Upper Iowa (20–11)	65
2	Winona State (24–7)	70
7	Northeastern State (19–8)	57

Regional semifinal Round of 32; March 17
1	Minnesota State–Mankato	86
5	Harding	65
3	Augustana (SD)	65
2	Winona State	77

Regional Final; Sweet 16; March 19
1	Minnesota State–Mankato	73
2	Winona State	76

=== Atlantic - West Liberty, West Virginia ===
Location: Academic, Sports, and Recreation Complex Host: West Liberty University

First round Round of 64; March 16
1	West Liberty (30–1)	114
8	Bowie State (16–13)	82
4	Fairmont State (22–8)	91
5	Livingstone (22–6)	73
3	Indiana (PA) (24–5)	76
6	East Stroudsburg (22–6)	68
2	Winston-Salem (21–6)	67
7	Slippery Rock (22–8)	69

Regional semifinal Round of 32; March 17
1	West Liberty	100
4	Fairmont State	77
3	Indiana (PA)	53
7	Slippery Rock	50

Regional Final; Sweet 16; March 19
1	West Liberty	86
3	Indiana (PA)	63

=== South - Lakeland, Florida ===
Location: Jenkins Field House Host: Florida Southern College

First round Round of 64; March 16
1	Florida Southern (24–5)	94
8	North Alabama (19–8)	80
4	Saint Leo (21–7)	59
5	Rollins (19–10)	53
3	Eckerd (20–7)	65
6	Benedict (23–6)	68
2	Alabama–Huntsville (23–5)	60
7	Christian Brothers (21–8)	58

Regional semifinal Round of 32; March 17
1	Florida Southern	84
4	Saint Leo	65
6	Benedict	60
2	Alabama–Huntsville	64

Regional Final; Sweet 16; March 19
1	Florida Southern	90
2	Alabama–Huntsville	88

=== West - Bellingham, Washington ===
Location: Sam Carver Gymnasium Host: Western Washington University

First round Round of 64; March 15
1	Western Washington (27–2)	102
8	Chaminade (20–9)	87
4	Dixie State (22–6)	69
5	CSU San Bernardino (22–6)	75
3	Seattle Pacific (25–3)	85
6	Grand Canyon (23–7)	59
2	Cal Poly Pomona (27–2)	69
7	Chico State (19–10)	61

Regional semifinal Round of 32; March 18
1	Western Washington	86
5	CSU San Bernardino	77
3	Seattle Pacific	67
2	Cal Poly Pomona	54

Regional Final; Sweet 16; March 19
1	Western Washington	62
3	Seattle Pacific	58

All-West Region team: Kwame Alexander (F/CSU San Bernardino) Jobi Wall (F/Seattle Pacific) Patrick Simon (F/Seattle Pacific) John Allen (G/Western Washington) Region Most Outstanding Player Richard Woodworth (G/Western Washington)

=== Midwest - Springfield, Missouri ===
Location: O'Reilly Family Event Center Host: Drury University

First round Round of 64; March 16
1	Drury (25–4)	89
8	Findlay (22–7)	77
4	Michigan Tech (20–8)	86
5	UW–Parkside (20–8)	75
3	Bellarmine (22–7)	67
6	Indianapolis (20–8)	61
2	Southern Indiana (22–7)	79
7	Wayne State (MI) (17–9)	70

Regional semifinal Round of 32; March 17
1	Drury	76
4	Michigan Tech	62
3	Bellarmine	78
2	Southern Indiana	55

Regional Final; Sweet 16; March 19
1	Drury	67
3	Bellarmine	61

=== Southeast - Aiken, South Carolina ===
Location: USCA Convocation Center Host: University of South Carolina, Aiken

First round Round of 64; March 16
1	USC–Aiken (22–7)	94
8	Belmont Abbey (22–9)	76
4	Wingate (21–8)	65
5	Limestone (21–8)	60
3	Barton (21–7)	81
6	Montevallo (20–9)	73
2	Lincoln Memorial (24–5)	82
7	UNC Pembroke (22–9)	80

Regional semifinal Round of 32; March 17
1	USC–Aiken	69
4	Wingate	57
3	Barton	76
2	Lincoln Memorial	61

Regional Final; Sweet 16; March 19
1	USC–Aiken	82
3	Barton	75

== Elite Eight – Louisville, Kentucky and Atlanta, Georgia ==
Venues: Freedom Hall (Louisville), Philips Arena (Atlanta)

National Quarterfinals; Elite Eight; Louisville - Thursday, March 28
E1	Franklin Pierce	65
SC1	Metro State	78
C2	Winona State	84
A1	West Liberty	110
S1	Florida Southern	82
W1	Western Washington	96
MW1	Drury	84
SE1	USC–Aiken	75

National semifinals Final Four; Louisville - Saturday, March 30
SC1	Metro State	83
A1	West Liberty	76
W1	Western Washington	97
MW1	Drury	107

National Championship; Atlanta - Sunday, April 7
SC1	Metro State	73
MW1	Drury	74

== All-tournament team ==
- Alex Hall (Drury)
- Brandon Jefferson (Metropolitan State)
- Brandon Lockhart (Drury)
- Mitch McCarron (Metropolitan State)
- Jonathan Morse (Metropolitan State)
