= Brian Schwenke =

American football player (born 1991)

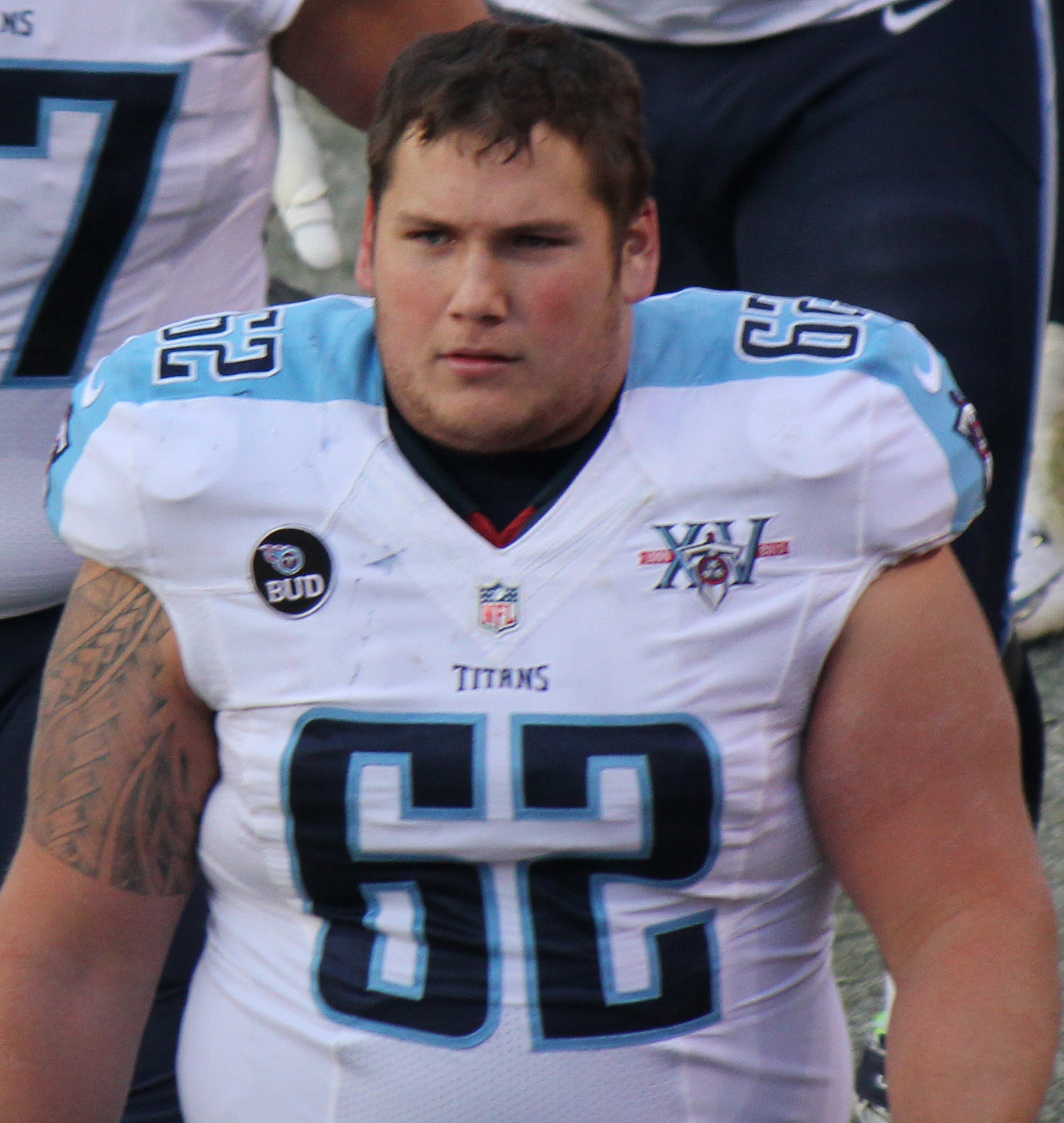
- Schwenke with the Tennessee Titans in 2013

No. 62, 63
- Position: Center

Personal information
- Born: March 22, 1991 (age 35); Waukegan, Illinois, U.S.
- Listed height: 6 ft 3 in (1.91 m)
- Listed weight: 318 lb (144 kg)

Career information
- High school: Oceanside (Oceanside, California)
- College: California
- NFL draft: 2013: 4th round, 107th overall pick

Career history
- Tennessee Titans (2013–2016); Indianapolis Colts (2017)*; Tennessee Titans (2017); New England Patriots (2018)
- * Offseason or practice squad member only

Awards and highlights
- Super Bowl champion (LIII); First-team All-Pac-12 (2012)

Career NFL statistics
- Games played: 60
- Games started: 30
- Stats at Pro Football Reference

Brian Max Schwenke Jr. (/ˈʃwæŋki/ SHWANK-ee; born March 22, 1991) is an American former professional football player who was a center in the National Football League (NFL). He played college football for the California Golden Bears and was selected by the Tennessee Titans in the fourth round of the 2013 NFL draft.

After four seasons with the Titans, Schwenke had an offseason stint with the Indianapolis Colts in 2017 before returning to the Titans for the regular season. He spent the 2018 season as a backup for the New England Patriots, winning Super Bowl LIII. Despite re-signing with the Patriots after the conclusion of the 2018 season, he later retired during the 2019 offseason.

== Early life ==
Schwenke was born in Waukegan, Illinois and is of Samoan descent. Due to his father’s job in the Navy, he grew up in Hawaii and later San Diego. Schwenke attended Oceanside High School, where he played for the Oceanside Pirates high school football team. Schwenke was teammates with lineman Larry Warford, who attended Oceanside during his freshman, and sophomore year, Sam Brenner offensive lineman and with quarterback Jordan Wynn. Regarded as a three-star recruit by Rivals.com, Schwenke was rated as the No. 44 offensive guard prospect in his class.

== College career ==
While attending the University of California, Berkeley, Schwenke played for the California Golden Bears from 2009 to 2012. He played in 48 of 50 possible games during his four seasons with the program, starting 36 of 37 games over his final three seasons. He started his career at guard, making 16 starts at left guard and then eight at right guard, before being moved to center during his senior year. He started 12 games and earned first-team All-Pac-12 Conference honors.

== Professional career ==
Pre-draft measurables
Height	Weight	Arm length	Hand span	40-yard dash	20-yard shuttle	Three-cone drill	Vertical jump	Broad jump	Bench press
6 ft 3 in (1.91 m)	314 lb (142 kg)	32 in (0.81 m)	10 1/4 in (0.26 m)	4.99 s	4.74 s	7.31 s	26 1/2 in (0.67 m)	9 ft 0 in (2.74 m)	31 reps
All values from NFL Combine

=== Tennessee Titans (first stint) ===
The Tennessee Titans chose Schwenke in the fourth round, with the 107th overall pick, of the 2013 NFL draft. In four years as a member of the Titans, Schwenke played in 41 games and started 28 of them.

=== Indianapolis Colts ===
On March 13, 2017, Schwenke signed with the Indianapolis Colts. He was released by the Colts on September 3, 2017.

=== Tennessee Titans (second stint) ===
On September 4, 2017, Schwenke signed with the Titans. He played in all 16 games, starting two at left guard in place of an injured Quinton Spain.

=== New England Patriots ===
On July 31, 2018, Schwenke signed with the New England Patriots. He was released on September 1, 2018, but was re-signed three days later. He took snaps in three games, but did not start any of them; he was placed on injured reserve on November 6, 2018, with a foot injury. The Patriots reached Super Bowl LIII where they defeated the Los Angeles Rams 13-3, earning Schwenke a Super Bowl ring.

On February 13, 2019, Schwenke signed a one-year contract extension with the Patriots. On July 24, 2019, the Patriots placed Schwenke on the reserve/retired list.

=== Post-Football Career ===
Now, Schwenke is an Investment Banking Vice President working for Pinnacle Financial Partners in Nashville, Tennessee. He has been working there since May of 2023.
