= Larry Warford =

American football player (born 1991)

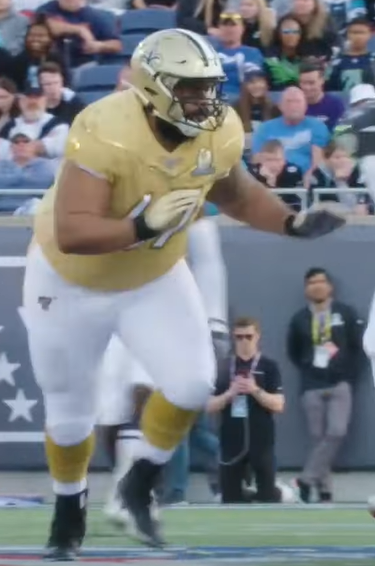
- Warford at the 2020 Pro Bowl

No. 67, 75
- Position: Guard

Personal information
- Born: June 18, 1991 (age 35); San Diego, California, U.S.
- Listed height: 6 ft 3 in (1.91 m)
- Listed weight: 317 lb (144 kg)

Career information
- High school: Madison Central (Richmond, Kentucky)
- College: Kentucky (2009–2012)
- NFL draft: 2013: 3rd round, 65th overall pick

Career history
- Detroit Lions (2013–2016); New Orleans Saints (2017–2019)

Awards and highlights
- 3× Pro Bowl (2017–2019); PFWA All-Rookie Team (2013); First-team All-SEC (2012); 2× Second-team All-SEC (2010, 2011)

Career NFL statistics
- Games played: 101
- Games started: 101
- Stats at Pro Football Reference

Lawrence Daniel Warford III (born June 18, 1991) is an American former professional football player who was a guard in the National Football League (NFL). He played college football for the Kentucky Wildcats and was selected by the Detroit Lions in the third round of the 2013 NFL draft. He made the Pro Bowl in all three of his seasons with the New Orleans Saints.

== Early life ==
Born in San Diego, California to an African American father and a Samoan mother, Warford attended Oceanside High School during his freshman and sophomore year. By his sophomore year, he had earned a starting job as offensive tackle, protecting quarterback Jordan Wynn. One of his teammates on the offensive line was Brian Schwenke. After Warford's father retired from the United States Navy, his family moved to Richmond, Kentucky, where he attended Madison Central High School and became a two-year all-state honoree. In his senior year, he was named a first-team all-state selection by the Associated Press and Louisville Courier-Journal.

Regarded as a three-star recruit by Rivals.com, Warford was listed as the No. 30 guard prospect in his class, behind Chance Warmack (No. 20) and Alvin Bailey (No. 27). Warford chose Kentucky over Auburn and Louisville.

== College career ==
Warford attended the University of Kentucky, where he played for the Kentucky Wildcats football team from 2009 to 2012. He started his career mostly as a reserve at right guard, appearing in 10 games, before earning a starting spot his sophomore year. He would go on to start 37 consecutive games for the Wildcats, and earned second-team All-Southeastern Conference (SEC) honors in three consecutive seasons.

== Professional career ==
Pre-draft measurables
| Height | Weight | Arm length | Hand span | 40-yard dash | 10-yard split | 20-yard split | 20-yard shuttle | Three-cone drill | Vertical jump | Broad jump | Bench press | Wonderlic |
|---|---|---|---|---|---|---|---|---|---|---|---|---|
| 6 ft 3 in (1.91 m) | 332 lb (151 kg) | 33 3/8 in (0.85 m) | 9 1/2 in (0.24 m) | 5.58 s | 1.85 s | 3.14 s | 5.10 s | 7.78 s | 22 1/2 in (0.57 m) | 8 ft 0 in (2.44 m) | 28 reps | 27 |
All values from NFL Combine

=== Detroit Lions ===
Warford was selected by the Detroit Lions in the third round, with the 65th overall pick, of the 2013 NFL draft. He signed his rookie contract with the Lions on May 9, 2013; financial terms were not disclosed.

In his rookie season, Warford became an immediate starter at right guard for the Lions, and he did not give up a sack the entire 2013 season. He was named Pro Football Focus's Rookie of the Year. He was named the 2013 recipient of the Detroit Lions/Detroit Sports Broadcasters Association Rookie of the Year Award. Warford started all 16 regular-season games as a rookie. He was named to the PFWA All-Rookie Team.

=== New Orleans Saints ===
On March 9, 2017, Warford signed a four-year, $34 million contract with the New Orleans Saints. In his first season in New Orleans, he started 14 games at right guard, missing two games due to an abdomen injury, on his way to his first Pro Bowl.

In 2018, Warford started 15 games and made his second straight Pro Bowl appearance.

In 2019, Warford was selected to his third straight Pro Bowl.

On May 8, 2020, Warford was released by the Saints after three seasons. He decided to opt out of the 2020 season due to the COVID-19 pandemic on July 28.
