= Jordan Fee =

American basketball coach

Current position
- Title: Head Coach
- Team: Lamar
- Conference: Southland
- Record: 2–1 (.667)

Playing career
- 2008–2010: Detroit Mercy
- 2010–2012: West Liberty

Coaching career (HC unless noted)
- 2012–2013: West Liberty (student assistant)
- 2013–2014: Clarion (graduate assistant)
- 2014–2015: Detroit Mercy (graduate assistant)
- 2015–2022: Nova Southeastern (assistant)
- 2022–2023: Nova Southeastern (associate HC)
- 2023–2024: Gannon
- 2024–2025: Florida Atlantic (assistant)
- 2025–2026: Florida Atlantic (associate HC)
- 2026–present: Lamar

Head coaching record
- Overall: 34–4 (.895)
- Tournaments: 3–1 (NCAA Division II)

Accomplishments and honors

Championships
- PSAC West (2024); PSAC tournament (2024)

Awards
- Clarence Gaines Award (2024); PSAC West Coach of the Year (2024)

Jordan Fee is an American college basketball coach who is the head coach of the Lamar Cardinals basketball team.

== Early life and playing career ==
Fee grew up in Grove City, Pennsylvania and attended Grove City Senior High School, where his father was the head basketball coach. He received an appointment United States Air Force Academy Preparatory School, where he was the captain of the basketball team. After completing his prep year, Fee enrolled at University of Detroit Mercy and joined the Titans' basketball team as a walk-on. After his sophomore year, he transferred to West Liberty University and played for the Hilltoppers.

== Coaching career ==
Fee began his coaching career as a student assistant for West Liberty in 2012. He was hired as a graduate assistant at Clarion the following season. Fee returned to Detroit Mercy as part of the Titans' coaching staff in 2014 as a graduate assistant.

Fee was hired as an assistant coach at Nova Southeastern on June 2, 2015, by then-head coach Gary Tuell. He was later retained by his former coach at West Liberty, Jim Crutchfield, following Tuell's retirement after the 2015–16 season. Fee was promoted to associate head coach going into the 2022–23 season. The Sharks went a 36–0 and won the 2023 NCAA Division II men's basketball tournament.

Fee was hired as the head coach of the Gannon University Golden Knights. He turned the Golden Knights team that had lost 3–23 in the previous season to a 32–3 record as the team won the Pennsylvania State Athletic Conference (PSAC) West division and the PSAC tournament. Gannon advanced to the Elite Eight of the 2024 NCAA Division II men's basketball tournament. Fee was named the PSAC West coach of the Year and received the Clarence Gaines Award as the best head coach in NCAA Division II.

Fee left Gannon after one season to take an assistant position on John Jakus's inaugural coaching staff at Florida Atlantic.

Fee was announced as the head coach of Lamar Cardinals on March 14, 2026.

== Head coaching record ==
Record table
Season	Team	Overall	Conference	Standing	Postseason
Gannon (Pennsylvania State Athletic Conference) (2023–2024)
2023–24	Gannon	32–3	20–2	1st (West)	NCAA Division II Elite Eight
Gannon:		32–3 (.914)	20–2 (.909)		
Lamar Cardinals (Southland Conference) (2026–present)
2026–27	Lamar	2–1	0–0		
Lamar:		2–1 (.667)	0–0 (–)		
Total:		34–4 (.895)			
National champion Postseason invitational champion Conference regular season champion Conference regular season and conference tournament champion Division regular season champion Division regular season and conference tournament champion Conference tournament champion
