= Roberto Wallace =

American football player (born 1986)

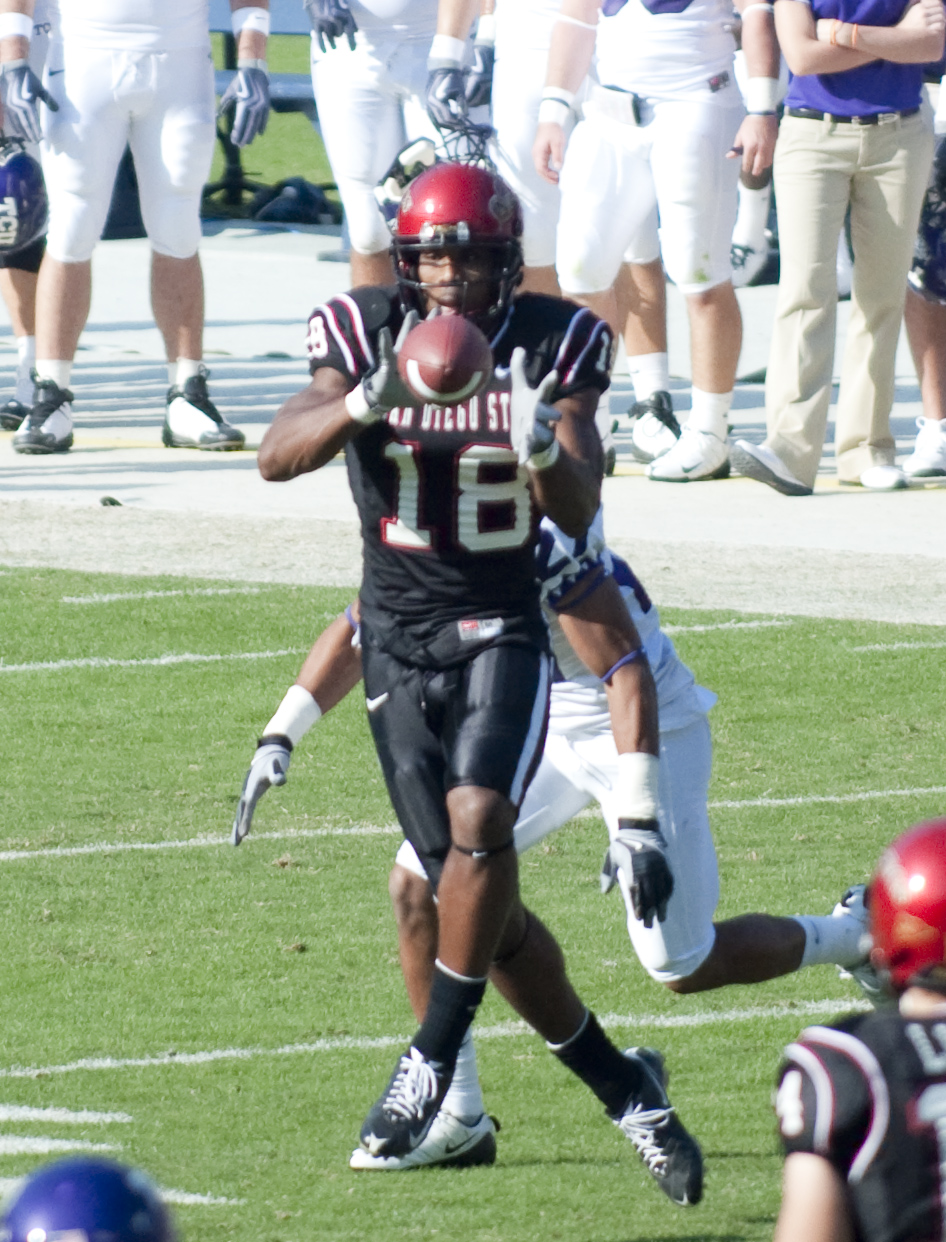
- Wallace with San Diego State in 2009

No. 18
- Position: Wide receiver

Personal information
- Born: May 10, 1986 (age 40); Panama City, Panama
- Listed height: 6 ft 4 in (1.93 m)
- Listed weight: 222 lb (101 kg)

Career information
- High school: Oceanside (Oceanside, California, U.S.)
- College: San Diego State (2005–2009)
- NFL draft: 2010: undrafted

Career history
- Miami Dolphins (2010−2011); Tennessee Titans (2013)*; Montreal Alouettes (2013)*
- * Offseason or practice squad member only

Career NFL statistics
- Receptions: 6
- Receiving yards: 62
- Stats at Pro Football Reference

Roberto Wallace (born May 10, 1986) is a Panamanian born, former professional American football wide receiver who played for the Miami Dolphins of the National Football League (NFL). He played college football at San Diego State.

== Early life ==
Wallace was born in Panama and attended an American school on a U.S. Army base, where his father worked. He grew up playing soccer, even representing Panama at a youth international level. When his father's job was transferred to Puerto Rico, Wallace went to live with his aunt in Oceanside, California, in 2002. He attended Oceanside High School, where he tried American football for the first time as a junior in 2003.

== College career ==
Wallace started attending San Diego State University in 2005. He red-shirted his first season as an Aztec and during spring ball had shoulder surgery that withheld him from the 2006 season. In his junior year at SDSU, Wallace was able to see more playing time on the field. He played in his first career games against Washington State and Arizona State but did not log a reception. His first career catch came in the win over Portland State for nine receiving yards. Starting against New Mexico, Wallace recorded three catches for 20 yards. Quickly after, he had two catches for 43 yards, including a long of 31. By the end of the season, Wallace had tallied his first six catches of his career for 72 yards.

As he did in high school, Wallace grew as a player going into his senior season and started in 9 of the 11 games he played in. In the season opener against Cal Poly, Wallace had two catches including his first career touchdown. He made four catches against Notre Dame with 40 yards and a long of 14. After one catch against San Jose State, Wallace had three catches for 47 yards with a long of 22 yards in the win over Idaho. The career-long 34-yard catch at TCU, two catches for 27 yards against New Mexico, and the two catches for 30 yards against Colorado State led to a breakout performance at Wyoming. He had career bests in both yards and catches with 7 catches for 66 yards. As the Mountain West Conference play was coming to an end, Wallace had four catches at BYU and three for 47 yards against No. 8 Utah. In his last game, he made two catches for 33 yards in a win over UNLV. He was awarded 2008 most improved offensive player for his senior season. On May 22, 2010, Wallace finished school at San Diego State and graduated with a sociology degree.

=== Statistics ===
Year	Rec	Yds	Lng	Avg	Td
2007	6	72	31	12	0
2008	31	405	34	13.1	1
2009	36	463	34	12.9	3

== Professional career ==
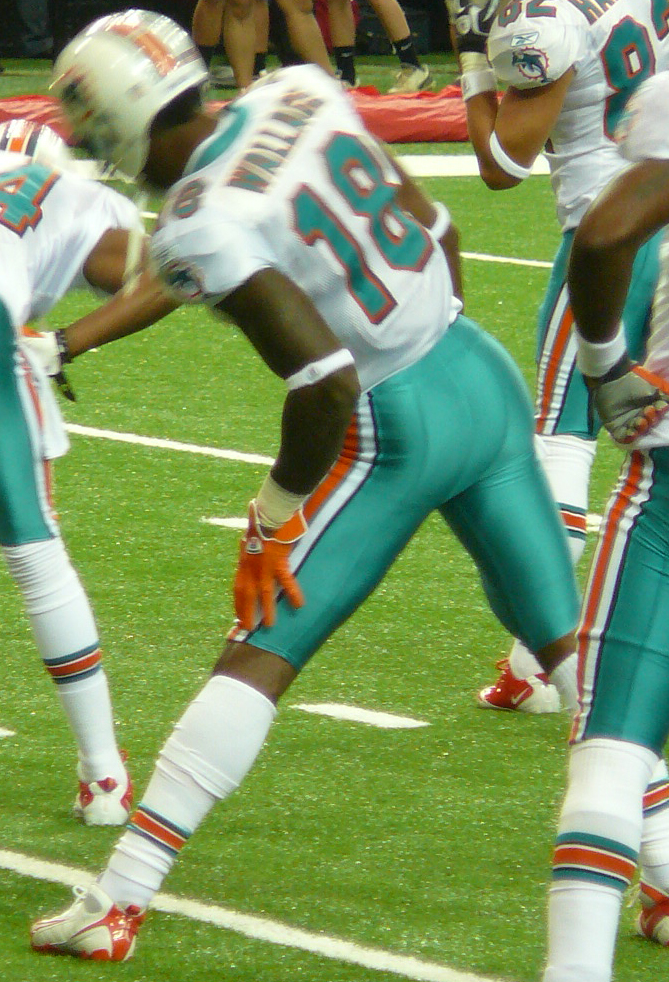
Wallace with the Dolphins in 2011

=== Miami Dolphins ===
After going undrafted in the 2010 NFL draft. Wallace was signed by the Miami Dolphins as an undrafted free agent in 2010. He was subsequently cut from the team on August 31, 2012.

=== Tennessee Titans ===
On January 14, 2013, Wallace was signed by the Tennessee Titans. On August 26, 2013, he was waived by the Titans.

=== Montreal Alouettes ===
On September 12, 2013, Wallace signed a two-year contract with the Montreal Alouettes of the Canadian Football League, being placed on the team's practice roster. He retired on June 1, 2014, while still a member of the Alouettes.
