= 2009 Poinsettia Bowl =

2009 San Diego County Credit Union Poinsettia Bowl
Utah Utes	California Golden Bears
(9–3)	(8–4)
Mountain West	Pac-10
37	27
Head coach: Kyle Whittingham	Head coach: Jeff Tedford
AP / Coaches / BCS; 23 / 24 / 23
	1	2	3	4	Total
Utah	7	17	3	10	37
California	14	0	7	6	27
- Date: December 23, 2009
- Season: 2009
- Stadium: Qualcomm Stadium
- Location: San Diego, California
- MVP: QB Jordan Wynn, Utah (Offensive); LB Stevenson Sylvester, Utah (Defensive)
- Referee: Bill Athan (WAC)
- Attendance: 32,665
- Payout: US$500,000

United States TV coverage
- Network: ESPN
- Announcers: Mike Patrick (Play by Play); Craig James (Analyst); Heather Cox (Sideline)
- Nielsen ratings: 2.4

The 2009 San Diego County Credit Union Poinsettia Bowl was the fifth edition of the college football bowl game and was played at Qualcomm Stadium in San Diego, California. The game started at 5 p.m. US PST on Wednesday, December 23, 2009 on ESPN. The Utah Utes defeated the California Golden Bears by a score of 37–27 to win their ninth straight bowl game. The Bears lost their first bowl game since 2004, snapping a winning streak of four post-season victories.

== Pre-game buildup ==
The Utes from the Mountain West Conference had won eight straight bowl appearances, including the last season's Sugar Bowl against Alabama. The Utes also faced their former offensive coordinator, Andy Ludwig, who had helped guide them the previous year to a 13–0 record and #2 ranking.

Cal played its third bowl game in San Diego in six years, having made two previous trips to the Holiday Bowl in 2004 and 2006. The Bears had not lost a bowl game since 2004. It was the seventh straight year that Cal head coach Jeff Tedford had guided Cal to a bowl appearance, the longest streak in school history.

The game was Cal's first appearance in the Poinsettia Bowl, while Utah was playing in its second. The Utes defeated Navy by a score of 35–32 in the 2007 game. It was the seventh overall meeting between the two schools and their first in post-season. Cal held a 4–2 advantage in the series, the first game of which took place in 1920.

The last matchup between them was in 2003, a game won by Utah 31–24.

== Game summary ==
Cal wore their home navy blue jerseys and Utah wore their away white jerseys.

=== First quarter ===
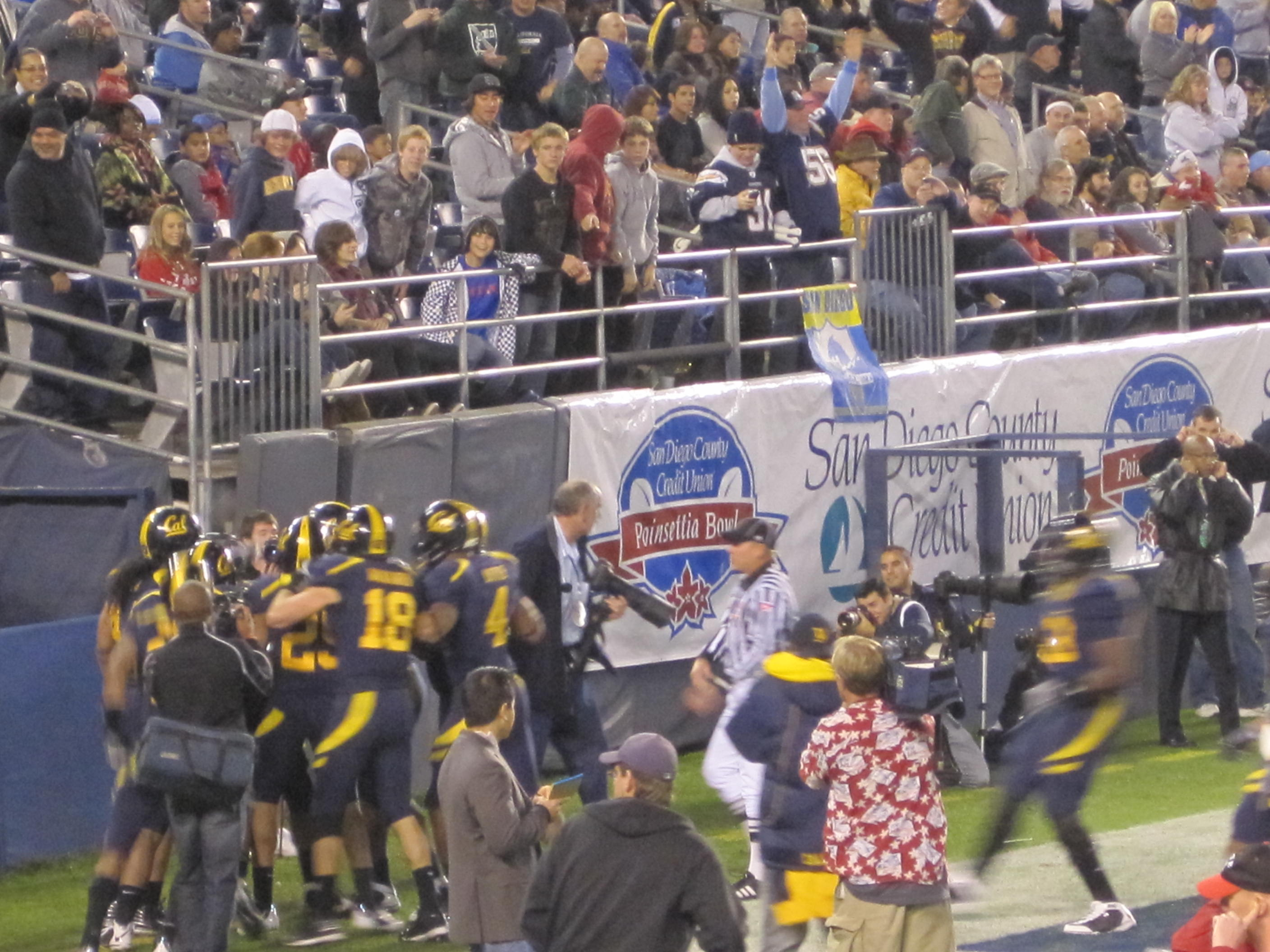
California players celebrate after Eddie Young's interception scored a touchdown to take a 14–0 lead

Cal won the coin toss and elected to defer until the second half. The game started promisingly for the Bears, who were able to hold the Utes on their first two possessions. Midway through the first quarter, Cal scored first on a 36-yard run by Shane Vereen. The Bears quickly struck again when linebacker Eddie Young intercepted Jordan Wynn for a 30-yard touchdown return on the ensuing possession. From this point on however, the game belonged to the Utes. Utah's comeback began with a 61-yard kickoff return by Shaky Smithson that helped set up the first touchdown pass of the night for Wynn on a 6-yard strike to Kendrick Moeai.

=== Second quarter ===
Cal struggled offensively in the second quarter and could not get past midfield. Utah scored on all three of its possessions with a field goal, 15-yard touchdown reception by Moeai, and 21-yard touchdown reception by Jereme Brooks. The Utes led 24–14 at the half and had scored 24 unanswered points.

=== Third quarter ===
The second half saw the game seesaw back and forth defensively until Kevin Riley was sacked, resulting in a fumble which the Utes recovered late in the third quarter. Cal was able to hold Utah to a field goal and responded on the next possession by driving downfield, allowing Vereen to score his second touchdown of the night on a 1-yard run.

=== Fourth quarter ===
Utah put up the first points of the fourth quarter on a field goal, and Stevenson Sylvester intercepted Riley on a tipped pass that he was able to return for a 27-yard touchdown. Riley threw a second straight interception, but the defense was able to hold the Utes. The final score of the game came late in the quarter on a 24-yard touchdown reception by Jeremy Ross to make the score 37–27 Utah. Cal attempted a two-point conversion, which failed. An attempt at an onside kick was recovered by Utah, allowing Wynn to take three straight knees.

=== Scoring summary ===
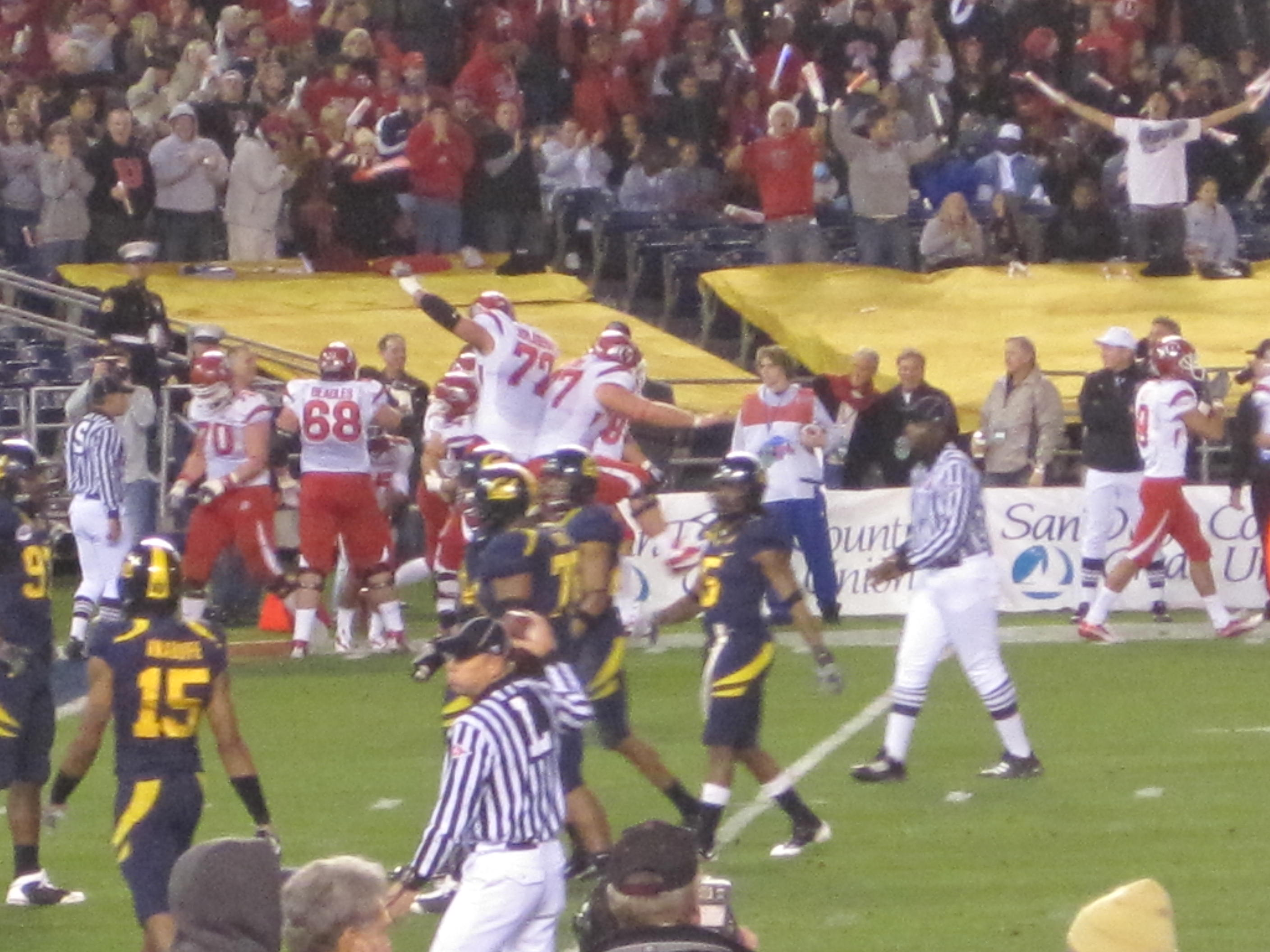
Jereme Brooks scores a Utah touchdown in the second quarter

Scoring Play	Score
1st Quarter
Cal — Shane Vereen 36 Yd run (Vince D'Amato Kick), 6:06	Cal 7–0
Cal — Eddie Young interception return for 31 Yd (Vince D'Amato Kick), 5:55	Cal 14–0
Utah — Kendrick Moeai 6 Yd pass from Jordan Wynn (Joe Phillips Kick), 1:35	Cal 14–7
2nd Quarter
Utah — Joe Phillips 28 Yd, 9:31	Cal 14–10
Utah — Kendrick Moeai 15 Yd Pass From Jordan Wynn (Joe Phillips Kick), 4:58	Utah 17–14
Utah — Jereme Brooks 21 Yd Pass From Jordan Wynn (Joe Phillips Kick), 0:43	Utah 24–14
3rd Quarter
Utah — Joe Phillips 29 Yd, 3:13	Utah 27–14
Cal — Shane Vereen 1 Yd run (Vince D'Amato Kick), 0:39	Utah 27–21
4th Quarter
Utah — Joe Phillips 25 Yd, 13:05	Utah 30–21
Utah — Stevenson Sylvester interception return for 27 Yd (Joe Phillips Kick), 5:27	Utah 37–21
Cal — Jeremy Ross 24 Yd pass from Kevin Riley (2 pt conversion failed), 1:46	Utah 37–27

== Game notes ==
Utah's true freshman quarterback Jordan Wynn, who grew up less than an hour from San Diego, returned home and threw for a career-high 338 yards and three touchdowns on his way to being named the game's offensive MVP. Linebacker Stevenson Sylvester, who had an interception return for a touchdown, was the game's defensive MVP. Wide receiver David Reed set school records for catches (81) and receiving yards (1,188) in a season. Both records came on a 39-yard catch in the fourth quarter. The Utes scored 27 straight points to win their ninth straight bowl game, which tied them (with USC's 1923–1945 teams) for the second longest bowl winning streak in history. Shane Vereen, who scored twice, was the seventh Cal running back to gain more than 100 yards in a bowl, finishing with 122 yards on 20 carries. Vereen had been filling in for star running back Jahvid Best, who was sitting out his fourth straight game after sustaining a concussion on November 7.

The attendance of 32,665 was the second-lowest in the bowl's history.
