= Jose Perez (American football) =

American football player (born 1985)

No. 43
- Position: Cornerback

Personal information
- Born: September 15, 1985 (age 41); Cherry Point, North Carolina, U.S.
- Listed height: 5 ft 11 in (1.80 m)
- Listed weight: 193 lb (88 kg)

Career information
- High school: Oceanside (Oceanside, California)
- College: San Diego State
- NFL draft: 2011: undrafted

Career history
- Miami Dolphins (2011)*
- * Offseason or practice squad member only
- Stats at Pro Football Reference

Jose Perez Jr. (born September 15, 1985) is an American former professional football player who was a cornerback in the National Football League (NFL). He played college football at San Diego State University (SDSU). He was selected by the New York Yankees in the seventh round of the 2003 Major League Baseball draft.

== Early life ==
Jose Perez Jr. was born in North Carolina, and grew up in Oceanside, California and attended Oceanside High School. With the Oceanside Pirates he played middle linebacker in his freshman year before switching to wide receiver. He led his team to the CIF Championship. As a senior, he caught 57 passes for 1112 yards in earning all-county honors.

== Professional baseball ==
Perez, one of California's top outfielders and wide receivers in high school, initially committed to attending SDSU, where he would play both college football under Tom Craft and college baseball under Tony Gwynn. However, Perez—who grew up a Yankee fan—instead accepted a six-figure bonus to play with Yankees. He played minor league baseball in the Yankee organization for three seasons before being released.

== College football ==
Perez then joined SDSU's football team as a walk-on, where was converted from receiver to cornerback. Perez received an honorable mention for the All-Mountain West team in his senior year.

== Professional football ==
Perez was signed by the Miami Dolphins as undrafted free agent in 2011, but was released in the preseason.
