= Steve Kinder =

American college basketball coach

Current position
- Title: Assistant coach
- Team: Hawaii–Hilo Vulcans
- Conference: PacWest

Biographical details
- Born: c. 1963

Playing career
- 1981–1983: MiraCosta
- 1983–1985: Cal Poly Humboldt

Coaching career (HC unless noted)
- 1985–1988: Cal Poly Humboldt (GA)
- 1988–1990: Oceanside HS
- 1990–2010: Cal Poly Humboldt (assistant)
- 2010–2020: Cal Poly Humboldt
- 2020–present: Hawaii–Hilo (assistant)

Head coaching record
- Overall: 161–128 (.557)
- Tournaments: 0–3 (NCAA Division II)

Accomplishments and honors

Championships
- CCAA regular season (2011); 2× CCAA tournament (2012, 2016)

Awards
- Clarence Gaines Award (2011); CCAA Coach of the Year (2011)

Steve Kinder (born c. 1963) is a former head basketball coach of the California State Polytechnic University, Humboldt (HSU) Lumberjacks. As of 2026–27 he is he an assistant coach for Hawaii–Hilo Vulcans men's basketball program.

During his prep school days, Kinder attended Escondido High School in Escondido, California. As a collegiate student-athlete, Kinder won a Pacific Coast Athletic Conference basketball championship at MiraCosta College and reached the California State Final Four championship game. Kinder was named "Athlete of the Year" at MCC, 1983. Kinder then earned a B.S. in physical education from HSU in 1985 when he also played for the basketball team that won the California Collegiate Athletic Association (CCAA) that year. He received an M.A. from Humboldt in 1988. Kinder also competed in track and field at HSU. He qualified for the NCAA Track and Field Championships with a throw of 223'10" that was a record second-best in school history. He was the Pacific Coast Athletic Conference javelin champion and finished third at the CCAA track and field championships.

He was an assistant basketball coach at Oceanside High School from 1988 to 1990. He returned to Humboldt where he served as an assistant to basketball coach Tom Wood from 1990 to 2010.

In his first year as head coach in the 2010–11 season the Lumberjacks went 26–4, won the CCAA regular season title and appeared in the NCAA playoffs. That year he received the first-ever Clarence Gaines Award, given to the nation's best NCAA Division II head basketball coach.

In the 2011–12 season the team was 22–8, won the CCAA tournament and lost in the first round of the NCAA playoffs. The Lumberjacks also won the CCAA tournament again in 2016.

In 2020, after compiling an overall record of 161–128 at Humboldt State, Kinder went to the University of Hawaiʻi at Hilo to become an assistant coach for their men's basketball program.

== Head coaching record ==
Record table
Season	Team	Overall	Conference	Standing	Postseason
Cal Poly Humboldt Lumberjacks (California Collegiate Athletic Association) (2010–2020)
2010–11	Cal Poly Humboldt	26–4	20–2	1st	NCAA Division II first round
2011–12	Cal Poly Humboldt	22–8	15–7	T–2nd	NCAA Division II first round
2012–13	Cal Poly Humboldt	11–15	7–15	T–9th	
2013–14	Cal Poly Humboldt	11–17	6–15	T–9th	
2014–15	Cal Poly Humboldt	22–8	15–7	3rd	
2015–16	Cal Poly Humboldt	21–9	12–8	T–4th	NCAA Division II first round
2016–17	Cal Poly Humboldt	13–16	7–13	T–9th	
2017–18	Cal Poly Humboldt	9–19	6–16	T–11th	
2018–19	Cal Poly Humboldt	17–14	11–11	T–7th	
2019–20	Cal Poly Humboldt	9–18	5–17	12th	No postseason held
Cal Poly Humboldt:		161–128 (.557)	104–111 (.484)		
Total:		161–128 (.557)			
National champion Postseason invitational champion Conference regular season champion Conference regular season and conference tournament champion Division regular season champion Division regular season and conference tournament champion Conference tournament champion
