= Oceanside High School =

Coordinates: 33°11′49.44″N 117°22′26.91″W

Oceanside High School (California)
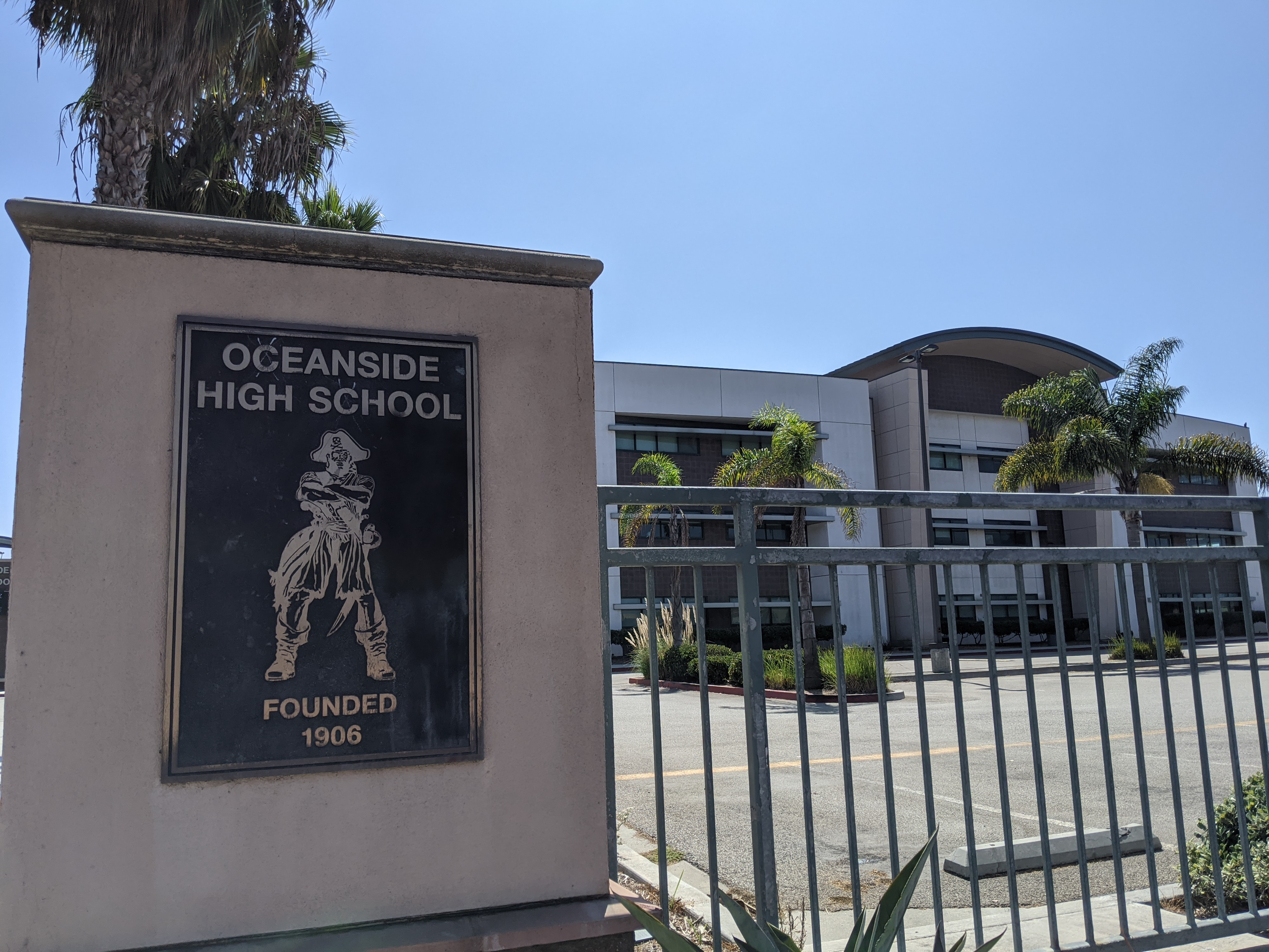

Location
- 1 Pirates Cove; Oceanside, California, 92054; United States

Information
- School type: Public
- Established: 1906
- Principal: Skyler Garrahy
- Teaching staff: 90.95 (FTE)
- Grades: 9-12
- Enrollment: 1,828 (2023-2024)
- Student to teacher ratio: 20.10
- Colors: Green, black, white and silver
- Mascot: Pirates
- Rival: El Camino High School
- Newspaper: The Driftwood
- Website: ohs.oside.us

Oceanside High School is an American public secondary school located in Oceanside, California. It is part of the Oceanside Unified School District (OUSD).

OUSD on-post properties of Marine Corps Base Camp Pendleton are assigned to this high school. The San Diego Association of Governments stated that the school "has been noted as an important resource for the Camp Pendleton community as it serves as the high school for many students of military families since there is no high school on base."

== History and campus ==
Oceanside High School is one of two high schools in the Oceanside Unified School District serving Oceanside, CA. Founded in 1906, the school was originally was located on the second floor of a one-room schoolhouse located at the site of the present campus. The school primarily serves Oceanside's beach communities and rests less than one mile from the beach. Throughout much of the first half of the 1900s the campus served as the high school for the majority of the North County region—its territory spanned as far south as Encinitas and east to Vista. In 1934, the school opened a junior college division, which operated on the eastern side of campus and existed until the 1970s when MiraCosta College opened its own campus.

The current school grounds occupy approximately 32 acres in downtown Oceanside. The oldest building still in use on the campus is known as Senior Hall. OHS has experienced recent renovations due to a $125 million bond measure passed by Oceanside residents in 2000 that provided funding to the city's schools. The remodeled campus includes new landscaping, athletic fields, and a three-story science and technology building. A new performing arts center had its grand opening on September 30, 2017. Renovations to other existing buildings such as Senior Hall and the library were included as part of the bond initiative.

== Student body ==
As of 2024, the school had over 1,800 students. The school is 62.3% Hispanic or Latino, 21.3% White, 4.60% Black or African American, 1.8% Filipino, 1.9% Native Hawaiian or Pacific Islander, 0.7% Asian, 0.5% Native American or Alaskan Native, and 5.7% as two or more races. 75.6% of the student body is socioeconomically disadvantaged.

== Notable alumni ==
Name	Grad Class	Category	Best Known For
Barbara Mandrell	1967	Arts and Media	Country singer, Grammy Award winner, and former Miss Oceanside
Jordan Howlett	2015	Social media	American social media personality also known as Jordan the Stallion
Jim Evans	N/A	Arts and Media	Artist/Designer, known for T.A.Z. poster art and as the Owner/Creative Director of Division 13
Victor Villaseñor	N/A	Literature	Mexican-American writer, author of Rain of Gold
Willie Banks	N/A	Sports	Former Olympic triple jumper and world-record holder
Thad Bosley	N/A	Sports	Former MLB outfielder for teams like the Chicago Cubs and Texas Rangers
Willie Buchanon	N/A	Sports	American former professional football player who was a cornerback
Will Buchanon	N/A	Sports	Former American football wide receiver
Chris Chambliss	N/A	Sports	American professional baseball player and coach
Charles Dimry	N/A	Sports	Former NFL cornerback for teams like the Tampa Bay Buccaneers and Denver Broncos
Lee Guetterman	N/A	Sports	Former MLB pitcher for the New York Yankees and Seattle Mariners
C.R. Roberts	N/A	Sports	American professional football player who was a fullback in the Canadian Football League (CFL) and National Football League (NFL)
Jose Perez	N/A	Sports	cornerback in the National Football League (NFL)
Joe Salave'a	N/A	Sports	Former NFL defensive tackle and college football coach
Bill Sandifer	N/A	Sports	Former NFL defensive lineman for the San Francisco 49ers and Seattle Seahawks
Junior Seau	1987	Sports	Former NFL linebacker
Gary Thomasson	N/A	Sports	Former MLB outfielder and first baseman
Terry Vaughn	N/A	Sports	Former CFL wide receiver and three-time Grey Cup champion
Roberto Wallace	N/A	Sports	Former NFL wide receiver for the Miami Dolphins
Sam Brenner	N/A	Sports	Former NFL offensive lineman for the Miami Dolphins and Denver Broncos
Brian Schwenke	N/A	Sports	Former NFL center for the Tennessee Titans and New England Patriots
Larry Warford	N/A	Sports	Former NFL offensive guard and three-time Pro Bowl selection
Jace Whittaker	N/A	Sports	
Alijah Holder	N/A	Sports	Former NFL cornerback for the Denver Broncos -

== Notable faculty ==
- Steve Kinder - assistant basketball coach at the school from 1989 to 1990

== Use in media ==
The exteriors of Oceanside High School are used for the fictional Neptune High on the television show Veronica Mars. Several shots of the television show American Vandal have been filmed at this school.

== Image gallery ==
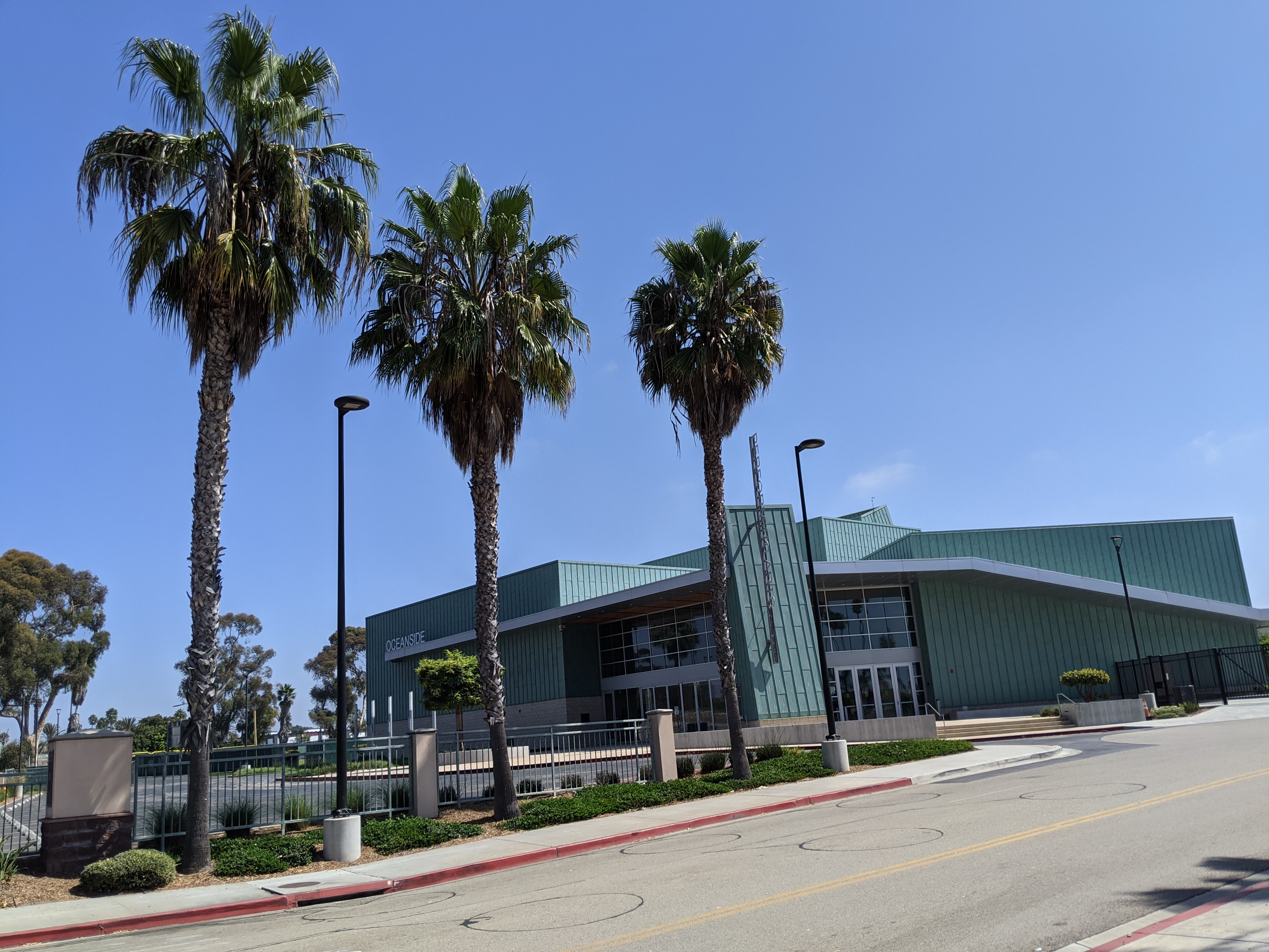
Performing Arts Center

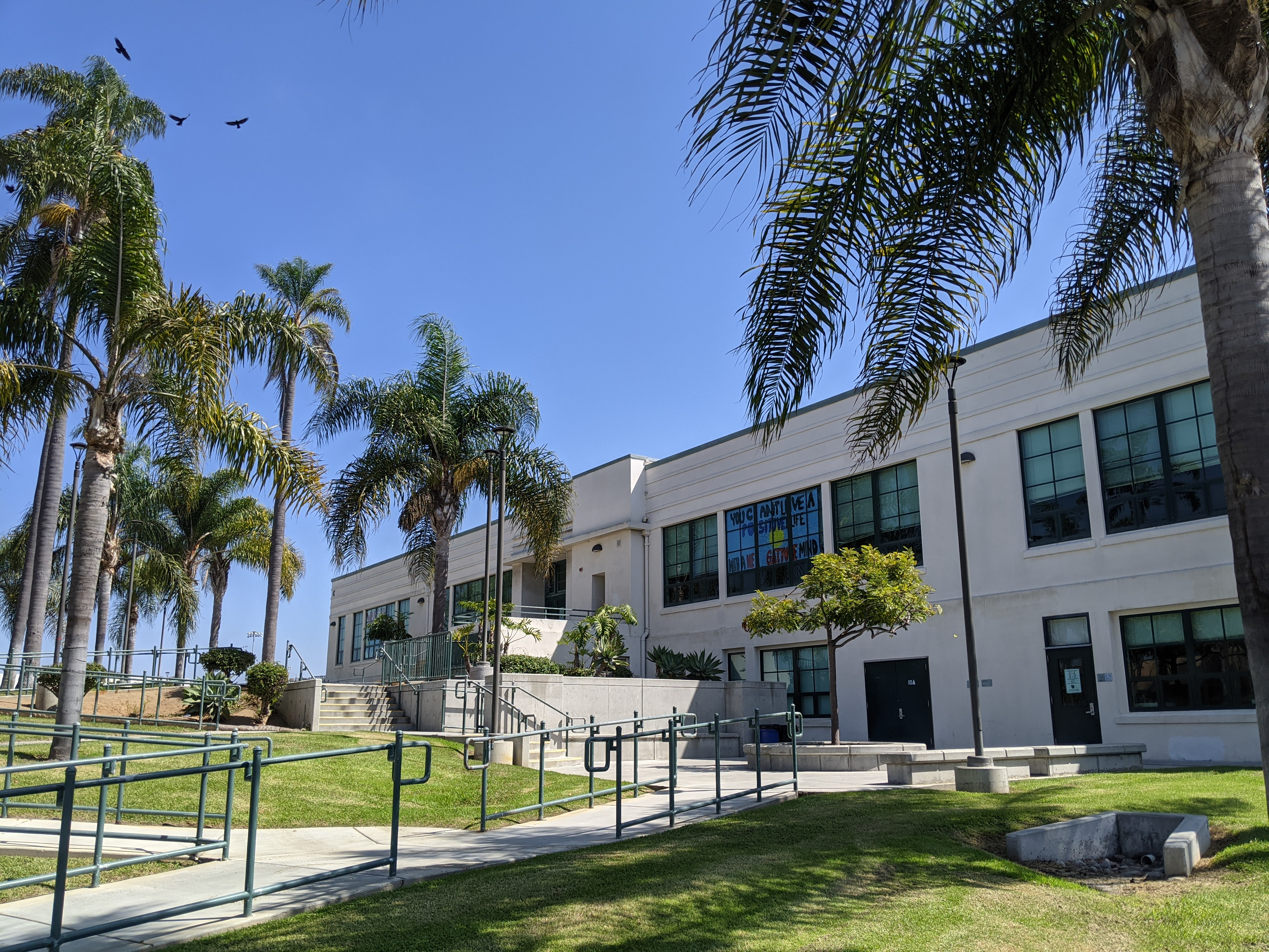
Senior Hall Building

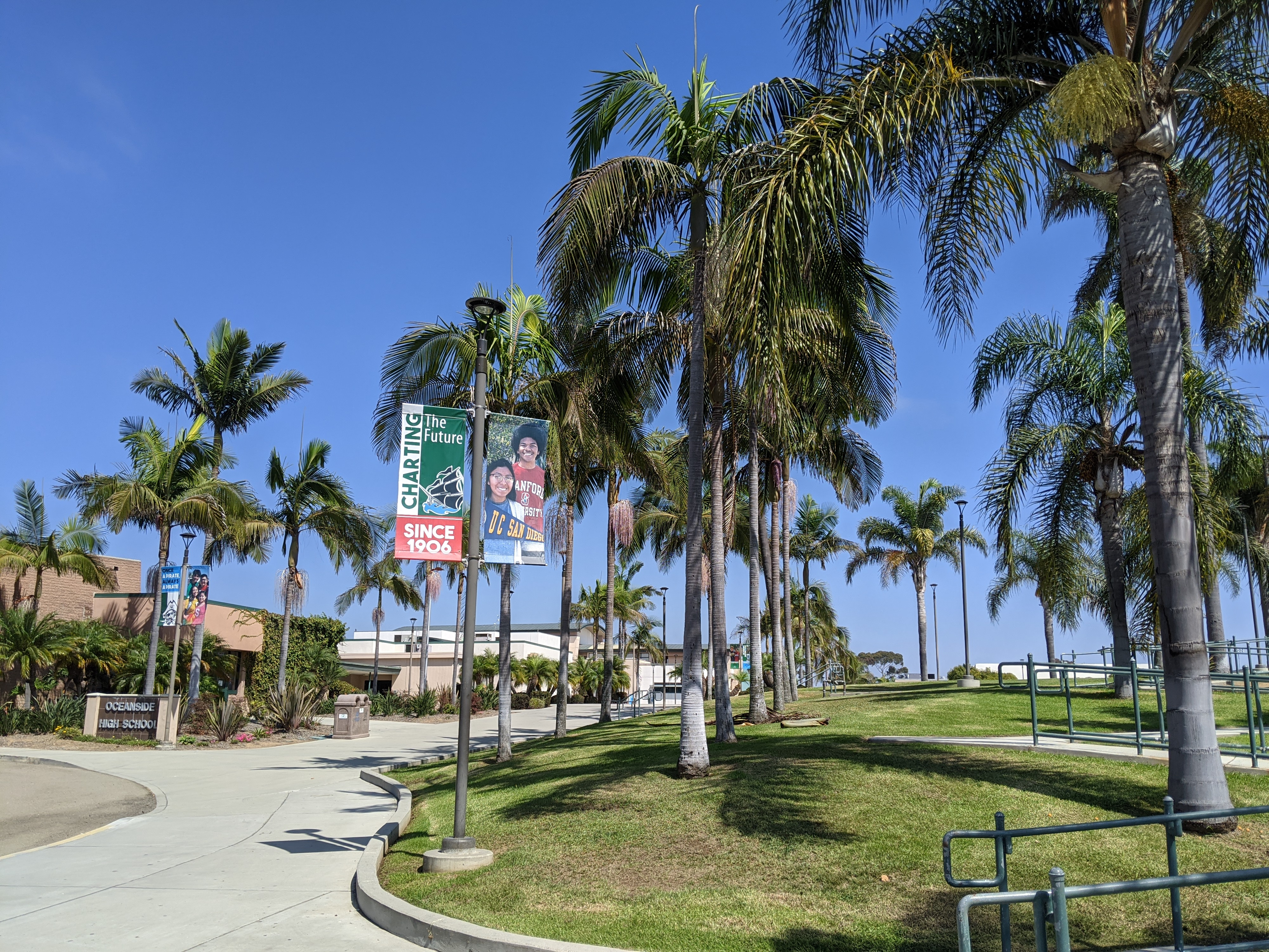
Campus
