= Will Buchanon =

American football player (born 1983)

No. 13
- Position: Wide receiver

Personal information
- Born: April 5, 1983 (age 43); Oceanside, California, U.S.
- Listed height: 6 ft 3 in (1.91 m)
- Listed weight: 190 lb (86 kg)

Career information
- High school: Oceanside
- College: USC
- NFL draft: 2006: undrafted

Career history
- Oakland Raiders (2006); New York Giants (2007)*; Kansas City Chiefs (2007)*; Oakland Raiders (2008)*; Carolina Panthers (2008)*
- * Offseason or practice squad member only
- Stats at Pro Football Reference

Willie James Buchanon, Jr. (born April 5, 1983) is an American former professional football player who was a wide receiver for one season with the Oakland Raiders of the National Football League (NFL). He was signed by the Raiders as an undrafted free agent in 2006. He played college football for the USC Trojans. Buchanon was also a member of the New York Giants, Kansas City Chiefs and Carolina Panthers. He is the son of former NFL cornerback Willie Buchanon.

== Early life ==
Buchanon attended Oceanside High School.

== College career ==
Buchanon played college football at the University of Southern California.

== Professional career ==
=== First stint with Raiders ===
Buchanon signed to the Oakland Raiders as an undrafted free agent. Despite a great showing in the 2006 Hall of Fame Game win against the Philadelphia Eagles, he did not make the team's final 53-man roster, but he was signed to the practice squad.

After the Raiders were hit with a string of injuries late in the year, resulting in several players being placed on the injured reserve, Buchanon was activated from the practice squad on December 20, 2006, and signed to the 53-man roster. For the last few games of the regular season, he was even on the 40-man roster active for the games. He saw very limited playing time, but still made one catch for nine yards in a losing contest against the Kansas City Chiefs in Week 16.

On August 16, 2007 the Raiders released him.

=== New York Giants ===
On August 21, 2007 the Giants picked him off waivers and released him six days later.

=== Kansas City Chiefs ===
On September 20, 2007, he was picked up by the Chiefs and put on their Practice squad.

=== Second stint with Raiders ===
In the 2008 offseason, Buchanon re-signed with the Raiders. However, he was waived by the team on July 23.

=== Carolina Panthers ===
On July 28, 2008, Buchanon was signed by the Carolina Panthers. He was released by the team during final cuts on August 30, but re-signed to the practice squad a day later. He was released from the practice squad on December 16.
