= Clarence Gaines Award =

College basketball coaching award

- Awarded for: the nation's top head coach in NCAA Division II men's basketball
- Country: United States
- Presented by: Collegeinsider.com

History
- First award: 2011
- Most recent: Bryan Rooney, Cal State East Bay
- Website: ClarenceGainesAward.com

The Clarence "Big House" Gaines Award is an award given annually by Collegeinsider.com to the most outstanding men's college basketball head coach in NCAA Division II. The award was established in 2011 and is named for the late Clarence Gaines, who coached for 47 years at Winston-Salem State University.

== Key ==
Coach (X)	Denotes the number of times the coach has been awarded the Clarence Gaines Award at that point
W, L, W %	Total wins, total losses, win percentage
Finish	Postseason tournament result
*	Denotes national championship season

== Winners ==
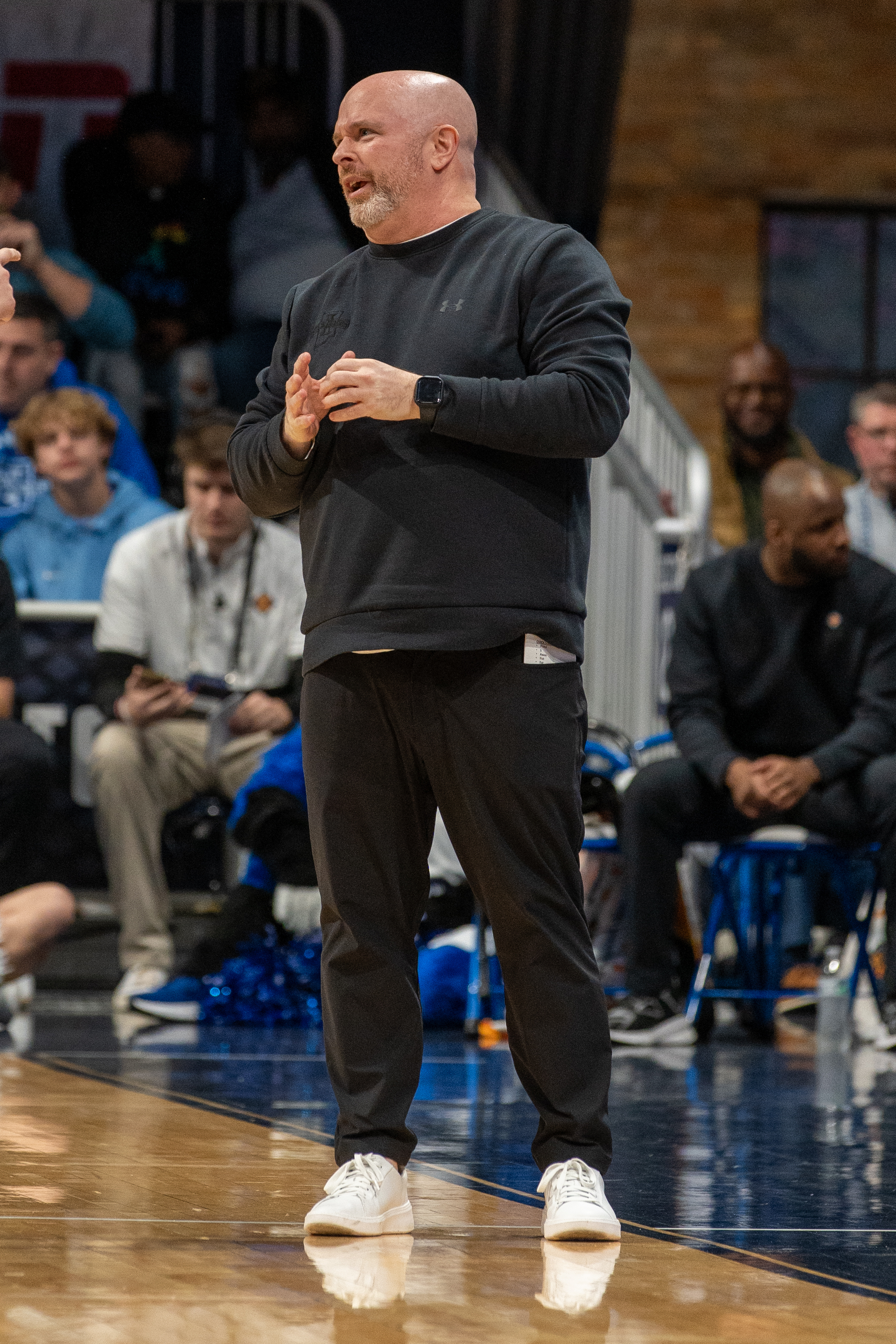
Josh Schertz, 2016

Season	Coach	School	W	L	W %	Finish	Reference
2010–11	Steve Kinder	Cal Poly Humboldt	26	4	.867	NCAA first round	
2011–12	Ben McCollum	Northwest Missouri State	22	7	.759	NCAA first round	
2012–13	Tom Billeter	Augustana (South Dakota)	22	9	.710	NCAA second round	
2013–14	Jeff Wilson	East Stroudsburg	30	2	.938	NCAA Sweet Sixteen	
2014–15	Chad Walthall	Minnesota State–Moorhead	35	4	.897	NCAA Elite Eight	
2015–16	Josh Schertz	Lincoln Memorial	34	3	.919	NCAA runners-up	
2016–17	Darren Vorderbruegge	Hawaii Pacific	29	3	.906	NCAA second round	
2017–18	Grady Brewer	Morehouse	25	3	.893	NCAA first round	
2018–19	Andre Cook	St. Edward's	30	4	.882	NCAA Sweet Sixteen	
2019–20	Ben McCollum (2)	Northwest Missouri State	31	1	.969	N/A^{[a]}	
2020–21	Todd Duncan	Lubbock Christian	18	3	.857	NCAA Sweet Sixteen	
2021–22	Ben McCollum (3)	Northwest Missouri State	34	5	.872	NCAA champion*	
2022–23	Jim Crutchfield	Nova Southeastern	36	0	1.000	NCAA champion*	
2023–24	Jordan Fee	Gannon	32	3	.914	NCAA Elite Eight	
2024–25	Mike MacDonald	Daemen	28	1	.966	NCAA second round	
2025–26	Bryan Rooney	Cal State East Bay	33	1	.971	NCAA Elite Eight	

- ^{a} The COVID-19 pandemic caused the 2020 NCAA Division II men's basketball tournament to be canceled prior to it occurring.
