= Mike MacDonald (basketball) =

American basketball coach

Current position
- Title: Head coach
- Team: St. Bonaventure Bonnies
- Conference: A10
- Record: 4–1 (.800)

Biographical details
- Education: St. Bonaventure University, Canisius College

Coaching career (HC unless noted)
- 1988–1990: Canisius (GA)
- 1990–1997: Canisius (assistant)
- 1997–2006: Canisius
- 2006–2014: Medaille
- 2014–2026: Daemen
- 2026–present: St. Bonaventure

Head coaching record
- Overall: 526–313 (.627)

Accomplishments and honors

Championships
- USCAA Division I national (2015); 2× AMCC regular season (2010, 2012); 3× ECC regular season (2019, 2025, 2026); 2× ECC tournament (2025, 2026)

Awards
- Clarence Gaines Award (2025); 3× ECC Coach of the Year (2019, 2025, 2026); 4× AMCC Coach of the Year (2007, 2009, 2010, 2012)

Mike MacDonald is an American basketball coach, currently serving as the head men's basketball coach at St. Bonaventure University. He previously served as head basketball coach at Canisius College from 1997 to 2006, and at Medaille College from 2006 to 2014. MacDonald has an all-time career record of 386–277. MacDonald was named head men's basketball coach at St. Bonaventure on March 30, 2026.

== Head coaching record ==
Record table
Season	Team	Overall	Conference	Standing	Postseason
Canisius Golden Griffins (Metro Atlantic Athletic Conference) (1997–2006)
1997–98	Canisius	13–14	9–9	6th	
1998–99	Canisius	15–12	11–7	4th	
1999–00	Canisius	10–20	8–10	8th	
2000–01	Canisius	20–11	9–9	7th	
2001–02	Canisius	10–20	5–13	8th	
2002–03	Canisius	10–18	6–12	9th	
2003–04	Canisius	10–20	5–13	8th	
2004–05	Canisius	11–18	8–10	7th	
2005–06	Canisius	9–20	6–12	9th	
Canisius:		108–153 (.414)	67–95 (.414)		
Medaille Mavericks (Allegheny Mountain Collegiate Conference) (2006–2014)
2006–07	Medaille	11–14	7–11	7th	
2007–08	Medaille	15–13	9–9	6th	
2008–09	Medaille	21–7	14–4	1st	NCAA Division III first round
2009–10	Medaille	24–5	16–4	1st	NCAA Division III second round
2010–11	Medaille	21–8	15–3	3rd	
2011–12	Medaille	25–3	17–1	1st	NCAA Division III first round
2012–13	Medaille	18–11	13–5	T–3rd	
2013–14	Medaille	14–12	13–5	T–2nd	
Medaille:		149–73 (.671)	104–42 (.712)		
Daemen Wildcats (USCAA Division I) (2014–2015)
2014–15	Daemen	21–10	13–7	3rd	USCAA Division I national champion
Daemen Wildcats (East Coast Conference) (2015–2026)
2015–16	Daemen	19–10	14–6	2nd	
2016–17	Daemen	19–9	12–6	T–3rd	
2017–18	Daemen	22–8	15–3	T–2nd	
2018–19	Daemen	24–6	16–2	1st	NCAA Division II Regionals first round
2019–20	Daemen	24–8	12–4	3rd	NCAA Division II Regionals — canceled
2020–21	Daemen	10–6	7–2	2nd	NCAA Division II Elite 8
2021–22	Daemen	20–9	16–2	2nd	
2022–23	Daemen	20–8	12–4	2nd	
2023–24	Daemen	25–9	12–4	3rd	NCAA Division II Regional semifinals
2024–25	Daemen	28–1	16–0	1st	NCAA Division II Regional semifinals
2025–26	Daemen	33–2	16–0	1st	NCAA Division II Elite 8
Daemen:		265–86 (.755)	161–40 (.801)		
St. Bonaventure Bonnies (Atlantic 10 Conference) (2026–present)
2026–27	St. Bonaventure	4–1	0–0		
St. Bonaventure:		4–1 (.800)	0–0 (–)		
Total:		526–313 (.627)			
National champion Postseason invitational champion Conference regular season champion Conference regular season and conference tournament champion Division regular season champion Division regular season and conference tournament champion Conference tournament champion
