= PSAC women's basketball tournament =

Pennsylvania State Athletic Conference women's basketball tournament
- Conference basketball championship
- Sport: Basketball
- Conference: Pennsylvania State Athletic Conference
- Number of teams: 12
- Format: Single-elimination tournament
- Played: 1980–present
- Current champion: Indiana (PA) (7th)
- Most championships: California (7); Indiana (PA) (7)
- Official website: PSAC women's basketball

The Pennsylvania State Athletic Conference (PSAC) women's basketball tournament is the annual conference women's basketball championship tournament for the Pennsylvania State Athletic Conference. It is a single-elimination tournament and seeding is based on regular season records.

The tournament has been held each year since 1980.

The winner receives the PSAC's automatic bid to the NCAA Women's Division II Basketball Championship.

== Results ==
Year	Champions	Score	Runner-up
1980	Cheyney State	85–35	Slippery Rock State
1981	Cheyney State	85–53	Slippery Rock State
1982	Cheyney State	92–33	Slippery Rock State
1983	Cheyney	89–38	Slippery Rock
1984	Millersville	69–54	Shippensburg
1985	Lock Haven	75–67	East Stroudsburg
1986	Slippery Rock	74–58	East Stroudsburg
1987	Millersville	56–55	Lock Haven
1988	Indiana	68–50	Millersville
1989	Lock Haven	70–62	Edinboro
1990	Edinboro	77–67	Lock Haven
1991	Clarion	87–71	Lock Haven
1992	Bloomsburg	70–40	Edinboro
1993	Clarion	104–81	Edinboro
1994	Clarion	71–69	California
1995	East Stroudsburg	80–71	Clarion
1996	Shippensburg	87–67	Slippery Rock
1997	Shippensburg	89–74	Edinboro
1998	Shippensburg	89–80 (OT)	Edinboro
1999	Shippensburg	92–85	Indiana
2000	Shippensburg	83–57	Millersville
2001	Shippensburg	86–71	California
2002	California	63–60	Millersville
2003	California	58–54	West Chester
2004	California	87–54	Shippensburg
2005	Millersville	76–71	California
2006	California	63–59	Edinboro
2007	Indiana	63–53	California
2008	Indiana	67–63	California
2009	Indiana	60–51 (OT)	California
2010	Gannon	77–68	California
2011	Edinboro	75–58	California
2012	Edinboro	74–58	Bloomsburg
2013	Bloomsburg	74–57	Gannon
2014	Edinboro	86–76	Gannon
2015	California	86–70	West Chester
2016	California	62–52	Indiana
2017	Indiana	84–79	California
2018	Edinboro	77–66	Millersville
2019	Indiana	72–57	Kutztown
2020	Gannon	50–40	Indiana
2021	Cancelled due to COVID-19 pandemic		
2022	Gannon	59–47	California
2023	California	75–63	Gannon
2024	Gannon	80–65	Lock Haven
2025	Kutztown	78–64	Edinboro
2026	IUP	61–57	Gannon

== Championship records ==
School	Finals Record	Finals Appearances	Years
California (PA)	7–10	17	2002, 2003, 2004, 2006, 2015, 2016, 2023
Indiana (PA)	7–3	10	1988, 2007, 2008, 2009, 2017, 2019, 2026
Shippensburg	6–2	8	1996, 1997, 1998, 1999, 2000, 2001
Edinboro	5–7	12	1990, 2011, 2012, 2014, 2018
Gannon	4–4	8	2010, 2020, 2022, 2024
Cheyney	4–0	4	1980, 1981, 1982, 1983
Millersville	3–4	7	1984, 1987, 2005
Clarion	3–1	4	1991, 1993, 1994
Bloomsburg	2–1	3	1992, 2013
Lock Haven	2–4	6	1985, 1989
Slippery Rock	1–5	6	1986
East Stroudsburg	1–2	3	1995
Kutztown	1–1	2	2025
West Chester	0–2	2	

- Schools highlighted in pink are former PSAC members.
- Mansfield, Pitt–Johnstown, Seton Hill, and Shepherd have not yet qualified for the PSAC tournament finals.
- Mercyhurst never qualified for the tournament finals as PSAC members.

== See also ==
- PSAC men's basketball tournament
