= C. R. Roberts =

American gridiron football player (1936–2023)

- Roberts in 1961

No. 98, 21, 90, 28, 32
- Position: Fullback

Personal information
- Born: February 29, 1936; Tupelo, Mississippi, U.S.
- Died: July 11, 2023 (aged 87); Norwalk, California, U.S.
- Listed height: 6 ft 3 in (1.91 m)
- Listed weight: 202 lb (92 kg)

Career information
- High school: Oceanside (Oceanside, California)
- College: USC
- NFL draft: 1958: 14th round, 166th overall pick

Career history
- Toronto Argonauts (1957-1958); Pittsburgh Steelers (1959)*; San Francisco 49ers (1959–1962); Hamilton Tiger-Cats (1962)
- * Offseason or practice squad member only

Awards and highlights
- First-team All-PCC (1956)

Career NFL statistics
- Rushing yards: 637
- Rushing average: 4.1
- Receptions: 21
- Receiving yards: 132
- Total touchdowns: 4
- Stats at Pro Football Reference

Cornelius R. Roberts (February 29, 1936 – July 11, 2023) was an American professional football player who was a fullback in the Canadian Football League (CFL) and National Football League (NFL). He played college football for the USC Trojans. He began his career in 1958 with the CFL with the Toronto Argonauts before joining the NFL's San Francisco 49ers the next season.

== Early life ==
Roberts graduated from Oceanside High School in Northern San Diego County, where he was a team captain in football. For both his junior and senior seasons in 1952 and 1953, respectively, Roberts was named the CIF Southern Section Lower Division Player of the Year by the Helms Athletic Foundation. Voted "Most Athletic" by his classmates, Roberts' senior class portrait carried the inscription, "Glenn Davis was never like this."

== College career ==
At the University of Southern California, Roberts led the Trojans to a 44–20 victory over Texas during the 1956 season. It was the first time a black player competed against a white player in that state. He rushed for 251 yards on only 12 carries and was cheered as he left the field. Prior to the event, the University of Texas did not want him to attend the game, but the USC players refused to play without him. He was shouted down and called the "N" word by some fans.

Roberts got a degree in business administration from what is now the Marshall School of Business.

== Professional career ==
After being drafted in the 14th round of the 1958 NFL draft by the New York Giants, Roberts opted instead to sign with the Toronto Argonauts of the "Big Four" (soon to be renamed the Eastern Conference) of the Canadian Football League, whose head coach was fellow Californian Hamp Pool. Forming what the Canadian Press called "the best all-round backfield in the Big Four" along with Dick Shatto and fellow rookie Dave Mann, Roberts rushed for 595 yards and five touchdowns, including touchdown runs of 67 and 85 yards.

After 10 games in double blue, however, he became a casualty of the 12-man import quota limiting the number of US players who could suit up for the Argos, and was released by Pool in favor of the more versatile Jim Rountree, a defensive standout.

Home in the United States, Roberts tried out in 1959 for the Pittsburgh Steelers, but failed to make the team. After being cut, he was picked up by the San Francisco 49ers and played for the team between 1959 and 1962.

== Life after football ==
Even during his NFL career, Roberts, who held a Masters of Business Administration degree, worked in the off-season as an independent building contractor.

== Death ==
Roberts died at a care facility in Norwalk, California, on July 11, 2023, at the age of 87.
