= Willie Buchanon =

American football player (born 1950)

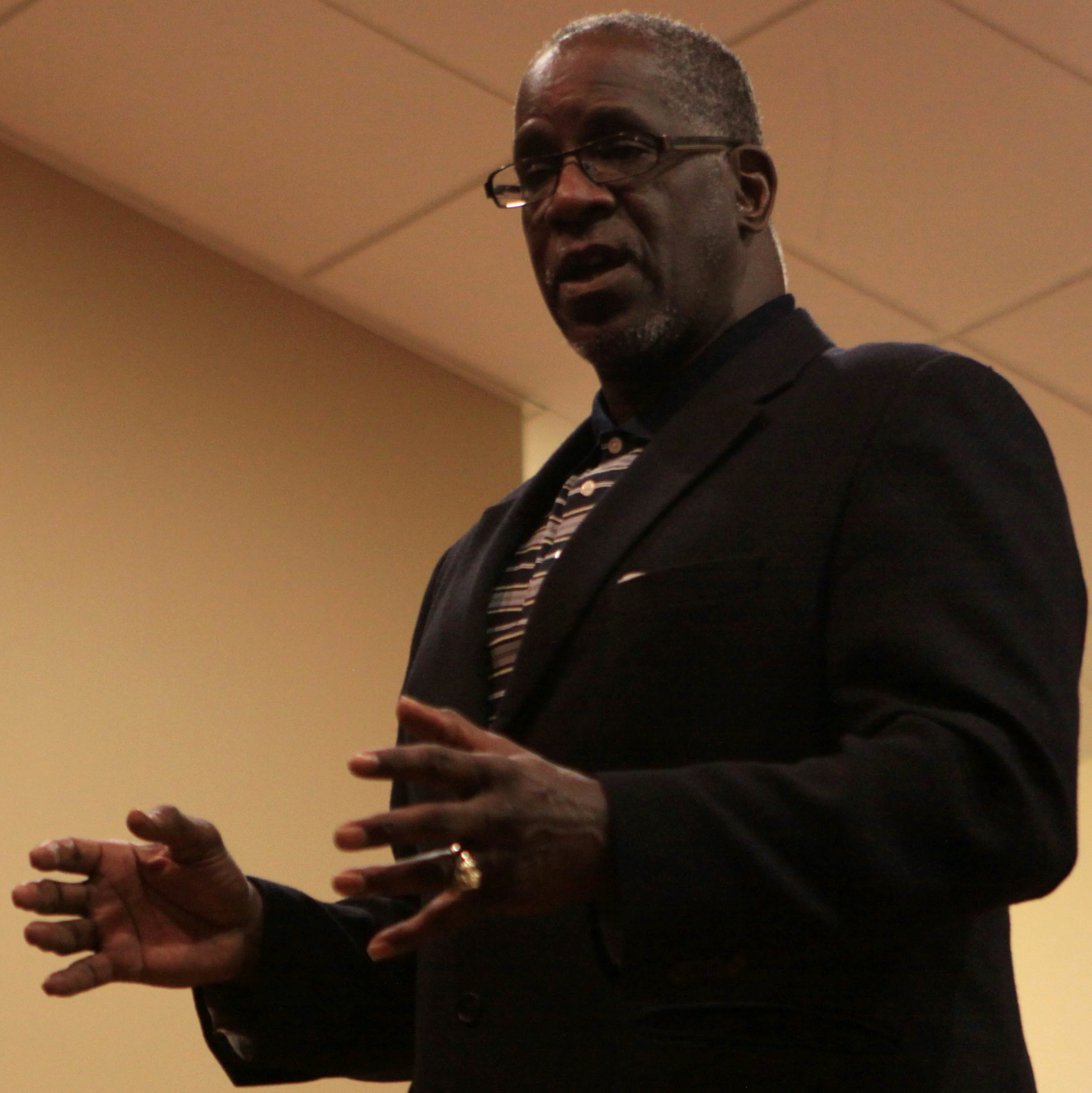
- Buchanon at MCB Camp Pendleton in 2011

No. 28
- Position: Cornerback

Personal information
- Born: November 4, 1950 (age 76); Oceanside, California, U.S.
- Listed height: 6 ft 0 in (1.83 m)
- Listed weight: 190 lb (86 kg)

Career information
- High school: Oceanside
- College: San Diego State
- NFL draft: 1972: 1st round, 7th overall pick

Career history
- Green Bay Packers (1972–1978); San Diego Chargers (1979–1982)

Awards and highlights
- First-team All-Pro (1978); 2× Pro Bowl (1974, 1978); NFL Defensive Rookie of the Year (1972); San Diego Chargers 50th Anniversary Team; Green Bay Packers Hall of Fame; Second-team All-American (1971); San Diego State Aztecs No. 28 retired; NFL record: Most passes intercepted in a single game: 4 (tied)

Career NFL statistics
- Interceptions: 28
- Interception yards: 278
- Touchdowns: 2
- Stats at Pro Football Reference

Willie James Buchanon (born November 4, 1950) is an American former professional football player who was a cornerback for the Green Bay Packers and San Diego Chargers of the National Football League (NFL). He played college football for the San Diego State Aztecs and was selected in the first round of the 1972 NFL draft with the seventh overall pick. He was Defensive Rookie of the Year in 1972 and a two-time Pro Bowl player. He finished his career with his hometown Chargers, retiring with 28 career interceptions and 15 fumble recoveries.

== Early life and college ==
Buchanon was born and raised in Oceanside, California, where he was a graduate of Oceanside High School. He attended Mira Costa College, where he was a Junior College All-American in 1969. Buchanon later played football and graduated from San Diego State University. He was voted the Most Valuable Player in the East-West Shrine Game of 1971. Sporting News named the San Diego State All-American to its All-Time collegiate team.

== Professional career ==
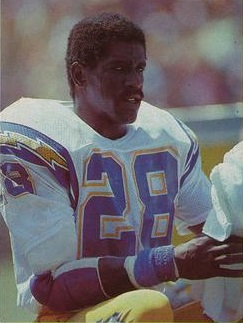
Buchanon c. 1980

Willie Buchanon was selected by Green Bay in the first round of the 1972 NFL draft, the seventh overall pick. He was the 1972 NFL AP Defensive Rookie of the Year and a one-time All-Pro. In 1978, the Packers defensive back led the NFC with 9 interceptions, including four on September 24, 1978, against the San Diego Chargers that tied him for the still-standing NFL record for most interceptions in a game, first set by Sammy Baugh in 1943. Buchanon spent his last four pro years with the San Diego Chargers, where he tied the NFL all-time record for most recoveries in a game in 1981.

== Awards and life after football ==
Buchanon was named to the Green Bay Packers All-Time team, Green Bay Packers Hall of Fame, San Diego State Hall of Fame, San Diego Hall of Champions, California State Junior College Hall of Fame and Oceanside High School Hall of Fame. He is now a realtor in San Diego.

== Personal life ==
Buchanon and his wife, Gwen, have two children: a daughter, Jenae, and a son, Will. His son was a member of the 2003 and 2004 national championship teams with the University of Southern California Trojans, and later played in the NFL. Willie Buchanon lives in his hometown of Oceanside.
