= Jordan Howlett =

American influencer

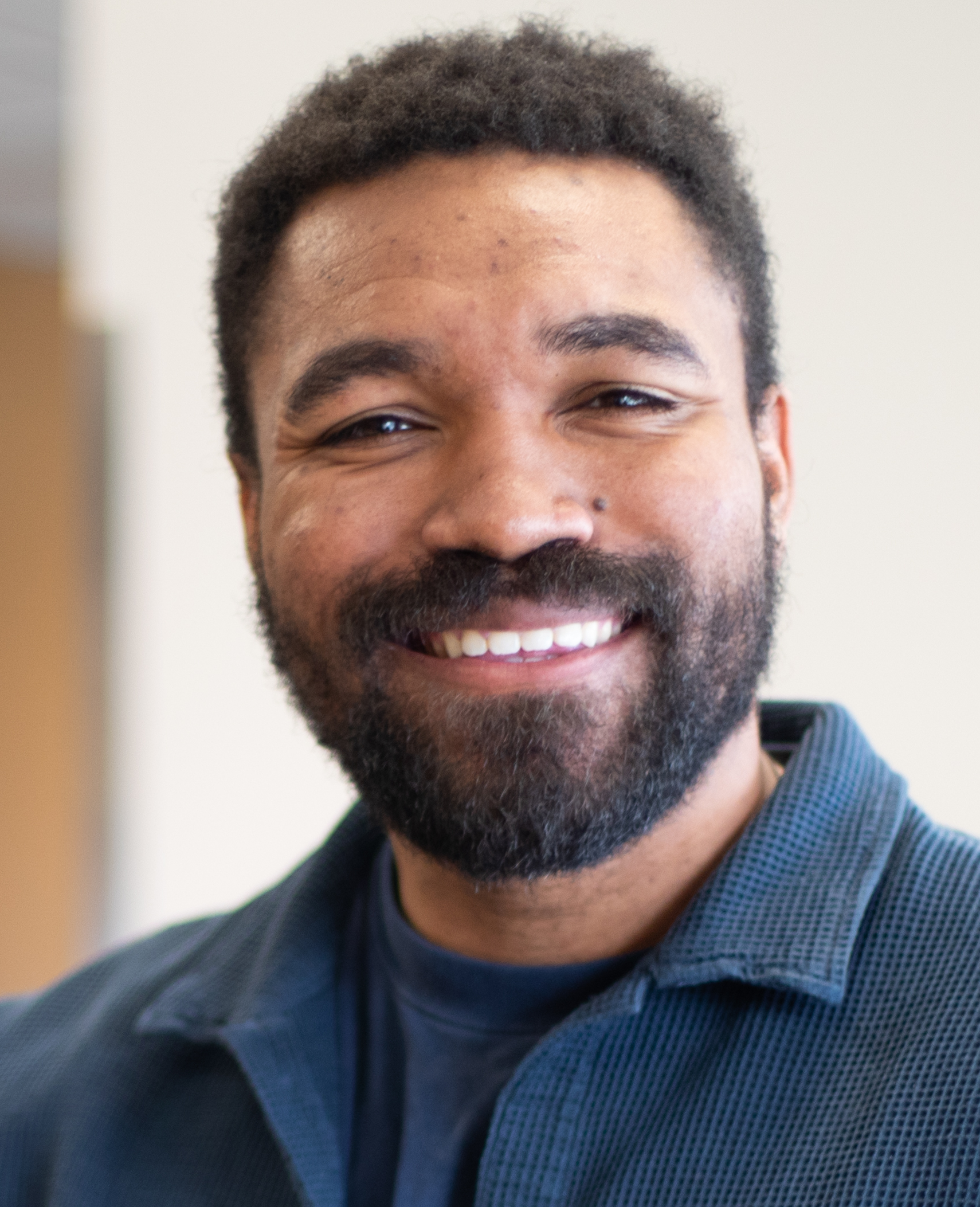
- Howlett in 2025
- Other name: Jordan the Stallion
- Occupations: Social media personality; actor
- Years active: 2018–present

Instagram information
- Page: jordan_the_stallion8
- Followers: 19 million

TikTok information
- Page: jordan_the_stallion8
- Followers: 20.1 million

YouTube information
- Channel: @jordan_the_stallion8
- Years active: 2018–present
- Subscribers: 5.42 million
- Views: 2.62 billion

Jordan Howlett, also known as Jordan the Stallion, is an American social media personality. Since 2018, he has been active on TikTok, posting comedic sketches, food-related commentary, and relatable monologues. He is known for his video series "Fast Food Secrets Club". As of 2026, he had over 19.7 million followers, and another 19.4 million on Instagram, where he shares similar content.

In his videos, he has collaborated with celebrities including Donald Glover, Kevin Hart, Tom Holland, Method Man, Will Smith, Channing Tatum, Michael B. Jordan, Shakira, Regé-Jean Page and Halle Berry. He has also appeared in national advertising campaigns for State Farm and Alaska Airlines. In 2024, he was featured on the Forbes Top Creators list and appeared in various media outlets.

== Early life ==
Howlett was raised in Oceanside, California, where he attended Oceanside High School. After graduating in 2015, he enrolled at College of the Desert before transferring to the University of California, Riverside. At UC Riverside, he made the baseball team as a walk-on and was later awarded an athletic scholarship.

Howlett faced financial hardship after high school and for a time slept in his car while seeking opportunities in baseball and education.

== Career ==
Howlett began posting content to TikTok in 2018, initially focusing on comedy sketches and relatable lifestyle commentary. Over time, he became known for humorous short-form videos that gave food-related insights. By November 2024, he had reached 90 million views per month and gained more than 32 million followers on TikTok and Instagram.

During the COVID-19 pandemic, Howlett began working in food service jobs before turning to content creation full-time. He gained attention for his "Fast Food Secrets Club" video series, in which he shares fast food preparation tips, ingredient breakdowns, and commentary on menu items. His videos are often filmed in a direct-to-camera format.

Howlett's online presence has led to appearances in national advertisements, including campaigns for State Farm and Alaska Airlines. He has also made public appearances such as throwing the ceremonial first pitch at a Chicago White Sox game in 2023 and attending the 2024 BET Awards.

In a 2024 interview, Howlett described his content philosophy as mixing authenticity and humor, as well as brand collaborations—including with Kevin Hart's Hart House.

== Content and style ==
Howlett often films his videos in a bathroom mirror, starting with the phrase "Come here". In many of his videos he tends to toss his glasses. His content primarily focuses on food tips, fast food "secrets", and simple recipes. He typically reacts to other TikTok videos or shares personal observations, often speaking slowly and using filler phrases such as "Does that make sense?"

Publisher	Year	Listicle	Result	Ref.
Forbes 30 Under 30	2025	Forbes 30 Under 30 – Social Media	27th	
Forbes	2024	Forbes Top Creators List 2024	43	
Times	2025	TIME100 Creators 2025		

== Personal life ==
Howlett resides in San Diego County, California. He has a brother.

== See also ==
- Internet celebrity – Person who has become famous through their use of the Internet
- Content creator – Contribution of information to any media
