= Sam Brenner =

American football player (born 1990)

No. 65, 67
- Position: Center

Personal information
- Born: April 27, 1990 (age 36); Oceanside, California, U.S.
- Listed height: 6 ft 4 in (1.93 m)
- Listed weight: 305 lb (138 kg)

Career information
- High school: Oceanside
- College: Utah (2009-2012)
- NFL draft: 2013: undrafted

Career history
- Miami Dolphins (2013–2015); Denver Broncos (2015–2016)

Awards and highlights
- Super Bowl champion (50); Second-team All-Pac-12 (2012)

Career NFL statistics
- Games played: 10
- Games started: 4
- Stats at Pro Football Reference

Samuel Callaghan Brenner (born April 27, 1990) is an American former professional football player who was a center in the National Football League (NFL). He played college football for the Utah Utes. Brenner was signed by the Miami Dolphins as an undrafted free agent in 2013.

== Early life ==
Brenner played high school football at Oceanside High School in California, where he was a two-time all-league selection and a second-team all-state selection as a senior in 2007. He was twice named his team's Most Valuable Offensive Lineman and played in the California All-Star Game following his senior season. He was named a scholar leader athlete by the Walter J Zable/ San Diego chapter of the National Football and College Hall of Fame. Additionally, he was a finalist in the county wide Silver Pigskin, the first offensive lineman ever so honored by the voting coaches and sports reporters. Brenner's team won the 2007 California Division II State Bowl.

As a college prospect, Brenner was ranked by Rivals.com as the No. 50 offensive guard in the country and the No. 88 overall prospect in the state of California.

== College career ==
Although Brenner signed with the University of Utah in 2008, he did not enroll until January 2009. As a true freshman, Brenner played primarily on special teams in all 13 games and added 53 snaps on offense. As a sophomore in 2010, Brenner served as the team's top backup offensive lineman and started at left tackle in the team's Las Vegas Bowl loss to Boise State.

Brenner started 12 games at right guard and one at tackle as a junior in 2011, grading out as the team's best offensive lineman in five games and ranking second on the team in total snaps despite exiting the season finale with a neck injury. As a senior in 2012, he started the first two games at right guard followed by 10 at left tackle, allowing just one sack on his way to second-team All-Pac-12 honors.

== Professional career ==
=== Pre-draft ===
At Utah's Pro Day prior to the 2013 NFL draft, Brenner ran a 5.03 40-yard dash and did 29 bench reps of 225 pounds. He was regarded as a late-round or undrafted prospect, drawing style comparisons to Zane Beadles and T. J. Lang.

=== Miami Dolphins ===
After going undrafted in the 2013 NFL draft, Brenner signed with the Miami Dolphins as an undrafted free agent. He entered his first pro training camp as the lone backup at center behind Mike Pouncey, facing competition from second-year guard Josh Samuda. He was released by the team during final cuts before the regular season and was re-signed to the practice squad on September 2. After 10 weeks on the practice squad, Brenner was promoted to the active roster, replacing offensive tackle Will Yeatman, who was placed on injured reserve with a torn anterior cruciate ligament, and providing depth at center with starter Mike Pouncey listed as questionable for the team's Week 11 contest with an illness.

On September 5, 2015, Brenner was waived by the Dolphins. On the following day, he was signed to the Dolphins' practice squad. On September 11, 2015, he was promoted to the Dolphins' active roster. On September 14, 2015, Brenner was waived by the Dolphins. On September 16, 2015, he was re-signed to the Dolphins' practice squad. On September 26, 2015, Brenner was promoted to the Dolphins active roster. On November 7, 2015, Brenner was waived by the Dolphins. On November 10, 2015, he was re-signed by the Dolphins. On November 17, 2015, Brenner was waived by the Dolphins.

=== Denver Broncos ===
On November 18, 2015, Brenner was claimed off waivers by the Denver Broncos.

In the 2015 season, the Broncos made Super Bowl 50, but Brenner was inactive for the game. The Broncos defeated the Carolina Panthers by a score of 24–10.

Brenner was placed on injured reserve on August 5, 2016.

== Personal life ==
Brenner is the son of Jim Brenner and Eileen Malik, who both served in the United States Marine Corps. Brenner's father swam collegiately at the University of Buffalo, while his mother played soccer and lacrosse at Castleton State college and college basketball at Cal State San Bernardino. Brenner is bilingual with Spanish being his second language.
