= PSAC men's basketball tournament =

Basketball tournament in Pennsylvania, US

Pennsylvania State Athletic Conference men's basketball tournament
- Conference basketball championship
- Sport: Basketball
- Conference: Pennsylvania State Athletic Conference
- Number of teams: 12
- Format: Single-elimination tournament
- Played: 1981–present
- Current champion: California (PA) (9th)
- Most championships: Cheyney (15)
- Official website: PSAC men's basketball

The Pennsylvania State Athletic Conference (PSAC) men's basketball tournament is the annual conference basketball championship tournament for the Pennsylvania State Athletic Conference. It is a single-elimination tournament and seeding is based on regular season records.

Between 1951 and 1960, the regular season champion was declared league champion based on record alone. From 1961 to 1980, a singular championship game was held between the top two teams from the regular season standings. Finally, a tournament (of varying sizes, presently at 12) has been held each year since 1981.

The winner receives the PSAC's automatic bid to the NCAA Men's Division II Basketball Championship.

== Results ==
=== Pre-tournament champions ===
- 1951 – Lock Haven State
- 1952 – Lock Haven State
- 1953 – Bloomsburg State
- 1954 – Millersville State
- 1955 – Millersville State
- 1956 – Millersville State
- 1957 – Millersville State
- 1958 – Millersville State
- 1959 – West Chester State
- 1960 – Indiana State (PA)

=== Championship game only ===
Year	Champions	Score	Runner-up
1961	Mansfield State	97–87	Indiana State (PA)
1962	Mansfield State	58–54	Edinboro State
1963	Slippery Rock State	74–73	Mansfield State
1964	Mansfield State	98–90	Edinboro State
1965	Cheyney State	73–47	Slippery Rock State
1966	Cheyney State	96–76	Edinboro State
1967	Cheyney State	84–57	California State (PA)
1968	Edinboro State	73–61	Cheyney State
1969	Cheyney State	83–69	Edinboro State
1970	California State (PA)	110–91	Cheyney State
1971	Cheyney State	90–65	Clarion State
1972	Cheyney State	97–88	Slippery Rock State
1973	Cheyney State	76–62	Clarion State
1974	Indiana State (PA)	79–69	Bloomsburg State
1975	Mansfield State	79–70	Edinboro State
1976	Cheyney State	78–77	Edinboro State
1977	Cheyney State	75–71	Clarion State
1978	Cheyney State	75–72	Slippery Rock State
1979	Cheyney State	72–71	Clarion State
1980	Cheyney State	66–59	Clarion State

=== Tournament championship game ===
Year	Champions	Score	Runner-up
1981	Bloomsburg State	72–63	Indiana State (PA)
1982	Cheyney State	68–50	Bloomsburg State
1983	Cheyney	63–55	Bloomsburg
1984	Mansfield	61–54	Bloomsburg
1985	California (PA)	81–79	Millersville
1986	Cheyney	90–67	Edinboro
1987	Millersville	100–94	California (PA)
1988	California (PA)	73–64	Kutztown
1989	Millersville	89–85	Bloomsburg
1990	East Stroudsburg	76–75 (OT)	Millersville
1991	Shippensburg	76–75 (2OT)	Slippery Rock
1992	California (PA)	92–76	Edinboro
1993	Millersville	97–84	California (PA)
1994	California (PA)	78–76	Indiana (PA)
1995	Indiana (PA)	87–69	California (PA)
1996	California (PA)	87–84	Indiana (PA)
1997	Mansfield	94–80	Clarion
1998	Edinboro	81–77	West Chester
1999	California (PA)	75–64	Bloomsburg
2000	Indiana (PA)	63–50	Slippery Rock
2001	Clarion	80–77 (OT)	West Chester
2002	Indiana (PA)	71–68	California (PA)
2003	Millersville	79–74	California (PA)
2004	Indiana (PA)	83–74	Kutztown
2005	Edinboro	85–76	Millersville
2006	Edinboro	52–51	Shippensburg
2007	Millersville	79–68	Cheyney
2008	California (PA)	73–65	Edinboro
2009	Gannon	80–65	Kutztown
2010	Indiana (PA)	84–73	Kutztown
2011	Indiana (PA)	82–75	Slippery Rock
2012	East Stroudsburg	90–85	West Chester
2013	Indiana (PA)	52–46	Slippery Rock
2014	East Stroudsburg	92–80	West Chester
2015	Gannon	69–66	Indiana (PA)
2016	Mercyhurst	70–67	West Chester
2017	Shippensburg	73–63	Kutztown
2018	East Stroudsburg	89–67	Gannon
2019	Indiana (PA)	56-49	Mercyhurst
2020	Indiana (PA)	77–59	Shippensburg
2022	Indiana (PA)	63-52	Millersville
2023	Indiana (PA)	54–53	Mercyhurst
2024	Gannon	89–74	California (PA)
2025	Gannon	74–58	Shepherd
2026	California (PA)	80–79	Gannon

== Championship records ==
School	Finals Record	Finals Appearances	Years
Cheyney	15–3	18	1965, 1966, 1967, 1969, 1971, 1972, 1973, 1976, 1977, 1978, 1979, 1980, 1982, 1983, 1986
Indiana (PA)	13–5	18	1960, 1974, 1995, 2000, 2002, 2004, 2010, 2011, 2013, 2019, 2020, 2022, 2023
Millersville	10–5	10	1954, 1955, 1956, 1957, 1958, 1987, 1989, 1993, 2003, 2007
California (PA)	9–7	16	1970, 1985, 1988, 1992, 1994, 1996, 1999, 2008, 2026
Mansfield	6–1	4	1961, 1962, 1964, 1975, 1984, 1997
East Stroudsburg	4–0	4	1990, 2012, 2014, 2018
Gannon	4–2	6	2009, 2015, 2024, 2025
Edinboro	4–9	13	1968, 1998, 2005, 2006
Bloomsburg	2–6	7	1953, 1981
Shippensburg	2–1	3	1991, 2017
Lock Haven	2–0	0	1951, 1952
Clarion	1–6	7	2001
Mercyhurst	1–1	2	2016
Slippery Rock	1–7	8	1963
West Chester	1–5	5	1959
Kutztown	0–5	5	
Shepherd	0–1	1	
Pitt–Johnstown	0–0	0	
Seton Hill	0–0	0	

- Schools highlighted in pink are former PSAC members.

== See also ==
- PSAC women's basketball tournament
