= Jordan Wynn =

American football player and coach (born 1990)

Biographical details
- Born: July 5, 1990 (age 36); Oceanside, California, U.S.
- Education: University of Utah

Playing career
- 2009–2012: Utah
- Position: Quarterback

Coaching career (HC unless noted)
- 2013–2014: Hawaii (QB)
- 2015: Fresno State (GA)

Accomplishments and honors

Awards
- Poinsettia Bowl Offensive MVP (2009)

Jordan Douglas Wynn (born July 5, 1990) is an American football coach and former college football quarterback. He previously served as quarterbacks coach under Norm Chow at Hawaii.

Wynn attended the University of Utah from 2009 to 2012. He began his career with arguably the best season ever by a Utah true freshman quarterback, completing 104-of-179 passes for 1,329 yards and eight touchdowns in just six games (five starts). He capped his true freshman season as the 2009 Poinsettia Bowl MVP, leading the Utes to a 37–27 victory over California.

Over the following years, Wynn was plagued by injuries, including a season-ending injury to his left (non-throwing) shoulder against Washington in game four of his junior season. He retired on September 10, 2012, after suffering his fourth shoulder injury in three years.

In November 2012, he was hired by Norm Chow as quarterbacks coach at Hawaii.

In September 2015, Wynn joined former Utah coach Dave Schramm's at Fresno State as an unpaid volunteer.
