= 2012 in basketball =

The following are the basketball events of the year 2012 throughout the world.

Tournaments include international (FIBA), professional (club) and amateur and collegiate levels.

== National team tournaments ==
=== 2012 Olympic Basketball Tournament ===
==== Men ====
- (gold) United States
- (silver) Spain
- (bronze) Russia

==== Women ====
- (gold) United States
- (silver) France
- (bronze) Australia

=== 2012 FIBA Under-17 World Championships ===
==== Men ====
- 2012 FIBA Under-17 World Championship in Lithuania:
  (gold) United States
  (silver) Australia
  (bronze) Croatia

==== Women ====
- 2012 FIBA Women's Under-17 World Championships in Netherlands:
  (gold) United States
  (silver) Spain
  (bronze) Canada

=== Other FIBA-sanctioned tournaments ===
Men:

- 2012 William Jones Cup in Taipei:
  (gold) Philippines
  (silver) (Iran) Mahram Tehran BC
  (bronze) United States

== Professional club seasons ==
=== Continental championships ===
Men:

- Euroleague:
  - (gold) (Greece) Olympiacos (silver) (Russia) CSKA Moscow (bronze) (Spain) FC Barcelona Regal
    - Euroleague MVP: (Russia) Andrei Kirilenko, CSKA Moscow
    - Euroleague Final Four MVP: (Greece) Vassilis Spanoulis, Olympiacos
    - Alphonso Ford Trophy (season's leading scorer): (North Macedonia) Bo McCalebb, (Italy) Montepaschi Siena
- Eurocup:
  - (gold) (Russia) Khimki (silver) (Spain) Valencia Basket (bronze) (Lithuania) Lietuvos rytas
- EuroChallenge:
  - (gold) (Turkey) Beşiktaş Milangaz (silver) (France) Élan Chalon (bronze) (Russia) Triumph Lyubertsy

Women:

- EuroLeague Women:
  - (gold) (Spain) Ros Casares Valencia (silver) (Spain) Rivas Ecópolis (bronze) (Russia) UMMC Ekaterinburg

=== Transnational seasons ===
==== Men ====
Region	League	Champion	Runners-up	Result	Playoff format
Southeast Asia	2011−12 ABL season	Indonesia Warriors	(Philippines) San Miguel Beermen	2−1	Best-of-3 series
Balkans	2011–12 BIBL season	(Israel) Hapoel Gilboa Galil	(Bulgaria) Levski Sofia	89−84 (OT)	One-game playoff
Baltic States	2011–12 Baltic Basketball League	(Lithuania) Zalgiris Kaunas	(Lithuania) Lietuvos rytas	74–70	One-game playoff
Former Yugoslavia	2011–12 ABA League	(Israel) Maccabi Tel Aviv	(Croatia) Cedevita Zagreb	87−77	One-game playoff
Eastern Europe	2011–12 VTB United League	(Russia) CSKA Moscow	(Russia) UNICS Kazan	74–62	One-game playoff
Australasia	2011–12 NBL season	New Zealand Breakers	(Australia) Perth Wildcats	2–1	Best-of-3 series

=== Domestic league seasons for men ===
Nation	Tournament	Champion	Runner-up	Result	Playoff format
Albania	2011–12 Albanian Basketball League	PBC Tirana	BC Kamza Basket	3–0	Best-of-5 series
Angola	2011–12 BAI Basket	Rec do Libolo	1° de Agosto	—	Double round-robin
Argentina	2011–12 Liga Nacional de Básquet season	Peñarol	Obras Sanitarias	4–2	Best-of-7 series
Austria	2011–12 Österreichische Basketball Bundesliga season	Xion Dukes Klosterneuburg	Allianz Swans Gmunden	3–1	Best-of-5 series
Australia*	2011–12 NBL season	New Zealand Breakers	Perth Wildcats	2–1	Best-of-3 series
Belarus	2011–12 Belarusian Basketball League	Minsk-2006	Grodno-93	97–74	Single-game final
Belgium	2011–12 Belgian Basketball League	Base Oostende	Spirou Charleroi	3–2	Best-of-5 series
Belgium	2012 Belgian Basketball Cup	Okapi Aalstar	Antwerp Giants	96–89 (OT)	Single-game final
Bosnia and Herzegovina	2011–12 Basketball Championship of Bosnia and Herzegovina	HKK Široki	KK Igokea	3–2	Best-of-5 series
Brazil	2011–12 NBB season	Brasília	São José Basketball	78–62	Single-game final
Bulgaria	2011–12 National Basketball League	Lukoil Academic	Levski Sofia	3–0	Best-of-5 series
Bulgaria	2012 Bulgarian Basketball Cup	Lukoil Academic	Levski Sofia	83–81	Single-game final
Canada	2011–12 NBL Canada season	London Lightning	Halifax Rainmen	3–2	Best-of-5 series
China	2011–12 CBA season	Beijing Ducks	Guangdong Southern Tigers	4–1	Best-of-7 series
Croatia	2011–12 A-1 League	Cibona Zagreb	Cedevita Zagreb	3–1	Best-of-5 series
Cyprus	2011–12 Cyprus Basketball Division A				
Czech Republic	2011–12 National Basketball League	ČEZ Nymburk	Prostějov	4–0	Best-of-7 series
Denmark	2011–12 Basketligaen	Bakken Bears	Svendborg Rabbits	4–2	Best-of-7 series
Estonia	2011–12 KML season	Kalev/Cramo	University of Tartu	4–0	Best-of-7 series
Finland	2011–12 Korisliiga season	Nilan Bisons Loimaa	Joensuun Kataja	3–1	Best-of-5 series
France	2011–12 Pro A season	Élan Chalon	Le Mans	95–76	Single-game final
France	2012 French Basketball Cup	Élan Chalon	Limoges CSP	83–75	Single-game final
France	2012 Leaders Cup	Élan Chalon	Gravelines	73–66	Single-game final
(Georgia (country)) Georgia	2011–12 Georgian Superliga				
Germany	2011–12 Basketball Bundesliga	Brose Baskets	Ratiopharm Ulm	3–1	Best-of-5 series
Germany	2012 BBL-Pokal	Brose Baskets	Telekom Baskets Bonn	82–73	Single-game final
(United Kingdom) Great Britain	2011–12 British Basketball League season	Newcastle Eagles	Leicester Riders	71–62	Single-game final
Greece	2011–12 Greek Basket League	Olympiacos	Panathinaikos	3–2	Best-of-5 series
Greece	2011–12 Greek Basketball Cup	Panathinaikos	Olympiacos	71–70	Single-game final
Hungary	2011–12 Nemzeti Bajnokság I/A				
Hungary	2012 Magyar Kupa	Szolnoki Olaj	Atomerőmű SE	85–75	Single-game final
Iceland	2011–12 Icelandic Premier League	Grindavík	Þór Þorl	3–1	Best-of-5 series
Indonesia	2011–12 NBL Indonesia	Satria Muda BritAma	Aspac Jakarta	59–42	Single-game final
Iran	2011–12 Iranian Basketball Super League	Mahram Tehran BC	Petrochimi Bandar Imam	3–0	Best-of-5 series
(Republic of Ireland) Ireland	2011–12 Irish Premier League				
Israel	2011–12 Israeli Basketball Super League	Maccabi Tel Aviv	Maccabi Ashdod	83–63	Single-game final
Israel	2011–12 Israeli Basketball State Cup	Maccabi Tel Aviv	Maccabi Rishon LeZion	82–69	Single-game final
Italy	2011–12 Lega Basket Serie A	~~Montepaschi Siena~~	EA7 Emporio Armani Milano	4–1	Best-of-7 series
Italy	2012 Italian Basketball Cup				
Kazakhstan	2011–12 Kazakhstan Basketball Championship				
Kazakhstan	2011–12 Kazakhstan Basketball Cup				
Kosovo	2011–12 Kosovo Basketball Superleague				
Latvia	2011–12 Latvian Basketball League	VEF Rīga	Ventspils	4–1	Best-of-7 series
Lithuania	2011–12 LKL season	Žalgiris	Lietuvos rytas	3–0	Best-of-5 series
(North Macedonia) Macedonia	2011–12 Macedonian First League				
Montenegro	2011–12 Prva A liga	KK Budućnost	KK Sutjeska	3–0	Best-of-5 series
Netherlands	2011–12 DBL season	EiffelTowers Den Bosch	ZZ Leiden	4–1	Best-of-7 series
Netherlands	2011–12 NBB Cup	ZZ Leiden	Magixx KidsRights	88–74	Single-game final
New Zealand	2012 New Zealand NBL season	Auckland Pirates	Wellington Saints	89–83	Single-game final
Philippines	2011–12 PBA Philippine Cup	Talk N' Text Tropang Texters	Powerade Tigers	4–1	Best-of-7 series
Philippines	2012 PBA Commissioner's Cup	B-Meg Llamados	Talk N' Text Tropang Texters	4–3	Best-of-7 series
Philippines	2012 PBA Governors' Cup	Rain or Shine Elasto Painters	B-Meg Llamados	4–3	Best-of-7 series
Philippines	2012 PBA D-League Foundation Cup	NLEX Road Warriors	Big Chill Super Chargers	2–0	Best-of-3 series
Puerto Rico	2011–12 BSN season	Indios de Mayagüez	Capitanes de Arecibo	4–1	Best-of-7 series
Poland	2011–12 Tauron Basket Liga	Asseco Prokom Gdynia	Trefl Sopot	4–3	Best-of-7 series
Portugal	2011–12 LPB season	Benfica	Porto	3–2	Best-of-5 series
Romania	2011–12 Liga Națională	Asesoft Ploieşti	Elba Timişoara	4–0	Best-of-7 series
Russia**	2011–12 PBL season	CSKA Moscow	BC Khimki	3–0	Best-of-5 series
Serbia	2011–12 Basketball League of Serbia	Partizan	Red Star	3–1	Best-of-5 series
Serbia	2011–12 Radivoj Korać Cup	Partizan mt:s	Crvena zvezda DIVA	64–51	Single-game final
Slovenia	2011–12 Slovenian Basketball League	Krka	Union Olimpija	3–1	Best-of-5 series
Spain	2011–12 ACB season	FC Barcelona Regal	Real Madrid	3–2	Best-of-5 series
Spain	2012 Copa del Rey de Baloncesto	Real Madrid	FC Barcelona Regal	91–74	Single-game final
Sweden	2011–12 Basketligan season	Norrköping Dolphins	Södertälje Kings	4–2	Best-of-7 series
Switzerland	2011–12 Championnat LNA season	Lugano Tigers	Unknown	No data available	
Taiwan	2011–12 Taiwan Super Basketball League	Pauilan Archiland	Dacin Tigers	No data available	
Turkey	2011–12 Turkish Basketball League	Beşiktaş Milangaz	Anadolu Efes	4–2	Best-of-7 series
Turkey	2011–12 Turkish Basketball Cup	Beşiktaş Milangaz	Banvit B.K.	78–74	Single-game final
Ukraine	2011–12 Ukrainian Basketball SuperLeague	Aviastar Donetsk	Musson Azovmash	4–0	Best-of-7 series
United States***	2011–12 NBA season	Miami Heat	Oklahoma City Thunder	4–1	Best-of-7 series
United States***	2012 NBA Europe Live Tour	FC Barcelona Regal	Dallas Mavericks	99–85	Single-game final

*Includes one team from New Zealand.

**Includes one team each from Belarus, Kazakhstan, and Latvia. The highest ranking team is also named as the Russian champions.

***Includes one team from Canada.

=== Domestic league seasons for women ===
- (United States) WNBA
  - Season:
    - Eastern Conference: Indiana Fever
    - Western Conference: Minnesota Lynx
  - Finals: The Fever defeat the Lynx 3–1 in the best-of-5 series.

=== College seasons for men ===
Nation	League / Tournament	Champions	Runners-up	Result	Playoff format
Canada	2012 CIS Men's Basketball Championships	Carleton Ravens	Alberta Golden Bears	86–67	Single-game final
Philippines	NCAA Season 88	San Beda Red Lions	Letran Knights	2–1	Best-of-three series
Philippines	UAAP Season 74	Ateneo Blue Eagles	UST Growling Tigers	2–0	Best-of-three series
Philippines	2012 Philippine Collegiate Champions League	UST Growling Tigers	Ateneo Blue Eagles	2–1	Best-of-three series
United States	NCAA Division I	Kentucky Wildcats	Kansas Jayhawks	67–59	Single-game final
United States	National Invitation Tournament	Stanford Cardinals	Minnesota Golden Gophers	75–51	Single-game final
United States	College Basketball Invitational	Pittsburgh Panthers	Washington State Cougars	2–1	Best-of-three series
United States	CollegeInsider.com Tournament	Mercer Bears	Utah State Aggies	70–67	Single-game final
United States	NCAA Division II	Western Washington	Montevallo	72–65	Single-game final
United States	NCAA Division III	Wisconsin–Whitewater	Cabrini College	63–60	Single-game final
United States	NAIA Division I	Concordia (California)	Oklahoma Baptist	72–69	Single-game final
United States	NAIA Division II	Oregon Institute of Technology	Northwood University	63–46	Single-game final

- (United States) NJCAA
  - Division I:
  - Division II:
  - Division III:

=== College seasons for women ===
- (United States) NCAA
  - Division I: Baylor 80, Notre Dame 61
    - Baylor becomes the first team in NCAA basketball history to win 40 games in a season.
    - Most Outstanding Player: Brittney Griner, Baylor
  - WNIT: Oklahoma State 75, James Madison 68
  - Women's Basketball Invitational:
  - Division II: Shaw 88, Ashland 82 (OT)
  - Division III: Illinois Wesleyan 57, George Fox 43
- (United States) NAIA
  - NAIA Division I:
  - NAIA Division II:
- (United States) NJCAA
  - Division I:Trinity Valley Community College 69, Hutchinson Community College 55
  - Division II:Monroe College 78, Lake Michigan College 73
  - Division III:Rock Valley College 82, Roxbury Community College 64
- (Philippines) UAAP Women's: FEU defeated La Salle in two games to win their second consecutive champion and finish an undefeated season.

=== Prep ===
- (United States) USA Today Boys Basketball Ranking #1:
- (United States) USA Today Girls Basketball Ranking #1:
- NCAA (Philippines) Juniors: San Beda Red Cubs defeated La Salle Green Hills Greenies 2+1–1 in the best-of-5 finals. Because San Beda were unbeaten in the elimination round, they were given a 1–0 series lead before finals play started.
- (Philippines) UAAP Juniors: NUNS Bullpups defeated FEU–D Baby Tamaraws 2–1 in the best-of-3 finals.

== Awards and honors ==
=== Naismith Memorial Basketball Hall of Fame ===
- Class of 2012:
  - Players: Mel Daniels, Katrina McClain, Reggie Miller, Ralph Sampson, Chet Walker, Jamaal Wilkes
  - Coaches: Lidia Alexeyeva, Don Nelson
  - Contributors: Don Barksdale, Phil Knight
  - Referees: Hank Nichols
  - Teams: All American Red Heads

=== Women's Basketball Hall of Fame ===
- Class of 2012
  - Nancy Fahey
  - Nikki McCray
  - Pamela McGee
  - Inge Nissen
  - Robin Roberts
  - Dawn Staley

=== Professional ===
- Men
  - NBA Most Valuable Player Award: LeBron James, Miami Heat
  - NBA Rookie of the Year Award: Kyrie Irving, Cleveland Cavaliers
  - NBA Defensive Player of the Year Award: Tyson Chandler, New York Knicks
  - NBA Sixth Man of the Year Award: James Harden, Oklahoma City Thunder
  - NBA Most Improved Player Award: Ryan Anderson, Orlando Magic
  - NBA Sportsmanship Award: Jason Kidd, Dallas Mavericks
  - NBA Coach of the Year Award: Gregg Popovich, San Antonio Spurs
  - J. Walter Kennedy Citizenship Award: Pau Gasol, Los Angeles Lakers
  - NBA Executive of the Year Award: Larry Bird, Indiana Pacers
  - FIBA Europe Player of the Year Award: Andrei Kirilenko, 2011–12 Minnesota Timberwolves
  - Euroscar Award:Andrei Kirilenko, 2011–12 Minnesota Timberwolves
  - NBA All-Star Game MVP:Kevin Durant, Oklahoma City Thunder
  - Chuck Daly Lifetime Achievement Award: Pat Riley, Miami Heat
- Women
  - WNBA Most Valuable Player Award: Tina Charles, Connecticut Sun
  - WNBA Defensive Player of the Year Award: Tamika Catchings, Indiana Fever
  - WNBA Rookie of the Year Award: Nneka Ogwumike, Los Angeles Sparks
  - WNBA Sixth Woman of the Year Award: Renee Montgomery, Connecticut Sun
  - WNBA Most Improved Player Award: Kristi Toliver, Los Angeles Sparks
  - Kim Perrot Sportsmanship Award: Kara Lawson, Connecticut Sun
  - WNBA Coach of the Year Award: Carol Ross, Los Angeles Sparks
  - FIBA Europe Player of the Year Award: Expected to be announced in February 2013.
  - WNBA Finals Most Valuable Player Award: Tamika Catchings, Indiana Fever

=== Collegiate ===
- Combined
  - Legends of Coaching Award: Geno Auriemma, Connecticut
- Men
  - John R. Wooden Award: Anthony Davis, Kentucky
  - Naismith College Coach of the Year: Bill Self, Kansas
  - Frances Pomeroy Naismith Award: Reggie Hamilton, Oakland
  - Associated Press College Basketball Player of the Year: Anthony Davis, Kentucky
  - NCAA basketball tournament Most Outstanding Player: Luke Hancock, Louisville
  - USBWA National Freshman of the Year: Anthony Davis, Kentucky
  - Associated Press College Basketball Coach of the Year: Frank Haith, Missouri
  - Naismith Outstanding Contribution to Basketball: Don Meyer
- Women
  - John R. Wooden Award: Brittney Griner, Baylor
  - Naismith College Player of the Year: Brittney Griner, Baylor
  - Naismith College Coach of the Year: Kim Mulkey, Baylor
  - Wade Trophy: Brittney Griner, Baylor
  - Frances Pomeroy Naismith Award: Tavelyn James, Eastern Michigan
  - Associated Press Women's College Basketball Player of the Year: Brittney Griner, Baylor
  - NCAA basketball tournament Most Outstanding Player: Brittney Griner, Baylor
  - Basketball Academic All-America Team: Elena Delle Donne, Delaware
  - Kay Yow Award: Karl Smesko, Florida Gulf Coast
  - Carol Eckman Award: Sue Ramsey, Ashland University
  - Maggie Dixon Award: Jennifer Hoover, High Point
  - USBWA National Freshman of the Year: Elizabeth Williams, Duke
  - Associated Press College Basketball Coach of the Year: Kim Mulkey, Baylor
  - List of Senior CLASS Award women's basketball winners: Nneka Ogwumike, Stanford
  - Nancy Lieberman Award: Skylar Diggins, Notre Dame
  - Naismith Outstanding Contribution to Basketball: Teresa Edwards

== Events ==
- April 18 – Tennessee Lady Volunteers coach Pat Summitt stepped down after 38 years and 8 NCAA championships. She was succeeded by assistant Holly Warlick.
- December 17 – Syracuse coach Jim Boeheim became the third NCAA Division I men's coach with 900 career wins following the Orange's 72–68 win over Detroit. He had been preceded to 900 wins by Bob Knight and current leader Mike Krzyzewski.

== Movies ==
- Benji – A documentary about the life and 1984 murder of Chicago high school superstar Ben Wilson.
- The Other Dream Team – A documentary about the 1992 Lithuanian Olympic basketball team.
- Thunderstruck

== Deaths ==
- January 3 — Gene Bartow, American college coach (Memphis State, UCLA, UAB), and member of the National Collegiate Basketball Hall of Fame (born 1930)
- January 5 — Alexander Sizonenko, Russian basketball player (born 1959)
- January 10 — Jack Heron, American college coach (Sacramento State) (born 1926)
- January 11 — Wally Osterkorn, NBA player (Syracuse Nationals) (born 1928)
- January 23 — Larry Striplin, American college coach (Belmont) (born 1929)
- January 28 — Joseph Curran, American college coach (Canisius) (born 1922)
- February 1 — Charlie Spoonhour, American college coach (Saint Louis and others) (born 1939)
- February 1 — Jerry Steiner, American National Basketball League player (Indianapolis Kautskys, Fort Wayne Zollner Pistons) (born 1918)
- February 8 — Lew Hitch, NBA player (Minneapolis Lakers, Milwaukee Hawks) (born 1929)
- February 16 — Gene Vance, BAA/NBA player (Chicago Stags, Milwaukee Hawks) (born 1923)
- February 25 — Dick Davies, gold medal-winning player for Team USA at the 1964 Summer Olympics (born 1936)
- February 26 — Zollie Volchok, NBA Executive (Seattle SuperSonics) (born 1916)
- March 8 — Charlie Hoag, 1952 Olympic Gold Medal winner and National Champion at Kansas (born 1931)
- March 12 — Dick Harter, American coach (Charlotte Hornets, University of Oregon) (born 1930)
- March 16 — Ed Dahler, NBA player (Philadelphia Warriors) (born 1926)
- March 24 — Pete McCaffrey, gold medal-winning player for Team USA at the 1964 Summer Olympics (born 1938)
- April 11 — Tippy Dye, American college coach (Brown, Ohio State, Washington) (born 1915)
- April 11 — Bob Lewis, National champion at Utah (born 1925)
- April 15 — Dwayne Schintzius, NBA player (San Antonio Spurs, New Jersey Nets, among others) (born 1968)
- April 15 — Bob Wright, high school and college coach (Morehead State) (born 1926)
- April 30 — Andrew Levane, NBA player and coach (New York Knicks) (born 1920)
- April 30 — Frank Zummach, NBL coach (Sheboygan Red Skins) (born 1911)
- May 1 — Greg Jackson, NBA player (New York Knicks, Phoenix Suns) (born 1952)
- May 6 — Pat Frink, NBA player (Cincinnati Royals) (born 1945)
- May 13 — Nolan Richardson III, American college coach (Tennessee State) (born 1964)
- May 26 — Lou Watson, American college coach (Indiana) (born c. 1924)
- May 28 — Ed Burton, NBA player (New York Knicks, St. Louis Hawks) (born 1939)
- May 30 — Jack Twyman, Naismith Hall of Fame NBA player (Cincinnati Royals) (born 1934)
- May 31 — Orlando Woolridge, NBA player (Los Angeles Lakers, among others) (born 1959)
- June 2 — LeRoy Ellis, NBA player (Los Angeles Lakers, among others) (born 1940)
- June 4 — Jim Fitzgerald, NBA owner (Milwaukee Bucks, Golden State Warriors) (born 1926)
- June 7 — Chuck Share, NBA player (St. Louis Hawks, among others) (born 1927)
- June 7 — Mervin Jackson, ABA player (Utah Stars) (born 1946)
- June 8 — Pete Brennan, NBA player (New York Knicks) (born 1936)
- June 14 — Dick Acres, 78, American college coach (Oral Roberts).
- June 18 — Dennis Hamilton, NBA/ABA player (Los Angeles Lakers, among others) (born 1944)
- June 24 — Heino Kruus, Olympic Silver medalist for the Soviet Union in 1952. (born 1926)
- June 24 — Ted Luckenbill, NBA player (San Francisco Warriors). (born 1939)
- June 26 — Pat Cummings, NBA player (New York Knicks, Miami Heat). (born 1956)
- June 26 — Jack Hewson, BAA player (Boston Celtics). (born 1924)
- June 28 — Herb Scherer, NBA player (Tri-Cities Blackhawks, New York Knicks). (born 1929)
- July 9 — Kenny Heitz, three-time NCAA champion at UCLA. (born 1947)
- July 13 — Warren Jabali, ABA player (Oakland Oaks, among others). (born 1946)
- July 26 — Neil Reed, College player (Indiana, Southern Miss) (born 1975)
- August 2 — Ruy de Freitas, Olympic Bronze medalist for Brazil in 1948. (born 1916)
- August 3 — John Pritchard, NBA player (Waterloo Hawks) and Washington Generals player (born 1927)
- August 4 — Arnie Risen, Naismith Hall of Fame NBA player (Rochester Royals, Boston Celtics) (born 1924)
- August 6 — Dan Roundfield, ABA and NBA player (Atlanta Hawks, among others) (born 1953)
- August 17 — Pál Bogár, Hungarian Olympic player (born 1927)
- August 27 — Art Heyman, NBA and ABA player (New York Knicks, among others) (born 1941)
- September 21 — Ed Conlin, NBA player (Syracuse Nationals, Philadelphia Warriors, Detroit Pistons) (born 1933)
- September 29 — Bob Stevens, college coach (Oklahoma, South Carolina) (born 1924)
- October 8 — Donnie Butcher, NBA player (New York Knicks, Detroit Pistons) and coach (Detroit Pistons) (born 1936)
- October 9 — Kenny Rollins, NBA player, college national champion at Kentucky, Olympic gold medalist in 1948 (born 1923)
- October 12 — Ervin Kassai, Hungarian referee, FIBA Hall of Fame member (born 1925)
- October 18 — Slater Martin, Naismith Hall of Fame player, five-time NBA champion (Minneapolis Lakers, St. Louis Hawks) (born 1925)
- October 30 — Dan Tieman, NBA player (Cincinnati Royals) (born 1940)
- November 13 — Murray Arnold, college and professional coach (Chattanooga, Perth Wildcats) (born 1938)
- November 25 — Carlisle Towery, American National Basketball League player (Fort Wayne Pistons) (born 1920)
- December 1 — John Crigler, national championship college player at Kentucky (1958) (born 1936)
- December 1 — Rick Majerus, college coach (Saint Louis, Utah, Ball State, Marquette) (born 1948)
- December 4 — Ken Trickey, college coach (Middle Tennessee, Oral Roberts, Oklahoma City, Iowa State) (born 1933)
- December 7 — Nikola Ilić, Serbian player (born 1985)
- December 12 — Walt Kirk, American NBA player (Tri-Cities Blackhawks, among others) (born 1924)
- December 20 — Jerome Whitehead, American NBA player (San Diego Clippers, Golden State Warriors, among others) (born 1956)
- December 22 — Charles Cleveland, American college player (Alabama Crimson Tide) (born 1951)
- December 28 — Dan Kraus, American BAA player (Baltimore Bullets) (born 1923)
- December 28 — Fred Rehm, American NBL player (Oshkosh All-Stars), NCAA champion at Wisconsin (1941) (born 1921)
- December 29 — Erv Staggs, American ABA player (Miami Floridians) (born 1948)

== See also ==
- Timeline of women's basketball
