= 2012 National Invitation Tournament =

Annual NCAA basketball competition

- 2012 NIT Logo
- Season: 2011–12
- Teams: 32
- Finals site: Madison Square Garden, New York City
- Champions: Stanford Cardinal (2nd title)
- Runner-up: Minnesota Golden Gophers (4th title game)
- Semifinalists: Washington Huskies (1st semifinal); Massachusetts Minutemen (3rd semifinal)
- Winning coach: Johnny Dawkins (1st title)
- MVP: Aaron Bright (Stanford)

The 2012 National Invitation Tournament was a single-elimination tournament of 32 NCAA Division I teams that were not selected to participate in the 2012 NCAA tournament. The annual tournament began on March 13 on campus sites and ended on March 29 at Madison Square Garden. Stanford defeated Minnesota in the final game, by a score of 75–51 to become NIT champions for second time (first since 1991).

== Participants ==
=== Automatic qualifiers ===
The following teams were automatic qualifiers for the 2012 NIT field by virtue of winning their conferences' regular season championship but failing to win their conference tournament. These teams also did not receive an at-large bid for the NCAA tournament.

Team	Conference	Record	Appearance	Last bid
Akron	MAC	22–11	5th	2008
Bucknell	Patriot League	24–9	1st	Never
Drexel	Colonial	27–6	7th	2007
Middle Tennessee	Sun Belt	25–6	3rd	1988
Nevada	WAC	26–6	5th	2010
Oral Roberts	Summit	27–6	8th	2005
Savannah State	MEAC	21–11	1st	Never
Stony Brook	America East	22–9	2nd	2010
Texas–Arlington	Southland	24–8	2nd	1981
Valparaiso	Horizon	22–11	2nd	2003
Washington	Pac-12	21–10	6th	1997

=== At-large bids ===
The following 21 teams were also awarded NIT berths.

Team	Conference	Record	Appearance	Last bid
Arizona	Pac-12	23–11	4th	1951
Cleveland State	Horizon	22–10	5th	2011
Dayton	Atlantic 10	20–12	24th	2011
Illinois State	Missouri Valley	20–13	12th	2010
Iowa	Big Ten	17–16	6th	2004
La Salle	Atlantic 10	21–12	12th	1991
LSU	SEC	18–14	6th	2004
Marshall	C-USA	22–13	6th	1988
Miami (FL)	ACC	19–12	11th	2011
Minnesota	Big Ten	19–14	14th	2008
Mississippi State	SEC	21–11	8th	2010
Northern Iowa	Missouri Valley	19–13	1st	Never
Northwestern	Big Ten	18–13	7th	2011
Ole Miss	SEC	20–13	11th	2011
Oregon	Pac-12	22–9	10th	2004
Saint Joseph's	Atlantic 10	20–13	15th	2006
Seton Hall	Big East	20–12	17th	2010
Stanford	Pac-12	21–11	6th	2006
Tennessee	SEC	18–14	12th	2004
UCF	C-USA	22–10	1st	Never
UMass	Atlantic 10	22–11	12th	2008

=== Seeds ===
Washington Bracket
Seed	School	Conference	Record	Berth type
1	Washington	Pac-12	21–10	Automatic
2	Dayton	Atlantic 10	20–12	At-large
3	Oregon	Pac-12	22–9	At-large
4	Northwestern	Big Ten	18–13	At-large
5	Akron	MAC	22–11	Automatic
6	LSU	SEC	18–14	At-large
7	Iowa	Big Ten	17–16	At-large
8	UT-Arlington	Southland	24–8	Automatic

Seton Hall Bracket
Seed	School	Conference	Record	Berth type
1	Seton Hall	Big East	20–12	At-large
2	Saint Joseph's	Atlantic 10	20–13	At-large
3	Drexel	Colonial	27–6	Automatic
4	Mississippi State	SEC	21–11	At-large
5	UMass	Atlantic 10	22–11	At-large
6	UCF	Conference USA	22–10	At-large
7	Northern Iowa	Missouri Valley	19–13	At-large
8	Stony Brook	America East	22–9	Automatic

Tennessee Bracket
Seed	School	Conference	Record	Berth type
1	Tennessee	SEC	18–14	At-large
2	Miami (FL)	ACC	19–12	At-large
3	La Salle	Atlantic 10	21–12	At-large
4	Middle Tennessee	Sun Belt	25–6	Automatic
5	Marshall	Conference USA	21–13	At-large
6	Minnesota	Big Ten	19–14	At-large
7	Valparaiso	Horizon	22–11	Automatic
8	Savannah State	MEAC	21–11	Automatic

Arizona Bracket
Seed	School	Conference	Record	Berth type
1	Arizona	Pac-12	23–11	At-large
2	Mississippi	SEC	20–13	At-large
3	Stanford	Pac-12	21–11	At-large
4	Oral Roberts	Summit	27–6	Automatic
5	Nevada	WAC	26–6	Automatic
6	Cleveland State	Horizon	22–10	At-large
7	Illinois State	Missouri Valley	20–13	At-large
8	Bucknell	Patriot	24–9	Automatic

== Bracket ==
Played on the home court of the higher-seeded team except #7 seed Iowa hosts #2 seed Dayton since Dayton is the host of the NCAA First Four and cannot host a first-round NIT game.

First round March 13–14
1	Washington	82
8	UT Arlington	72
4	Northwestern	76
5	Akron	74
3	Oregon	96
6	LSU	76
2	Dayton	72
7	Iowa	84

Second round March 16–19
1	Washington	76
4	Northwestern	55
3	Oregon	108
7	Iowa	97

Quarterfinals; March 20–21; ESPN
1	Washington	90
3	Oregon	86

First round March 13–14
1	Tennessee	65
8	Savannah State	51
4	Middle Tennessee	86
5	Marshall	78
3	La Salle	61
6	Minnesota	70
2	Miami (FL)	66
7	Valparaiso	50

Second round March 16–19
1	Tennessee	64
4	Middle Tennessee	71
6	Minnesota	78
2	Miami (FL)	60

Quarterfinals; March 20–21; ESPN
4	Middle Tennessee	72
6	Minnesota	78

First round March 13–14
1	Seton Hall	63
8	Stony Brook	61
4	Mississippi State	96
5	UMass	101^{2OT}
3	Drexel	81
6	UCF	56
2	Saint Joseph's	65
7	Northern Iowa	67

Second round March 16–19
1	Seton Hall	67
5	UMass	77
3	Drexel	65
7	Northern Iowa	63

Quarterfinals; March 20–21; ESPN2
5	UMass	72
3	Drexel	70

First round March 13–14
1	Arizona	54
8	Bucknell	65
4	Oral Roberts	59
5	Nevada	68
3	Stanford	76
6	Cleveland State	65
2	Ole Miss	93
7	Illinois State	96^{OT}

Second round March 16–19
8	Bucknell	67
5	Nevada	75
3	Stanford	92^{OT}
7	Illinois State	88

Quarterfinals; March 20–21; ESPN2
5	Nevada	56
3	Stanford	84

=== Semifinals and final ===
Played at Madison Square Garden in New York City on March 27 and March 29

Semifinals; March 27; ESPN2
1	Washington	67
6	Minnesota	68^{OT}
5	UMass	74
3	Stanford	84

Championship; March 29; ESPN
6	Minnesota	51
3	Stanford	75

== See also ==
- 2012 Women's National Invitation Tournament
- 2012 NCAA Division I men's basketball tournament
- 2012 NCAA Division II men's basketball tournament
- 2012 NCAA Division III men's basketball tournament
- 2012 NCAA Division I women's basketball tournament
- 2012 NCAA Division II women's basketball tournament
- 2012 NCAA Division III women's basketball tournament
- 2012 NAIA Division I men's basketball tournament
- 2012 NAIA Division II men's basketball tournament
- 2012 NAIA Division I women's basketball tournament
- 2012 NAIA Division II women's basketball tournament
- 2012 College Basketball Invitational
- 2012 CollegeInsider.com Postseason Tournament
