= Williams Center =

Williams Center or The Williams Center may refer to:

- The Williams Center (theater), a performing arts center and cinema complex in Rutherford, New Jersey
- Williams Center, Ohio, an unincorporated community in Center Township, Ohio
- Williams Center (sports facility), a sports facility at the University of Wisconsin–Whitewater
- BOK Tower, a skyscraper in Tulsa, Oklahoma formerly known as One Williams Center
