= 2012 NCAA Division III women's basketball tournament =

- Teams: 64
- Finals site: DeVos Fieldhouse, Holland, Michigan
- Champions: Illinois Wesleyan Titans (1st title)
- Runner-up: George Fox Bruins (2nd title game)
- Third place: St. Thomas (MN) Tommies (5th Final Four)
- Fourth place: Amherst Lord Jeffs (4th Final Four)
- Winning coach: Mia Smith (1st title)
- MOP: Olivia Lett (Illinois Wesleyan)
- Attendance: 23,593

The 2012 NCAA Division III women's basketball tournament was the 31st annual tournament hosted by the NCAA to determine the national champion of Division III women's collegiate basketball in the United States.

Illinois Wesleyan defeated George Fox in the championship game, 57–48, to claim the Titans' first Division III national title.

The championship rounds were hosted by Hope College at the DeVos Fieldhouse in Holland, Michigan.

== Bracket ==
=== Top left sectional ===
First round March 2, 2012; Regional sites
Amherst	84
St. Joseph's Brooklyn	30
Amherst, MA
Babson	68
Bridgewater State	59
Juniata	84
Castleton	57
Huntingdon, PA
Saint Vincent	66
York (PA)	86
Rhode Island College	69
Baruch	54
Providence, RI
Hartwick	61
Emmanuel (MA)	68
William Paterson	79
Salve Regina	44
Wilkes-Barre, PA
King's (PA)	56
Oneonta State	42

Second round March 3, 2012; Regional sites
Amherst	61
Babson	48
Juniata	81
York (PA)	90
Rhode Island College	52
Emmanuel (MA)	57
William Patterson	63
King's (PA)	64

Sectional semifinals March 9, 2012; Amherst, MA
Amherst	79
York (PA)	55
Emmanuel (MA)	67
King's (PA)	56

Sectional finals March 10, 2012; Amherst, MA
Amherst	84
Emmanuel (MA)	61

=== Bottom left sectional ===
First round March 2, 2012; Regional sites
Mary Washington	39
Keuka	32
Fredericksburg, VA
Messiah	73
Kean	50
Lebanon Valley	73
Vassar	68
Annville, PA
Mount Saint Mary	63
Gwynedd Mercy	62
Ithaca	84
Elms	37
Ithaca, NY
Southern Maine	68
Bowdoin	75
George Fox	58
Cal Lutheran	35
Newberg, OR
Lewis & Clark	83
Concordia Texas	65

Second round March 3, 2012; Regional sites
Mary Washington	53
Messiah	50
Lebanon Valley	70
Mount Saint Mary	53
Ithaca	51
Bowdoin	55
George Fox	52
Lewis & Clark	50

Sectional semifinals March 9, 2012; Fredericksburg, VA
Mary Washington	46
Lebanon Valley	41
Bowdoin	55
George Fox	71

Sectional finals March 10, 2012; Fredericksburg, VA
Mary Washington	45
George Fox	68

=== Top right sectional ===
First round March 2, 2012; Regional sites
DePauw	66
Westminster (MO)	46
Greencastle, IN
UW Whitewater	68
Carthage	74
Centre	59
Guilford	47
Danville, KY
Washington St. Louis	79
Ferrum	64
Thomas More	94
Louisiana College	91
Crestview Hills, KY
Maryville (TN)	42
Illinois Wesleyan	84
Mount Union	73
La Roche	63
Alliance, OH
Muhlenberg	63
Catholic	54

Second round March 3, 2012; Regional sites
DePauw	48
Carthage	53
Centre (KY)	57
Washington St. Louis	55
Thomas More	50
Illinois Wesleyan	87
Mount Union	61
Muhlenberg	55

Sectional semifinals March 9, 2012; Alliance, OH
Carthage	71
Centre (KY)	61
Illinois Wesleyan	70
Mount Union	69

Sectional finals March 10, 2012; Alliance, OH
Carthage	69
Illinois Wesleyan	77

=== Bottom right sectional ===
First round March 2, 2012; Regional sites
St. Thomas (MN)	71
Martin Luther	58
St. Paul, MN
Coe	72
UW River Falls	61
Tufts	61
Misericordia	57
Medford, MA
Johns Hopkins	53
UNE	51
Calvin	59
Wisconsin Lutheran	47
Grand Rapids, MI
UW Stevens Point	61
Franklin	58
Chicago	75
Monmouth (IL)	68
Chicago, IL
Simpson	61
UW Eau Claire	69

Second round March 3, 2012; Regional sites
St. Thomas (MN)	51
Coe	45
Tufts	55
Johns Hopkins	46
Calvin	76
UW Stevens Point	71
Chicago	56
UW Eau Claire	52

Sectional semifinals March 9, 2012; New York, NY
St. Thomas (MN)	50
Tufts	47
Calvin	68
Chicago	50

Sectional finals March 10, 2012; New York, NY
St. Thomas (MN)	83
Calvin	72

=== Final Four ===
Final Four; March 16, 2012; DeVos Fieldhouse; Holland, MI
Amherst	69
George Fox	76
Illinois Wesleyan	67
St. Thomas (MN)	53

National championship March 17, 2012; DeVos Fieldhouse; Holland, MI
George Fox	48
Illinois Wesleyan	57
Third place
Amherst	60
St. Thomas (MN)	87

== All-tournament team ==
- Olivia Lett, Illinois Wesleyan
- Hannah Munger, George Fox
- Keisha Gordon, George Fox
- Caroline Stedman, Amherst
- Maggie Weiers, St. Thomas (MN)

== See also ==
- 2012 NCAA Division I women's basketball tournament
- 2012 NCAA Division II women's basketball tournament
- 2012 NAIA Division I women's basketball tournament
- 2012 NAIA Division II women's basketball tournament
- 2012 NCAA Division III men's basketball tournament
