= 2012 NAIA Division I women's basketball tournament =

- Teams: 32
- Finals site: Frankfort Convention Center, Frankfort, Kentucky
- Champions: Oklahoma City Stars (6th title, 9th title game, 11th Fab Four)
- Runner-up: Union University Bulldogs (9th title game, 13th Fab Four)
- Semifinalists: Georgetown Tigers (1st Fab Four); Lubbock Christian Lady Chaps (2nd Fab Four)
- Coach of the year: Rob Edmisson (Oklahoma City)
- Player of the year: Lavanda Ross (Union (TN))
- Charles Stevenson Hustle Award: Abby Ballman (Shawnee State)
- Chuck Taylor MVP: Taylor Booze (Oklahoma City)
- Top scorer: Robyn Foster (Shorter) (41 points)

The 2012 NAIA Division I women's basketball tournament was the tournament held by the NAIA to determine the national champion of women's college basketball among its Division I members in the United States and Canada for the 2011–12 basketball season.

Oklahoma City defeated Union (TN) in the championship game, 69–48, to claim the Stars' sixth NAIA national title and first since 2002.

The tournament was played at the Frankfort Convention Center in Frankfort, Kentucky, the first venue change for the event since 1990.

== Qualification ==
The tournament field remained fixed at thirty-two teams, which were sorted into four quadrants of eight teams each. Within each quadrant, teams were seeded sequentially from one to eight based on record and season performance.

The tournament continued to utilize a simple single-elimination format.

== Bracket ==
First round
1	Oklahoma City	91
8	Our Lady of the Lake	73
5	Belhaven	49
4	Westminster (UT)	75
3	Azusa Pacific	77*
6	MidAmerica Nazarene	72
7	William Woods	47
2	Shawnee State	68
2	Lubbock Christian	79
7	LSU Shreveport	55
6	Loyola New Orleans	63
3	Lewis–Clark State	74
4	Saint Xavier	75
5	Campbellsville	57
8	Lyon (AR)	57
1	Westmont	59
1	Freed–Hardeman	82
8	Avila	84**
5	Georgetown (KY)	70
4	Vanguard	68
3	Olivet Nazarene	83
6	Shorter	84
7	Rogers State	80*
2	Cumberlands (KY)	73
2	Lee (TN)	66
7	Biola	69
6	Columbia (MO)	64
3	Langston	76
4	Xavier Louisiana	74
5	Southern Nazarene	67
8	Lindsey Wilson	50
1	Union (TN)	63

Second round
1	Oklahoma City	76
4	Westminster (UT)	47
3	Azusa Pacific	67
2	Shawnee State	61
2	Lubbock Christian	70
3	Lewis–Clark State	61
4	Saint Xavier	56
1	Westmont	70
8	Avila	71
5	Georgetown (KY)	80
6	Shorter	59
7	Rogers State	64
7	Biola	73
3	Langston	58
4	Xavier Louisiana	43
1	Union (TN)	58

Quarterfinals
1	Oklahoma City	78
3	Azusa Pacific	61
2	Lubbock Christian	66
1	Westmont	61
5	Georgetown (KY)	70
7	Rogers State	63
7	Biola	52
1	Union (TN)	74

Semifinals
1	Oklahoma City	85
2	Lubbock Christian	55
5	Georgetown (KY)	50
1	Union (TN)	62

National championship
1	Oklahoma City	69
1	Union (TN)	48

== See also ==
- 2012 NAIA Division I men's basketball tournament
- 2012 NCAA Division I women's basketball tournament
- 2012 NCAA Division II women's basketball tournament
- 2012 NCAA Division III women's basketball tournament
- 2012 NAIA Division II women's basketball tournament
