= 2012 NAIA Division II men's basketball tournament =

College basketball tournament

- Logo for the 2012 national championship
- Teams: 32
- Finals site: Keeter Gymnasium, Point Lookout, Missouri
- Champions: Oregon Tech Owls (3rd title, 4th title game, 5th Fab Four)
- Runner-up: Northwood Timberwolves (1st title game, 2nd Fab Four)
- Semifinalists: Davenport Panthers (1st Fab Four); McPherson Bulldogs (1st Fab Four)
- Charles Stevenson Hustle Award: Kyle Gomez (Oregon Tech)
- Chuck Taylor MVP: Bobby Hunter (Oregon Tech)
- Top scorer: Jordan Call (Northwest (WA)) (66 points)

The 2012 NAIA Division II men’s basketball national championship was held in March at Keeter Gymnasium in Point Lookout, Missouri. The 21st annual NAIA basketball tournament featured 32 teams playing in a single-elimination format.

== Awards and honors ==
- Leading scorer:
- Leading rebounder:

== Bracket ==
First round March 7–8	Second round March 9
1	Northwood (FL) (30-3)	67
--	College of the Ozarks (MO) (14-16)	50
1	Northwood (FL) (31-3)	62
--	Marian (IN) (20-10)	54
--	Marian (IN) (19-10)	75*
16	St. Ambrose (IA) (25-9)	72
1st SEED TIER; March 7
9	Northwestern (IA) (25-6)	95
--	Tennessee Wesleyan (24-10)	69
9	Northwestern (IA) (26-6)	74
8	Northwest (WA) (28-4)	83
--	Cornerstone (MI) (19-13)	71
8	Northwest (WA) (27-4)	79
5	McPherson (KS) (30-3)	69*
--	Dakota State (SD) (18-13)	63
5	McPherson (KS) (31-3)	86
12	St. Thomas (FL) (23-8)	74
--	Indiana Tech (23-8)	55
12	St. Thomas (FL) (22-8)	58
4th SEED TIER; March 7
13	Indiana Wesleyan (21-12)	76
--	Warner Pacific (OR) (23-8)	79*
--	Warner Pacific (OR) (24-8)	70
4	Dordt (IA) (29-4)	77
--	Cal Maritime (21-10)	54
4	Dordt (IA) (28-4)	63
3	Davenport (MI) (29-4)	85*
--	William Penn (IA) (17-14)	81
3	Davenport (MI) (30-4)	80
14	Indiana Southeast (26-7)	52
--	Saint Mary (KS) (25-5)	67
14	Indiana Southeast (25-7)	77
3rd SEED TIER; March 8
11	Grace (IN) (24-7)	56
--	Briar Cliff (IA) (21-10)	59
--	Briar Cliff (IA) (22-10)	50
6	Cardinal Stritch (WI) (29-5)	55
--	Eastern Oregon (19-10)	60
6	Cardinal Stritch (WI) (28-5)	63
7	Bellevue (NE) (27-5)	58
--	Daemen (NY) (20-11)	48
7	Bellevue (NE) (28-5)	58
--	Saint Francis (IN) (22-12)	61
--	Saint Francis (IN) (21-12)	64
10	Jamestown (ND) (25-7)	63
2nd SEED TIER; March 8
15	Warner (FL) (23-10)	84
--	Indiana East (24-8)	68
15	Warner (FL) (24-10)	50
2	Oregon Tech (30-4)	69
--	Lourdes (OH) (17-16)	49
2	Oregon Tech (29-4)	58

Quarterfinals; March 10
1	Northwood (FL) (32-3)	77
8	Northwest (WA) (29-4)	50
5	McPherson (KS) (32-3)	82
4	Dordt (IA) (30-4)	78
3	Davenport (MI) (31-4)	68
6	Cardinal Stritch (WI) (30-5)	54
--	Saint Francis (IN) (23-12)	67
2	Oregon Tech (31-4)	100

Semifinals; March 12
1	Northwood (FL) (33-3)	75
5	McPherson (KS) (33-3)	56
3	Davenport (MI) (32-4)	50
2	Oregon Tech (32-4)	55

National championship March 13
1	Northwood (FL) (34-3)	46
2	Oregon Tech (33-4)	63

- * denotes overtime.

== See also ==
- 2012 NAIA Division I men's basketball tournament
- 2012 NCAA Division I men's basketball tournament
- 2012 NCAA Division II men's basketball tournament
- 2012 NCAA Division III men's basketball tournament
- 2012 NAIA Division II women's basketball tournament
