= 2012 NAIA Division I men's basketball tournament =

- Teams: 32
- Finals site: Municipal Auditorium; Kansas City, Missouri
- Champions: Concordia (Calif.)
- Runner-up: Oklahoma Baptist
- Semifinalists: Mountain State (W. Va.); Shorter (Ga.)

The 2012 Buffalo Funds - NAIA Division I men's basketball tournament was held in March at Municipal Auditorium in Kansas City, Missouri. The 75th annual NAIA basketball tournament features 32 teams playing in a single-elimination format. The opening game started on March 14, and the National Championship Game was played on March 20.

== Awards and honors ==
- Leading scorer:
- Leading rebounder:
- Player of the Year:
- Most consecutive tournament appearances: 21st, Georgetown (KY)
- Most tournament appearances: 31st, Georgetown (KY)

== 2012 NAIA bracket ==
First round March 14–15	Second round March 16
1	Shorter (Ga.)	105
-	Life (Ga.)	93
1	Shorter (Ga.)	92
16	Point Loma Nazarene (Calif.)	77
-	Texas Wesleyan	44
16	Point Loma Nazarene (Calif.)	74
March 14
9	Rogers State (Okla.)	62
-	Tougaloo (Miss.)	57
9	Rogers State (Okla.)	69
-	Evangel (Mo.)	63
-	Evangel (Mo.)	60
8	Lindsey Wilson (Ky.)	49
5	Southern Poly. (Ga.)	66
-	Cumberlands (Ky.)	60
5	Southern Poly (Ga.)	71
12	LSU Shreveport (La.)	84
-	Xavier (La.)	63
12	LSU Shreveport (La.)	66
March 15
13	John Brown (Ark.)	83
-	Montana Western	85*
-	Montana Western	85
4	Concordia (Calif.)	100
-	Oklahoma Christian	74
4	Concordia (Calif.)	81
3	Robert Morris (Ill.)	92
-	Southern New Orleans (La.)	94*
-	Southern-New Orleans (La.)	52
14	Georgetown (Ky.)	78
-	Lee (Tenn.)	62
14	Georgetown (Ky.)	70
March 14
11	Mountain State (W. Va.)	98
-	MidAmerica Nazarene (Kan.)	79
11	Mountain State (W. Va.)	88
6	Martin Methodist (Tenn.)	74
-	Southern Nazarene (Okla.)	68
6	Martin Methodist (Tenn.)	81
7	Our Lady of the Lake (Texas)	103
-	Baker (Kan.)	88
7	Our Lady of the Lake (Texas)	90
10	Biola (Calif.)	94*
-	Campbellsville (Ky.)	57
10	Biola (Calif.)	69
March 15
15	Columbia (Mo.)	58
-	Montana State-Northern	52
15	Columbia (Mo.)	57
2	Oklahoma Baptist	69
-	Belhaven (Miss.)	62
2	Oklahoma Baptist	68

Quarterfinals; March 17
1	Shorter (Ga.)	63
9	Rogers State (Okla.)	60
12	LSU Shreveport (La.)	65
4	Concordia (Calif.)	84
14	Georgetown (Ky.)	76
11	Mountain State (W. Va.)	83
10	Biola (Calif.)	56
2'	Oklahoma Baptist	67

National Semifinals; March 19
1	Shorter (Ga.)	67
4	Concordia (Calif.)	81
11	Mountain State (W. Va.)	56
2	Oklahoma Baptist	77

National Championship; March 20
4	Concordia (Calif.)	72
2	Oklahoma Baptist	69

== See also ==
- 2012 NAIA Division I women's basketball tournament
- 2012 NCAA Division I men's basketball tournament
- 2012 NCAA Division II men's basketball tournament
- 2012 NCAA Division III men's basketball tournament
- 2012 NAIA Division II men's basketball tournament
