= Frankfort Convention Center =

Multi-purpose arena in Frankfort, Kentucky

Coordinates: 38.20167°N 84.87642°W

The Frankfort Convention Center was a 5,000-seat multi-purpose arena in Frankfort, Kentucky, USA. It hosted locals sporting events and concerts. It was opened as part of the Capital Plaza urban renewal project in the 1970s. The arena's original name was the Farnham Dudgeon Civic Center. In January 2018, demolition on the facility started. Demolition was completed in Spring 2018. In 2024, the Kentucky General Assembly appropriated $11.25 million for a new convention center, and in 2026, the Frankfort City Commission approved a resolution to move forward with construction of a new meeting and event center.

On Wednesday, January 20, 1999, the arena hosted an untelevised live event from World Championship Wrestling.
