= 2012 NCAA Division II women's basketball tournament =

- Teams: 64
- Finals site: Bill Greehey Arena, San Antonio, Texas
- Champions: Shaw (1st title)
- Runner-up: Ashland (1st title game)
- Semifinalists: Bentley (8th Final Four); Rollins (1st Final Four)
- Winning coach: Jacques Curtis (1st title)
- MOP: Kyria Buford (Shaw)

The 2012 NCAA Division II women's basketball tournament was the 31st annual tournament hosted by the NCAA to determine the national champion of Division II women's collegiate basketball in the United States.

Shaw defeated Ashland in the championship game, 88–82 after one overtime period, to claim the Bears' first NCAA Division II national title.

The championship rounds were contested at Bill Greehey Arena on the campus of the St. Mary's University in San Antonio, Texas.

== Regionals ==
=== East - Waltham, Massachusetts ===
Location: Dana Center Host: Bentley College

First round Round of 64; March 9
6	Holy Family	71
3	Dowling	64
2	Southern Connecticut	58
7	C.W. Post	57
1	Bentley	77
8	District of Columbia	58
5	Franklin Pierce	78
4	Pace	68

Regional semifinals Round of 32; March 10
6	Holy Family	71
2	Southern Connecticut	61
1	Bentley	54
5	Franklin Pierce	52

Regional finals Sweet 16; March 12
6	Holy Family	73
1	Bentley	84

=== Central - Wayne, Nebraska ===
Location: Rice Auditorium Host: Wayne State College

First round Round of 64; March 9
3	Fort Lewis	69
6	Mary	58
2	Metro State	58
7	Minnesota-Duluth	47
1	Wayne State (NE)	78
8	Minnesota State-Mankato	74
4	Augustana (SD)	82
5	Colorado State-Pueblo	76

Regional semifinals Round of 32; March 10
3	Fort Lewis	42
2	Metro State	60
1	Wayne State (NE)	63
4	Augustana (SD)	40

Regional finals Sweet 16; March 12
2	Metro State	36
1	Wayne State (NE)	50

=== Midwest - Ashland, Ohio ===
Location: Kates Gymnasium Host: Ashland University

First round Round of 64; March 9
3	Wisconsin-Parkside	73
6	Indianapolis	66
2	Ferris State	74
7	Drury	56
1	Ashland	87
8	Maryville (MO)	62
5	Quincy	75
4	Northern Kentucky	65

Regional semifinals Round of 32; March 10
3	Wisconsin-Parkside	71
2	Ferris State	57
1	Ashland	71
5	Quincy	69

Regional finals Sweet 16; March 12
3	Wisconsin-Parkside	65
1	Ashland	78

=== West - La Jolla, California ===
Location: RIMAC Arena Host: University of California, San Diego

First round Round of 64; March 9
3	Grand Canyon	49
6	Cal Poly Pomona	48
2	Alaska Anchorage	65
7	Cal State L.A.	56
4	Western Washington	65
5	Cal State Monterey Bay	58
1	UC-San Diego	84
8	Cal State Chico	66

Regional semifinals Round of 32; March 10
3	Grand Canyon	58
2	Alaska Anchorage	77
4	Western Washington	66
1	UC-San Diego	81

Regional finals Sweet 16; March 12
2	Alaska Anchorage	68
1	UC-San Diego	63

=== South - Winter Park, Florida ===
Location: Alfond Sports Center Host: Rollins College

First round Round of 64; March 9
6	Valdosta State	59
3	Fort Valley State	47
2	Florida Southern	68
7	Florida Tech	52
1	Rollins	71
8	West Alabama	44
5	Delta State	86
4	Alabama-Huntsville	47

Regional semifinals Round of 32; March 10
6	Valdosta State	67
2	Florida Southern	63
1	Rollins	69
5	Delta State	59

Regional finals Sweet 16; March 12
6	Valdosta State	54
1	Rollins	56

=== Southeast - Aiken, South Carolina ===
Location: USCA Convocation Center Host: University of South Carolina-Aiken

First round Round of 64; March 9
3	Wingate	64
6	Barton	59
2	Clayton State	51
7	Tusculum	26
1	South Carolina-Aiken	71
8	Catawba	69
4	Lander	77
5	Limestone	68

Regional semifinals Round of 32; March 10
3	Wingate	64
2	Clayton State	63
1	South Carolina-Aiken	55
4	Lander	61

Regional finals Sweet 16; March 12
3	Wingate	67
4	Lander	72

=== Atlantic - Edinboro, Pennsylvania ===
Location: McComb Fieldhouse Host: Edinboro University of Pennsylvania

First round Round of 64; March 9
6	Gannon	61
3	Johnson C. Smith	50
2	Shaw	92
7	West Virginia Wesleyan	78
1	Edinboro	69
8	West Chester	65
5	Indiana (PA)	77
4	Bloomsburg	76

Regional semifinals Round of 32; March 10
6	Gannon	59
2	Shaw	64
1	Edinboro	70
5	Indiana (PA)	56

Regional finals Sweet 16; March 12
2	Shaw	70
1	Edinboro	53

=== South Central - Topeka, Kansas ===
Location: Lee Arena Host: Washburn University

First round Round of 64; March 9
3	Pittsburg State	74
6	Central Missouri	70
2	Northeastern State	53
7	Newman	45
1	Washburn	68
8	West Texas A&M	36
5	Emporia State	64
4	Tarleton State	56

Regional semifinals Round of 32; March 10
3	Pittsburg State	68
2	Northeastern State	54
1	Washburn	65
5	Emporia State	71

Regional finals Sweet 16; March 12
3	Pittsburg State	79
5	Emporia State	67

== Elite Eight - San Antonio, Texas ==
Location: Bill Greehey Arena Host: Saint Mary's University

National quarterfinals Elite Eight; March 20
Bentley	72
Wayne State (NE)	67
Ashland	71
Alaska Anchorage	51
Rollins	66
Lander	62
Shaw	61
Pittsburg State	58

National semifinals Final Four; March 21
Bentley	62
Ashland	77
Rollins	71
Shaw	87

National championship March 23
Ashland	82
Shaw	88*

== All-tournament team ==
- Kyria Buford, Shaw
- Sequoyah Griffin, Shaw
- Jena Stutzman, Ashland
- Kari Daugherty, Ashland
- Jacqui Brugliera, Bentley

== See also ==
- NCAA Women's Division II Basketball Championship
- 2012 NCAA Division II men's basketball tournament
