= Williams Center (sports facility) =

University sports facility in Whitewater, Wisconsin

Coordinates: 42°50′36″N 88°44′44″W

The Williams Center is a facility for intramural and recreational sports at the University of Wisconsin–Whitewater.

== Uses ==
The college used the center to welcome the UW-W football team when it won the 2010 Division III national championship.

The center hosted the 2010 Division III Volleyball championship for universities in the University of Wisconsin System.

== Facilities ==
The Williams center has the following facilities:

- 200 Meter Indoor Track with multi-purpose courts for basketball
- Golf Hitting Cage and Putting Green
- 4 Racquetball Courts
- Basketball Gymnasium (Main Gym)
- Wrestling Gymnasium
- Gymnastics Gymnasium
- Volleyball Arena
- Dance Studio
- Swimming Pool and Diving Well

== Sports teams ==
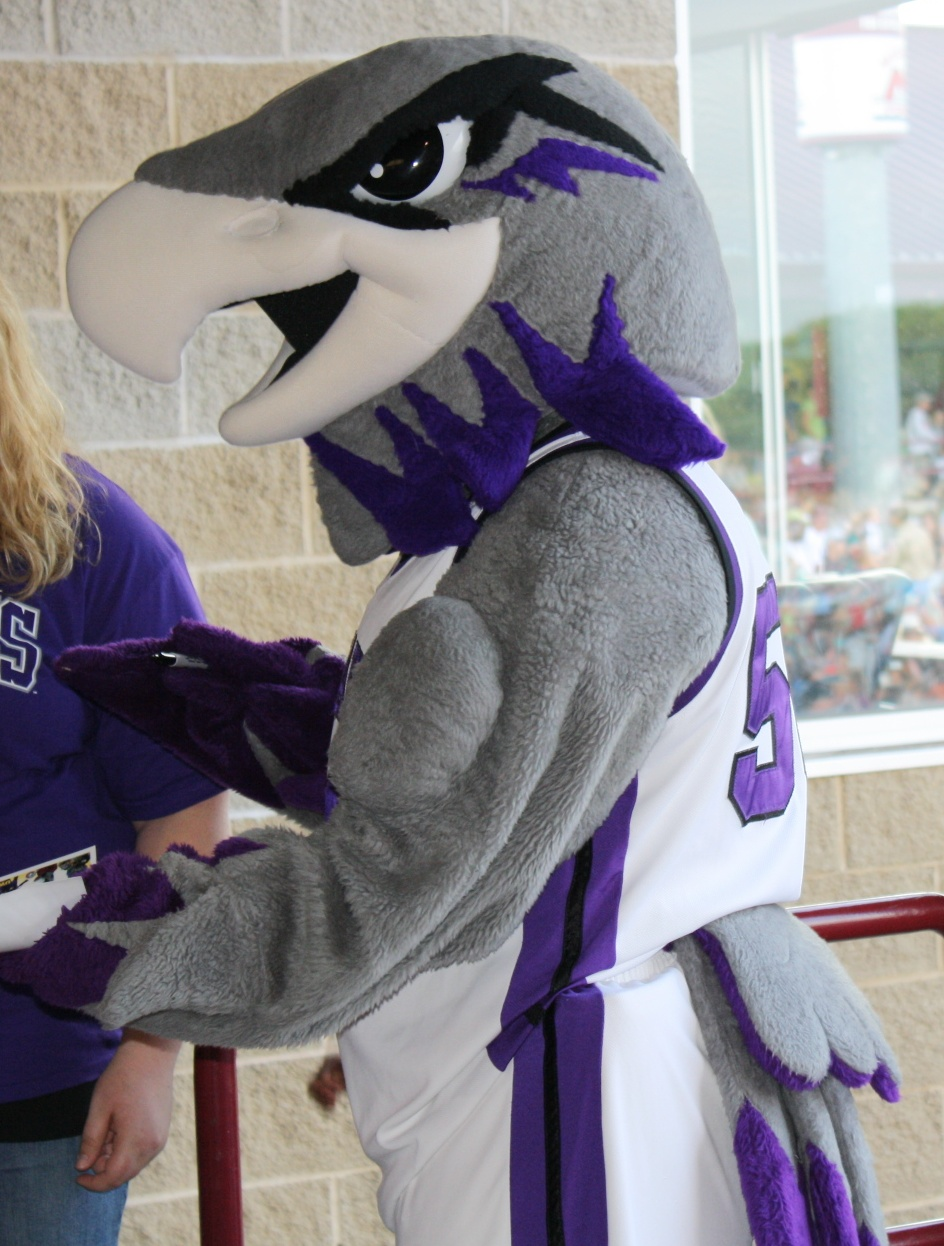
Mascot

UW–Whitewater is a member of NCAA Division III for athletics. It is a member of the Wisconsin Intercollegiate Athletic Conference (WIAC). The athletics teams are nicknamed the Warhawks and wear purple and white.

== Mission statement ==
The mission of the Office of Recreation Sports and Facilities is to provide facilities, programs, and services that address all physical, recreational, and leisure pursuits of the university community. Emphasis is placed on participation, increasing knowledge of wellness and physical fitness, and promoting healthy lifestyle behaviors.
