= 2012 NCAA Division III men's basketball tournament =

American collegiate men's basketball tournament (2012)

- Teams: 62
- Finals site: , Salem, Virginia
- Champions: Whitewater State Warhawks (3rd title)
- Runner-up: Cabrini Cavaliers (1st title game)
- Semifinalists: MIT Engineers (1st Final Four); Illinois Wesleyan Titans (5th Final Four)
- Winning coach: Pat Miller (1st title)
- MOP: Chris Davis (UW-Whitewater)

The 2012 NCAA Division III men's basketball tournament was a single-elimination tournament to determine the men's collegiate basketball national champion of National Collegiate Athletic Association (NCAA) Division III. It involved 62 teams, beginning on March 1, 2012 and concluded with the championship game on March 17, 2012, at the Salem Civic Center in Salem, Virginia.

The UW-Whitewater Warhawks won their third Division III title, defeating the Cabrini Cavaliers in the championship game by a score of 63-60.

== Tournament schedule and venues ==
2012 Sectionals(blue) and Final Four (red)

The following are the sites selected to host each round of the 2012 tournament:

First and second rounds

- Coles Center, New York, NY (Host: New York University)
- O'Brien Center, St. Mary's City, MD (Host: St. Mary's College of Maryland)
- Washington University Field House, St. Louis, MO (Host: Washington University in St. Louis)
- Beck Center, Lexington, Kentucky (Host: Transylvania University)
- DeVos Fieldhouse, Holland, MI (Host: Hope College)
- Timken Gymnasium, Wooster, OH (Host: The College of Wooster)
- Dixon Center, Radnor, PA (Host: Cabrini College)
- Max Ziel Gymnasium, Oswego, NY (Host: State University of New York at Oswego)
- Recreation Center, Wayne, NJ (Host: William Paterson University)
- Pepin Gymnasium, Middlebury, VT (Host: Middlebury College)
- Binder Physical Education Center, Oneonta, NY (Host: Hartwick College)
- Sports and Recreation Center, Staten Island, NY (Host: College of Staten Island)
- Mayser Center, Lancaster, PA (Host: Franklin & Marshall College)
- Karges Center, River Falls, WI (Host: UW-River Falls)
- Williams Center, Whitewater, WI (Host: UW-Whitewater)
- Mayborn Campus Center, Belton, TX (Host: University of Mary Hardin-Baylor)
- LeFrak Gymnasium, Amherst, MA (Host: Amherst College)
- Batten Student Center, Virginia Beach, VA (Host: Virginia Wesleyan College)

Sectional sites

- Pepin Gymnasium, Middlebury, VT (Host: Middlebury College)
- Timken Gymnasium, Wooster, OH (Host: The College of Wooster)
- Mayser Center, Lancaster, PA (Host: Franklin & Marshall College)
- LeFrak Gymnasium, Amherst, MA (Host: Amherst College)

Final Four - Salem

- Salem Civic Center (Host: Old Dominion Athletic Conference)

== Qualified teams ==
=== Automatic qualifiers ===
The following teams were automatic qualifiers for the 2013 NCAA field by virtue of winning their conference's tournament (except for the UAA, whose regular-season champion received the automatic bid).

Conference	School	Appearance	Last Bid
Allegheny Mountain	Medaille	3rd	2010
American Southwest	McMurry	4th	2011
Capital	York (Pa.)	3rd	2006
Centennial	Franklin and Marshall	23rd	2011
CUNYAC	Staten Island	10th	2002
CCIW	North Central (Ill.)	6th	2006
Colonial States	Cabrini	10th	2011
Commonwealth Coast	Endicott	5th	2006
Empire 8	Ithaca	9th	2011
Great Northeast	Albertus Magnus	2nd	2010
Heartland	Rose-Hulman	9th	1999
Iowa	Buena Vista	9th	2008
Landmark	Scranton	24th	2011
Liberty	Skidmore	2nd	2011
Little East	Eastern Connecticut	4th	2000
MASCAC	Salem State	23rd	2009
Michigan	Hope	23rd	2011
MAC-Commonwealth	Messiah	3rd	2007
MAC-Freedom	Misericordia	1st	Never
Midwest	Carroll	2nd	2006
Minnesota	St. Thomas	13th	2011
New England	Becker	2nd	2011
NESCAC	Amherst	14th	2011
NEWMAC	MIT	4th	2011
New Jersey	William Paterson	15th	2010
North Atlantic	Castleton State	2nd	2004
North Coast	Wooster	21st	2011
North Eastern	Morrisville State	1st	Never
Northern	Edgewood	3rd	2005
Northwest	Whitworth	7th	2011
Ohio	Capital	9th	2009
Old Dominion	Virginia Wesleyan	12th	2011
Presidents'	Bethany	8th	2011
Skyline	Farmingdale State	4th	2009
SCIAC	Claremont-Mudd-Scripps	11th	2010
SCAC	Trinity (Texas)	6th	2008
SLIAC	Westminster (Mo.)	3rd	2010
SUNYAC	Oswego State	2nd	2011
UAA	Washington U.	16th	2010
Upper Midwest	Northwestern (Minn.)	2nd	2011
USA South	Christopher Newport	18th	2010
Wisconsin	UW-River Falls	2nd	2011

=== At-large qualifiers ===
The NCAA Selection Committee, by rule, must select one team from the conferences without automatic berths and non-affiliated schools (Pool B). The Selection Committee makes the remaining 19 selections at-large from all conferences (Pool C).

Conference	School	Appearance	Last Bid	Pool
Great South	Maryville (Tenn.)	15th	2010	Pool B
SCAC	Birmingham–Southern	1st	Never	Pool C
Minnesota	Gustavus Adolphus	13th	2005	Pool C
Empire 8	Hartwick	6th	2011	Pool C
Liberty	Hobart	2nd	2001	Pool C
CCIW	Illinois Wesleyan	21st	2011	Pool C
American Southwest	Mary Hardin-Baylor	5th	2011	Pool C
NESCAC	Middlebury	5th	2011	Pool C
UAA	NYU	26th	2006	Pool C
North Coast	Ohio Wesleyan	3rd	2008	Pool C
Old Dominion	Randolph-Macon	12th	2011	Pool C
Little East	Rhode Island College	9th	2011	Pool C
Skyline	St. Joseph's-Long Island	2nd	2009	Pool C
Capital	St. Mary's (Md.)	4th	2011	Pool C
Heartland	Transylvania	8th	2009	Pool C
Wisconsin	UW-Stevens Point	11th	2011	Pool C
Wisconsin	UW-Whitewater	17th	2011	Pool C
Little East	Western Connecticut	12th	2011	Pool C
CCIW	Wheaton (Ill.)	8th	2010	Pool C
North Coast	Wittenberg	26th	2011	Pool C

== Bracket ==
* – Denotes overtime period

Unless otherwise noted, all times listed are Eastern Daylight Time (UTC-04)

=== Middlebury, VT Sectional ===
First round March 2
Cabrini	104
Castleton State	87
Radnor, PA
Hobart	64
Ohio Wesleyan	60
Oswego State	72*
Endicott	71
Oswego, NY
E. Connecticut	69
Medaille	51
Middlebury	75
Morrisville State	49
Middlebury, VT
Albertus Magnus	87
St. Joseph's-L.I.	84
William Paterson	53
Becker	69
Wayne, NJ
Messiah	67
Scranton	70*

Second round March 3
Cabrini	90*
Hobart	88
Oswego State	69
E. Connecticut	70**
Middlebury	89
Albertus Magnus	73
Becker	41
Scranton	69

Sectional Semifinals; March 9
Cabrini	72
E. Connecticut	65
Middlebury	55
Scranton	58

Sectional Finals; March 10
Cabrini	78
Scranton	58

=== Wooster, OH Sectional ===
First round March 2
Washington U.	71
Buena Vista	59
St. Louis, MO
North Central (Ill.)	74
Rose-Hulman	71
Transylvania	74
Carroll	84
Lexington, KY
Wittenberg	63
Birmingham-Southern	56
Wooster	70
Maryville (Tenn.)	63
Wooster, OH
Randolph-Macon	60
Capital	68
Hope	79
Westminster (Mo.)	65
Holland, MI
UW-Stevens Point	61
Illinois Wesleyan	69

Second round March 3
Washington U.	68
North Central (Ill.)	72
Carroll	70
Wittenberg	87
Wooster	92
Capital	79
Hope	101
Illinois Wesleyan	108**

Sectional Semifinals; March 9
North Central	55
Wittenberg	58
Wooster	67
Illinois Wesleyan	69

Sectional Finals; March 10
Wittenberg	49
Illinois Wesleyan	70

=== Lancaster, PA Sectional ===
First round March 1/March 2
New York, NY / Amherst, MA
NYU	84
Misericordia	65
Franklin & Marshall	72
York (Pa.)	50
Lancaster, PA
W. Connecticut	94
Christopher Newport	84
Hartwick	88
Farmingdale State	98*
Oneonta, NY
MIT	62
Skidmore	55
Staten Island	98
Ithaca	73
Staten Island, NY
Rhode Island C.	77
Salem State	60

Second round March 3
Amherst	80
NYU	56
Franklin & Marshall	82
W. Connecticut	72
Farmingdale State	63
MIT	83
Staten Island	77
Rhode Island C.	67

Sectional Semifinals; March 9
Amherst	71
Franklin & Marshall	80
MIT	83
Staten Island	67

Sectional Finals; March 10
Franklin & Marshall	54
MIT	69

=== Whitewater, WI Sectional ===
First round March 1/March 2
St. Mary's City, MD / Virginia Beach, VA
St. Mary's (Md.)	69
Bethany	57
Mary Hardin-Baylor	66
Trinity (Texas)	68
Belton, TX
Whitworth	90
McMurry	79
UW-River Falls	67
Edgewood	75
River Falls, WI
Wheaton (Ill.)	68
Gustavus Adolphus	60
UW-Whitewater	83
Northwestern (Minn.)	68
Whitewater, WI
Claremont-Mudd-Scripps	74
St. Thomas	76*

Second round March 3
Virginia Wesleyan	70
St. Mary's (Md.)	57
Trinity (Texas)	53
Whitworth	64
Edgewood	62
Wheaton (Ill.)	73
UW-Whitewater	91
St. Thomas	62

Sectional Semifinals; March 9
Virginia Wesleyan	74*
Whitworth	71
Wheaton (Ill.)	56
UW-Whitewater	67

Sectional Finals; March 10
Virginia Wesleyan	62
UW-Whitewater	76

=== Final Four - Salem, Virginia ===
Semifinals; March 16
Cabrini	81
Illinois Wesleyan	78
MIT	56
UW-Whitewater	71

national championship March 17
Cabrini	60
UW-Whitewater	63

== Record by conference ==
Conference	# of Bids	Record	Win %	R62	R32	S16	E8	F4	CG	NC
Wisconsin	3	6-2	.750	3	1	1	1	1	1	1
CSAC	1	5–1	.833	1	1	1	1	1	1	–
CCIW	3	8–3	.727	3	3	3	1	1	–	–
NEWMAC	1	4–1	.800	1	1	1	1	1	–	–
North Coast	3	5–3	.625	3	2	2	1	–	–	–
Centennial	1	3–1	.750	1	1	1	1	–	–	–
Landmark	1	3–1	.750	1	1	1	1	–	–	–
ODAC	2	2–2	.500	1	1	1	1	–	–	–
NESCAC	2	3–2	.600	2	2	2	–	–	–	–
Little East	3	4–3	.571	3	3	1	–	–	–	–
CUNYAC	1	2–1	.667	1	1	1	–	–	–	–
Northwest	1	2–1	.667	1	1	1	–	–	–	–
UAA	2	2–2	.500	2	2	–	–	–	–	–
Capital	2	1–2	.333	2	1	–	–	–	–	–
Liberty League	2	1–2	.333	2	1	–	–	–	–	–
Michigan	2	1–2	.333	2	1	–	–	–	–	–
SCAC	2	1–2	.333	2	1	–	–	–	–	–
Skyline	2	1–2	.333	2	1	–	–	–	–	–
Great Northeast	1	1–1	.500	1	1	–	–	–	–	–
Michigan	1	1–1	.500	1	1	–	–	–	–	–
Midwest	1	1–1	.500	1	1	–	–	–	–	–
New England	1	1–1	.500	1	1	–	–	–	–	–
Northern	1	1–1	.500	1	1	–	–	–	–	–
Ohio	1	1–1	.500	1	1	–	–	–	–	–
SUNYAC	1	1–1	.500	1	1	–	–	–	–	–

- The R62, R32, S16, E8, F4, CG, NC columns indicate how many teams from each conference were in the round of 62 (first round), round of 32 (second round), Sweet 16, Elite Eight, Final Four, championship game, and national champion, respectively.
- The NESCAC and ODAC each had one representative which earned a bye to the second round.
- The AMCC, CCC, IIAC, MASCAC, MAC Commonwealth, MAC Freedom, NJAC, North Atlantic, NEAC, Presidents' Athletic Conference, SCIAC, SLIAC, UMAC, and USA South each had one representative, eliminated in the second round with a record of 0–1.
- The American Southwest, Empire 8, Heartland had two representatives, eliminated in the first round, with a record of 0–2.

== See also ==
- 2012 NCAA Division I men's basketball tournament
- 2012 NCAA Division II men's basketball tournament
