= 2012 NCAA Division II men's basketball tournament =

- Teams: 64
- Finals site: The Bank of Kentucky Center, Highland Heights, Kentucky
- Champions: Western Washington Vikings (1st title)
- Runner-up: Montevallo Falcons (1st title game)
- Semifinalists: Stonehill SkyHawks (2nd Final Four); Bellarmine Knights (2nd Final Four)
- Winning coach: Brad Jackson (1st title)
- MOP: D. J. Rivera (Montevallo)

The 2012 NCAA Division II men's basketball tournament involved 64 schools playing in a single-elimination tournament to determine the national champion of men's NCAA Division II college basketball as a culmination of the 2011–12 basketball season.

The Western Washington Vikings won the tournament to earn the first basketball national championship in school history.

2012 NCAA Division II Men's sites - regionals (cyan) Elite Eight (red)

== Qualification and tournament format ==
The champions of 22 of the 23 Division II basketball conferences qualified automatically. An additional 42 teams were selected as at-large participants by the selection committee. The first three rounds of the tournament were organized in regions comprising eight participants in groups of two or three conferences (two in the Central and Midwest regions). The eight regional winners met at the Elite Eight for the final three rounds held at The Bank of Kentucky Center, now known as BB&T Arena, on the campus of Northern Kentucky University in Highland Heights, Kentucky, after the final rounds were held in Springfield, Massachusetts for the previous six years.

=== Automatic qualifiers ===
The following teams automatically qualified for the tournament as the winners of their conference tournament championships: The newly formed Great American Conference began play for the 2011–12 season, composed of former members of the Lone Star Conference and Gulf South Conference. The conference champion, Arkansas Tech, was not eligible for an automatic berth, but did receive an at-large No. 3 seed in the South Central Region.

Team	Conference	Region
Humboldt State	CCAA	West
Bloomfield	CACC	East
Winston-Salem State	CIAA	Atlantic
Barton	Conference Carolinas	Southeast
C.W. Post	ECC	East
Findlay	GLIAC	Midwest
Southern Indiana	GLVC	Midwest
Montana State Billings	GNAC	West
Alabama-Hunstville	Gulf South	South
St. Mary's (Texas)	Heartland	South Central
Midwestern State	Lone Star	South Central
Washburn	MIAA	South Central
Stonehill	Northeast-10	East
Southwest Minnesota State	NSIC	Central
Dixie State	Pacific West	West
Montevallo	Peach Belt	Southeast
East Stroudsburg	PSAC	Atlantic
Colorado Mines	RMAC	Central
Wingate	SAC	Southeast
Benedict	SIAC	South
Florida Southern	Sunshine State	South
West Liberty	WVIAC	Atlantic

=== Qualified teams ===
East Region
Seed	School	Conference	Record	Qualification
#1	Franklin Pierce	NE-10	21–7	At-large
#2	Stonehill	NE-10	21–8	Automatic
#3	Adelphi	NE-10	20–8	At-large
#4	UMass Lowell	NE-10	19–10	At-large
#5	Bloomfield	CACC	24–7	Automatic
#6	C.W. Post	ECC	23–5	Automatic
#7	District of Columbia	ECC	22–5	At-large
#8	Philadelphia	CACC	19–9	At-large
Atlantic Region
Seed	School	Conference	Record	Qualification
#1	West Liberty	WVIAC	29–2	Automatic
#2	Shaw	CIAA	25–3	At-large
#3	Charleston (WV)	WVIAC	26–6	At-large
#4	West Virginia Wesleyan	WVIAC	21–8	At-large
#5	Winston-Salem State	CIAA	21–8	Automatic
#6	Wheeling Jesuit	WVIAC	21–9	At-large
#7	Indiana (PA)	PSAC	23–5	At-large
#8	East Stroudsburg	PSAC	20–11	Automatic
South Central Region
Seed	School	Conference	Record	Qualification
#1	Midwestern State	Lone Star	26–3	Automatic
#2	Tarleton State	Lone Star	26–5	At-large
#3	Arkansas Tech	GAC	21–4	At-large
#4	Washburn	MIAA	24–7	Automatic
#5	Northwest Missouri State	MIAA	22–6	At-large
#6	West Texas A&M	Lone Star	19–8	At-large
#7	Missouri Southern State	MIAA	22–7	At-large
#8	St. Mary's (TX)	Heartland	19–8	Automatic
West Region
Seed	School	Conference	Record	Qualification
#1	Western Washington	GNAC	25–5	At-large
#2	Alaska–Anchorage	GNAC	22–6	At-large
#3	Seattle Pacific	GNAC	21–7	At-large
#4	Humboldt State	CCAA	22–7	Automatic
#5	Chico State	CCAA	24–7	At-large
#6	Dixie State	Pacific West	20–6	Automatic
#7	Montana State–Billings	GNAC	18–11	Automatic
#8	Grand Canyon	Pacific West	19–7	At-large

South Region
Seed	School	Conference	Record	Qualification
#1	Alabama–Huntsville	Gulf South	26–3	Automatic
#2	Christian Brothers	Gulf South	23–6	At-large
#3	West Georgia	Gulf South	22–8	At-large
#4	Florida Tech	Sunshine State	22–6	At-large
#5	Saint Leo	Sunshine State	18–11	At-large
#6	Eckerd	Sunshine State	20–8	At-large
#7	Florida Southern	Sunshine State	20–9	Automatic
#8	Benedict	SIAC	19–10	Automatic
Midwest Region
Seed	School	Conference	Record	Qualification
#1	Bellarmine	GLVC	25–3	At-large
#2	Southern Indiana	GLVC	24–6	Automatic
#3	Hillsdale	GLIAC	24–5	At-large
#4	Northern Kentucky	GLVC	23–6	At-large
#5	Findlay	GLIAC	23–6	Automatic
#6	Indianapolis	GLVC	19–8	At-large
#7	Kentucky Wesleyan	GLVC	21–7	At-large
#8	Lewis	GLVC	17–11	At-large
Central Region
Seed	School	Conference	Record	Qualification
#1	Colorado Mines	RMAC	27–2	Automatic
#2	Metropolitan State	RMAC	22–6	At-large
#3	Bemidji State	NSIC	22–8	At-large
#4	Southwest Minnesota State	NSIC	18–10	Automatic
#5	Minnesota State–Moorhead	NSIC	20–8	At-large
#6	St. Cloud State	NSIC	19–8	At-large
#7	Adams State	RMAC	19–8	At-large
#8	Augustana (SD)	NSIC	17–10	At-large
Southeast Region
Seed	School	Conference	Record	Qualification
#1	Montevallo	Peach Belt	24–7	Automatic
#2	USC Aiken	Peach Belt	21–7	At-large
#3	Anderson (SC)	SAC	24–5	At-large
#4	Lincoln Memorial	SAC	25–5	At-large
#5	King	Conference Carolinas	23–7	At-large
#6	Columbus State	Peach Belt	18–11	At-large
#7	Wingate	SAC	20–11	Automatic
#8	Barton	Conference Carolinas	20–9	Automatic

=== Teams per conference ===
- GLVC: 6
- NSIC: 5
- GNAC, NE-10, Sunshine State, WVIAC: 4
- Gulf South, Lone Star, MIAA, Peach Belt, RMAC, SAC: 3
- CCAA, CACC, CIAA, Conference Carolinas, ECC, GLIAC, Pacific West, PSAC: 2
- GAC, Heartland, SIAC: 1

== Regionals ==
=== East - Rindge, New Hampshire ===
Location: Franklin Pierce Fieldhouse Host: Franklin Pierce University

First round Round of 64; March 10
1	Franklin Pierce (21–7)	59
8	Philadelphia (19–9)	58
4	Mass.-Lowell (19–10)	83
5	Bloomfield (24–7)	91
3	Adelphi (20–8)	66
6	C.W. Post (23–5)	65
2	Stonehill (21–8)	65
7	Dist. Columbia (22–5)	61

Regional semifinal Round of 32; March 11
1	Franklin Pierce	60
5	Bloomfield	69
3	Adelphi	58
2	Stonehill	68

Regional final Sweet 16; March 13
5	Bloomfield	70
2	Stonehill	75

=== Atlantic - West Liberty, West Virginia ===
Location: Academic, Sports, and Recreation Complex Host: West Liberty University

First round Round of 64; March 10
1	West Liberty (29–2)	119
8	East Stroudsburg (20–11)	82
4	West Va. Wesleyan (21–8)	57
5	Winston-Salem (21–8)	54
3	Charleston, WV (26–6)	76
6	Wheeling Jesuit (21–9)	79
2	Shaw (25–3)	62
7	Indiana, PA (23–5)	54

Regional semifinal Round of 32; March 11
1	West Liberty	99
4	West Va. Wesleyan	69
6	Wheeling Jesuit	68
2	Shaw	92

Regional final Sweet 16; March 13
1	West Liberty	89
2	Shaw	78

=== South Central - Wichita Falls, Texas ===
Location: Gerald Stockton Court Host: Midwestern State University

First round Round of 64; March 10
1	Midwestern State (26–3)	62
8	St. Mary's, TX (19–8)	54
4	Washburn (24–7)	69
5	Northwest Mo. State (22–6)	60
3	Arkansas Tech (21–4)	79
6	West Texas A&M (19–8)	68
2	Tarleton State (26–5)	69
7	Mo. Southern State (22–7)	52

Regional semifinal Round of 32; March 11
1	Midwestern State	72
4	Washburn	63
3	Arkansas Tech	64
2	Tarleton State	63

Regional final Sweet 16; March 13
1	Midwestern State	77
3	Arkansas Tech	61

=== West - Bellingham, Washington ===
Location: Sam Carver Gymnasium Host: Western Washington University

First round Round of 64; March 9
1	Western Wash. (25–5)	79
8	Grand Canyon (19–7)	73
4	Humboldt St. (22–7)	68
5	Cal. St. Chico (24–7)	75
3	Seattle Pacific (21–7)	70
6	Dixie St. (20–6)	68
2	Alas. Anchorage (22–6)	80
7	Mont. St. Billings (18–11)	68

Regional semifinal Round of 32; March 10
1	Western Wash.	74
5	Cal. St. Chico	65
3	Seattle Pacific	80
2	Alas. Anchorage	67

Regional final Sweet 16; March 12
1	Western Wash.	56
3	Seattle Pacific	50

=== South - Huntsville, Alabama ===
Location: Spragins Hall Host: University of Alabama in Huntsville

First round Round of 64; March 10
1	Ala.-Huntsville (26–3)	69
8	Benedict (19–10)	61
4	Florida Tech (22–6)	61
5	Saint Leo (18–11)	56
3	West Ga. (22–8)	53
6	Eckerd (20–8)	60
2	Christian Bros. (23–6)	85
7	Fla. Southern (20–9)	74

Regional semifinal Round of 32; March 11
1	Ala.-Huntsville	82
4	Florida Tech	71
6	Eckerd	57
2	Christian Bros.	60

Regional final Sweet 16; March 13
1	Ala.-Huntsville	69
2	Christian Bros.	58

=== Midwest - Louisville, Kentucky ===
Location: Knights Hall Host: Bellarmine University

First round Round of 64; March 10
1	Bellarmine (25–3)	86
8	Lewis (17–11)	63
4	Northern Ky. (23–6)	49
5	Findlay (23–6)	50
3	Hillsdale (24–5)	62
6	Indianapolis (19–8)	66
2	Southern Ind. (24–6)	58
7	Ky. Wesleyan (21–7)	64

Regional semifinal Round of 32; March 11
1	Bellarmine	86
5	Findlay	63
6	Indianapolis	77
7	Ky. Wesleyan	91

Regional final Sweet 16; March 13
1	Bellarmine	79
7	Ky. Wesleyan	74

=== Central - Golden, Colorado ===
Location: Steinhauer Field House Host: Colorado School of Mines

First round Round of 64; March 10
1	Colorado Mines (27–2)	82
8	Augustana, SD (17–10)	69
4	SMSU (18–10)	66
5	Minn. St. Moorhead (20–8)	82
3	Bemidji St. (22–8)	72
6	St. Cloud St. (19–8)	77
2	Metro St. (22–6)	79
7	Adams St. (19–8)	74

Regional semifinal Round of 32; March 11
1	Colorado Mines	80
5	Minn. St. Moorhead	60
6	St. Cloud St.	64
2	Metro St.	76

Regional final Sweet 16; March 13
1	Colorado Mines	64
2	Metro St.	73

=== Southeast - Montevallo, Alabama ===
Location: People's Bank and Trust Arena Host: University of Montevallo

First round Round of 64; March 10
1	Montevallo (24–7)	96
8	Barton (20–9)	87
4	Lincoln Memorial (25–5)	67
5	King, TN (23–7)	60
3	Anderson, SC (24–5)	77
6	Columbus St. (18–11)	64
2	S.C. Aiken (21–7)	70
7	Wingate (20–11)	73

Regional semifinal Round of 32; March 11
1	Montevallo	61
4	Lincoln Memorial	60
3	Anderson, SC	71
7	Wingate	63

Regional final Sweet 16; March 13
1	Montevallo	86
3	Anderson, SC	73

== Elite Eight – Highland Heights, Kentucky ==
Location: The Bank of Kentucky Center Host: Northern Kentucky University

National Quarterfinals; Elite Eight; Wednesday, March 21
E2	Stonehill (24–8)	91
A1	West Liberty (32–2)	90
SC1	Midwestern State (29–3)	63
W1	Western Washington (28–5)	65
S1	Alabama-Huntsville (28–3)	73
M1	Bellarmine (29-3)	82
C2	Metro State (25–6)	65
SE1	Montevallo (27–7)	67

National semifinals Final Four; Thursday, March 22
E2	Stonehill	66
W1	Western Washington	71
M1	Bellarmine	72
SE1	Montevallo	79

National championship Saturday, March 24
W1	Western Washington	72
SE1	Montevallo	65

== All-tournament team ==
- Rory Blanche (Western Washington)
- Antoine Davis (Montevallo)
- Chris Dowe (Bellarmine)
- D.J. Rivera (Montevallo)
- Richard Woodworth (Western Washington)
