= 2003 in basketball =

The following are the basketball events of the year 2003 throughout the world.

== Champions ==
=== Professional ===
- Men
  - 2003 NBA Finals: San Antonio Spurs over the New Jersey Nets 4-2. MVP: Tim Duncan (More information can be found at 2003-04 NBA season.)
    - 2002-03 NBA season
    - 2003 NBA Playoffs
    - 2003 NBA draft
    - 2003 NBA All-Star Game
  - Eurobasket: Lithuania 93, Spain 84
- Women
  - WNBA Finals: Detroit Shock over Los Angeles Sparks 2-1. MVP: Ruth Riley
    - 2003 WNBA season
    - 2003 WNBA Playoffs
    - 2003 WNBA draft
    - 2003 WNBA All-Star Game
  - Eurobasket Women: Russia def. Czech Republic

=== College ===
- Men
  - NCAA Division I: Syracuse University 81, University of Kansas 78
  - National Invitation Tournament: University of Michigan
  - NCAA Division II: Northeastern State University 75, Kentucky Wesleyan College 64
  - NCAA Division III: Williams College 67, Gustavus Adolphus College 65
  - NAIA Division I Concordia 88, Mountain State 84 OT
  - NAIA Division II Oregon Tech 81, Bellevue (Neb.) 70
- Women
  - NCAA Division I: University of Connecticut 73, University of Tennessee 68
  - Women's National Invitation Tournament: Auburn 64, Baylor 63
  - NCAA Division II: South Dakota State 65, Northern Kentucky University 60
  - NCAA Division III Trinity University (Tex.) 60, Eastern Connecticut State 58
  - NAIA Division I: Southern Nazarene (Okla.) 71, Oklahoma City University 70
  - NAIA Division II Hastings (Neb.) 59, Dakota Wesleyan (S.D.) 53

== Awards and honors ==
=== Naismith Memorial Basketball Hall of Fame ===
- Class of 2003:
  - Leon Barmore
  - Francis D. "Chick" Hearn
  - Earl F. Lloyd
  - Meadowlark Lemon
  - Dino Meneghin
  - Robert L. Parish
  - James A. Worthy

=== Women's Basketball Hall of Fame ===
- Class of 2003

- Leon Barmore
- Tara Heiss
- Claude Hutcherson
- Patsy Neal
- Doris Rogers
- Marsha Sharp

=== Professional ===
- Men
  - NBA Most Valuable Player Award: Tim Duncan
  - NBA Rookie of the Year Award: Amar'e Stoudemire
  - NBA Defensive Player of the Year Award: Ben Wallace
  - NBA Coach of the Year Award: Gregg Popovich, San Antonio Spurs
  - Euroscar Award: Dirk Nowitzki, Dallas Mavericks and Germany
  - Mr. Europa: Šarūnas Jasikevičius, Maccabi Tel Aviv and Lithuania (also FC Barcelona)
- Women
  - WNBA Most Valuable Player Award: Lauren Jackson, Seattle Storm
  - WNBA Defensive Player of the Year Award: Sheryl Swoopes, Houston Comets
  - WNBA Rookie of the Year Award: Cheryl Ford, Detroit Shock
  - WNBA Most Improved Player Award: Michelle Snow, Houston Comets
  - Kim Perrot Sportsmanship Award: Edna Campbell, Sacramento Monarchs
  - WNBA Coach of the Year Award: Bill Laimbeer, Detroit Shock
  - WNBA Finals Most Valuable Player Award: Ruth Riley, Detroit Shock

=== Collegiate ===
- Combined
  - Legends of Coaching Award: Roy Williams, Kansas
- Men
  - John R. Wooden Award: T. J. Ford, Texas
  - Naismith College Coach of the Year: Tubby Smith, Kentucky
  - Frances Pomeroy Naismith Award: Jason Gardner, Arizona
  - Associated Press College Basketball Player of the Year: David West, Xavier
  - NCAA basketball tournament Most Outstanding Player: Emeka Okafor, Connecticut
  - USBWA National Freshman of the Year: Carmelo Anthony, Syracuse
  - Associated Press College Basketball Coach of the Year: Tubby Smith, Kentucky
  - Naismith Outstanding Contribution to Basketball: Charles “Lefty” Driesell
- Women
  - Naismith College Player of the Year: Diana Taurasi, Connecticut
  - Naismith College Coach of the Year: Gail Goestenkors, Duke
  - Wade Trophy: Diana Taurasi, Connecticut
  - Frances Pomeroy Naismith Award: Kara Lawson, Tennessee
  - Associated Press Women's College Basketball Player of the Year: Diana Taurasi, Connecticut
  - NCAA basketball tournament Most Outstanding Player: Diana Taurasi, UConn
  - Basketball Academic All-America Team: Kristine Austgulen, VCU
  - Carol Eckman Award: Marsha Sharp, Texas Tech University
  - USBWA National Freshman of the Year: Seimone Augustus, LSU
  - Associated Press College Basketball Coach of the Year: Geno Auriemma, Connecticut
  - List of Senior CLASS Award women's basketball winners: LaToya Thomas, Mississippi State
  - Nancy Lieberman Award: Diana Taurasi, Connecticut
  - Naismith Outstanding Contribution to Basketball: Betty Jaynes

== Deaths ==
- January 20 — Dan King, American NBA player (Baltimore Bullets) (born 1931)
- January 29 — John Murphy, American BAA player (Philadelphia Warriors, New York Knicks) (born 1924)
- February 9 — John Hyder, American college coach (Georgia Tech) (born 1912)
- March 29 — Carl Ridd, Canadian Olympic player (1952) (born 1929)
- April 5 — Helgi Jóhannsson, Icelandic basketball player and coach (born 1929)
- April 16 — Jewell Young, All-American college player (Purdue), NBL player (Indianapolis Kautskys, Oshkosh All-Stars) (born 1913)
- May 14 — Dave DeBusschere, American Hall of Fame NBA player (New York Knicks, Detroit Pistons) (born 1940)
- May 14 — Al Fleming, American NBA player (Seattle SuperSonics) (born 1954)
- May 23 — Weenie Miller, American college coach (VMI) (born 1922)
- May 29 — Anthony Frederick, American NBA player (Indiana Pacers, Sacramento Kings, Charlotte Hornets) (born 1964)
- June 16 — David Polansky, American college coach (CCNY) (born 1919)
- June 22 — John Mandic, American NBA player (born 1919)
- September 20 — Ernie Calverley, All-American player and coach at Rhode Island (born 1924)
- October 16 — Chet Jaworski, All-American player (Rhode Island) (born 1916)
- October 23 — Kevin Magee, Former All-American at UC Irvine and Maccabi Tel Aviv player (born 1959)
- October 30 — Stan Szukala, American NBL player (Chicago Bruins, Chicago American Gears) (born 1918)
- November 21 — Bill Haarlow, American NBL player (Whiting Ciesar All-Americans) (born 1913)
- December 8 — Chuck Noe, American college coach (VMI, Virginia Tech, South Carolina, VCU) (born 1924)
- December 9 — Norm Sloan, College basketball coach of the 1974 national champion NC State Wolfpack (born 1926)
- December 26 — Gale Bishop, All-American college (Washington State) and BAA (Philadelphia Warriors) player (born 1922)

== See also ==
- Timeline of women's basketball
