= 2026 NCAA Division II women's basketball tournament =

- Teams: 64
- Finals site: UPMC Cooper Fieldhouse, Pittsburgh, Pennsylvania
- Champions: Grand Valley State (3rd title)
- Runner-up: Indiana (PA) (1st title game)
- Semifinalists: Alabama-Huntsville (1st Final Four); Colorado Mesa (1st Final Four)

The 2026 NCAA Division II women's basketball tournament was the annual single-elimination tournament hosted by the NCAA to determine the national champion of women's college basketball among its Division II member programs in the United States, culminating the 2025–26 NCAA Division II women's basketball season. The tournament featured 64 teams.

The national quarterfinals (Elite Eight), semifinals, and finals were played from March 24–28, 2026 at the UPMC Cooper Fieldhouse in Pittsburgh.

Grand Valley State defeated Indiana University of Pennsylvania in the championship game, 72–49, the Lakers' third Division II national title and second in a row.

== Tournament schedule and venues ==
2026 NCAA Division II Women's Tournament sites – regionals (blue), Elite Eight (red)

=== Regionals ===
First, second, and third-round games (the latter of which served as a regional championship) were held at campus sites from March 13–16, 2026. The top-seeded team in each regional served as host.

=== Elite Eight ===
The national quarterfinals, semifinals, and finals were held at a predetermined site, the UPMC Cooper Fieldhouse in Pittsburgh. Teams remaining were reseeded for the Elite Eight.

== Automatic bids ==
Automatic bids
Region (Bids)	Conference	School	Record
Atlantic (3)	CIAA	Winston-Salem State	26-3
Atlantic (3)	Mountain East	University of Charleston	21–10
Atlantic (3)	PSAC	Indiana (PA)	26–3
Central (3)	Great American	Northwestern Oklahoma State	22–9
Central (3)	MIAA	Washburn	24–7
Central (3)	Northern Sun	Concordia-St. Paul	24-6
East (3)	CACC	Felician	24–7
East (3)	East Coast	Daemen	24–3
East (3)	Northeast–10	Southern Connecticut State	24–5
Midwest (3)	GLIAC	Grand Valley State	31-1
Midwest (3)	GLVC	Maryville	25–6
Midwest (3)	Great Midwest	Northwood	26-5
South (3)	Gulf South	Union (TN)	24–9
South (3)	SIAC	Miles	25-5
South (3)	Sunshine State	Nova Southeastern	27–4
South Central (2)	Lone Star	Texas Woman's	29–1
South Central (2)	RMAC	Colorado Mesa	33-1
Southeast (3)	Carolinas	Lees-McRae	23–7
Southeast (3)	Peach Belt	Augusta	21–9
Southeast (3)	South Atlantic	Coker	25-6
West (3)	CCAA	Cal State LA	24-6
West (3)	Great Northwest	Montana State Billings	20-14
West (3)	PacWest	Vanguard	24-5

== Bracket ==
=== Atlantic regional ===
- Site: Indiana, Pennsylvania (Indiana (PA))

First round March 13
1	Indiana (PA)	79
8	University of Charleston	53
4	Seton Hill	88**
5	Fayetteville State	85
2	Gannon	76
7	Edinboro	61
3	Winston-Salem State	88
6	Glenville State	71

Regional semifinals March 14
1	Indiana (PA)	94
4	Seton Hill	87
2	Gannon	48
3	Winston-Salem State	67

Regional Finals; March 16
1	Indiana (PA)	65
3	Winston-Salem State	64

=== Central regional ===
- Site: Mankato, Minnesota (Minnesota State)

First round March 13
1	Minnesota State	63
8	Minnesota Duluth	72
4	Central Missouri	64
5	Washburn	55
2	Concordia Saint Paul	52
7	Northwestern Oklahoma State	45
3	Fort Hays State	89
6	Harding	82

Regional semifinals March 14
8	Minnesota Duluth	81
4	Central Missouri	48
2	Concordia Saint Paul	59
3	Fort Hays State	53

Regional Finals; March 16
8	Minnesota Duluth	94
2	Concordia St. Paul	87

=== East regional ===
- Site: New Haven, Connecticut (Southern Connecticut State)

First round March 13
1	Southern Connecticut State	56
8	Saint Michael's	49
4	Assumption	38
5	Holy Family	58
2	Bentley	74
7	Mercy	47
3	Daemen	75
6	Felician	62

Regional semifinals March 14
1	Southern Connecticut State	51
5	Holy Family	61
2	Bentley	55
3	Daemen	58

Regional Finals; March 16
5	Holy Family	78
3	Daemen	62

=== Midwest regional ===
- Site: Allendale, Michigan (Grand Valley State)

First round March 13
1	Grand Valley State	83
8	Maryville	50
4	Wayne State	77
5	Northern Michigan	61
2	Ferris State	59
7	Missouri-Saint Louis	70
3	Northwood	61
6	Malone	57

Regional semifinals March 14
1	Grand Valley State	90
4	Wayne State	70
7	Missouri-Saint Louis	49
3	Northwood	60

Regional Finals; March 16
1	Grand Valley State	69
3	Northwood	59

=== South regional ===
- Site: Huntsville, Alabama (Alabama-Huntsville)

First round March 13
1	Alabama-Huntsville	95
8	Edward Waters	85
4	Miles	71
5	Nova Southeastern	91
2	Union (TN)	84
7	Florida Southern	69
3	Eckerd	85
6	Embry-Riddle (FL)	69

Regional semifinals March 14
1	Alabama-Huntsville	73
5	Nova Southeastern	70
2	Union (TN)	38
3	Eckerd	65

Regional Finals; March 16
1	Alabama-Huntsville	66
3	Eckerd	46

=== South Central regional ===
- Site: Denton, Texas (Texas Woman's)

First round March 13
1	Texas Woman's	68
8	Eastern New Mexico	49
4	UCCS	67
5	Adams State	62
2	West Texas A&M	56
7	UT Tyler	66
3	Colorado Mesa	80
6	Lubbock Christian	45

Regional semifinals March 14
1	Texas Woman's	70
4	UCCS	59
7	UT Tyler	58
3	Colorado Mesa	62

Regional Finals; March 16
1	Texas Woman's	64
3	Colorado Mesa	65

=== Southeast regional ===
- Site: Harrogate, Tennessee (Lincoln Memorial Railsplitters)

First round March 13
1	Lincoln Memorial	68
8	Lees-McRae	53
4	Columbus State	73
5	Carson-Newman	85
2	Lenoir-Rhyne	83
7	Augusta	74
3	Coker	83
6	Francis Marion	54

Regional semifinals March 14
1	Lincoln Memorial	55
5	Carson-Newman	69
2	Lenoir-Rhyne	54
3	Coker	45

Regional Finals; March 16
5	Carson-Newman	72
2	Lenoir-Rhyne	53

=== West regional ===
- Site: Ellensburg, Washington (Central Washington)

First round March 13
1	Central Washington	63
8	Montana State Billings	36
4	Vanguard	79
5	Cal State LA	75
2	Western Washington	74
7	Point Loma	60
3	Cal Poly Pomona	56
6	Azusa Pacific	54

Regional semifinals March 14
1	Central Washington	81
4	Vanguard	73
2	Western Washington	54
3	Cal Poly Pomona	57

Regional Finals; March 16
1	Central Washington	51
3	Cal Poly Pomona	57

=== Elite Eight ===
- Site: UPMC Cooper Fieldhouse, Pittsburgh, Pennsylvania

Elite Eight; March 24; ESPN+
1	Grand Valley State	96
8	Carson-Newman	48
4	Cal Poly Pomona	53
5	Alabama-Huntsville	61
2	Indiana (PA)	57
7	Holy Family	52
3	Colorado Mesa	81
6	Minnesota Duluth	59

Final Four; March 26; ESPN+
1	Grand Valley State	61
5	Alabama-Huntsville	39
2	Indiana (PA)	75
3	Colorado Mesa	70

National Championship; March 28; ESPN+
1	Grand Valley State	72
2	Indiana (PA)	49

* denotes overtime

== See also ==
- 2026 NCAA Division I women's basketball tournament
- 2026 NCAA Division III women's basketball tournament
- 2026 NAIA women's basketball tournament
- 2026 NCAA Division II men's basketball tournament
