= 1998 in basketball =

The following are the basketball events of the year 1998 throughout the world.

== Championships ==
=== World Championships ===
- Men Yugoslavia 64, Russia 62
- Women USA 71, Russia 65

=== Professional ===
- Men
  - 1998 NBA Finals: Chicago Bulls over the Utah Jazz 4-2. MVP: Michael Jordan
    - 1998 NBA Playoffs, 1997-98 NBA season, 1998 NBA draft, 1998 NBA All-Star Game
  - Philippine Basketball Association 1998 season:
    - Alaska Milkmen over the San Miguel Beermen 4-3 in the All-Filipino Cup Finals
    - Alaska Milkmen over the San Miguel Beermen 4-2 in the Commissioner's Finals
    - Formula Shell Zoom Masters over the Mobiline Phone Pals 4-3 in the Governor's Finals
- Women
  - WNBA Finals: Houston Comets over the Phoenix Mercury 2-1. MVP: Cynthia Cooper
    - 1998 WNBA Playoffs, 1998 WNBA season, 1998 WNBA draft

=== College ===
- Men
  - NCAA Division I: University of Kentucky 78, University of Utah 69
  - National Invitation Tournament: University of Minnesota def. Penn State University
  - NCAA Division II: University of California-Davis 83, Kentucky Wesleyan College 77
  - NCAA Division III: University of Wisconsin-Platteville 69, Hope College 53
  - NAIA Division I: Georgetown College (KY) 83, Southern Nazarene University (OK) 69
  - NAIA Division II: Bethel College (Indiana) (IN) 89, Oregon Institute of Technology 87
  - NJCAA Division I: Indian Hills CC, Ottumwa, Iowa 83, Shelby State CC, Memphis, Tennessee 68
- Women
  - NCAA Division I: Purdue University 62, Duke University 45
  - NCAA Division II: North Dakota State University 92, Emporia State University 76
  - NCAA Division III Washington (Mo.) 77, University of Southern Maine 69
  - NAIA Division I: Union College (TN) 73-70 Southern Nazarene University (OK) 70
  - NAIA Division II Walsh University (OH)) 73, University of Mary Hardin-Baylor (TX) 66

=== Preps ===
- USA Today Boys Basketball #1 Ranking: St. John's at Prospect Hall, Frederick, Maryland (25-0) Led by Jason Capel and Damien Wilkins.
- USA Today Girls Basketball #1 Ranking: Christ the King, Queens, New York (27-0) Won the New York Federation Class A title, led by Sue Bird.

== Awards and honors ==
=== Professional ===
- Men
  - NBA Most Valuable Player Award: Michael Jordan
  - NBA Rookie of the Year Award: Tim Duncan
  - NBA Defensive Player of the Year Award: Dikembe Mutombo
  - NBA Coach of the Year Award: Larry Bird, Indiana Pacers
- Women
  - WNBA Most Valuable Player Award: Cynthia Cooper, Houston Comets
  - WNBA Defensive Player of the Year Award: Teresa Weatherspoon, New York Liberty
  - WNBA Rookie of the Year Award: Tracy Reid, Charlotte Sting
  - Kim Perrot Sportsmanship Award: Suzie McConnell Serio, Cleveland Rockers
  - WNBA Coach of the Year Award: Van Chancellor, Houston Comets
  - WNBA Finals Most Valuable Player Award: Cynthia Cooper, Houston Comets

=== Collegiate ===
- Men
  - John R. Wooden Award: Antawn Jamison, North Carolina
  - Naismith College Coach of the Year: Bill Guthridge, North Carolina
  - Frances Pomeroy Naismith Award: Earl Boykins, Eastern Michigan
  - Associated Press College Basketball Player of the Year: Antawn Jamison, North Carolina
  - NCAA basketball tournament Most Outstanding Player: Richard Hamilton, Connecticut
  - USBWA National Freshman of the Year: Larry Hughes, Saint Louis
  - Associated Press College Basketball Coach of the Year: Tom Izzo, Michigan State
  - Naismith Outstanding Contribution to Basketball: Dean Smith
- Women
  - Naismith College Player of the Year: Chamique Holdsclaw, Tennessee
  - Naismith College Coach of the Year: Pat Summitt, Tennessee
  - Wade Trophy: Ticha Penicheiro, Old Dominion
  - Frances Pomeroy Naismith Award: Angie Arnold, Johns Hopkins
  - Associated Press Women's College Basketball Player of the Year: Chamique Holdsclaw, Tennessee
  - NCAA basketball tournament Most Outstanding Player: Chamique Holdsclaw, Tennessee
  - Basketball Academic All-America Team: Lisa Davies, Missouri State
  - Carol Eckman Award: Kay James, Southern Mississippi
  - Associated Press College Basketball Coach of the Year: Pat Summitt, Tennessee

=== Naismith Memorial Basketball Hall of Fame ===
- Class of 1998:
  - Larry Bird
  - Jody Conradt
  - Alex Hannum
  - Marques Haynes
  - Aleksandar Nikolić
  - Arnie Risen
  - Lenny Wilkens

== Movies ==
- BASEketball
- He Got Game

== Deaths ==
- March 11 — Buddy Jeannette, Hall of Fame NBA, NBL and BAA player (born 1917)
- March 17 — Cliff Barker, American basketball player (born 1921)
- May 15 — Earl "Goat" Manigault, legendary street player (born 1944)
- June 8 — McCoy Ingram, 67, American player (Minneapolis Lakers, Harlem Globetrotters).
- July 4 — Jay Taylor, American NBA player (New Jersey Nets) (born 1967)
- August 8 — Sam Balter, member of 1936 US Olympic team (born 1909)
- November 6 — Jack Hartman, American Kansas State University coach (born 1925)
- November 6 — Fred Pralle, All-American college player (Kansas) (born 1916)
- November 13 — Red Holzman, American Basketball Hall of Fame coach who won two NBA championships with the New York Knicks (born 1920)
- December 6 — Radomir Shaper, Serbian player and administrator and FIBA Hall of Fame member (born 1925)
