= Great American Conference men's basketball tournament =

- Conference basketball championship
- Sport: Basketball
- Conference: Great American Conference
- Number of teams: 8
- Format: Single-elimination tournament
- Played: 2012–present
- Current champion: Harding (3rd)
- Most championships: Arkansas Tech (3); Harding (3)
- Official website: GAC men's basketball

Host stadiums
- Southside Arena (2025–present); FireLake Arena (2022–20234); Steelman Field House (2021); Bruin Fieldhouse (2012–2020)

Host locations
- Fort Smith, AR (2025–present); Shawnee, OK (2022–2024); Monticello, AR (2021); Bartlesville, OK (2012–2020)

The Great American Conference men's basketball tournament is the annual conference basketball championship tournament for the Great American Conference.

The tournament has been held annually since 2012, one year after the conference was initially founded. It is a single-elimination tournament and seeding is based on regular season records.

The winner receives the conference's automatic bid to the NCAA Division II men's basketball tournament.

Arkansas Tech and Harding have won the most tournaments, with three each.

== Results ==
Year	Champions	Score	Runner-up	MVP	Venue
2012	Arkansas Tech	69–58	Southwestern Oklahoma State	Jared Williamson, Arkansas Tech	Bruin Fieldhouse (Bartlesville, OK)
2013	Ouachita Baptist	59–54	Arkansas Tech	Colt Fason, Ouachita Baptist	Bruin Fieldhouse (Bartlesville, OK)
2014	Harding	93–86 (OT)	Henderson State	Weston Jameson, Harding	Bruin Fieldhouse (Bartlesville, OK)
2015	Arkansas Tech (2)	80–77	East Central	Mike Balogun, Arkansas Tech	Bruin Fieldhouse (Bartlesville, OK)
2016	Ouachita Baptist (2)	72–56	Harding	Tirrell Brown, Ouachita Baptist	Bruin Fieldhouse (Bartlesville, OK)
2017	East Central	82–67	Arkansas–Monticello	Braxton Reeves, East Central	Bruin Fieldhouse (Bartlesville, OK)
2018	Southern Nazarene	62–57	Arkansas–Monticello	Jhonathan Dunn, Southern Nazarene	Bruin Fieldhouse (Bartlesville, OK)
2019	Southern Nazarene (2)	80–77	Southeastern Oklahoma State	Micah Speight, Southern Nazarene	Bruin Fieldhouse (Bartlesville, OK)
2020	Henderson State	72–61	Oklahoma Baptist	Chris Parker, Henderson State	Bruin Fieldhouse (Bartlesville, OK)
2021	Arkansas–Monticello	75–74	Southern Arkansas	DaJuan Jones, Arkansas–Monticello	Steelman Field House (Monticello, AR)
2022	Southwestern Oklahoma State	66–58	Southern Nazarene	Damion Thornton, Southwestern Oklahoma State	FireLake Arena (Shawnee, OK)
2023	Southern Arkansas	89–69	Arkansas Tech	Brock Schreiner, Southern Arkansas	FireLake Arena (Shawnee, OK)
2024	Arkansas Tech	72–57	Southern Nazarene	Cassius Brooks, Arkansas Tech	FireLake Arena (Shawnee, OK)
2025	Harding (2)	75–74	Southern Nazarene	Keyln McBride, Harding	Southside Arena (Fort Smith, AR)
2026	Harding (3)	73–68	Southern Nazarene	Keyln McBride, Harding	Southside Arena (Fort Smith, AR)

== Championship records ==
School	Finals Appearances	Finals Record	Years
Harding	4	3–1	2014, 2025, 2026
Arkansas Tech	5	3–2	2012, 2015, 2024
Southern Nazarene	6	2–4	2018, 2019
Ouachita Baptist	3	2–1	2013, 2016
Arkansas–Monticello	3	1–2	2021
Southern Arkansas	2	1–1	2023
Southwestern Oklahoma State	2	1–1	2022
Henderson State	2	1–1	2020
East Central	2	1–1	2017
Oklahoma Baptist	1	0–1	
Southeastern Oklahoma State	1	0–1	

- Northwestern Oklahoma State has not yet reached the tournament final.

== See also ==
- Great American Conference women's basketball tournament
- NCAA Division II men's basketball tournament
