= Stonehill Skyhawks men's basketball =

2026–27 Stonehill Skyhawks men's basketball team
- University: Stonehill College
- Head coach: Chris Kraus (14th season)
- Location: Easton, Massachusetts
- Arena: Merkert Gymnasium (capacity: 1,560)
- Conference: Northeast Conference
- Nickname: Skyhawks
- Colors: Purple and white

NCAA Division I tournament Final Four
- Division II: 2006, 2012
Other NCAA Division I tournament results
Elite Eight	Division II: 2006, 2012, 2016
Sweet Sixteen	Division II: 2006, 2012, 2016
Appearances	Division II: 1971, 1973, 1980, 1981, 1982, 1989, 1998, 2006, 2009, 2010, 2011, 2012, 2015, 2016, 2020

Conference tournament champions
- NE-10: 1981, 1982, 1989, 2012

The Stonehill Skyhawks men's basketball team, known previously as the Stonehill Chieftains, represents Stonehill College in Easton, Massachusetts, United States. The Skyhawks currently compete in the Division I Northeast Conference as of July 1, 2022. Stonehill has never appeared in the NCAA Tournament.

The team is currently led by 8th year head coach Chris Kraus and play their home games at Merkert Gymnasium.

== Postseason results ==
=== NCAA Division II Tournament results ===
The Skyhawks appeared in the NCAA Division II tournament fifteen times. Their combined record was 14–14.

Year	Round	Opponent	Result
1971	Regional semifinals	Central Connecticut State	L 99–111
1973	Regional First round	Bridgeport	L 74–77
1980	Regional semifinals	South Dakota State	L 51–74
1981	Regional semifinals	Sacred Heart	L 86–89
1982	Regional semifinals	Southern Connecticut State	L 61–76
1989	Regional semifinals	Bridgeport	L 127–132^{OT}
1998	Regional semifinals Regional finals	New Hampshire College; Saint Rose	W 78–67^{OT} L 87–97
2006	Regional First round Regional semifinals Regional finals Elite Eight; Final Four	Bloomfield; Adelphi; UMass Lowell; Tarleton State; Winona State	W 96–77; W 69–54; W 89–80; W 69–59; L 73–83
2009	Regional First round	Assumption	L 49–61
2010	Regional First round Regional semifinals	Felician; Philadelphia	W 75–52; L 69–71
2011	Regional First round Regional semifinals	Adelphi; Bloomfield	W 73–64; L 66–79
2012	Regional First round Regional semifinals Regional finals Elite Eight; Final Four	District of Columbia; Adelphi; Bloomfield; West Liberty; Western Washington	W 65–61; W 68–58; W 75–70; W 91–90; L 66–71
2015	Regional First round	Southern New Hampshire	L 59–71
2016	Regional First round Regional semifinals Regional finals Elite Eight	Bentley; Southern New Hampshire; Saint Anselm; West Liberty	W 78–62; W 75–74; W 82–76; L 74–75
2020	Regional First round	Jefferson	Cancelled

== See also ==
- Stonehill Skyhawks women's basketball
