= Laure Savasta =

French basketball player (born 1974)

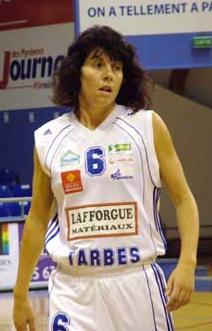

Personal information
- Full name: Laure Savasta
- Born: March 18, 1974 (age 52) Marseille, France
- Height: 5 ft 8 in (1.73 m)
- Weight: 134 lb (61 kg)
Medal record
Women's basketball
Representing France
EuroBasket
Gold medal – first place	2001 France	Team

Laure Savasta (born March 18, 1974, in Marseille) is a French professional basketball player. She plays both point guard and shooting guard. She was, with Isabelle Fijalkowski, amongst the first French players to ever play in the WNBA. Savasta played for the Sacramento Monarchs in the WNBA and was a member of the French national team. She became the only female basketball coach for a professional basketball team.

== Life ==
She was the captain and one of the key players of Tarbes GB, taking part to the French championship and European competitions. Now retired, she started a career of basketball coach and TV commentator, on Sport+, for women's basketball games.

She became the only female basketball coach for a professional basketball team in France when she was given the position at Tarbes Gespe Bigorre.

== Career ==
Seasons	Team	Country
1990–1993	INSEP	France
1993–1994	Cavigal Nice	France
1994–1997	Washington Huskies (Seattle, NCAA)	United States
1997	Sacramento Monarchs (WNBA)	United States
1997–1998	ASPTT Aix-en-Provence	France
1998–2000	US Valenciennes	France
2000–2008	Tarbes GB	France

== Career statistics ==
Legend
GP	Games played	GS	Games started	MPG	Minutes per game	RPG	Rebounds per game
APG	Assists per game	SPG	Steals per game	BPG	Blocks per game	PPG	Points per game
TO	Turnovers per game	FG%	Field-goal percentage	3P%	3-point field-goal percentage	FT%	Free-throw percentage
**Bold**	Career best	°	League leader

=== WNBA ===
==== Regular season ====
Year	Team	GP	GS	MPG	FG%	3P%	FT%	RPG	APG	SPG	BPG	TO	PPG
1997	Sacramento	14	0	11.2	.244	.200	.778	.4	.9	.3	.1	1.5	2.4

== Highlights ==
=== French national team ===
- Champion of Eurobasket Women in 2001
- 5th at the 2000 Summer Olympics of Sydney

=== Club ===
- Runner-up of the European Cup Liliana Ronchetti in 1998 with Aix-en-Provence and 2002 with Tarbes;
- Runner-up of the French championship in 1999 and 2000 with Valenciennes, in 2003 with Tarbes;
- Runner up of the French Cup in 1998.
