= Great American Conference women's basketball tournament =

- Conference basketball championship
- Sport: Basketball
- Conference: Great American Conference
- Number of teams: 8
- Format: Single-elimination tournament
- Played: 2012–present
- Current champion: Northwestern Oklahoma State (1st)
- Most championships: Southwestern Oklahoma State (4)
- Official website: GAC women's basketball

Host stadiums
- Northside Grizzly Arena (2025–2026); FireLake Arena (2022–2024); Sawyer Center (2021); Bruin Fieldhouse (2012–2020)

Host locations
- Fort Smith, AR (2025–2026); Shawnee, OK (2022–2024); Bethany, OK (2021); Bartlesville, OK (2012–2020)

The Great American Conference women's basketball tournament is the annual conference basketball championship tournament for the Great American Conference.

The tournament has been held annually since 2012, one year after the conference was initially founded. It is a single-elimination tournament and seeding is based on regular season records.

The winner receives the conference's automatic bid to the NCAA Division II women's basketball tournament.

Southwestern Oklahoma State has won the most tournaments with four.

== Results ==
Year	Champions	Score	Runner-up	MVP	Venue
2012	Southwestern Oklahoma State	69–58	Harding	Darcie Dick, Southwestern Oklahoma State	Bruin Fieldhouse (Bartlesville, OK)
2013	Arkansas Tech	70–66 (OT)	Southwestern Oklahoma State	Jessica Weatherford, Arkansas Tech	Bruin Fieldhouse (Bartlesville, OK)
2014	Southwestern Oklahoma State (2)	78–74	Harding	Michelle Fisher, Southwestern Oklahoma State	Bruin Fieldhouse (Bartlesville, OK)
2015	Harding	68–50	Arkansas Tech	Sydney Layrock, Harding	Bruin Fieldhouse (Bartlesville, OK)
2016	Arkansas Tech (2)	106–85	Southwestern Oklahoma State	Fatima Adams, Arkansas Tech	Bruin Fieldhouse (Bartlesville, OK)
2017	Harding (2)	75–73	Arkansas Tech	Sydnie Jones, Harding	Bruin Fieldhouse (Bartlesville, OK)
2018	Arkansas Tech (3)	63–62	Harding	Cheyenne North, Arkansas Tech	Bruin Fieldhouse (Bartlesville, OK)
2019	Southwestern Oklahoma State (3)	87–66	Arkansas Tech	Bethany Franks, Southwestern Oklahoma State	Bruin Fieldhouse (Bartlesville, OK)
2020	Southeastern Oklahoma State	71–52	Arkansas–Monticello	Kamryn Cantwell, Southeastern Oklahoma State	Bruin Fieldhouse (Bartlesville, OK)
2021	Southern Nazarene	58–56	Southeastern Oklahoma State	Cassandra Awatt, Southern Nazarene	Sawyer Center (Bethany, OK)
2022	Southwestern Oklahoma State (4)	89–68	Arkansas Tech	Makyra Tramble, Southwestern Oklahoma State	FireLake Arena (Shawnee, OK)
2023	Southern Nazarene (2)	57–46	Harding	Hannah Giddey, Southern Nazarene	FireLake Arena (Shawnee, OK)
2024	Henderson State	71–55	Southwestern Oklahoma State	Ashley Farrar, Henderson State	FireLake Arena (Shawnee, OK)
2025	Harding (3)	69–52	Southeastern Oklahoma State	Sage Hawley, Harding	Northside Grizzly Arena ((Fort Smith, AR)
2026	Northwestern Oklahoma State	71–64	Southeastern Oklahoma State	Kira Bass, Northwestern Oklahoma State	Northside Grizzly Arena ((Fort Smith, AR)

== Championship records ==
School	Finals Appearances	Finals Record	Years
Southwestern Oklahoma State	7	4–3	2012, 2014, 2019, 2022
Harding	7	3–4	2015, 2017, 2025
Arkansas Tech	7	3–4	2013, 2016, 2018
Southern Nazarene	2	2–0	2021, 2023
Southeastern Oklahoma State	4	1–3	2020
Northwestern Oklahoma State	1	1–0	2026
Henderson State	1	1–0	2024
Arkansas–Monticello	1	0–1	

- East Central, , Oklahoma Baptist, Ouachita Baptist, and Southern Arkansas have not yet reached the tournament final.

== See also ==
- Great American Conference men's basketball tournament
- NCAA Division II women's basketball tournament
