= Northeast-10 Conference men's basketball tournament =

- Conference basketball championship
- Sport: Basketball
- Conference: Northeast-10 Conference
- Number of teams: 10
- Format: Single-elimination tournament
- Played: 1981–present
- Current champion: Saint Anselm (11th)
- Most championships: Saint Anselm (11)
- Official website: NE-10 men's basketball

Host locations
- Home court of higher-seeded team (1981–present)

The Northeast-10 Conference men's basketball tournament is the annual conference basketball championship tournament for the Northeast-10 Conference. The tournament has been held annually since 1981. It is a single-elimination tournament and seeding is based on regular season records.

The winner receives the conference's automatic bid to the NCAA Men's Division II Basketball Championship.

== Results ==
Year	Champions	Score	Runner-up	Venue
1981	Stonehill	74–68	Springfield	Easton, MA
1982	Stonehill	74–65	Springfield	Easton, MA
1983	Assumption	96–84	American International	Springfield, MA
1984	American International	70–66	Stonehill	Springfield, MA
1985	American International	77–64	Springfield	Springfield, MA
1986	Springfield	70–65	Merrimack	North Andover, MA
1987	Saint Anselm	109–88	Springfield	Goffstown, NH
1988	Quinnipiac	82–76	Assumption	Worcester, MA
1989	Stonehill	116–111	Bentley	Waltham, MA
1990	Saint Anselm	61–59	American International	Goffstown, NH
1991	Assumption	89–72	Bentley	Worcester, MA
1992	Merrimack	92–77	Saint Anselm	Goffstown, NH
1993	Saint Anselm	79–74	Bentley	Waltham, MA
1994	American International	90–89	Bryant	Springfield, MA
1995	Saint Anselm	71–68	American International	Goffstown, NH
1996	Saint Anselm	80–65	American International	Goffstown, NH
1997	Le Moyne	71–61	Bryant	Smithfield, RI
1998	Assumption	93–73	Saint Anselm	Worcester, MA
1999	Saint Michael's	76–75	Assumption	Colchester, VT
2000	Merrimack	84–78	American International	North Andover, MA
2001	Saint Michael's	74–65	UMass Lowell	Colchester, VT
2002	Bentley	78–72	Saint Anselm	Waltham, MA
2003	UMass Lowell	77–66	SNHU	Lowell, MA
2004	UMass Lowell	67–63	SNHU	Lowell, MA
2005	Saint Anselm	79–72	Bentley	Waltham, MA
2006	Saint Anselm	72–61	Stonehill	Easton, MA
2007	Bentley	71–61	Saint Rose	Waltham, MA
2008	Bentley	93–77	Assumption	Waltham, MA
2009	Assumption	77–63	Le Moyne	Worcester, MA
2010	UMass Lowell	73–58	Adelphi	Lowell, MA
2011	Adelphi	78–72	Bentley	Waltham, MA
2012	Stonehill	73–61	UMass Lowell	Easton, MA
2013	SNHU	85–74	Franklin Pierce	Manchester, NH
2014	Southern Connecticut	73–71	New Haven	New Haven, CT
2015	American International	85–79	Saint Anselm	Springfield, MA
2016	SNHU	90–87	Bentley	Waltham, MA
2017	Saint Anselm	73–68	SNHU	Manchester, NH
2018	Le Moyne	69–63	Saint Anselm	Syracuse, NY
2019	Merrimack	51-46	New Haven	New Haven, CT
2020	Saint Anselm	65–63 (OT)	New Haven	Manchester, NH
2021	Cancelled due to COVID-19 pandemic			
2022	Bentley	68–62	Franklin Pierce	Waltham, MA
2023	Saint Anselm	65–54	New Haven	Manchester, NH
2024	SNHU	75–60	Southern Connecticut	Manchester, NH
2025	SNHU	72–71 (OT)	Pace	Manchester, NH
2026	Saint Anselm	75–69	Saint Michael's	Manchester, NH

== Championship records ==
School	Finals Record	Finals Appearances	Years
Saint Anselm	11–5	16	1987, 1990, 1993, 1995, 1996, 2005, 2006, 2017, 2020, 2023, 2026
Bentley	4–6	10	2002, 2007, 2008, 2022
American International	4–5	9	1984, 1985, 1994, 2015
Southern New Hampshire	4–3	7	2013, 2016, 2024, 2025
Assumption	4–3	7	1983, 1991, 1998, 2009
Stonehill	4–2	6	1981, 1982, 1989, 2012
UMass Lowell	3–2	5	2003, 2004, 2010
Merrimack	3–1	4	1992, 2000, 2019
Saint Michael's	2–1	3	1999, 2001
Le Moyne	2–1	3	1997, 2018
Southern Connecticut	1–1	2	2014
Adelphi	1–1	2	2011
Quinnipiac	1–0	1	1988
Springfield	1–4	5	1986
New Haven	0–4	4	
Bryant	0–2	2	
Franklin Pierce	0–2	2	
Pace	0–1	1	
Saint Rose	0–1	1	
Hartford	0–0	0	

- Schools highlighted in pink are former members of the Northeast-10 Conference

== See also ==
- Northeast-10 Conference women's basketball tournament
