= East Coast Conference men's basketball tournament =

East Coast Conference men's basketball tournament can refer to either:

- East Coast Conference (Division I) men's basketball tournament – for the defunct NCAA Division I conference that existed from 1974–75 to 1993–94
- East Coast Conference (Division II) men's basketball tournament – for the present-day NCAA Division II conference that began in 1989
