= East Coast Conference (Division II) men's basketball tournament =

East Coast Conference men's basketball tournament
- Conference basketball championship
- Sport: Basketball
- Conference: East Coast Conference
- Format: Single-elimination tournament
- Played: 1990–present
- Current champion: Daemen (2nd)
- Most championships: St. Thomas Aquinas (8)
- Official website: ECC men's basketball

The East Coast Conference men's basketball tournament is the annual conference basketball championship tournament for the East Coast Conference. The tournament has been held annually since 1990. It is a single-elimination tournament and seeding is based on regular season records.

The winner receives the EEC's automatic bid to the NCAA Men's Division II Basketball Championship.

== Results ==
Year	Champions	Score	Runner-up
1990	C.W. Post	91–76	Dowling
1991	C.W. Post	70–68	Dowling
1992	Philadelphia College	79–66	Saint Rose
1993	Philadelphia College	85–75	Saint Rose
1994	Philadelphia College	56–54	C.W. Post
1995	Saint Rose	90–68	Adelphi
1996	Adelphi	77–76	Saint Rose
1997	Saint Rose	84–64	Adelphi
1998	Saint Rose	75–70	Adelphi
1999	Adelphi	75–73 (OT)	Saint Rose
2000	Saint Rose	90–72	Molloy
2001	Adelphi	94–78	Philadelphia
2002	Queens	80–63	NYIT
2003	Adelphi	70–57	C.W. Post
2004	C.W. Post	77–65	Philadelphia
2005	Queens	82–74	Philadelphia
2006	Adelphi	74–62	Bridgeport
2007	Adelphi	61–58	C.W. Post
2008	C.W. Post	60–57	Adelphi
2009	C.W. Post	62–56	Bridgeport
2010	Bridgeport	70–61	C.W. Post
2011	C.W. Post	68–64	Bridgeport
2012	LIU Post	86–67	Bridgeport
2013	Bridgeport	61–53	Dowling
2014	Bridgeport	94–73	St. Thomas Aquinas
2015	Bridgeport	82–78	St. Thomas Aquinas
2016	St. Thomas Aquinas	80–63	Daemen
2017	St. Thomas Aquinas	97–86 (OT)	Molloy
2018	St. Thomas Aquinas	82–65	Bridgeport
2019	Molloy	90-86	Bridgeport
2020	St. Thomas Aquinas	74–67	Bridgeport
2021	St. Thomas Aquinas	83–67	Daemen
2022	St. Thomas Aquinas	59–48	Daemen
2023	St. Thomas Aquinas	72–66	Daemen
2024	St. Thomas Aquinas	77–66	Daemen
2025	Daemen	88–80	St. Thomas Aquinas
2026	Daemen	86–66	Roberts Wesleyan

== Championship records ==
School	Finals Record	Finals Appearances	Years
St. Thomas Aquinas	8–3	11	2016, 2017, 2018, 2020, 2021, 2022, 2023, 2024
LIU Post (C.W. Post)	7–4	11	1990, 1991, 2004, 2008, 2009, 2011, 2012
Adelphi	6–4	10	1996, 1999, 2001, 2003, 2006, 2007
Saint Rose	4–4	8	1995, 1997, 1998, 2000
Bridgeport	4–7	11	2010, 2013, 2014, 2015
Jefferson (Philadelphia)	3–3	6	1992, 1993, 1994
Daemen	2–5	7	2025, 2026
Queens	2–0	2	2002, 2005
Molloy	1–2	3	2019
Dowling	0–3	3	
Roberts Wesleyan	0–1	1	
NYIT	0–1	1	

- UDC, D'Youville, Mercy, and Staten Island have not yet qualified for the ECC tournament finals.
- Concordia (NY), New Haven, NJIT, Pace, Southampton College never qualified for the ECC tournament finals as conference members.
- Schools highlighted in pink are former members of the East Coast Conference.
- Schools highlighted in yellow are members of the East Coast Conference with suspended athletics programs.

== See also ==
- East Coast Conference women's basketball tournament
