= Stonehill Skyhawks women's basketball =

Stonehill Skyhawks
2026–27 Stonehill Skyhawks women's basketball team
- College: Stonehill College
- Head coach: Trisha Brown (26th season)
- Location: Easton, Massachusetts
- Arena: Merkert Gymnasium (capacity: 1,560)
- Conference: Northeast Conference
- Nickname: Skyhawks
- Colors: Purple and white

NCAA Division I tournament Final Four
- Division II: 1995
Other NCAA Division I tournament results
Elite Eight	Division II: 1994, 1995, 2018
Sweet Sixteen	Division II: 1987, 1992, 1994, 1995, 1997, 2003, 2009, 2015, 2018
Appearances	Division II: 1983, 1985, 1987, 1988, 1991, 1992, 1993, 1994, 1995, 1996, 1997, 1998, 1999, 2003, 2004, 2006, 2007, 2008, 2009, 2010, 2013, 2014, 2015, 2018, 2019

Conference tournament champions
- NE-10: 1983, 1987, 1995, 1997, 2008, 2020

The Stonehill Skyhawks women's basketball team represents Stonehill College in Easton, Massachusetts, United States. The Skyhawks currently compete in the Division I Northeast Conference after transitioning from the Division II Northeast-10 Conference on July 1, 2022. Due to the NCAA's policy on reclassifying programs, the Skyhawks will not be eligible to compete in the NCAA tournament until the 2026–27 season.

The team is currently led by 21st-year head coach Trisha Brown and play their home games at Merkert Gymnasium.

== Postseason ==
=== NCAA Division II ===
The Skyhawks reached the NCAA Division II women's basketball tournament 25 times. They had a combined record of 26–26.

Year	Round	Opponent	Result
1983	First Round	Bentley	L 62–64
1985	First Round	Bentley	L 52–67
1987	First Round; Sweet Sixteen	Bentley; New Haven	W 52–49; L 64–72
1988	Regional Semifinals	New Haven	L 69–85
1991	Regional Semifinals	Bentley	L 29–79
1992	Regional Semifinals; Regional Finals	St. Augustine's; Bentley	W 96–74; L 60–68
1993	Regional Semifinals	UMass Lowell	L 78–84
1994	Regional Semifinals; Regional Finals; Elite Eight	Saint Anselm; Bentley; Cal State San Bernardino	W 96–89; W 81–64; L 71–82
1995	Regional Semifinals; Regional Finals; Elite Eight; Final Four; Third Place Game	American International; Saint Anselm; Merychurst; Portland State; Missouri Western State	W 80–60; W 83–69; W 80–78; L 59–75; L 66–76
1996	Regional Semifinals	Saint Rose	L 60–68
1997	First Round; Regional Semifinals; Regional Finals	Philadelphia Textile; Saint Rose; Bentley	W 65–50; W 77–60; L 41–52
1998	First Round	Philadelphia Textile	L 59–63
1999	First Round; Regional Semifinals	Binghamton; Saint Rose	W 65–64; L 37–60
2003	First Round; Regional Semifinals; Regional Finals	St. Thomas Aquinas; South Connecticut State; Bentley	W 83–49; W 57–49; L 44–66
2004	First Round; Regional Semifinals	Holy Family; Bryant	W 57–55; L 58–70
2006	First Round; Regional Semifinals	New Haven; American International	W 70–77; L 59–71
2007	First Round	Bentley	L 55–58
2008	First Round; Regional Semifinals	Bryant; Franklin Pierce	W 67–58; L 56–68
2009	First Round; Regional Semifinals; Regional Finals	Saint Rose; Holy Family; Franklin Pierce	W 62–58; W 72–61; L 54–78
2010	First Round; Regional Semifinals	Bentley; Holy Family	W 74–56; L 47–64
2013	First Round; Regional Semifinals	Franklin Pierce; Dowling	W 78–66; L 45–57
2014	First Round; Regional Semifinals	District of Columbia; Bentley	W 79–61; L 63–79
2015	First Round; Regional Semifinals; Regional Finals	Queens; Holy Family; New Haven	W 80–66; W 67–60; L 57–58
2018	First Round; Regional Semifinals; Regional Finals; Elite Eight	Southern Connecticut; St. Thomas Aquinas; University of the Sciences; Indiana (PA)	W 70–45; W 63–52; W 71–61; L 71–75
2019	First Round; Regional Semifinals	Jefferson; Saint Anselm	W 86–77; L 50–59

== See also ==
- Stonehill Skyhawks men's basketball
