= 1998 NAIA Division I women's basketball tournament =

- Teams: 32
- Finals site: Oman Arena, Jackson, Tennessee
- Champions: Union (TN) Bulldogs (1st title, 3rd title game, 4th Fab Four)
- Runner-up: Southern Nazarene Redskins (6th title game, 7th Fab Four)
- Semifinalists: Findlay Oilers (1st Fab Four); Simon Fraser Clan (1st Fab Four)
- Coach of the year: David Blackstock (Union (TN))
- Player of the year: Marieme Lo (Central State (OH))
- Charles Stevenson Hustle Award: April Pearson (Union (TN))
- Chuck Taylor MVP: Rose Agnoung (Union (TN))
- Top scorer: Hazel Taylor (Wayland Baptist) (81 points)

The 1998 NAIA Division I women's basketball tournament was the tournament held by the NAIA to determine the national champion of women's college basketball among its Division I members in the United States and Canada for the 1997–98 basketball season.

In a rematch of the 1997 final, Union (TN) defeated four-time defending champions Southern Nazarene in the championship game, 73–70, to claim the Bulldogs' first NAIA national title.

The tournament was played at the Oman Arena in Jackson, Tennessee.

== Qualification ==
The tournament field remained fixed at thirty-two teams, with the top sixteen teams receiving seeds.

The tournament continued to utilize a simple single-elimination format.

== Bracket ==
First round
1	Union (TN)	78
Pikeville	51
SW Oklahoma State	62
16	Montana State Northern	65
9	Rockhurst	75
Vanguard	61
Claflin	53
8	Oklahoma Baptist	86
5	Phillips	65
Incarnate Word	55
Indiana–South Bend	63
12	Lewis–Clark State	96
13	Western Washington	69
Findlay	76
Georgia Southwestern	66
4	Xavier Louisiana	70
3	Southern Nazarene	100
St. Vincent	71
NW Oklahoma State	63
14	SE Oklahoma State	68
11	Central State (OH)	64
Oklahoma City	75
LeTourneau	56
6	Campbellsville	95
7	Wayland Baptist	89
Louisiana College	72
Freed–Hardeman	31
10	Auburn Montgomery	63
15	Lipscomb	72
East Central (OK)	78
McKendree	39
2	Simon Fraser	78

Second round
1	Union (TN)	76
16	Montana State Northern	63
9	Rockhurst	51
8	Oklahoma Baptist	73
5	Phillips	61
12	Lewis–Clark State	88
Findlay	82
4	Xavier Louisiana	63
3	Southern Nazarene	75
14	SE Oklahoma State	65
Oklahoma City	51
6	Campbellsville	69
7	Wayland Baptist	69*
10	Auburn Montgomery	62
East Central (OK)	58
2	Simon Fraser	67

Elite Eight
1	Union (TN)	99*
8	Oklahoma Baptist	92
12	Lewis–Clark State	70
Findlay	84
3	Southern Nazarene	72
6	Campbellsville	67
7	Wayland Baptist	64
2	Simon Fraser	80

Final Four
1	Union (TN)	80
Findlay	64
3	Southern Nazarene	66
2	Simon Fraser	63

National championship
1	Union (TN)	73
3	Southern Nazarene	70

== See also ==
- 1998 NAIA Division I men's basketball tournament
- 1998 NCAA Division I women's basketball tournament
- 1998 NCAA Division II women's basketball tournament
- 1998 NCAA Division III women's basketball tournament
- 1998 NAIA Division II women's basketball tournament
