= East Coast Conference (Division II) women's basketball tournament =

East Coast Conference women's basketball tournament
- Conference basketball championship
- Sport: Basketball
- Conference: East Coast Conference
- Format: Single-elimination tournament
- Played: 1991–present
- Current champion: Daemen (6th)
- Most championships: Daemen (6); Saint Rose (6)
- Official website: ECC women's basketball

The East Coast Conference women's basketball tournament is the annual conference women's basketball championship tournament for the East Coast Conference. The tournament has been held annually since 1991. It is a single-elimination tournament and seeding is based on regular season records.

The winner receives the conference's automatic bid to the NCAA Division II Women's Basketball Championship.

Daemen and Saint Rose, the latter a former member of the ECC, have the most tournament titles, with six each.

== Results ==
Year	Champions	Score	Runner-up	Most Outstanding Player
1991	Pace	66–64	C.W. Post	Tina Thorpe, Pace
1992	Pace (2)	64–58	Philadelphia Textile	Tammy Greene, Philadelphia Textile
1993	Philadelphia Textile	62–54	Pace	Tammy Greene, Philadelphia Textile
1994	Philadelphia Textile (2)	59–51	Pace	Tammy Greene, Philadelphia Textile
1995	Saint Rose	58–56	Philadelphia Textile	Krista Kandere, Saint Rose
1996	Saint Rose (2)	80–69	Philadelphia Textile	Not awarded
1997	Saint Rose (3)	91–71	Pace	Evija Azace, Saint Rose
1998	Saint Rose (4)	102–67	Philadelphia Textile	Krista Kandere, Saint Rose
1999	Saint Rose (5)	89–66	Philadelphia Textile	Not awarded
2000	Saint Rose (6)	93–48	Dowling	Not awarded
2001	C.W. Post	69–66	Philadelphia	Sheila Jackson, C.W. Post
2002	Adelphi	58–50	Dowling	Alexis Seeley, Adelphi
2003	Dowling	63–60	St. Thomas Aquinas	Zulmary Andino, Dowling
2004	Adelphi (2)	77–65	St. Thomas Aquinas	Melanie Mangone, Adelphi
2005	Bridgeport	61–45	NYIT	Krista Ross, Bridgeport
2006	New Haven	64–50	C.W. Post	Adelina Gentry, New Haven
2007	New Haven (2)	75–74	C.W. Post	Ashley Hilton, New Haven
2008	Molloy	76–59	New Haven	Kymira Woodberry, Molloy
2009	Queens	75–49	Dowling	Amanda Bartlett, Queens
2010	Molloy (2)	49–42	Bridgeport	Kymira Woodberry, Molloy
2011	C.W. Post (2)	69–66	Bridgeport	Janea Aiken, C.W. Post
2012	Dowling (2)	59–54	St. Thomas Aquinas	Kelly Puwalski, Dowling & Sarah Schicher, Dowling
2013	Dowling (3)	72–49	NYIT	Christine Verrelle, Dowling
2014	District of Columbia	67–57	LIU Post	Telisha Turner, District of Columbia
2015	Queens (2)	65–63	NYIT	Madison Rowland, Queens
2016	Queens (3)	60–54	Roberts Wesleyan	Madison Rowland, Queens
2017	Molloy (3)	56–53	NYIT	Aliyah McDonald, Molloy
2018	St. Thomas Aquinas	53–40	NYIT	Jenna Erickson, St. Thomas Aquinas
2019	NYIT	80–60	LIU Post	Meg Knollmeyer, NYIT
2020	Daemen	68–56	Molloy	Katie Titus, Daemen
2021	Roberts Wesleyan	59–53	Daemen	Taryn Wilson, Roberts Wesleyan
2022	Daemen	74–67	Molloy	Kaytlyn Matz, Daemen
2023	Daemen	66–51	St. Thomas Aquinas	Gabby McDuffie, Daemen
2024	Daemen	55–50	Mercy	Alahna Paige, Daemen
2025	Daemen	76–68	Staten Island	Cecilia Lapertosa, Daemen
2026	Daemen	73–68	Mercy	Ne’vaeh Buntley, Daemen

== Championship records ==
School	Finals Record	Finals Appearances	Years
Daemen	6–1	7	2020, 2022, 2023, 2024, 2025, 2026
Saint Rose	6–0	6	1995, 1996, 1997, 1998, 1999, 2000
Dowling	3–3	6	2003, 2012, 2013
Molloy	3–2	5	2008, 2010, 2017
Queens	3–0	3	2009, 2015, 2016
Jefferson (Philadelphia, Philadelphia Textile)	2–6	8	1993, 1994
LIU Post (C.W. Post)	2–6	8	2001, 2011
Pace	2–3	5	1991, 1992
New Haven	2–1	3	2006, 2007
Adelphi	2–0	2	2002, 2004
NYIT	1–5	6	2019
St. Thomas Aquinas	1–4	5	2018
Bridgeport	1–2	3	2005
Roberts Wesleyan	1–1	2	2021
District of Columbia	1–0	1	2014
Mercy	0–2	2	
Staten Island	0–1	1	

- D'Youville have not yet qualified for the ECC tournament finals.
- Concordia (NY), NJIT, and Southampton College never qualified for the ECC tournament finals as conference members.
- Schools highlighted in yellow have temporarily suspended their athletics programs.
- Schools highlighted in pink are former members of the ECC.

== See also ==
- East Coast Conference men's basketball tournament
