= North Carolina Central Eagles women's basketball =

2026–27 North Carolina Central Eagles women's basketball team
- University: North Carolina Central University
- Head coach: Olivia Gaines (1st season)
- Location: Durham, North Carolina
- Arena: McDougald–McLendon Arena (capacity: 3,056)
- Conference: MEAC
- Nickname: Eagles
- Colors: Maroon and gray

NCAA Division I tournament appearances
- 1984*, 2001*, 2002*, 2006*, 2007*

Conference tournament champions
- CIAA: 1984, 2007
- * Division II

The North Carolina Central Lady Eagles basketball team is the basketball team that represents North Carolina Central University, which is located in Durham, North Carolina. The team currently competes in the Mid-Eastern Athletic Conference.

== Postseason ==
=== NCAA Division II tournament results ===
The Lady Eagles made five appearances in the NCAA Division II women's basketball tournament. They had a combined record of 5–5.

Year	Round	Opponent	Result
1984	First round	Virginia Union	L, 51–75
2001	First round Regional semifinals	Wingate; Columbus State	W, 81–67; L, 69–71
2002	First round Regional semifinals	Georgia College; USC Aiken; Mars Hill	W, 74–62; W, 79–62; L, 64–69
2006	First round Second Round	Georgia College; Shaw	W, 51–48; L, 65–80
2007	First round Second Round	Newberry; Georgia College	W, 73–66; L, 63–72
