= 2003 NAIA Division I women's basketball tournament =

- Teams: 32
- Finals site: Oman Arena, Jackson, Tennessee
- Champions: Southern Nazarene Crimson Storm (6th title, 8th title game, 12th Fab Four)
- Runner-up: Oklahoma City Stars (6th title game, 6th Fab Four)
- Semifinalists: USAO Drovers (1st Fab Four); Vanguard Lions (1st Fab Four)
- Coach of the year: Craig Wiginton (Southern Nazarene)
- Player of the year: Kesha Watson (Oklahoma City)
- Charles Stevenson Hustle Award: Heather McNutt (Southern Nazarene)
- Chuck Taylor MVP: Sasha Seriogina (Southern Nazarene)
- Top scorer: Kesha Watson (Oklahoma City) (122 points)

The 2003 NAIA Division I women's basketball tournament was the tournament held by the NAIA to determine the national champion of women's college basketball among its Division I members in the United States and Canada for the 2002–03 basketball season.

Southern Nazarene upset four-time defending champions Oklahoma City in the championship game, 71–70, to claim the Crimson Storm's sixth NAIA national title and first since abandoning its prior Redskins nickname.

The tournament was played at the Oman Arena in Jackson, Tennessee.

== Qualification ==
The tournament field remained fixed at thirty-two teams, although a modification was made to the seeding system utilized for the past twelve tournaments. Instead of seeding just the top sixteen teams, all teams were sorted into one of four quadrants and seeded from 1st to 8th within that quadrant.

The tournament otherwise continued to utilize a simple single-elimination format.

== Bracket ==
First round
1	Oklahoma City	97
8	Berry	47
5	Xavier Louisiana	64
4	Trevecca Nazarene	55
3	North Georgia	64
6	Oklahoma Baptist	47
7	Columbia (MO)	60
2	Central State (OH)	74
1	Dillard	47
8	USAO	73
5	Pikeville	40
4	The Master's	64
3	Montana Western	75
6	Saint Xavier	51
7	Wayland Baptist	77
2	Freed–Hardeman	62
1	Houston Baptist	83
8	Claflin	63
5	Point Loma Nazarene	71
4	Campbellsville	49
3	Brescia	66
6	Lewis–Clark State	51
7	Brewton–Parker	40
2	Southern Nazarene	75
1	Union (TN)	58
8	Langston	48
5	Oklahoma Christian	76
4	Georgetown (KY)	62
3	Auburn Montgomery	56
6	Transylvania	57
7	Mobile	48
2	Vanguard	62

Second round
1	Oklahoma City	91
5	Xavier Louisiana	53
3	North Georgia	65
2	Central State (OH)	76
8	USAO	56
4	The Master's	51
3	Montana Western	57
7	Wayland Baptist	68
1	Houston Baptist	68
5	Point Loma Nazarene	75
3	Brescia	61
2	Southern Nazarene	71
1	Union (TN)	64
5	Oklahoma Christian	65
6	Transylvania	54
2	Vanguard	70

Elite Eight
1	Oklahoma City	83
2	Central State (OH)	73
8	USAO	66
7	Wayland Baptist	50
5	Point Loma Nazarene	61
2	Southern Nazarene	74
5	Oklahoma Christian	60
2	Vanguard	61

Final Four
1	Oklahoma City	72
8	USAO	52
2	Southern Nazarene	62
2	Vanguard	49

National championship
1	Oklahoma City	70
2	Southern Nazarene	71

== See also ==
- 2003 NAIA Division I men's basketball tournament
- 2003 NCAA Division I women's basketball tournament
- 2003 NCAA Division II women's basketball tournament
- 2003 NCAA Division III women's basketball tournament
- 2003 NAIA Division II women's basketball tournament
