= Northeast-10 Conference women's basketball tournament =

Northeast-10 Conference men's basketball tournament
- Conference basketball championship
- Sport: Basketball
- Conference: Northeast-10 Conference
- Number of teams: 10
- Format: Single-elimination tournament
- Played: 1982–present
- Current champion: Southern Connecticut (3rd)
- Most championships: Bentley (24)
- Official website: NE-10 women's basketball

Host locations
- Home court of higher-seeded team (1982–present)

The Northeast-10 Conference men's basketball tournament is the annual conference women's basketball championship tournament for the Northeast-10 Conference. The tournament has been held annually since 1982. It is a single-elimination tournament and seeding is based on regular season records.

The winner receives the Northeast-10's automatic bid to the NCAA Women's Division II Basketball Championship.

Bentley has been the most successful program, with 24 titles.

== Results ==
Year	Champions	Score	Runner-up	Venue
1982	Bentley	80–65	Springfield	Springfield, MA
1983	Stonehill	58–54	Saint Anselm	Goffstown, NH
1984	Bentley	75–63	Bryant	Smithfield, RI
1985	Bentley	63–60	Stonehill	Easton, MA
1986	Bryant	65–59	Saint Anselm	Goffstown, NH
1987	Stonehill	58–53	Bentley	Easton, MA
1988	Bryant	71–63	Bentley	Waltham, MA
1989	Bryant	71–70	Bentley	Waltham, MA
1990	Bentley	80–72	Saint Anselm	Waltham, MA
1991	Saint Anselm	81–76	Bentley	Waltham, MA
1992	Bentley	78–48	Stonehill	Waltham, MA
1993	Bentley	75–64	Stonehill	Waltham, MA
1994	Bentley	75–61	American International	Easton, MA
1995	Stonehill	82–69	Saint Anselm	Easton, MA
1996	Bentley	79–52	American International	Easton, MA
1997	Stonehill	57–48	Bentley	Waltham, MA
1998	Bentley	70–54	Stonehill	Waltham, MA
1999	Bentley	63–53	Saint Anselm	Waltham, MA
2000	Bentley	85–58	Merrimack	Waltham, MA
2001	Bentley	60–58	Saint Rose	Waltham, MA
2002	American International	65–50	Le Moyne	Worcester, MA
2003	Bentley	0–0	UMass Lowell	Waltham, MA
2004	Merrimack	73–57	Bentley	North Andover, MA
2005	Bentley	61–53 (OT)	Merrimack	North Andover, MA
2006	Southern Connecticut	60–51	Saint Rose	New Haven, CT
2007	Southern Connecticut	73–57	Pace	New Haven, CT
2008	Stonehill	90–79	Bryant	Easton, MA
2009	Franklin Pierce	70–59	Stonehill	Rindge, NH
2010	Franklin Pierce	70–59	Stonehill	Rindge, NH
2011	Bentley	85–71	Franklin Pierce	Waltham, MA
2012	Bentley	79–52	Southern Connecticut	Waltham, MA
2013	Bentley	68–59	Assumption	Waltham, MA
2014	Bentley	99–76	Adelphi	Waltham, MA
2015	Adelphi	79–57	American International	Garden City, NY
2016	Bentley	67–60	American International	Waltham, MA
2017	Adelphi	67–59	Bentley	Waltham, MA
2018	Bentley	73–72 (OT)	Stonehill	Easton, MA
2019	Le Moyne	67–45	Bentley	Waltham, MA
2020	Stonehill	80–61	Saint Anselm	Easton, MA
2021	Cancelled due to COVID-19 pandemic			
2022	Bentley	56–49	Stonehill	Waltham, MA
2023	Bentley	61–49	SNHU	Manchester, NH
2024	Bentley	64–49	Southern Connecticut	Waltham, MA
2025	Bentley	64–54	Assumption	Waltham, MA
2026	Southern Connecticut	59–50	Bentley	Waltham, MA

== Championship records ==
School	Finals Record	Finals Appearances	Years
Bentley	25–9	34	1982, 1984, 1985, 1990, 1992, 1993, 1994, 1996, 1998, 1999, 2000, 2001, 2003, 2005, 2011, 2012, 2013, 2014, 2016, 2018, 2022, 2023, 2024, 2025
Stonehill	6–8	14	1983, 1987, 1995, 1997, 2008, 2020
Southern Connecticut	3–2	5	2006, 2007, 2026
Bryant	3–2	5	1986, 1988, 1989
Adelphi	2–1	3	2015, 2017
Franklin Pierce	2–1	3	2009, 2010
Saint Anselm	1–6	7	1991
American International	1–4	5	2002
Merrimack	1–2	3	2004
Le Moyne	1–1	2	2019
Assumption	0–2	2	
Saint Rose	0–2	2	
Southern New Hampshire	0–1	1	
Pace	0–1	1	
Springfield	0–1	1	
UMass Lowell	0–1	1	

- New Haven and Saint Michael's have not yet qualified for the tournament finals
- Hartford and Quinnipiac never qualified for the tournament finals as conference members
- Schools highlighted in pink are former members of the NE-10

== See also ==
- Northeast-10 Conference men's basketball tournament
