= 2003 NCAA Division II men's basketball tournament =

- Teams: 64
- Finals site: Lakeland Center, Lakeland, Florida
- Champions: Northeastern State (1st title)
- Runner-up: ~~Kentucky Wesleyan~~ (13th title game)
- Semifinalists: Bowie State (1st Final Four); Queens (NC) (1st Final Four)
- Winning coach: Larry Gipson (1st title)
- MOP: Darnell Hinson (Northeastern State)

The 2003 NCAA Division II men's basketball tournament was the 47th annual single-elimination tournament to determine the national champion of men's NCAA Division II college basketball in the United States.

Officially culminating the 2002–03 NCAA Division II men's basketball season, the tournament featured, for the first time, sixty-four teams from around the country.

The Elite Eight, national semifinals, and championship were played, for the first time, at the Lakeland Center in Lakeland, Florida.

Northeastern State (32–3) defeated Kentucky Wesleyan in the final, 75–64, to win their first Division II national championship.

It was concurrently Kentucky Wesleyan's sixth straight appearance in the title game (winning in 1999 and 2001), although this appearance, along with that from 2002, would later be vacated by the NCAA.

The winning Redmen were coached by Larry Gipson. Northeastern State's Darnell Hinson was the Most Outstanding Player.

2003 NCAA Division II Men's sites - regionals (cyan) Elite Eight (red)

== Regionals ==
=== East - Charlotte, North Carolina ===
Location: Ovens Athletic Center Host: Queens University of Charlotte

First round Round of 64; March 14
1	Queens (NC)	72
8	West Chester	58
4	Salem International	76
5	California (PA)	73
3	Millersville	62
6	Belmont Abbey	56
2	Barton (OT)	81
7	Alderson Broaddus	76

Regional semifinal Round of 32; March 15
1	Queens (NC)	100
4	Salem International	87
3	Millersville	80
2	Barton	63

Regional final Sweet 16; March 17
1	Queens (NC)	94
3	Millersville	77

=== South - Winter Park, Florida ===
Location: Warden Arena Host: Rollins College

First round Round of 64; March 14
1	Rollins	76
8	Alabama–Huntsville	61
5	Morehouse	66
4	Eckerd	83
6	Delta State	72
3	Florida Southern	70
2	Henderson State	67
7	Harding	59

Regional semifinal Round of 32; March 15
1	Rollins	70
4	Eckerd	74
6	Delta State	60
2	Henderson State	67

Regional final Sweet 16; March 17
4	Eckerd	85
2	Henderson State	75

=== South Central - Stephenville, Texas ===
Location: Wisdom Gymnasium Host: Tarleton State University

First round Round of 64; March 14
1	Tarleton State	56
8	St. Mary's (TX)	43
4	Missouri Western	61
5	Northwest Missouri State	71
6	West Texas A&M	63
3	Washburn	75
2	Northeastern State	78
7	Central Oklahoma	67

Regional semifinal Round of 32; March 15
1	Tarleton State	73
5	Northwest Missouri State	58
3	Washburn	59
2	Northeastern State	64

Regional final Sweet 16; March 17
1	Tarleton State	46
2	Northeastern State	56

=== North Central - Kearney, Nebraska ===
Location: Cushing Coliseum Host: University of Nebraska at Kearney

First round Round of 64; March 14
1	Nebraska–Kearney	72
8	Minnesota-Duluth	67
4	South Dakota State	84
5	Fort Hays State	78
6	Fort Lewis	63
3	Metro State	85
2	St. Cloud State	74
7	North Dakota	69

Regional semifinal Round of 32; March 15
1	Nebraska–Kearney	86
4	South Dakota State	85
3	Metro State	75
2	St. Cloud State	63

Regional final Sweet 16; March 17
1	Nebraska–Kearney (OT)	94
3	Metro State	87

=== Northeast – Lowell, Massachusetts ===
Location: Costello Gym Host: University of Massachusetts at Lowell

First round Round of 64; March 14
1	UMass-Lowell	91
8	St. Rose	67
4	Adelphi	56
5	Bridgeport	64
6	New Haven	76
3	Southern New Hampshire	71
2	Long Island-C.W. Post (OT)	81
7	Assumption	75

Regional semifinal Round of 32; March 15
1	UMass-Lowell	86
5	Bridgeport	73
6	New Haven	61
2	Long Island-C.W. Post	78

Regional final Sweet 16; March 17
1	UMass-Lowell	65
2	Long Island-C.W. Post	59

=== South Atlantic - Columbus, Georgia ===
Location: Lumpkin Center Host: Columbus State University

First round Round of 64; March 14
1	Columbus State	59
8	Presbyterian	71
4	Johnson C. Smith	58
5	Shaw	72
6	Virginia Union	65
3	Kennesaw State	74
2	Bowie State	88
7	Lenoir–Rhyne	82

Regional semifinal Round of 32; March 15
8	Presbyterian	77
5	Shaw	58
3	Kennesaw State	70
2	Bowie State	95

Regional final Sweet 16; March 17
8	Presbyterian	53
2	Bowie State	67

=== Great Lakes - Houghton, Michigan ===
Location: Student Development Center Gymnasium Host: Michigan Technological University

First round Round of 64; March 14
1	Michigan Tech	90
8	Indianapolis	75
4	Southern Indiana	82
5	Lewis	63
6	Findlay	80
3	Northern Kentucky	76
2	~~Kentucky Wesleyan~~	81
7	Gannon	74

Regional semifinal Round of 32; March 15
1	Michigan Tech	71
4	Southern Indiana	74
6	Findlay	66
2	~~Kentucky Wesleyan~~	83

Regional final Sweet 16; March 17
4	Southern Indiana	91
2	~~Kentucky Wesleyan~~	95

Kentucky Wesleyan's participation in the 2002-2004 tournaments was vacated by the NCAA due to a widespread problem with athlete eligibility.

=== West - Laie, Hawaii ===
Location: George Q. Cannon Activities Center Host: Brigham Young University-Hawai'i

First round Round of 64; March 14
1	BYU–Hawaii	41
8	Cal State Bakersfield	50
4	Cal Poly Pomona	80
5	Alaska–Fairbanks	76
6	Hawaii–Hilo	81
3	Humboldt State	102
2	Cal State San Bernardino	86
7	Sonoma State	56

Regional semifinal Round of 32; March 15
8	Cal State Bakersfield	49
4	Cal Poly Pomona	62
3	Humboldt State	68
2	Cal State San Bernardino	80

Regional final Sweet 16; March 17
4	Cal Poly Pomona (2OT)	91
2	Cal State San Bernardino	84

== Elite Eight-Lakeland, Florida ==
Location: Jenkins Field House Host: Florida Southern College

National Quarterfinals; Elite Eight; March 26
SA	Bowie State	72
NE	UMass Lowell	62
GL	~~Kentucky Wesleyan~~	85
W	Cal Poly Pomona	60
Lakeland, Florida
E	Queens (NC)	99
S	Eckerd	78
SC	Northeastern State	94
NC	Nebraska–Kearney	75

National semifinals Final Four; March 27
SA	Bowie State	64
GL	~~Kentucky Wesleyan~~	84
E	Queens (NC)	69
SC	Northeastern State	84

National championship March 29
GL	~~Kentucky Wesleyan~~	64
SC	Northeastern State	75

- Note: Kentucky Wesleyan's performance was vacated by the NCAA.

== All-tournament team ==
- Darnell Hinson. Northeastern State (MOP)
- Shon Robinson, Northeastern State
- Derek Cline, Northeastern State
- Marlon Parmer, Kentucky Wesleyan
- ~~Eugene Dabney, Kentucky Wesleyan~~

== See also ==
- 2003 NCAA Division II women's basketball tournament
- 2003 NCAA Division I men's basketball tournament
- 2003 NCAA Division III men's basketball tournament
- 2003 NAIA Division I men's basketball tournament
- 2003 NAIA Division II men's basketball tournament
