= 1981 NAIA men's basketball tournament =

College basketball tournament

- Teams: 32
- Finals site: Kemper Arena; Kansas City, Missouri
- Champions: Bethany Nazarene (Okla.) (1st title, 1st title game, 1st Fab Four)
- Runner-up: Alabama – Huntsville (1st title game, 1st Fab Four)
- Semifinalists: Wisconsin–Eau Claire (3rd Final Four); Hillsdale (Mich.) (1st Final Four)
- Coach of the year: Ken Anderson (Wisconsin–Eau Claire)
- Charles Stevenson Hustle Award: James Mundie (Alabama-Huntsville)
- Chuck Taylor MVP: George Torres (Bethany Nazarene)
- Top scorers: Todd Thurman (Bethany Nazarene); George Torres (Bethany Nazarene) (104 points)

The 1981 NAIA men's basketball tournament was held in March at Kemper Arena in Kansas City, Missouri. The 44th annual NAIA basketball tournament featured 32 teams playing in a single-elimination format. The championship game featured Bethany Nazarene College and the University of Alabama in Huntsville. It was the first time that the championship game went into overtime. Bethany Nazarene edged out Alabama-Huntsville with the final score of 86-85 (OT). 1981 was also the first year the NAIA held a women's national basketball championship tournament. For the second time since 1963, the year the award was established, there was a tie for the leading scorer. Todd Thurman and George Torres both scored 104 over the course of the 1981 tournament. There have been no ties since. And for the first time since the Coach of the Year Award was established, Ken Anderson, won Coach of the Year for the second time. No other coach has won the award twice.

== Awards and honors ==
- Leading scorers; tie: Todd Thurman, Bethany Nazarene (Okla.); 5 games, 42 field goals, 20 free throws, totaling 104 points (averaging 20.8 points per game); George Torres, Bethany Nazarene (Okla.); 5 games, 33 field goals, 38 free throws, totaling 104 points (averaging 20.8 points per game)
- Leading rebounder: Ricky Knight, Alabama-Huntsville. In 5 games, 62 total rebounds (averaging 12.4 rebounds per game)
- Player of the Year: est. 1994
- All-time leading scorer; second appearance: Tony Carr 13th, Wisconsin–Eau Claire (1979,80,81,82); 15 games, 114 field goals, 45 free throws, totaling 273 points (18.2 average points per game).

== 1981 NAIA bracket ==
First round	Second round
1	Briar Cliff (Iowa)	76
-	Fairmont State (W. Virginia)	67
1	Briar Cliff	46
16	Hillsdale	53
-	Dominican (N.Y.)	64
16	Hillsdale (Mich.)	70
TOP TIER
9	Western New Mexico	55
-	Midwestern State (Texas)	56
-	Midwestern State	104
-	Lincoln Memorial	87
-	Lincoln Memorial (Tenn.)	71
8	Rockhurst (Mo.)	68
5	Alabama-Huntsville	105
-	Norfolk State (Virginia)	75
5	Alabama-Huntsville	67
12	Oregon College	62
-	Xavier (La.)	66
12	Oregon College	98
TOP TIER
13	Henderson State (Ark.)	50
-	South Carolina-Spartanburg	61
-	South Carolina-Spartanburg	60
-	Hanover	72
-	Hanover (Ind.)	66
4	Fort Hays State (Kan.)	64
3	Augsburg (Minn.)	56
-	Drury (Mo.)	54
3	Augsburg	81
14	Kearney State	77
-	Campbellsville (Ky.)	96
14	Kearney State (Neb.)	108
BOTTOM TIER
11	Southern Tech (Ga.)	82
-	Franklin Pierce (N.H.)	75
-	Southern Tech	58
6	Bethany Nazarene	88
-	Chicago State (Ill.)	63
6	Bethany Nazarene (Okla.)	69
7	Huron (S.D.)	59
-	Gardner–Webb (N. C.)	52
7	Huron	52
10	Biola	50
-	Central Washington	42
10	Biola (California)	57
BOTTOM TIER
15	Cedarville (Ohio)	57
-	Waynesburg (Pa.)	60
-	Waynesburg	21
2	Wisconsin–Eau Claire	22
-	St. Mary's (Texas)	59
2	Wisconsin–Eau Claire	61

Elite Eight
16	Hillsdale	65
-	Midwestern State	64
5	Alabama-Huntsville	94
-	Hanover	74
3	Augsburg	69
6	Bethany Nazarene	84
7	Huron	29
2	Wisconsin–Eau Claire	35

NAIA national semifinals
16	Hillsdale	60
5	Alabama-Huntsville	65
6	Bethany Nazarene	62
2	Wisconsin–Eau Claire	54

NAIA national championship
5	Alabama-Huntsville	85*
6	Bethany Nazarene	86

- * denotes overtime.

=== Third-place game ===
The third-place game featured the losing teams from the national semifinalist to determine 3rd and 4th places in the tournament. This game was played until 1988.

NAIA third-place game
16	Hillsdale	60
2	Wisconsin–Eau Claire	90

== See also ==
- 1981 NCAA Division I basketball tournament
- 1981 NCAA Division II basketball tournament
- 1981 NCAA Division III basketball tournament
- 1981 NAIA women's basketball tournament
