= 2003 NAIA Division II men's basketball tournament =

- Teams: 32
- Finals site: Keeter Gymnasium; Point Lookout, Missouri
- Champions: Northwestern Red Raiders (2nd title, 3rd title game, 4th Fab Four)
- Runner-up: Bethany Swedes (1st title game, 1st Fab Four)
- Semifinalists: Cornerstone Golden Eagles (4th Fab Four); Warner Southern Royals (1st Fab Four)
- Charles Stevenson Hustle Award: Bryan Edwards (Cornerstone)
- Chuck Taylor MVP: Brandon Woudstra (Northwestern (IA))
- Attendance: 32,538
- Top scorer: Brandon Woudstra (Northwestern (IA)) (117 points)

The 2003 NAIA Division II men's basketball tournament was the tournament held by the NAIA to determine the national champion of men's college basketball among its Division II members in the United States and Canada for the 2002–03 basketball season.

Top-seeded Northwestern (IA) defeated unseeded Bethany (KS) in the championship game, 77–57, to claim the Red Raiders' second NAIA national title and second in three years.

The tournament was played at Keeter Gymnasium on the campus of the College of the Ozarks in Point Lookout, Missouri.

== Qualification ==
The tournament field remained fixed at thirty-two teams, and the top sixteen teams were seeded.

The tournament continued to utilize a single-elimination format.

== Bracket ==
First round
1	Northwestern (IA)	99
Presentation (SD)	72
Flagler	72
16	William Jewell	87
9	Huntington (IN)	71
Holy Family	68
Saint Ambrose	84
8	Cedarville	94
5	Saint Vincent	76
Bethel (KS)	62
UVA Wise	73
12	Cornerstone	78
13	Cascade	79
Black Hills State	73
Cal State Hayward	44
4	Bellevue (NE)	76
3	Jamestown	96
Indiana Southeast	65
Albertson	53
14	Taylor	44
11	Warner Southern	75
Rio Grande	58
College of the Ozarks	72
6	Siena Heights	69
7	MidAmerica Nazarene	61
Bethany (KS)	72
Husson	67
10	Oregon Tech	81
15	Dominican California	62
Concordia Nebraska	73
Virginia Intermont	79
2	Cardinal Stritch	94

Second round
1	Northwestern (IA)	89*
16	William Jewell	86
9	Huntington (IN)	80
8	Cedarville	70
5	Saint Vincent	54
12	Cornerstone	92
13	Cascade	68
4	Bellevue (NE)	76
3	Jamestown	74
Albertson	65
11	Warner Southern	99
College of the Ozarks	93
Bethany (KS)	89
10	Oregon Tech	83
Concordia Nebraska	68
2	Cardinal Stritch	54

Quarterfinals
1	Northwestern (IA)	74
9	Huntington (IN)	60
12	Cornerstone	84
4	Bellevue (NE)	75
3	Jamestown	71
11	Warner Southern	76
Bethany (KS)	77*
Concordia Nebraska	72

Semifinals
1	Northwestern (IA)	104
12	Cornerstone	92
11	Warner Southern	69
Bethany (KS)	74

National championship
1	Northwestern (IA)	77
Bethany (KS)	57

== See also ==
- 2003 NAIA Division I men's basketball tournament
- 2003 NCAA Division I men's basketball tournament
- 2003 NCAA Division II men's basketball tournament
- 2003 NCAA Division III men's basketball tournament
- 2003 NAIA Division II women's basketball tournament
