= 1998 NAIA Division I men's basketball tournament =

College basketball tournament

- Teams: 32
- Finals site: Mabee Center; Tulsa, Oklahoma
- Champions: Georgetown (KY) (1 title, 3 title game, 7 Fab Four)
- Runner-up: Southern Nazarene (1 title game, 1 Fab Four)
- Semifinalists: Azusa Pacific (1 Final Four); Park (1 Final Four)
- Charles Stevenson Hustle Award: David Shee (Georgetown)
- Chuck Taylor MVP: Will Carlton (Georgetown)

The 1998 NAIA Men's Division I Basketball Tournament was held in March at Mabee Center in Tulsa, Oklahoma, and the last time for now NAIA Tournament at Mabee Center. The 61st annual NAIA basketball tournament featured 32 teams playing in a single-elimination format.

== Awards and honors ==
- Leading scorers:
- Leading rebounder:
- Player of the Year: Daniel Santiago (St. Vincent).

== 1998 NAIA bracket ==
First round	Second round
1	Azusa Pacific	104
-	Huston–Tillotson	44
1	Azusa Pacific	72
-	Transylvania	64
-	Transylvania	63
16	Mobile	60
TOP TIER
9	Incarnate Word	68
-	Lindsey Wilson	48
9	Incarnate Word	63
8	Oklahoma City	52
8	Oklahoma City	84
-	The Master’s	73
-	Central Washington	73
5	Union (TN)	64
-	Central Washington	80
-	Olivet Nazarene	74
-	Olivet Nazarene	76
12	BYU–Hawaii	66
TOP TIER
-	Montana State–Northern	83
13	Houston Baptist	67
-	Montana State Northern	65
4	Georgetown (KY)	78
4	Georgetown (KY)	'80
-	Hannibal–LaGrange	68
3	Life	74
-	Cumberlands	61
3	Life	90*
14	Southern Nazarene	94
14	Southern Nazarene	67
-	Freed–Hardeman	60
BOTTOM TIER
11	Biola	61
-	Montana Tech	54
11	Biola	84
-	East Central	90
-	East Central (OK)	86
6	Hawaii Pacific	85
-	Benedict	85
7	Birmingham–Southern	81
-	Benedict	81*
10	St. Vincent	84
10	Saint Vincent	78
-	Georgia Southwestern State	58
BOTTOM TIER
15	Park	72
-	St. Mary's (TX)	58
15	Park	69
2	Phillips	66
2	Phillips	86
-	Southern–New Orleans	78

Elite Eight
1	Azusa Pacific	66
9	Incarnate Word	62
-	Central Washington	79
4	Georgetown (KY)	92
14	Southern Nazarene	88
-	East Central	86
10	St. Vincent	59
15	Park	73

NAIA national semifinals
1	Azusa Pacific	76
4	Georgetown (KY)	94
14	Southern Nazarene	67
15	Park	56

NAIA national championship
4	Georgetown (KY)	83
14	Southern Nazarene	69

- * denotes overtime.

== See also ==
- 1998 NCAA Division I men's basketball tournament
- 1998 NCAA Division II men's basketball tournament
- 1998 NCAA Division III men's basketball tournament
- 1998 NAIA Division II men's basketball tournament
- 1998 NAIA Division I women's basketball tournament
