= CIAA women's basketball tournament =

Central Intercollegiate Athletic Association women's basketball tournament
- Conference basketball championship
- Sport: Basketball
- Conference: Central Intercollegiate Athletic Association
- Format: Single-elimination tournament
- Played: 1975–present
- Current champion: Winston-Salem State (1st)
- Most championships: Shaw (11)
- Official website: CIAA women's basketball

The Central Intercollegiate Athletic Association women's basketball tournament is the annual conference women's basketball championship tournament for the Central Intercollegiate Athletic Association. The tournament has been held annually since 1975. It is a single-elimination tournament and seeding is based on regular season records.

The winner receives the CIAA's automatic bid to the NCAA Division II women's basketball tournament.

Shaw have been the most successful team at the CIAA tournament, with eleven championships.

== Results ==
| Year | Champions |
|---|---|
| 1975 | Norfolk State (1) |
| 1976 | Shaw (1) |
| 1977 | Norfolk State (2) |
| 1978 | St. Augustine's (1) |
| 1979 | Fayetteville State (1) |
| 1980 | Virginia State (1) |
| 1981 | Virginia State (2) |
| 1982 | Virginia Union (1) |
| 1983 | Norfolk State (3) |
| 1984 | North Carolina Central (1) |
| 1985 | Hampton (1) |
| 1986 | Norfolk State (4) |
| 1987 | Hampton (2) |
| 1988 | Virginia State (3) |
| 1989 | Shaw (2) |
| 1990 | Virginia State (4) |
| 1991 | Norfolk State (5) |
| 1992 | Norfolk State (6) |
| 1993 | Norfolk State (7) |
| 1994 | Hampton (3) |
| 1995 | Norfolk State (8) |
| 1996 | Norfolk State (9) |
| 1997 | Bowie State (1) |
| 1998 | Bowie State (2) |
| 1999 | Bowie State (3) |
| 2000 | Livingstone (1) |
| 2001 | Fayetteville State (2) |
| 2002 | Virginia State (5) |
| 2003 | Shaw (3) |
| 2004 | Shaw (4) |
| 2005 | Shaw (5) |
| 2006 | Shaw (6) |
| 2007 | North Carolina Central (2) |
| 2008 | Shaw (7) |
| 2009 | Johnson C. Smith (1) |
| 2010 | Fayetteville State (3) |
| 2011 | Shaw (8) |
| 2012 | Shaw (9) |
| 2013 | Shaw (10) |
| 2014 | Shaw (11) |
| 2015 | Virginia State (6) |
| 2016 | Virginia Union (2) |
| 2017 | Johnson C. Smith (2) |
| 2018 | Virginia Union (3) |
| 2019 | Virginia Union (4) |
| 2020 | Fayetteville State (4) |
| 2021 | Cancelled due to the COVID-19 pandemic |
| 2022 | Lincoln (PA) (1) |
| 2023 | Elizabeth City State (1) |
| 2024 | Fayetteville State (5) |
| 2025 | Fayetteville State (6) |
| 2026 | Winston-Salem State (1) |

== Championship records ==
| School | Titles | Years |
|---|---|---|
| Shaw | 11 | 1976, 1989, 2003, 2004, 2005, 2006, 2008, 2011, 2012, 2013, 2014 |
| Norfolk State | 9 | 1975, 1977, 1983, 1986, 1991, 1992, 1993, 1995, 1996 |
| Fayetteville State | 6 | 1979, 2001, 2010, 2020, 2024, 2025 |
| Virginia State | 6 | 1980, 1981, 1988, 1990, 2002, 2015 |
| Virginia Union | 4 | 1982, 2016, 2018, 2019 |
| Bowie State | 3 | 1997, 1998, 1999 |
| Hampton | 3 | 1985, 1987, 1994 |
| North Carolina Central | 2 | 1984, 2007 |
| Johnson C. Smith | 2 | 2009, 2017 |
| Winston-Salem State | 1 | 2026 |
| Elizabeth City State | 1 | 2023 |
| Lincoln (PA) | 1 | 2022 |
| Livingstone | 1 | 2000 |
| St. Augustine's | 1 | 1978 |

- Bluefield State and Claflin have not yet won the CIAA tournament
- Chowan and Saint Paul's never won the tournament as CIAA members
- Schools highlighted in pink are former members of the CIAA

== See also ==
- MEAC women's basketball tournament
