= 2003 NCAA Division III men's basketball tournament =

American collegiate men's basketball tournament (2003)

- Teams: 48
- Finals site: , Salem, Virginia
- Champions: Williams (1st title)
- Runner-up: Gustavus Adolphus (1st title game)
- Semifinalists: Wooster (1st Final Four); Hampden-Sydney (2nd Final Four)
- Winning coach: Dave Paulsen (Williams)
- MOP: Benjamin Coffin (Williams)
- Attendance: 50,870

The 2003 NCAA Division III men's basketball tournament was the 29th annual single-elimination tournament to determine the national champions of National Collegiate Athletic Association (NCAA) men's Division III collegiate basketball in the United States.

The field contained forty-eight teams, and each program was allocated to one of four sectionals. All sectional games were played on campus sites, while the national semifinals, third-place final, and championship finals were contested at the Salem Civic Center in Salem, Virginia.

Williams defeated Gustavus Adolphus, 67–65, in the championship, clinching their first national title.

The Ephs (31–1) were coached by Dave Paulsen. Paulsen would later coach at Division I programs Bucknell and George Mason.

Benjamin Coffin, also from Williams, was named Most Outstanding Player.

== Bracket ==
=== Top left sectional ===
First round
Alvernia	58
Mary Washington	53
UW–Oshkosh	78
MSOE	56
Christopher Newport	61
SCAD	66
Illinois Wesleyan	79
Blackburn	59

Second round
Randolph–Macon	72*
Alvernia	69
UW–Oshkosh	84
Hope	77
Hampden–Sydney	56
SCAD	54
Illinois Wesleyan	85
Washington–St. Louis	73

Sectional semifinals
Randolph–Macon	47
UW–Oshkosh	53
Hampden–Sydney	76
Illinois Wesleyan	68

Sectional finals
UW–Oshkosh	63
Hampden–Sydney	68

=== Bottom left sectional ===
First round
Buena Vista	96
Illinois College	66
Trinity (TX)	66
Aurora	67
Gustavus Adolphus	65
Whitworth	55
Maryville (TN)	70
Mississippi College	58

Second round
Rockford	72
Buena Vista	84
Aurora	61
Occidental	80
UW–Stevens Point	62
Gustavus Adolphus	75
Maryville (TN)	64
Hanover	68

Sectional semifinals
Buena Vista	62
Occidental	67
Gustavus Adolphus	79
Hanover	66

Sectional finals
Occidental	56
Gustavus Adolphus	74

=== Top right sectional ===
First round
Salem State	81
St. Joseph's (ME)	76
Hamilton	93
Colby–Sawyer	68
Southern Vermont	63
Lasell	60
Clark (MA)	82
Western Connecticut	84

Second round
Williams	94
Salem State	67
Hamilton	72
St. John Fisher	68
Amherst	84
Southern Vermont	60
Western Connecticut	62
Rochester	73

Sectional semifinals
Williams	76
Hamilton	65
Amherst	74
Rochester	68

Sectional finals
Williams	91
Amherst	74

=== Bottom right sectional ===
First round
Scranton	58
Buffalo State	56
John Carroll	85
Pitt–Bradford	65
Kings Point	63
CCNY	57
Montclair State	74
Elizabethtown	69

Second round
Ursinus	75
Scranton	77
John Carroll	75
Wooster	77
Ramapo	92
Kings Point	76
Montclair State	95
Catholic	78

Sectional semifinals
Scranton	64
Wooster	75
Ramapo	89
Montclair State	80

Sectional finals
Wooster	68
Ramapo	64

=== National finals ===
- Site: Salem Civic Center, Salem, Virginia

National semifinals
Hampden–Sydney	68
Gustavus Adolphus	79
Williams	74
Wooster	72**

National championship
Gustavus Adolphus	65
Williams	67
National third-place
Hampden–Sydney	74
Wooster	78

== See also ==
- 2003 NCAA Division I men's basketball tournament
- 2003 NCAA Division II men's basketball tournament
- 2003 NCAA Division III women's basketball tournament
- 2003 NAIA Division I men's basketball tournament
- 2003 NAIA Division II men's basketball tournament
