= 2003 NCAA Division III women's basketball tournament =

- Teams: 64
- Finals site: Hulbert Arena, Terre Haute, Indiana
- Champions: Trinity Tigers (1st title)
- Runner-up: Eastern Connecticut State Warriors (1st title game)
- Third place: Wisconsin–Eau Claire Blugolds (3rd Final Four)
- Fourth place: Rochester Yellowjackets (1st Final Four)
- Winning coach: Becky Geyer (1st title)
- MOP: Allison Wooley (Trinity (TX))
- Attendance: 37,313

The 2003 NCAA Division III women's basketball tournament was the 22nd annual tournament hosted by the NCAA to determine the national champion of Division III women's collegiate basketball in the United States.

Trinity (TX) defeated Eastern Connecticut State in the championship game, 60–58, to win the Tigers' first Division III national title.

The championship rounds were played at the Hulbert Arena in Terre Haute, Indiana from March 21–22, hosted by Rose–Hulman Institute of Technology.

== Bracket ==
=== Top left sectional ===
First round March 5, 2003; Campus sites
Gwynedd Mercy*	48
Rutgers Camden	63
Johns Hopkins*	75
Hunter	50
Messiah*	84
Hood	46
Scranton*	66
St. Lawrence	61
Ithaca*	81
Brockport State	68

Second round March 8, 2023; Campus sites
Marymount (VA)*	83
Rutgers–Camden	80
Johns Hopkins	60
Messiah*	86
Rochester (NY)*	59
Scranton	45
Ithaca	86*
St. John Fisher*	79

Sectional semifinals March 14–15, 2003; Rochester, NY
Marymount (VA)	82
Messiah	83
Rochester*	57
Ithaca	51

Sectional finals March 14–15, 2003; Rochester, NY
Messiah	60
Rochester	71

=== Bottom left sectional ===
First round March 5, 2003; Campus sites
Randolph-Macon*	77
Meredith	74
Maryville (TN)*	50
Methodist	49
Fontbonne*	54
Illinois Wesleyan	67
St. Norbert*	65
Rockford	47

Second round March 8, 2023; Campus sites
Hardin-Simmons*	104
Randolph-Macon	80
Maryville (TN)	60
Trinity (TX)*	66
Washington St. Louis*	80
Illinois Wesleyan	56
St. Norbert	60
Carleton*	47

Sectional semifinals March 14–15, 2003; Abilene, TX
Hardin-Simmons	61
Trinity (TX)	67
Washington St. Louis	83
St. Norbert	65

Sectional finals March 14–15, 2003; Abilene, TX
Trinity (TX)	76
Washington St. Louis	57

=== Top right sectional ===
First round March 5, 2003; Campus sites
Emmanuel (MA)*	69
Salve Regina	52
Salem State*	61
Springfield	50
Mount Saint Mary*	54
Pitt Greensburg	62
Eastern Connecticut*	91
Farmingdale State	49

Second round March 8, 2023; Campus sites
Bowdoin*	73
Emmanuel (MA)	50
Salem State	54
Southern Maine*	72
King's (PA)	82
Pitt Greensburg	67
Eastern Connecticut	65
DeSales*	51

Sectional semifinals March 14–15, 2003; Scranton, PA
Bowdoin	64
Southern Maine	47
King's (PA)	57
Eastern Connecticut	67

Sectional finals March 14–15, 2003; Scranton, PA
Bowdoin	47
Eastern Connecticut	58

=== Bottom right sectional ===
First round March 5, 2003; Campus sites
UW Eau Claire*	70
Wisconsin Lutheran	49
Chapman*	70
La Verne	46
Gustavus Adolphus*	67
Loras	59
Baldwin-Wallace*	64
Wittenberg	57
Hope*	75
Mount St. Joseph	63

Second round March 8, 2023; Campus sites
UW Eau Claire*	81
Chapman	45
Gustavus Adolphus	54
Pacific Lutheran*	58
Wilmington (OH)*	74
Baldwin-Wallace	63
Hope	71
Washington & Jefferson*	60

Sectional semifinals March 14–15, 2003; Eau Claire, WI
UW Eau Claire	43
Pacific Lutheran	41
Wilmington (OH)	73
Hope	77

Sectional finals March 14–15, 2003; Eau Claire, WI
UW Eau Claire	74
Hope	56

=== Final Four ===
Final Four; March 21, 2003
Rochester (NY)	54
Trinity (TX)	63
Eastern Connecticut	52*
UW Eau Claire	49

National championship March 22, 2003
Trinity (TX)	60
Eastern Connecticut	58
Third place March 22, 2003
Rochester (NY)	77
UW Eau Claire	82**

== All-tournament team ==
- Allison Wooley, Trinity (TX)
- Megan Selmon, Trinity (TX)
- Allison Coleman, Eastern Connecticut State
- Kristi Channing, Wisconsin–Eau Claire
- Kelly Wescott, Rochester (NY)

== See also ==
- 2003 NCAA Division I women's basketball tournament
- 2003 NCAA Division II women's basketball tournament
- 2003 NAIA Division I women's basketball tournament
- 2003 NAIA Division II women's basketball tournament
- 2003 NCAA Division III men's basketball tournament
