= 1998 NAIA Division II men's basketball tournament =

- Teams: 32
- Finals site: Idaho Center; Nampa, Idaho
- Champions: Bethel Pilots (3rd title, 3rd title game, 3rd Fab Four)
- Runner-up: Oregon Tech Owls (1st title game, 1st Fab Four)
- Semifinalists: Mount Marty Lancers (1st Fab Four); Northwest Nazarene Crusaders (4th Fab Four)
- Charles Stevenson Hustle Award: Brent Darnel (Northwest Nazarene)
- Chuck Taylor MVP: Rico Swanson (Bethel (IN))
- Top scorer: Mac Rops (Mount Marty) (92 points)

The 1998 NAIA Division II men's basketball tournament was the tournament held by the NAIA to determine the national champion of men's college basketball among its Division II members in the United States and Canada for the 1997–98 basketball season.

Top-seeded defending champions Bethel (IN) defeated Oregon Tech in the championship game, 89–87, to claim the Pilots' third NAIA national title.

The tournament was played at the Idaho Center at Northwest Nazarene University in Nampa, Idaho.

== Qualification ==
The tournament field remained fixed at thirty-two teams, and the top sixteen teams were seeded.

The tournament continued to utilize a single-elimination format.

== Bracket ==
First round
1	Bethel (IN)	100
Southwestern (KS)	84
Caldwell	77
16	Briar Cliff	83
9	Cardinal Stritch	103
Central Methodist	94
Berea	78
8	Whitworth	82
5	Mount Vernon Nazarene	86
Saint Ambrose	83
Virginia Intermont	75
12	Western Baptist	90
13	Mount Marty	87
Embry–Riddle (FL)	75
Castleton State	67
4	Siena Heights	89
3	Mayville State	99
Bellevue	72
Black Hills State	68
14	Marian	59
11	Northwest Nazarene	86
Indiana Tech	73
King (TN)	65
6	Warner Southern	76
7	Concordia Nebraska	54
Holy Names	65
Saint Joseph's (ME)	82
10	Lewis & Clark	84
15	Oregon Tech	81
Walsh	73
Mary Hardin–Baylor	68
2	William Jewell	93

Second round
1	Bethel (IN)	107
16	Briar Cliff	100
9	Cardinal Stritch	72
8	Whitworth	75
5	Mount Vernon Nazarene	80
12	Western Baptist	75
13	Mount Marty	73
4	Siena Heights	72
3	Mayville State	68
Black Hills State	59
11	Northwest Nazarene	96
6	Warner Southern	84
Holy Names	76
10	Lewis & Clark	87
15	Oregon Tech	90
2	William Jewell	76

Quarterfinals
1	Bethel (IN)	88
8	Whitworth	85
5	Mount Vernon Nazarene	69
13	Mount Marty	74
3	Mayville State	75
11	Northwest Nazarene	84
10	Lewis & Clark	89
15	Oregon Tech	100

Semifinals
1	Bethel (IN)	88
13	Mount Marty	86
11	Northwest Nazarene	75
15	Oregon Tech	82

National championship
1	Bethel (IN)	89
15	Oregon Tech	87

== See also ==
- 1998 NAIA Division I men's basketball tournament
- 1998 NCAA Division I men's basketball tournament
- 1998 NCAA Division II men's basketball tournament
- 1998 NCAA Division III men's basketball tournament
- 1998 NAIA Division II women's basketball tournament
