= Sawyer Center =

Main athletic facility for Southern Nazarene University

- Interactive map of Sawyer Center
- Location: Southern Nazarene University, Bethany, OK 73008
- Coordinates: 35.511981°N 97.62594°W
- Owner: Southern Nazarene University
- Capacity: 5,000

Construction
- Opened: February 11, 1999

Tenant
- Southern Nazarene Crimson Storm

The Sawyer Center, named for Carl Brannon Sawyer, is the main athletic facility for Southern Nazarene University (SNU) and seats over 5,000. It is used for basketball and volleyball games played by the Southern Nazarene Crimson Storm. In addition to sporting events, the Sawyer Center also hosts all commencement, the New Student Institute for welcome week activities, and high school tournaments.

== History ==
The first event held in the Sawyer Center was SNU's annual Excel Auction on February 11, 1998. The first sporting event was one week later, when the men's and women's basketball teams took on their cross-town rivals from Oklahoma City University. The Crimson Storm defeated both teams.

From 2001 to 2008, the Sawyer Center was home to the championship games of the National Christian Homeschool Basketball Championships. Every year the event was held there, the Sawyer Center held capacity crowds. In the last 2 years of the tournament, people were being turned away because of firecodes.

Due to the catastrophic devastation brought by Hurricane Katrina, the New Orleans Hornets franchise temporarily relocated their base of operations to Oklahoma City for two seasons in 2005–06 and 2006–07. During this time, the franchise was known as the New Orleans/Oklahoma City Hornets. In these two seasons, the vast majority of home games were played at the Ford Center in Oklahoma City, while a few remained at New Orleans Arena. During the New Orleans Hornets temporary relocation to Oklahoma City, the Sawyer Center was the official practice facility for the Oklahoma City/New Orleans Hornets.

The Sawyer Center will also serve as the temporary practice facility for the new Oklahoma City Thunder basketball team, until a permanent facility is built.
