= 2003 NAIA Division I men's basketball tournament =

College basketball tournament

- Teams: 32
- Finals site: Municipal Auditorium; Kansas City, Missouri
- Champions: Concordia (CA) (1st title)
- Runner-up: Mountain State (1st title game)
- Semifinalists: Georgetown (KY) (9th Fab Four); McKendree (1st Fab Four)
- Coach of the year: Ken Ammann (Concordia (CA))
- Player of the year: Matt Laur (McKendree)
- Charles Stevenson Hustle Award: Tanner Luster (Concordia (CA))
- Chuck Taylor MVP: Raynardo Curry (Mountain State)
- Attendance: 21,234
- Top scorer: Matt Laur (McKendree) (116 points)

The 2003 Buffalo Funds - NAIA Men's Division I Basketball Tournament was held from March at Municipal Auditorium in Kansas City, Missouri. The 66th annual NAIA basketball tournament featured 32 teams playing in a single-elimination format. The 2003 National Championship game would feature Concordia (CA) and Mountain State. That game would be the 6th championship game to go into overtime (the most recent as of 2009). The Eagles would defeat the Cougars by an overtime score of 88 to 84. The other teams making it to the NAIA national semifinals were Georgetown (KY), and McKendree.

== Awards and honors ==
- Leading scorer: Matt Laur, McKendree; in 4 games Laur scored a total of 116 points. Including 48 field goals and 20 free throws. Laur averaged 29.0 points per game.
- Leading rebounder: Matt Laur, McKendree; in 4 games Laur earned 49 rebounds averaging 12.3 per game.
- Most Three-point Field Goals Made (Individual/Tournament): 21 by Jeremy Groth of Concordia (CA)
- Most consecutive tournament appearances: 12th, Georgetown (KY)
- Most tournament appearances: Georgetown (KY), 22nd of 28, appearances to the NAIA Tournament.

== 2003 NAIA bracket ==
First round	Second round
1	Houston Baptist	76
–	Dillard	79
–	Dillard	79
16	Lee	105
–	Carroll (MT)	58
16	Lee	68
TOP TIER
9	St. Xavier	82
–	Oklahoma City	56
9	St. Xavier	60
8	Georgetown (KY)	77
–	Point Loma Nazarene	63
8	Georgetown (KY)	86
5	Oklahoma Baptist	69
–	Lindsey Wilson	66
5	Oklahoma Baptist	72
12	Westmont	66
–	Auburn Montgomery	53
12	Westmont	85
TOP TIER
13	Columbia (MO)	68
–	Wayland Baptist	72
–	Wayland Baptist	85
4	Mountain State	94
–	Rocky Mountain	80
4	Mountain State	88
3	Southern–New Orleans	85
–	Reinhardt	72
3	Southern–New Orleans	69
14	Barber–Scotia	72
–	Westminster (UT)	48
14	Barber–Scotia	59
BOTTOM TIER
11	Cumberland (KY)	73
–	Oklahoma Christian	86
–	Oklahoma Christian	73
6	Concordia (CA)	76
–	Martin Methodist	64
6	Concordia (CA)	87
7	Azusa Pacific	67
–	John Brown	70
–	John Brown	78
-	Olivet Nazarene	83
–	Olivet Nazarene	63
10	Faulkner	58
BOTTOM TIER
15	USAO	79
–	Pikeville	68
15	USAO	98
2	McKendree	105
–	Jarvis Christian	81
2	McKendree	94

Elite Eight
16	Lee	58
8	Georgetown (KY)	71
5	Oklahoma Baptist	106*
4	Mountain State	108
14	Barber–Scotia	52
6	Concordia (CA)	64
–	Olivet Nazarene	62
2	McKendree	64

NAIA national semifinals
8	Georgetown (KY)	89
4	Mountain State	106
6	Concordia	81
2	McKendree	58

NAIA national championship
4	Mountain State	84*
6	Concordia	88

- * denotes overtime.

== See also ==
- 2003 NAIA Division I women's basketball tournament
- 2003 NCAA Division I men's basketball tournament
- 2003 NCAA Division II men's basketball tournament
- 2003 NCAA Division III men's basketball tournament
- 2003 NAIA Division II men's basketball tournament
