= 1998 NCAA Division III women's basketball tournament =

- Teams: 48
- Finals site: , Gorham, Maine
- Champions: Washington University Bears (1st title)
- Runner-up: Southern Maine Huskies (1st title game)
- Third place: Mount Union Purple Raiders (2nd Final Four)
- Fourth place: Rowan Profs (1st Final Four)
- Winning coach: Nancy Fahey (1st title)
- MOP: Amy Schweizer (Washington University in St. Louis)
- Attendance: 27,762

The 1998 NCAA Division III women's basketball tournament was the 17th annual tournament hosted by the NCAA to determine the national champion of Division III women's collegiate basketball in the United States.

Washington University in St. Louis defeated Southern Maine in the championship game, 66–50, to claim the Bears' first Division III national title, their first of four consecutive.

The championship rounds were hosted by the University of Southern Maine in Gorham, Maine.

== Bracket ==
- An asterisk by a team indicates the host of first and second round games
- An asterisk by a score indicates an overtime period

=== Northeast sectional ===
First round March 4, 1998; Campus sites
Mid-Atlantic Region
Allentown* | 45
Muhlenberg | 53
Salem State* | 89
Clark (MA) | 76
Northeast Region
Mid-Atlantic Region
Alvernia* | 83
Washington & Jefferson | 65
Western Connecticut* | 67
Middlebury | 45
Northeast Region

Second round March 7, 1998; Campus sites
Johns Hopkins* | 68
Muhlenberg | 44
Salem State | 67
Bates* | 71
Scranton* | 68
Alvernia | 52
Western Connecticut | 62
Southern Maine* | 79

Sectional semifinals March 13, 1998; Gorham, ME
Johns Hopkins | 69
Bates | 56
Scranton | 72
Southern Maine | 76

Sectional finals March 14, 1998; Gorham, ME
Johns Hopkins | 72
Southern Maine | 81

=== West sectional ===
First round March 4, 1998; Campus sites
Great Lakes Region
Calvin* | 56
Wittenberg | 47
UC San Diego* | 62
Cal Lutheran | 56
West Region
Great Lakes Region
Baldwin Wallace* | 75
Hope | 71
Luther* | 51
Central (IA) | 65
West Region

Second round March 7, 1998; Campus sites
Mount Union* | 57
Calvin | 56
UC San Diego | 47
St. Benedict* | 73
DePauw* | 70
Baldwin-Wallace | 63
Central (IA) | 56
St. Thomas (MN)* | 85

Sectional semifinals March 13, 1998; St. Paul, MN
Mount Union | 79
St. Benedict | 74
DePauw | 61
St. Thomas (MN) | 80

Sectional finals March 14, 1998; St. Paul, MN
Mount Union | 67
St. Thomas (MN) | 63

=== Atlantic sectional ===
First round March 4, 1998; Campus sites
East Region
Oneonta* | 58
Elmira | 62
TCNJ* | 63
Colby–Sawyer | 35
Atlantic Region
East Region
William Smith* | 76
Nazareth | 52
St. Mary's (MD)* | 43
Mary Washington | 56
Atlantic Region

Second round March 7, 1998; Campus sites
Binghamton* | 73
Elmira | 82
TCNJ | 57
William Paterson* | 69
NYU* | 70
William Smith | 54
Mary Washington | 60
Rowan* | 95

Sectional semifinals March 13, 1998; Glassboro, NJ
Elmira | 48
William Paterson | 60
NYU | 52
Rowan | 57

Sectional finals March 14, 1998; Glassboro, NJ
William Paterson | 43
Rowan | 66

=== South sectional ===
First round March 4, 1998; Campus sites
Central Region
Wisconsin–Eau Claire* | 86**
Beloit | 81
Austin* | 69
Southwestern (TX) | 51
South Region
Central Region
Millikin* | 68
Wheaton (IL) | 58
Christopher Newport* | 77
Roanoke | 57
South Region

Second round March 7, 1998; Campus sites
Wisconsin–Oshkosh* | 65
Wisconsin–Eau Claire | 49
Austin | 64
Randolph-Macon | 52
Washington St. Louis* | 66
Millikin | 54
Christopher Newport | 87
Bridgewater (VA)* | 90

Sectional semifinals March 13, 1998; Bridgewater, VA
Wisconsin–Oshkosh | 57
Austin | 44
Washington St. Louis | 82
Bridgewater (VA) | 36

Sectional finals March 14, 1998; Bridgewater, VA
Wisconsin–Oshkosh | 45
Washington St. Louis | 53

=== Final Four ===
Final Four; March 20, 1998; Gorham, ME
Southern Maine | 79
Mount Union | 66
Rowan | 51
Washington St. Louis | 66

National championship March 21, 1998; Gorham, ME
Southern Maine | 69
Washington St. Louis | 77
Third place
Mount Union | 68
Rowan | 64

== All-tournament team ==
- Amy Schweizer, Washington University in St. Louis
- Alia Fischer, Washington University in St. Louis
- Joanna Brown, Southern Maine
- Julie Plant, Southern Maine
- Suzy Venet, Mount Union

== See also ==
- 1998 NCAA Division III men's basketball tournament
- 1998 NCAA Division I women's basketball tournament
- 1998 NCAA Division II women's basketball tournament
- 1998 NAIA Division I women's basketball tournament
- 1998 NAIA Division II women's basketball tournament
