= 1998 NCAA Division II men's basketball tournament =

- Teams: 48
- Finals site: Commonwealth Convention Center, Louisville, Kentucky
- Champions: UC Davis (1st title)
- Runner-up: Kentucky Wesleyan (8th title game)
- Semifinalists: Saint Rose (1st Final Four); Virginia Union (5th Final Four)
- Winning coach: Bob Williams (1st title)
- MOP: Antonio Garcia (Kentucky Wesleyan)

The 1998 NCAA Division II men's basketball tournament was the 42nd annual single-elimination tournament to determine the national champion of men's NCAA Division II college basketball in the United States.

The official culmination of the 1997–98 NCAA Division II men's basketball season, the tournament featured forty-eight teams from around the country.

The Elite Eight, national semifinals, and championship were played at the Commonwealth Convention Center in Louisville, Kentucky.

UC Davis (31–2) defeated Kentucky Wesleyan in the final, 83–77, to win their first Division II national championship.

The Aggies were coached by Bob Williams. Kentucky Wesleyan's Antonio Garcia, meanwhile, was the Most Outstanding Player.

1998 NCAA Division II Men's sites - regionals (cyan) Elite Eight (red)

== Regionals ==
=== South Atlantic - Spartanburg, South Carolina ===
Location: Hodge Center Host: University of South Carolina-Spartanburg

First round Round of 48; March 5
4	South Carolina-Spartanburg	95
5	Johnson C. Smith	67
3	Columbus State	65
6	South Carolina-Aiken	74

Regional semifinals Round of 32; March 6
1	Virginia Union	91
4	South Carolina-Spartanburg	61
2	Catawba	82
6	South Carolina-Aiken	76

Regional final Sweet 16; March 7
1	Virginia Union	70
2	Catawba	58

=== North Central - Brookings, South Dakota ===
Location: Frost Arena Host: South Dakota State University

First round Round of 48; March 6
4	Metro State	69
5	Fort Hays State	61
3	Nebraska–Kearney	77
6	Southern Colorado	74

Regional semifinals Round of 32; March 7
1	South Dakota State	93
4	Metro State	79
2	Northern State	92
3	Nebraska–Kearney	86

Regional final Sweet 16; March 8
1	South Dakota State	82
2	Northern State	88

=== South - Cleveland, Mississippi ===
Location: Walter Sillers Coliseum Host: Delta State University

First round Round of 48; March 5
4	Florida Southern	80
5	Albany State	86
3	West Georgia	77
6	Fort Valley State	74

Regional semifinals Round of 32; March 6
1	Delta State	84
5	Albany State	62
2	Lynn	104
3	West Georgia	92

Regional final Sweet 16; March 7
1	Delta State	63
2	Lynn	59

=== Great Lakes - Owensboro, Kentucky ===
Location: Sportscenter Host: Kentucky Wesleyan College

First round Round of 48; March 5
4	Michigan Tech	76
5	Lewis	73
3	Northern Kentucky	78
6	Ferris State	63

Regional semifinals Round of 32; March 6
1	Kentucky Wesleyan	78
4	Michigan Tech	68
2	Southern Indiana	81
3	Northern Kentucky	66

Regional final Sweet 16; March 7
1	Kentucky Wesleyan	98
2	Southern Indiana	79

=== Northeast - Albany, New York ===
Location: Events and Athletics Center Host: College of Saint Rose

First round Round of 48; March 6
4	Assumption	87
5	Adelphi	63
3	Dowling	62
6	New Hampshire College	89

Regional semifinals Round of 32; March 7
1	Saint Rose	87
4	Assumption	80
2	Stonehill (OT)	78
6	New Hampshire College	67

Regional final Sweet 16; March 8
1	Saint Rose	97
2	Stonehill	87

=== East - Salem, West Virginia ===
Location: T. Edward Davis Gymnasium Host: Salem-Teikyo University

First round Round of 48; March 5
4	California (PA)	78
5	Edinboro	79
3	Queens (NC)	72
6	Pittsburgh-Johnstown	80

Regional semifinals Round of 32; March 6
1	Salem-Teikyo	91
5	Edinboro	83
2	Fairmont State	75
6	Pittsburgh-Johnstown	74

Regional final Sweet 16; March 7
1	Salem-Teikyo	78
2	Fairmont State	79

=== South Central - Canyon, Texas ===
Location: West Texas Fieldhouse Host: West Texas A&M University

First round Round of 48; March 5
4	Northwest Missouri State	70
5	Pittsburg State	85
3	Central Oklahoma	107
6	Texas A&M–Commerce	103

Regional semifinals Round of 32; March 6
1	West Texas A&M	90
5	Pittsburg State	79
2	Missouri Western	101
3	Central Oklahoma	109

Regional final Sweet 16; March 7
1	West Texas A&M	105
3	Central Oklahoma	101

=== West - Davis, California ===
Location: The Pavilion Host: University of California, Davis

First round Round of 48; March 5
4	Cal State Los Angeles	58
5	Grand Canyon	53
3	Montana State-Billings	64
6	Seattle Pacific	82

Regional semifinals Round of 32; March 6
1	Cal Davis	53
4	Cal State Los Angeles	51
2	Cal State Bakersfield	60
6	Seattle Pacific	62

Regional final Sweet 16; March 7
1	Cal Davis	80
6	Seattle Pacific	52

== Elite Eight - Louisville, Kentucky ==
Location: Commonwealth Convention Center Host: Bellarmine College

National Quarterfinals; Elite Eight; March 18
W	UC Davis	63
SC	West Texas A&M	55
Louisville, Kentucky
NE	Saint Rose	77*
E	Fairmont State	73
SA	Virginia Union	67
NC	Northern State	63
GL	Kentucky Wesleyan	76
S	Delta State	68

National semifinals Final Four; March 19
W	UC Davis	88
NE	Saint Rose	76
SA	Virginia Union	72
GL	Kentucky Wesleyan	80

National championship March 21
W	UC Davis	83
GL	Kentucky Wesleyan	77

== All-tournament team ==
- Antonio Garcia, Kentucky Wesleyan (MOP)
- Dana Williams, Kentucky Wesleyan
- Jason Cox, UC Davis
- Dante Ross, UC Davis
- William Davis, Virginia Union

== See also ==
- 1998 NCAA Division II women's basketball tournament
- 1998 NCAA Division I men's basketball tournament
- 1998 NCAA Division III men's basketball tournament
- 1998 NAIA Division I men's basketball tournament
- 1998 NAIA Division II men's basketball tournament
