= Marieme Lo =

Senegalese basketball player

Senegal women's national basketball team
- Position: forward

Personal information
- Born: 10 September 1972 (age 53) Dakar, Senegal
- Listed height: 183 cm (72 in)

Career information
- College: Central State University

Marieme Lo (born 10 September 1972) is a Senegalese former basketball player who competed in the 2000 Summer Olympics. She was born in Dakar. In 2016, she was named to the Ohio Basketball Hall of Fame.

== Early life and education ==
Marieme Lo was born on 10 September 1972 in Dakar, Senegal. Lo graduated from Central State University (Wilberforce, Ohio, United States) where she majored in computer information systems.
