= 1998 NCAA Division III men's basketball tournament =

American collegiate men's basketball tournament (1998)

- Teams: 48
- Finals site: , Salem, Virginia
- Champions: Wisconsin–Platteville (3rd title)
- Runner-up: Hope (2nd title game)
- Semifinalists: Williams (2nd Final Four); Wilkes (1st Final Four)
- Winning coach: Bo Ryan (UWP)
- MOP: Ben Hoffmann (UWP)
- Attendance: 59,784

The 1998 NCAA Division III men's basketball tournament was the 24th annual single-elimination tournament to determine the national champions of National Collegiate Athletic Association (NCAA) men's Division III collegiate basketball in the United States.

The field contained forty-eight teams, a decrease of sixteen teams from the 1997 tournament. Each of these forty-eight programs were allocated to one of four sectionals of twelve teams.

All sectional games were played on campus sites, while the national semifinals, third-place final, and championship finals were contested at the Salem Civic Center in Salem, Virginia.

Wisconsin–Platteville defeated Hope, 69–56, in the final, clinching their third overall national title and third championship in seven seasons (1991 and 1995). It was also Hope's second defeat in the final in three years (1996).

The Pioneers (30–0) were coached by Bo Ryan; this was the third title at Platteville for the future Wisconsin coach. Platteville were furthermore the first Division III team to finish a season undefeated since their own perfect season in 1995.

Ben Hoffmann, also from Platteville, was named Most Outstanding Player.

== Bracket ==
=== Top left sectional ===
First round
Williams	89
Trinity (CT)	63
Hamilton	102
Geneseo State	68
Salem State	86*
UMass Dartmouth	78
Brockport State	78
Nazareth	81

Second round
Springfield	75
Williams	82
Hamilton	87
St. John Fisher	72
Connecticut College	93
Salem State	84
Nazareth	75
St. Lawrence	96

Sectional semifinals
Williams	90
Hamilton	69
Connecticut College	77
St. Lawrence	94

Sectional finals
Williams	100
St. Lawrence	82

=== Bottom left sectional ===
First round
Ripon	73
Franklin	76
Gustavus Adolphus	78
Augsburg	70
Wabash	87
Aurora	80
UW–Oshkosh	93
Pomona–Pitzer	71

Second round
Illinois Wesleyan	95*
Franklin	92
Gustavus Adolphus	65
Nebraska Wesleyan	51
Chicago	67
Wabash	62
UW–Oshkosh	59
UW–Platteville	69

Sectional semifinals
Illinois Wesleyan	61
Gustavus Adolphus	67
Chicago	63
UW–Platteville	78

Sectional finals
Gustavus Adolphus	71
UW–Platteville	78

=== Top right sectional ===
First round
Jersey City State	71
NYU	58
Johns Hopkins	87
FDU Madison	47
Rowan	70
Kings Point	49
Scranton	77
Muhlenberg	61

Second round
Hunter	65
Jersey City State	60
Johns Hopkins	62
Catholic	67
TCNJ	58
Rowan	81
Scranton	57
Wilkes	59

Sectional semifinals
Hunter	84**
Catholic	82
Rowan	80
Wilkes	83**

Sectional finals
Hunter	55
Wilkes	58

=== Bottom right sectional ===
First round
Mississippi College	60
Sewanee	54
Baldwin Wallace	88
Allegheny	97
Trinity (TX)	60
Randolph–Macon	55
John Carroll	72
Albion	50

Second round
Christopher Newport	78
Mississippi College	67
Allegheny	66
Hope	80
Hampden–Sydney	76
Trinity (TX)	62
John Carroll	78
Wooster	59

Sectional semifinals
Christopher Newport	64
Hope	81
Hampden–Sydney	71
John Carroll	77

Sectional finals
Hope	84
John Carroll	66

=== National finals ===
- Site: Salem Civic Center, Salem, Virginia

National semifinals
Williams	68
UW–Platteville	82
Wilkes	61
Hope	81

National championship
UW–Platteville	69
Hope	56
National third-place
Williams	105
Wilkes	93

== See also ==
- 1998 NCAA Division I men's basketball tournament
- 1998 NCAA Division II men's basketball tournament
- 1998 NAIA Division I men's basketball tournament
- 1998 NAIA Division II men's basketball tournament
- 1998 NCAA Division III women's basketball tournament
