= 2003 NCAA Division II women's basketball tournament =

- Teams: 64
- Finals site: , St. Joseph Civic Arena; St. Joseph, MO
- Champions: South Dakota State (1st title)
- Runner-up: Northern Kentucky (2nd title game)
- Semifinalists: California (PA) (2nd Final Four); Bentley (7th Final Four)
- Winning coach: Aaron Johnston (1st title)
- MOP: Melissa Pater (South Dakota St.)
- Attendance: 2,556

The 2003 NCAA Division II women's basketball tournament involved 64 teams playing in a single-elimination tournament to determine the NCAA Division II women's college basketball national champion. It began March 14, 2003 and concluded with the championship game on March 29, 2003.

The first three rounds were hosted by top-seeded teams in regional play. The eight regional winners met for the quarterfinal and semifinals, better known as the "Elite Eight" and "Final Four" respectively, and National Championship game at the St. Joseph Civic Arena in St. Joseph, MO.

== Regionals ==
=== East - California, Pennsylvania ===
Location: Hamer Hall Host: California University of Pennsylvania

Regional Quarterfinals; Round of 64; March 14
3	Longwood	77
6	West Liberty	63
7	Pitt-Johnstown	56
2	Glenville State	70
5	West Chester	76
4	Pfeiffer	73
8	Millersville	58
1	California (PA.)	73

Regional semifinals Round of 32; March 15
3	Longwood	51
2	Glenville State	63
5	West Chester	58
1	California (PA.)	62

Regional finals Sweet Sixteen; March 17
2	Glenville State	67
1	California (PA.)	76

=== South Atlantic - Salisbury, North Carolina ===
Location: Goodman Gym Host: Catawba College

Regional Quarterfinals; Round of 64; March 14
7	North Florida	65
2	Armstrong Atlantic	64
6	Augusta St.	59
3	Columbus St.	68
5	Fayetteville St.	80
4	Catawba	72
8	Lenoir-Rhyne	69
1	Shaw	89

Regional semifinals Round of 32; March 15
7	North Florida	57
3	Columbus St.	56
5	Fayetteville St.	49
1	Shaw	67

Regional finals Sweet Sixteen; March 17
7	North Florida	71
1	Shaw	58

=== South Central - Topeka, Kansas ===
Location: Lee Arena Host: Washburn University

Regional Quarterfinals; Round of 64; March 14
6	Northeastern State	63
3	Drury	73
7	St. Mary's (Tex.)	65
2	Angelo St.	81
5	Emporia St.	68
4	Missouri Western St.	56
8	Midwestern St.	56
1	Washburn	67

Regional semifinals Round of 32; March 15
3	Drury	63
2	Angelo St.	56
5	Emporia St	60
1	Washburn	66

Regional finals Sweet Sixteen; March 17
3	Drury	71
1	Washburn	87

=== Great Lakes - Indianapolis, Indiana ===
Location: Nicoson Hall Host: University of Indianapolis

Regional Quarterfinals; Round of 64; March 14
7	Bellarmine	72
2	Hillsdale	71
6	Quincy	94
3	Lake Superior	85
8	Wayne St. (Mich.)	83
1	Indianapolis	91
5	Northern Kentucky	69
4	Grand Valley St.	63

Regional semifinals Round of 32; March 15
7	Bellarmine	93
6	Quincy	101
1	Indianapolis	57
5	Northern Kentucky	66

Regional finals Sweet Sixteen; March 17
6	Quincy	61
5	Northern Kentucky	64

=== South - Russellville, Arkansas ===
Location: Tucker Coliseum Host: Arkansas Tech University

Regional Quarterfinals; Round of 64; March 15
7	Henderson St.	82
2	Fort Valley St.	66
6	Rollins	55
3	Central Arkansas	74
8	Lincoln Memorial	50
1	Arkansas Tech	64
5	Tampa	62
4	Florida Southern	55

Regional semifinals Round of 32; March 16
7	Henderson St.	58
3	Central Arkansas	59
1	Arkansas Tech	55
5	Tampa	43

Regional finals Sweet Sixteen; March 17
3	Central Arkansas	68
1	Arkansas Tech	54

=== Northeast - Waltham, Massachusetts ===
Location: Dana Center Host: Bentley College

Regional Quarterfinals; Round of 64; March 14
7	South Connecticut St.	66
2	Mass.-Lowell	63
6	St. Thomas Aquinas	49
3	Stonehill	83
8	New Haven	65
1	Bentley	92
5	Merrimack	88
4	Dowling	73

Regional semifinals Round of 32; March 15
7	South Connecticut St.	49
3	Stonehill	57
1	Bentley	71
5	Merrimack	43

Regional finals Sweet Sixteen; March 17
3	Stonehill	44
1	Bentley	66

=== North Central - Brookings, South Dakota ===
Location: Frost Arena Host: South Dakota State University

Regional Quarterfinals; Round of 64; March 14
6	Neb. Kearney	69
3	North Dakota St.	76
7	Concordia-St. Paul	68
2	South Dakota	83
5	North Dakota	70
4	Minn.-Duluth	63
8	Regis (Colo.)	71
1	South Dakota St.	107

Regional semifinals Round of 32; March 15
3	North Dakota St.	61
2	South Dakota	84
5	North Dakota	56
1	South Dakota St.	77

Regional finals Sweet Sixteen; March 17
2	South Dakota	63
1	South Dakota St.	87

=== West - Seattle, Washington ===
Location: Royal Brougham Pavilion Host: Seattle Pacific University

Regional Quarterfinals; Round of 64; March 14
6	Northwest Nazarene	83
3	Western Washington	79
7	Cal. St. Stanislaus	106
2	Cal. St. Bakersfield	116*
5	Central Washington	69
4	Mont. St.-Billings	81
8	Cal St. Chico	70
1	Seattle Pacific	81

Regional semifinals Round of 32; March 15
6	Northwest Nazarene	84
2	Cal. St. Bakersfield	103
4	Mont. St.-Billings	70
1	Seattle Pacific	86

Regional finals Sweet Sixteen; March 17
2	Cal. St. Bakersfield	85
1	Seattle Pacific	80

== Elite Eight – St. Joseph, Missouri ==
Location: St. Joseph Civic Arena Host: Missouri Western State College

Quarterfinals; Elite Eight; Wednesday, March 26
E	California (PA.)	76
SA	North Florida	62
GL	Northern Kentucky	65
SC	Washburn	63
S	Central Arkansas	69
NE	Bentley	80
NC	South Dakota St.	83
W	Cal. St. Bakersfield	62

Semifinals; Final Four; Thursday, March 27
California (PA.)	43
Northern Kentucky	45
Bentley	62
South Dakota St.	69

National championship Saturday, March 29
Northern Kentucky	60
South Dakota St.	65

== All-Tournament team ==
- Melissa Pater, South Dakota St. - Most Outstanding Player
- Heather Sieler, South Dakota St.
- Sharell Snardon, Northern Kentucky
- Carone Harris, Central Arkansas
- Keri Flynn, Bentley

== See also ==
- 2003 NCAA Division I women's basketball tournament
- 2003 NCAA Division III women's basketball tournament
- 2003 NAIA Division I women's basketball tournament
- 2003 NAIA Division II women's basketball tournament
- 2003 NCAA Division II men's basketball tournament
