= Daemen Wildcats =

- University: Daemen University
- Conference: ECC (primary); NEC (men's volleyball)
- NCAA: Division II
- Athletic director: Traci Murphy
- Location: Amherst, New York
- Varsity teams: 15 (6 men's, 9 women's)
- Basketball arena: Lumsden Gymnasium
- Soccer stadium: Dimp Wagner Stadium
- Other venues: Elliott Tennis Courts (tennis); Niagara Frontier Country Club (golf)
- Nickname: Wildcats
- Colors: Blue and white
- Website: daemenwildcats.com
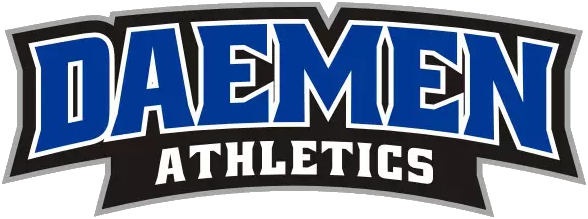

The Daemen Wildcats represent Daemen University in intercollegiate athletics. Daemen is a member of the East Coast Conference (ECC), competing at the Division II level of the National Collegiate Athletic Association (NCAA). Men's sports include basketball, cross country, golf, indoor track and outdoor track, soccer, tennis, and volleyball. Women's sports include basketball, bowling, cross country, indoor and outdoor track, soccer, tennis, triathlon, and volleyball. The college's official colors are royal blue, black, white, and grey.

== History ==
The Wildcats compete mainly in NCAA Division II and are part of the East Coast Conference (ECC) since the 2013–14 school year. They formerly competed in the National Association of Intercollegiate Athletics (NAIA) as part of the now-defunct American Mideast Conference (AMC) from 2001–02 to 2011–12; as well as an Independent during its transition to D-II in the 2012–13 school year.

Two Daemen sports compete as de facto NCAA Division I members. Women's triathlon, part of the NCAA Emerging Sports for Women program, is not part of the NCAA's divisional structure. Daemen competes as an independent in that sport. In men's volleyball, the NCAA holds a combined national championship for Divisions I and II. The Wildcats joined the D-I Northeast Conference as an associate member starting with the 2023 season (2022–23 school year).

== Varsity sports ==
=== Teams ===
Men's sports

- Basketball
- Cross Country
- Soccer
- Tennis
- Track & Field indoor
- Track & Field outdoor
- Volleyball

Women's sports

- Basketball
- Bowling
- Cross Country
- Soccer
- Tennis
- Track & Field indoor
- Track & Field outdoor
- Triathlon
- Volleyball
