= Harding Bisons =

Athletic teams representing Harding University

- University: Harding University
- Nickname: Bisons
- NCAA: Division II
- Conference: Great American Conference
- Athletic director: Jeff Morgan
- Location: Searcy, Arkansas
- Varsity teams: 19 (8 men's, 8 women's, 1 co-ed)
- Football stadium: First Security Stadium
- Basketball arena: Rhodes-Reaves Field House
- Baseball stadium: Jerry Moore Field
- Soccer stadium: Stevens Soccer Complex
- Colors: Black and gold
- Mascot: Buff the Bison
- Website: hardingsports.com

The Harding Bisons are the athletic teams that represent Harding University, located in Searcy, Arkansas, in NCAA Division II intercollegiate sports. The Bisons compete as members of the Great American Conference for all 16 varsity sports. Harding began in the Gulf South Conference in 2000 before moving to the newly formed Great American Conference (GAC) in 2011.

In the GAC's first season, Harding won conference championships in women's cross country and women's golf and placed second in the conference's all-sports trophy standings.

== Varsity teams ==
=== List of teams ===
Men's sports

- Baseball
- Basketball
- Cross Country
- Football
- Golf
- Soccer
- Tennis
- Track & Field

Women's sports

- Basketball
- Cross Country
- Golf
- Soccer
- Softball
- Tennis
- Track & Field
- Volleyball

== Individual sports ==
=== Baseball ===
Harding's baseball team qualified its first NCAA Tournament in 2011. The Bisons won a school-record 42 games, won the Gulf South Conference West Division, and finished the season ranked 24th in Division II. Five-time Major League Baseball All-Star Preacher Roe pitched for Harding. On April 27, 1937, Roe struck-out 26-batters in 13-innings for Harding against Arkansas Tech. The game ended in a 4-4 tie due to darkness.

=== Basketball ===
The current head coach of the Harding men's basketball team is Weston Jameson. Jameson is a Harding University and Harding Basketball alum, playing for the school between 2010 and 2014. He was the MVP of the 2014 Great American Conference Tournament, of which Harding won, earning a bid to the 2014 NCAA Men's Division II Basketball Tournament. Jameson took over as head coach in 2023 and has led Harding to back-to-back GAC conference titles in 2025 and 2026, with berths in the NCAA Men's Division II Basketball Tournament. He has a career coaching record at Harding (through the 2026 GAC tournament) of 58-34.

Prior to Jameson, Harding's head coach was Jeff Morgan. Morgan, who also served and still serves as the University's Athletic Director, was the basketball head coach for 30 seasons. In his 30 seasons as head coach of the Harding men's basketball team, Jeff Morgan posted a career record of 441-372. He led the Bisons to 21 postseason appearances, including six NCAA Division II national tournaments (1996, 2003, 2008, 2011, 2013, 2014, 2016) and one NAIA national tournament. In 2010–11, Morgan led the Bisons to a 25–5 record, a Gulf South Conference Tournament championship, its third berth in the NCAA Tournament, and a No. 11 national ranking.

In February 2013, the Rhodes Field House was named the Best Road Trip Destination in College Basketball by Enterprise Rent-A-Car and GEICO in an online fan poll, receiving more votes than nine Division I institutions, such as Indiana University, the University of Arizona, West Virginia University, and others.

Harding women's basketball has had six straight winning seasons under eighth-year head coach Tim Kirby. In 2011–12, the Lady Bisons advanced to the finals of the GAC Tournament in Bartlesville, Okla.

=== Bowling ===
In 1970, the Harding bowling team won the NAIA national championship.

=== Cross Country ===
The Bison cross country team, under head coach Steve Guymon, has won 10 conference championships and 10 regional championships during its time in the NCAA. Harding's men have also placed in the top 10 at the national meet seven times.

Harding women's cross country also has 10 conference championships, four regional championships and four top-10 finishes in the national meet since 1997.

=== Football ===
The Bison football team, under former coach Ronnie Huckeba and current coach Paul Simmons, are known for its prolific triple-option rushing attack. In 2011, Harding led Division II with 360.9 rushing yards per game. Coach Huckeba announced his retirement prior to the 2016 season, during which he was named the Don Hansen National Coach of the Year. The Bisons achieved a 13–1 record and finished in the NCAA Division II Quarterfinals. Four players from the 2016 season received All American Honors, and two more received honorable mention. Paul Simmons, former Defensive Coordinator for the Bisons since 2010, was named Head Coach, to begin in the 2017 season, by Athletic Director Greg Harnden.

=== Softball ===
Since its inception in the 2013–14 school year, the softball team has been coached by Phil Berry, formerly of the PGA.

=== Tennis ===
David Elliott served as the head tennis coach at Harding from 1975 until 2013. During his tenure his men's and women's teams combined for 1,136 victories during his career. Marco Ruiz, a Harding graduate, former Harding tennis athlete and native of São Paulo, Brazil, replaced Elliott as head tennis coach in 2013.

=== Volleyball ===
The Lady Bison volleyball squad has won seven conference championships since 2002 and earned four berths in the NCAA Division II National Tournament. Harding has a 113–12 (.904) winning percentage in conference play in the last 10 seasons.
