= Southern Nazarene Crimson Storm =

- University: Southern Nazarene University
- NCAA: Division II
- Conference: Great American (primary)
- Athletic director: Danny Thomason
- Location: Bethany, Oklahoma
- Varsity teams: 20
- Football stadium: SNU Stadium
- Basketball arena: Sawyer Center
- Baseball stadium: Cypert Athletics Complex
- Other venues: Broadhurst Gymnasium; SNU Tennis Stadium; Wanda Rhodes Complex; Equestrian Center
- Nickname: Crimson Storm
- Colors: Crimson and white
- Fight song: Fight for SNU
- Website: snuathletics.com
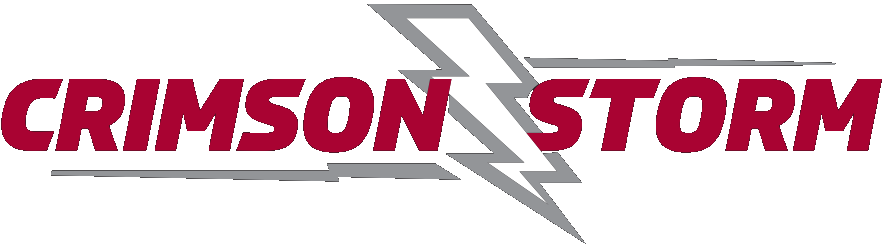

The Southern Nazarene Crimson Storm are the athletic teams that represent Southern Nazarene University, located in Bethany, Oklahoma, in intercollegiate sports as a member of the NCAA Division II ranks, primarily competing in the Great American Conference (GAC) since the 2012–13 academic year.

The Crimson Storm previously competed in the Sooner Athletic Conference (SAC) of the National Association of Intercollegiate Athletics (NAIA) from 1978–79 to 2011–12; and in the Texoma Athletic Conference from 1972–73 to 1977–78.

== Varsity teams ==
SNU compete in 20 intercollegiate varsity sports: Men's sports include baseball, basketball, cheerleading, cross country, equestrian, football, golf, rugby, soccer and track & field; while women's sports include basketball, cheerleading, cross country, equestrian, golf, rugby, soccer, softball, track & field and volleyball.

Men's sports	Women's sports
Baseball	Basketball
Basketball	Bowling
Bowling	Cheer
Cross country	Cross country
Equestrian	Equestrian
eSports	Rugby
Football	Soccer
Golf	Softball
Rugby	Stunt
Soccer	Track and field
Track and field	Volleyball

=== Baseball ===
Baseball came back to SNU in 1997 after almost a 20-year hiatus. Made in to the regional tournament in 2007 under coach Scott Selby. SNU recorded their first ever win in a regional that year, upsetting the nationally ranked Oklahoma City University Stars. Also in 2007, a new coach took over the Storm, Elliot Johnson. SNU's baseball team plays all of its home games at the Caulde and Betty Cypert Athletic Complex.

=== Men's basketball ===
Basketball has had a long tradition of excellence at SNU. The Crimson Storm, at the time the Bethany Nazarene Redskins, won the national championship in 1981, and were the national runner-up in 1998. They appeared in the NAIA tournament eleven times.

=== Women's basketball ===
Have the most wins in NAIA women's basketball history taking home the national tournament title seven times and have won four times in a row. Their most recent championship was 2013.

=== Equestrian ===
Although not recognized by the NAIA as a core sport, SNU has an equestrian team that competes in various horse shows and rodeos throughout the year.

=== Football ===
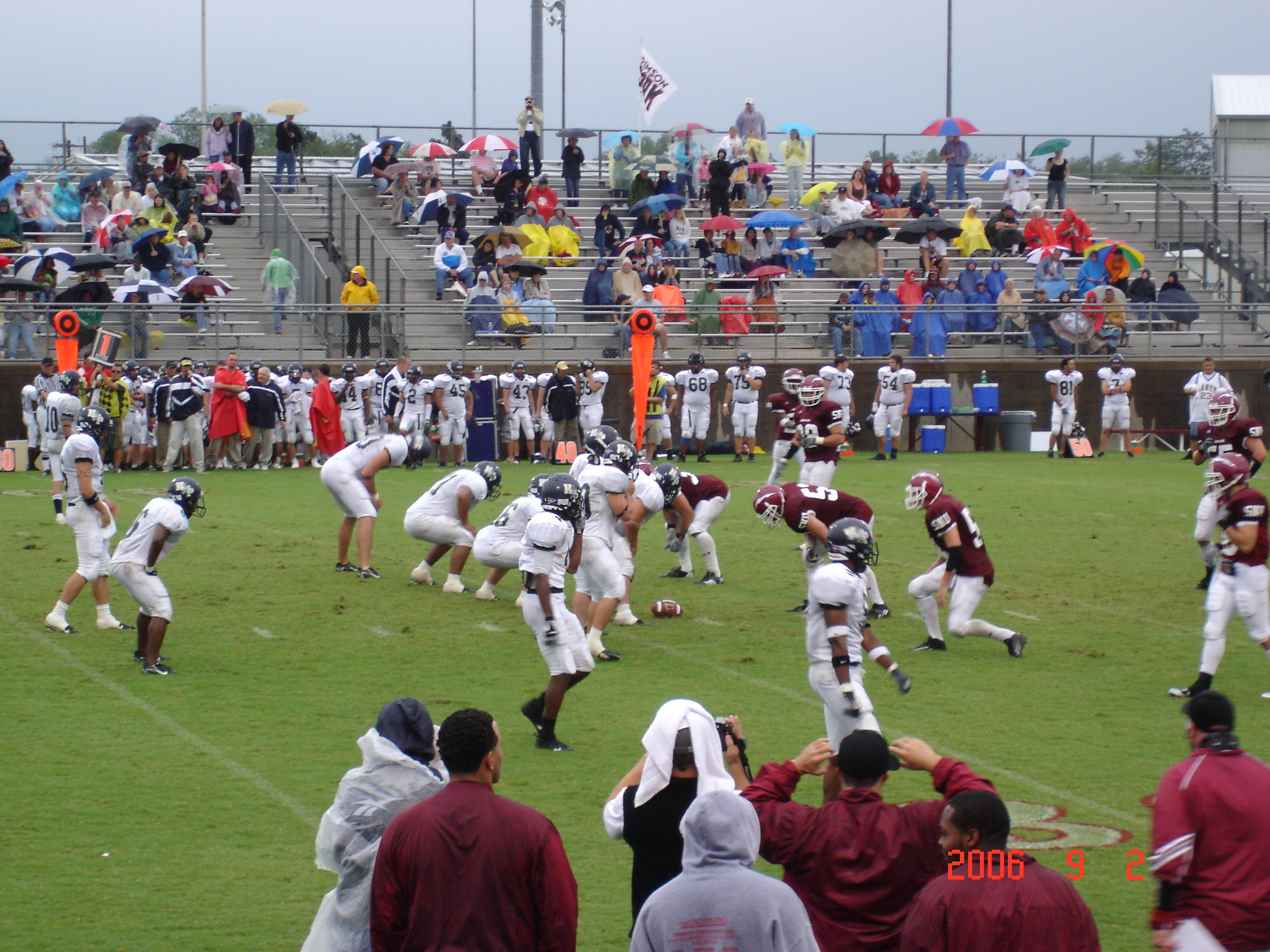
Southern Nazarene game in 2006

The Crimson Storm Football team was established in 2000. The football team has an 8-year combined record of 50-32. Although the Crimson Storm has not had a losing season over the past 8 years, it has also never made it to the playoffs. In 2004, the Crimson Storm joined the Central States Football League.

In 2007, SNU won its first season opener. The football team plays all their home games at SNU Football Stadium. This stadium is also shared with Bethany High School Bronchos football team, although the schools have separate practice facilities and locker rooms. SNU Football Stadium opened in 2001. It seats just under 10,000 and has lawn seating at both end zones. At the games, SNU's "Crimson Stix" perform drum-line cadences.

==== 2008 season ====
The Crimson Storm won their 2008 home opener on Saturday August 30, at 6 pm vs Eastern New Mexico University. This game had an almost 3 hour delay due to heavy thunderstorms. The 'Storm also defeated Olivet Nazarene University, but lost the next two games to University of Mary Hardin-Baylor and Oklahoma Panhandle State University.

=== Track ===
The Crimson Storm Track team competes in both men's and women's meets, as well as outdoor and indoor track and field events.

=== Volleyball ===
The Crimson Storm won the Sooner Athletic Conference tournament in 2006. The head coach of the volleyball team is Kevin Ingram.

=== Men's tennis ===
SNU Men's Tennis is the only sport to receive a self-administered (from the University not the NAIA) "death penalty" for ethics violations by team members in 1999. As of 2021, it is still not offered.

== Mascot ==
In 1999, the Crimson Storm athletic nickname replaced the "Redskins", and the "Thundercat" was debuted as the mascot in 2003.

== Staff ==
The current athletic director is Bobby Martin, and the SNU Sports Information Director is Scott Secor,.

== Facilities ==
Crimson Storm facilities include the Sawyer Center for basketball, indoor track, and volleyball, the Cypert Complex for baseball and softball, the Wanda Rhodes Complex for soccer, and the SNU Stadium for football. SNU Sports Information hosts the annual SNUPY Awards every spring.

== SNUPY Awards ==
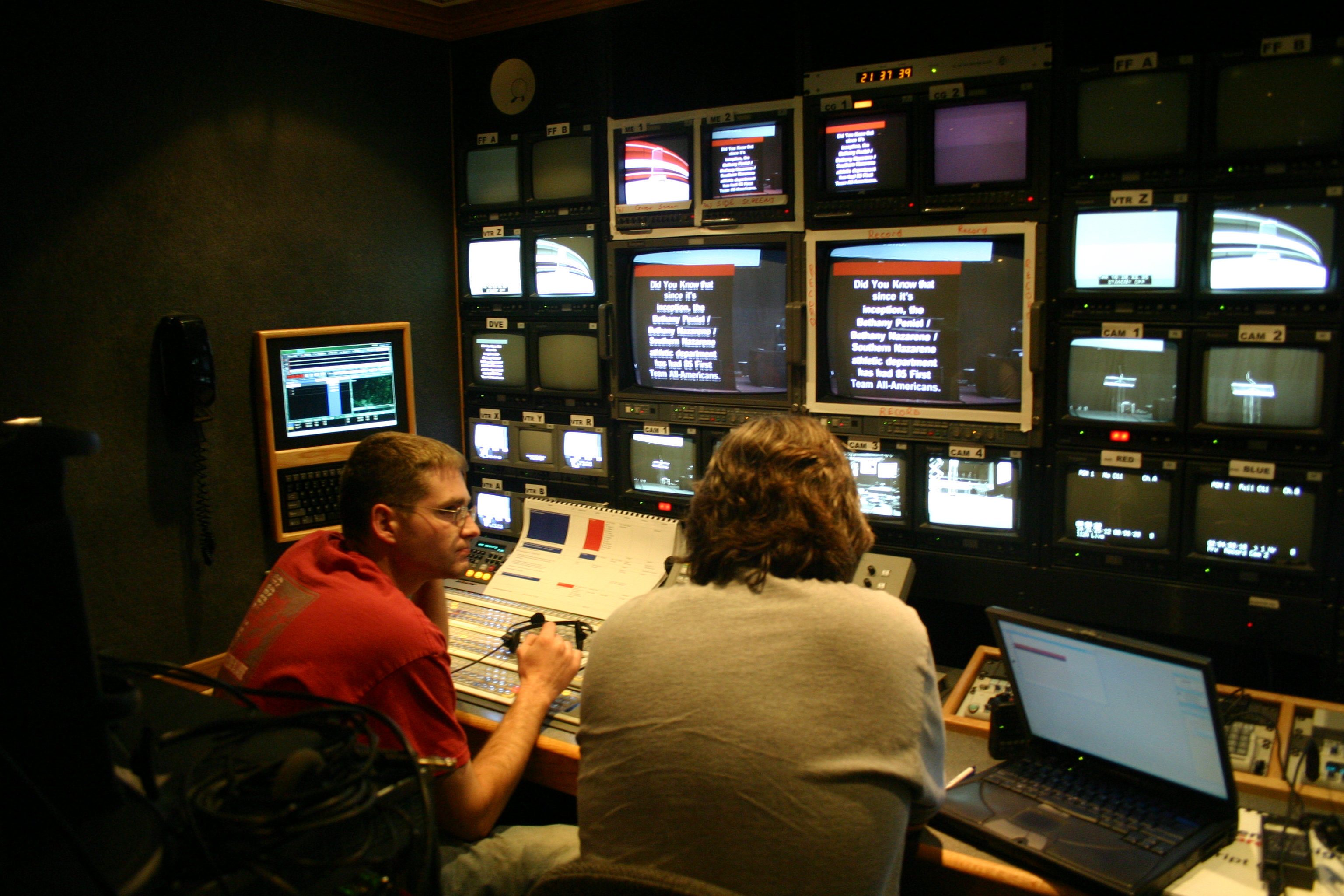
Event production at the video switcher

The SNUPY Awards "were created by the SNU Office of Sports Information in 2004 and designed to honor Southern Nazarene University’s Student-Athletes for excellence on the playing field, in the classroom and in life." Any one of SNU’s athletes are eligible to win a SNUPY based on their nomination in a specific category. They were inspired by and named similarly to the ESPY Awards.

In addition to special recognition of the current year's All-Americans, Academic All-Americans, and a special presentation to the graduating senior class. there are 20 other awards:

- Champions of Character Award
- Courage Award
- Crimson Heart Award
- Female Performance of the Year
- Male Performance of the Year
- Female Newcomer of the Year
- Male Newcomer of the Year
- Spirit Award
- Female Breakthrough Athlete of the Year
- Male Breakthrough Athlete of the Year
- Female Student Athlete of the Year
- Male Student Athlete of the Year
- Female Athlete of the Year
- Male Athlete of the Year
- Female Team of the Year
- Male Team of the Year
- Coach of the Year
- Mr. Storm
- Ms. Storm
- Heritage Moment

== Championships ==
- 1981 NAIA Division I men's basketball tournament

== Notable athletes ==
- Brandon Durham, an All-American basketball player who was once named as the NAIA Division I National Player of the Week
