= Saint Rose Golden Knights =

- University: College of Saint Rose
- NCAA: Division II
- Conference: Northeast-10
- Athletic director: Lori Anctil
- Location: Albany, New York
- Varsity teams: 18 (8 men's, 9 women's, 1 co-ed)
- Basketball arena: Daniel P. Nolan Gymnasium
- Baseball stadium: Plumeri Sports Complex
- Softball stadium: Plumeri Sports Complex
- Soccer stadium: Plumeri Sports Complex
- Aquatics center: Albany High Swimming Pool
- Lacrosse stadium: Plumeri Sports Complex
- Golf course: Pinehaven Country Club
- Nickname: Golden Knights
- Colors: Black and gold
- Mascot: Fear, the Golden Knight
- Website: gogoldenknights.com

Team NCAA championships
- 1

The Saint Rose Golden Knights were the athletic teams that represent the College of Saint Rose, located in Albany, New York, in NCAA Division II intercollegiate sports.

The Golden Knights were full members of the Northeast-10 Conference, which is home to all nineteen of its athletic programs. Saint Rose was a member of the Northeast-10 from 2000 until the school's closing in 2024. In 2011, the women's soccer team captured the school's only national championship.

== Varsity teams ==
=== List of teams ===
Men's sports (9)

- Baseball
- Basketball
- Cross Country
- Esports
- Golf
- Lacrosse
- Soccer
- Swimming and diving
- Track and field

Women's sports (10)

- Basketball
- Cross country
- Esports
- Golf
- Lacrosse
- Soccer
- Softball
- Swimming and diving
- Track and field
- Volleyball

== National championships ==
=== Team ===
Association	Division	Sport	Year	Opponent/Runner-up	Score
NCAA	Division II	Women's Soccer	2011	Grand Valley State	2–1
