= Gene Roebuck =

American basketball coach

Biographical details
- Born: February 8, 1947 (age 78)

Playing career
- 1966–1969: Mayville State

Coaching career (HC unless noted)

Basketball
- 1984–1987: Lake Region State College
- 1987–2012: North Dakota

Baseball
- 1990–1993: North Dakota

Head coaching record
- Overall: 628–145 (.812) (basketball); 99–61–1 (.618) (baseball)
- Tournaments: Basketball; 36–17 (NCAA Division II); 0–1 (NCAA Division I); 0–1 (WNIT); 2–5 (WBI); Baseball; 3–3 (NCAA Division II)

Accomplishments and honors

Championships
- 3x NCAA Division II Tournament (1997, 1998, 1999); 2x Great West Regular Season (2010, 2012); 2x Great West Tournament (2010, 2012); 11x NCC Regular Season (1990, 1991, 1993, 1994, 1998, 1999, 2001, 2002, 2005-2007); 7x NCC Tournament (2001-2007)

Awards
- 10x NCC Coach of the Year (1990, 1991, 1994, 1998, 1999, 2001, 2002, 2005-2007); 1x Great West Coach of the Year (2010); 1x Russell Athletic/WBCA Division II Region Coach of the Year

Gene Roebuck (born February 8, 1947) is the retired head coach of the women's basketball team at the University of North Dakota. He is a graduate of Mayville State University.

== Early years ==
Roebuck attended Velva Public School in Velva, ND. At Velva, he earned 12 letters in baseball, basketball, and football. He then attended Mayville State University where he played baseball and basketball.

== North Dakota basketball ==
Roebuck was hired to be head coach of North Dakota women's basketball team in June 1987. Won back-to-back-to-back national championships in 1997, 1998, 1999.

== North Dakota baseball ==
Roebuck was hired to be the baseball coach of the North Dakota Fighting Hawks in 1990. In 1993, he took the team to the 1993 NCAA Division II College World Series, but lost both games they played.

== Head coaching record ==
=== Basketball ===
Statistics overview
Season	Coach	Overall	Conference	Standing	Postseason
North Dakota Fighting Hawks (North Central Conference) (1987–2008)
1987–88	North Dakota	22–6	9—5	3rd	NCAA Division II First Round
1988–89	North Dakota	19–9	6—8	5th	
1989–90	North Dakota	27–4	16—2	1st	NCAA Division II Elite Eight
1990–91	North Dakota	28–2	17—1	1st	NCAA Division II Regional Final
1991–92	North Dakota	24–7	13—5	3rd	NCAA Division II Elite Eight
1992–93	North Dakota	23–5	16—2	T—1st	NCAA Division II First Round
1993–94	North Dakota	26–2	18—0	1st	NCAA Division II Regional Semifinals
1994–95	North Dakota	23–5	15—3	2nd	NCAA Division II Regional Semifinals
1995–96	North Dakota	26–6	14—4	3rd	NCAA Division II Regional Finals
1996–97	North Dakota	28–4	14—4	2nd	NCAA Division II Champions
1997–98	North Dakota	31–1	18—0	1st	NCAA Division II Champions
1998–99	North Dakota	31–1	17—1	1st	NCAA Division II Champions
1999–00	North Dakota	25–5	15—3	2nd	NCAA Division II Regional Finals
2000–01	North Dakota	29–4	15—3	1st	NCAA Division II Runner-up
2001–02	North Dakota	24–5	14—4	1st	NCAA Division II Regional Semifinals
2002–03	North Dakota	26–6	12—4	T—3rd	NCAA Division II Regional Semifinals
2003–04	North Dakota	27–6	12—4	3rd	NCAA Division II Regional Finals
2004–05	North Dakota	25–6	10—2	1st	NCAA Division II Regional Semifinals
2005–06	North Dakota	34–1	12—0	1st	NCAA Division II Regional Finals
2006–07	North Dakota	32–4	10—2	1st	NCAA Division II Elite Eight
2007–08	North Dakota	27–4	10—2	2nd	NCAA Division II First Round
North Dakota Fighting Hawks (Division I Independents) (2008–2009)
2008–09	North Dakota	18–11	—	—	
North Dakota Fighting Hawks (Great West Conference) (2009–2012)
2009–10	North Dakota	17–14	11—1	1st	
2010–11	North Dakota	15–16	8—4	2nd	
2011–12	North Dakota	21–11	9—1	1st	WBI First Round
North Dakota:		628–145 (.812)	300–65 (.822)		
Total:		628–145 (.812)			
National champion Postseason invitational champion Conference regular season champion Conference regular season and conference tournament champion Division regular season champion Division regular season and conference tournament champion Conference tournament champion

=== Baseball ===
Statistics overview
Season	Team	Overall	Conference	Standing	Postseason
North Dakota Fighting Hawks (North Central Conference) (1990–1993)
1990	North Dakota	24–16	5–3	2nd (Northern)	
1991	North Dakota	24–17	6–4	T–2nd (Northern)	
1992	North Dakota	22–14	7–3	1st (Northern)	
1993	North Dakota	29–14–1	6–3	2nd (Northern)	NCAA Division II College World Series
North Dakota:		99–61–1 (.618)	24–13 (.649)		
Total:		99–61–1 (.618)			
National champion Postseason invitational champion Conference regular season champion Conference regular season and conference tournament champion Division regular season champion Division regular season and conference tournament champion Conference tournament champion

== See also ==
- List of college women's basketball career coaching wins leaders
