= 1999 NCAA Division II women's basketball tournament =

- Teams: 48
- Finals site: , Pine Bluff, Arkansas
- Champions: North Dakota Fighting Sioux (3rd title)
- Runner-up: Arkansas Tech Golden Suns (1st title game)
- Semifinalists: Emporia State Lady Hornets (2nd Final Four); Northern Kentucky Norse (2nd Final Four)
- Winning coach: Gene Roebuck (3rd title)
- MOP: Jenny Crouse (North Dakota)

The 1999 NCAA Division II women's basketball tournament was the 18th annual tournament hosted by the NCAA to determine the national champion of Division II women's collegiate basketball in the United States.

Two-time defending champions North Dakota defeated Arkansas Tech in the championship game, 80–63, to claim the Fighting Sioux's third consecutive and third overall NCAA Division II national title.

The championship rounds were contested in Pine Bluff, Arkansas.

Three teams made their first appearances in the NCAA Division II tournament: Binghamton, Lander, and Western Washington.

== Regionals ==
=== East - Indiana, Pennsylvania ===
Location: Memorial Field House Host: Indiana University of Pennsylvania

First round Round of 48; March 4
3	Belmont Abbey	77
6	West Liberty State	64
Millersville	75
Pitt Johnstown	71

Regional semifinals Round of 32; March 5
2	Shippensburg	86
3	Belmont Abbey	62
Millersville	59
1	Indiana (PA)	69

Regional finals Sweet 16; March 6
2	Shippensburg	75
1	Indiana (PA)	85

=== Great Lakes - Highland Heights, Kentucky ===
Location: Regents Hall Host: Northern Kentucky University

First round Round of 48; March 4
3	Northern Michigan	61
6	SIU Edwardsville	67
Bellarmine	57
Grand Valley State	70

Regional semifinals Round of 32; March 5
2	Michigan Tech	87
6	SIU Edwardsville	73
Grand Valley State	67
1	Northern Kentucky	85

Regional finals Sweet 16; March 6
2	Michigan Tech	63
1	Northern Kentucky	65

=== North Central - Grand Forks, North Dakota ===
Location: Hyslop Sports Center Host: University of North Dakota

First round Round of 48; March 4
5	Augustana (SD)	66
4	South Dakota State	62
6	Minnesota Duluth	66*
3	Nebraska–Kearney	65

Regional semifinals Round of 32; March 5
1	North Dakota	84
5	Augustana (SD)	62
6	Minnesota Duluth	50
2	North Dakota State	61

Regional finals Sweet 16; March 6
1	North Dakota	83
2	North Dakota State	60

=== Northeast - Waltham, Massachusetts ===
Location: Dana Center Host: Bentley College

First round Round of 48; March 4
4	Franklin Pierce	51
5	Saint Anselm	59
Binghamton	64
Stonehill	65

Regional semifinals Round of 32; March 5
1	Bentley	64
5	Saint Anselm	57
Stonehill	37
2	Saint Rose	60

Regional finals Sweet 16; March 6
1	Bentley	54
2	Saint Rose	48

=== South - Fort Valley, Georgia ===
Location: George Woodward Gymnasium Host: Fort Valley State University

First round Round of 48; March 4
6	Clark Atlanta	69
3	Delta State	88
4	Arkansas Tech	62
5	Florida Southern	59

Regional semifinals Round of 32; March 5
2	Fort Valley State	81
3	Delta State	68
4	Arkansas Tech	79
1	Rollins	64

Regional finals Sweet 16; March 6
2	Fort Valley State	52
4	Arkansas Tech	63

=== South Atlantic - Florence, South Carolina ===
Location: Smith University Center Host: Francis Marion University

First round Round of 48; March 4
Presbyterian	76
Wingate	77
3	Kennesaw State	69
6	Lander	39

Regional semifinals Round of 32; March 5
1	Francis Marion	85
Wingate	72
3	Kennesaw State	81
2	Bowie State	70

Regional finals Sweet 16; March 6
1	Francis Marion	72
3	Kennesaw State	76

=== South Central - Emporia, Kansas ===
Location: White Auditorium Host: Emporia State University

First round Round of 48; March 4
Southwest Baptist	65
West Texas A&M	68
6	Abilene Christian	79
3	Truman State	94

Regional semifinals Round of 32; March 5
1	Emporia State	99
West Texas A&M	61
3	Truman State	78
2	Missouri Western	68

Regional finals Sweet 16; March 6
1	Emporia State	110
3	Truman State	93

=== West - Davis, California ===
Location: Recreation Hall Host: University of California, Davis

First round Round of 48; March 4
6	Seattle Pacific	69
3	Western Washington	77*
4	Cal Poly Pomona	53
5	Sonoma State	50

Regional semifinals Round of 32; March 5
2	Montana State Billings	70
3	Western Washington	48
4	Cal Poly Pomona	59
1	UC Davis	67

Regional finals Sweet 16; March 6
2	Montana State Billings	70
1	UC Davis	62

== Elite Eight - Pine Bluff, Arkansas ==
Location: Pine Bluff Convention Center Host: University of Arkansas at Pine Bluff

National quarterfinals Elite Eight; March 17
NC	North Dakota	96
SA	Kennesaw State	69
SC	Emporia State	99
NE	Bentley	72
S	Arkansas Tech	68
W	Montana State Billings	56
GL	Northern Kentucky	75
E	Indiana (PA)	67

National semifinals Final Four; March 18
NC	North Dakota	87
SC	Emporia State	81
S	Arkansas Tech	62
GL	Northern Kentucky	57

National championship March 20
NC	North Dakota	80
S	Arkansas Tech	63

== All-tournament team ==
- Jenny Crouse, North Dakota
- Katie Richards, North Dakota
- Jamie Pudenz, North Dakota
- Khelli Mullen, Arkansas Tech
- Jurgita Kausaite, Emporia State

== See also ==
- 1999 NCAA Division II men's basketball tournament
- 1999 NCAA Division I women's basketball tournament
- 1999 NCAA Division III women's basketball tournament
- 1999 NAIA Division I women's basketball tournament
- 1999 NAIA Division II women's basketball tournament
