= 1998 NCAA Division II women's basketball tournament =

- Teams: 48
- Finals site: , Pine Bluff, Arkansas
- Champions: North Dakota Fighting Sioux (2nd title)
- Runner-up: Emporia State Lady Hornets (1st title game)
- Semifinalists: Francis Marion Patriots (1st Final Four); Northern Michigan Wildcats (1st Final Four)
- Winning coach: Gene Roebuck (2nd title)
- MOP: Jenny Crouse (North Dakota)

The 1998 NCAA Division II women's basketball tournament was the 17th annual tournament hosted by the NCAA to determine the national champion of Division II women's collegiate basketball in the United States.

Defending champions North Dakota defeated Emporia State in the championship game, 92–76, to claim the Fighting Sioux's second NCAA Division II national title. This would go on to be the second of three consecutive titles for North Dakota.

The championship rounds were contested in Pine Bluff, Arkansas.

== Regionals ==
=== East - Philippi, West Virginia ===
Location: Rex Pyles Arena Host: Alderson-Broaddus College

First round Round of 48; March 5
3	Belmont Abbey	68
6	Bloomsburg	74
5	Charleston (WV)	73
4	Edinboro	81

Regional semifinals Round of 32; March 6
2	Alderson Broaddus	81
6	Bloomsburg	86
4	Edinboro	78
1	Shippensburg	88

Regional finals Sweet 16; March 7
6	Bloomsburg	62
1	Shippensburg	91

=== Great Lakes - Evansville, Indiana ===
Location: Physical Activities Center Host: University of Southern Indiana

First round Round of 48; March 5
5	Michigan Tech	60
4	SIU Edwardsville	47
6	Lewis (IL)	58
3	Grand Valley State	73

Regional semifinals Round of 32; March 6
1	Southern Indiana	92
5	Michigan Tech	94**
3	Grand Valley State	69
2	Northern Michigan	94

Regional finals Sweet 16; March 7
5	Michigan Tech	58
2	Northern Michigan	74

=== North Central - Grand Forks, North Dakota ===
Location: Hyslop Sports Center Host: University of North Dakota

First round Round of 48; March 6
4	Metro State Denver	64
5	Northern Colorado	74
3	North Dakota State	73
6	Northern State (SD)	76

Regional semifinals Round of 32; March 7
1	North Dakota	96
5	Northern Colorado	68
6	Northern State (SD)	78
2	Nebraska–Kearney	81**

Regional finals Sweet 16; March 8
1	North Dakota	79
2	Nebraska–Kearney	68

=== Northeast - Albany, New York ===
Location: Activities Center Host: College of Saint Rose

First round Round of 48; March 5
Philadelphia Textile	63
Stonehill	59
3	Franklin Pierce	57
6	UMass Lowell	48

Regional semifinals Round of 32; March 6
1	Saint Rose	102
Philadelphia Textile	67
3	Franklin Pierce	43
2	Bentley	77

Regional finals Sweet 16; March 7
1	Saint Rose	49
2	Bentley	50

=== South - Russellville, Arkansas ===
Location: Tucker Coliseum Host: Arkansas Tech University

First round Round of 48; March 6
6	Albany State	64
3	West Florida	70
5	Arkansas–Monticello	80
4	Delta State	68

Regional semifinals Round of 32; March 7
2	Arkansas Tech	75
3	West Florida	53
5	Arkansas–Monticello	77
1	Florida Southern	75

Regional finals Sweet 16; March 8
2	Arkansas Tech	84
5	Arkansas–Monticello	53

=== South Atlantic - Florence, South Carolina ===
Location: Smith University Center Host: Francis Marion University

First round Round of 48; March 5
6	Carson-Newman	77
3	Columbus State	92
4	Presbyterian	74
5	Virginia Union	65

Regional semifinals Round of 32; March 6
2	Francis Marion	77
3	Columbus State	74
4	Presbyterian	59
1	Bowie State	63

Regional finals Sweet 16; March 7
2	Francis Marion	62
1	Bowie State	52

=== South Central - Emporia, Kansas ===
Location: William L. White Auditorium Host: Emporia State University

First round Round of 48; March 5
3	Abilene Christian	92
6	Southwest Baptist	82
Central Missouri	69
Pittsburg State	56

Regional semifinals Round of 32; March 6
2	Missouri Western	83
3	Abilene Christian	86*
Central Missouri State	49
1	Emporia State	77

Regional finals Sweet 16; March 7
3	Abilene Christian	64
1	Emporia State	95

=== West - Seattle, Washington ===
Location: Royal Brougham Pavilion Host: Seattle Pacific University

First round Round of 48; March 5
4	Cal State San Bernardino	54
5	Sonoma State	50
3	UC Davis	72
6	Cal Poly Pomona	61

Regional semifinals Round of 32; March 6
1	Seattle Pacific	79
4	Cal State San Bernardino	72
3	UC Davis	69
2	Montana State Billings	66

Regional finals Sweet 16; March 7
1	Seattle Pacific	91*
3	UC Davis	82

== Elite Eight - Pine Bluff, Arkansas ==
Location: Pine Bluff Convention Center Host: University of Arkansas at Pine Bluff

National quarterfinals Elite Eight; March 18
GL	Northern Michigan	86
W	Seattle Pacific	57
NC	North Dakota	71
NE	Bentley	56
SA	Francis Marion	69*
S	Arkansas Tech	61
SC	Emporia State	122
E	Shippensburg	84

National semifinals Final Four; March 19
GL	Northern Michigan	69
NC	North Dakota	79
SA	Francis Marion	75
SC	Emporia State	90

National championship Third Place Game; March 21
NC	North Dakota	92
SC	Emporia State	76
Third Place Game
GL	Northern Michigan	90
SA	Francis Marion	75

== All-tournament team ==
- Jenny Crouse, North Dakota
- Mandy Arndtson, North Dakota
- Jaime Pudenz, North Dakota
- Jurgita Kausaite, Emporia State
- Aneta Kausaite, Emporia State
- Jennifer Barbson, Francis Marion

== See also ==
- 1998 NCAA Division II men's basketball tournament
- 1998 NCAA Division I women's basketball tournament
- 1998 NCAA Division III women's basketball tournament
- 1998 NAIA Division I women's basketball tournament
- 1998 NAIA Division II women's basketball tournament
