= 2001 NCAA Division II women's basketball tournament =

- Teams: 48
- Finals site: Mayo Civic Center, Rochester, Minnesota
- Champions: Cal Poly Pomona (4th title)
- Runner-up: North Dakota (4th title game)
- Semifinalists: Columbus State (2nd Final Four); Shippensburg (2nd Final Four)
- Winning coach: Paul Thomas (1st title)
- MOP: Aprile Powell (Cal Poly Pomona)

The 2001 NCAA Division II women's basketball tournament was the 20th annual tournament hosted by the NCAA to determine the national champion of Division II women's collegiate basketball in the United States.

Cal Poly Pomona defeated North Dakota in the championship game, 87–80 after overtime, to claim the Broncos' fourth NCAA Division II national title and first since 1986.

The championship rounds were contested at Mayo Civic Center in Rochester, Minnesota.

== Regionals ==
=== East - Shippensburg, Pennsylvania ===
Location: Heiges Field House Host: Shippensburg University of Pennsylvania

First round Round of 48; March 8
4	Pitt Johnstown	90
5	West Liberty State	84
6	Belmont Abbey	80
3	Bloomsburg	86

Regional semifinals Round of 32; March 9
1	Shippensburg	80
4	Pitt Johnstown	70
3	Bloomsburg	91
2	West Chester	87

Regional finals Sweet 16; March 10
1	Shippensburg	76
3	Bloomsburg	75

=== Great Lakes - Houghton, Michigan ===
Location: SDC Gymnasium Host: Michigan Technological University

First round Round of 48; March 9
4	Northern Michigan	65
5	SIU Edwardsville	58
6	Gannon	73
3	Northern Kentucky	64

Regional semifinals Round of 32; March 10
1	Michigan Tech	63
4	Northern Michigan	76
6	Gannon	79
2	Southern Indiana	84

Regional finals Sweet 16; March 11
4	Northern Michigan	77
2	Southern Indiana	86

=== North Central - Grand Forks, North Dakota ===
Location: Hyslop Sports Center Host: University of North Dakota

First round Round of 48; March 9
5	St. Cloud State	80
4	SW Minnesota State	74
6	Minnesota Duluth	81
3	North Dakota State	73

Regional semifinals Round of 32; March 10
1	North Dakota	76
5	St. Cloud State	63
6	Minnesota Duluth	61
2	Nebraska–Kearney	57

Regional finals Sweet 16; March 11
1	North Dakota	71
6	Minnesota Duluth	56

=== Northeast - Waltham, Massachusetts ===
Location: Dana Center Host: Bentley College

First round Round of 48; March 9
4	American International	78
5	C.W. Post	62
3	Pace	76
6	Philadelphia	63

Regional semifinals Round of 32; March 10
1	Bentley	76
4	American International	62
3	Pace	67
2	Saint Rose	60

Regional finals Sweet 16; March 11
1	Bentley	75
3	Pace	86

=== South - Cleveland, Mississippi ===
Location: Walter Sillers Coliseum Host: Delta State University

First round Round of 48; March 8
4	Arkansas Tech	78
5	Fort Valley State	41
6	Barry	76
3	Florida Southern	69

Regional semifinals Round of 32; March 9
1	Delta State	67
4	Arkansas Tech	62
6	Barry	74
2	Rollins	67

Regional finals Sweet 16; March 10
1	Delta State	86
6	Barry	62

=== South Atlantic - Columbus, Georgia ===
Location: Frank G. Lumpkin Center Host: Columbus State University

First round Round of 48; March 8
4	North Carolina Central	81
5	Wingate	67
6	Fayetteville State	61
3	Francis Marion	69

Regional semifinals Round of 32; March 9
1	Columbus State	71
4	North Carolina Central	69
3	Francis Marion	80
2	Catawba	64

Regional finals Sweet 16; March 10
1	Columbus State	75
3	Francis Marion	71

=== South Central - Emporia, Kansas ===
Location: White Auditorium Host: Emporia State University

First round Round of 48; March 8
4	Missouri Western State	69
5	SE Oklahoma State	67
3	Midwestern State	60
6	Southwest Baptist	70

Regional semifinals Round of 32; March 9
1	Emporia State	76
4	Missouri Western	58
6	Southwest Baptist	61
2	Texas A&M–Kingsville	69

Regional finals Sweet 16; March 10
1	Emporia State	69
2	Texas A&M–Kingsville	71

=== West - Pomona, California ===
Location: Kellogg Gym Host: California State Polytechnic University, Pomona

First round Round of 48; March 8
5	Central Washington	66
4	Western Washington	74
6	Alaska	86
3	Cal State Bakersfield	75

Regional semifinals Round of 32; March 9
1	Cal Poly Pomona	91
4	Western Washington	85
6	Alaska	75
2	Seattle Pacific	84

Regional finals Sweet 16; March 10
1	Cal Poly Pomona	63
2	Seattle Pacific	62

== Elite Eight - Rochester, Minnesota ==
Location: Mayo Civic Center Host: Winona State University

National quarterfinals Elite Eight; March 21
E	Shippensburg	70
S	Delta State	65
NC	North Dakota	88
SC	Texas A&M–Kingsville	60
W	Cal Poly Pomona	74
NE	Pace	54
SA	Columbus State	79
GL	Southern Indiana	73

National semifinals Final Four; March 22
E	Shippensburg	67
NC	North Dakota	76
W	Cal Poly Pomona	80
SA	Columbus State	72

National championship March 24
NC	North Dakota	80
W	Cal Poly Pomona	87*

== All-tournament team ==
- Aprile Powell, Cal Poly Pomona
- LaTasha Burnett, Cal Poly Pomona
- Jenny Boll, North Dakota
- Mandy Arndtson, North Dakota
- Jessie Gordon, Shippensburg

== See also ==
- 2001 NCAA Division I women's basketball tournament
- 2001 NCAA Division III women's basketball tournament
- 2001 NAIA Division I women's basketball tournament
- 2001 NAIA Division II women's basketball tournament
- 2001 NCAA Division II men's basketball tournament
