= 1997 NCAA Division II women's basketball tournament =

- Teams: 48
- Finals site: , Grand Forks, North Dakota
- Champions: North Dakota Fighting Sioux (1st title)
- Runner-up: Southern Indiana Screaming Eagles (1st title game)
- Third place: UC Davis Aggies (1st Final Four)
- Fourth place: Bentley Falcons (6th Final Four)
- Winning coach: Gene Roebuck (1st title)
- MOP: Jaime Pudenz (North Dakota)

The 1997 NCAA Division II women's basketball tournament was the 16th annual tournament hosted by the NCAA to determine the national champion of Division II women's collegiate basketball in the United States.

North Dakota defeated Southern Indiana in the championship game, 94–78, to claim the Fighting Sioux's first NCAA Division II national title. This would go on to be the first of three consecutive titles for North Dakota.

The championship rounds were contested in Grand Forks, North Dakota.

== Regionals ==
=== East - Shippensburg, Pennsylvania ===
Location: Heiges Field House Host: Shippensburg University of Pennsylvania

First round Round of 48; March 6
6	Edinboro	87
3	West Liberty State	75
5	High Point	80
4	Longwood	64

Regional semifinals Round of 32; March 7
2	West Chester	56
6	Edinboro	64
5	High Point	71
1	Shippensburg	53

Regional finals Sweet 16; March 8
6	Edinboro	70
5	High Point	68

=== Great Lakes - Marquette, Michigan ===
Location: Hedgcock Fieldhouse Host: Northern Michigan University

First round Round of 48; March 6
Bellarmine	80
Michigan Tech	83*
Oakland	83
Saginaw Valley State	72

Regional semifinals Round of 32; March 7
2	Southern Indiana	66
Michigan Tech	48
Oakland	56
1	Northern Michigan	66

Regional finals Sweet 16; March 8
2	Southern Indiana	78
1	Northern Michigan	67

=== North Central - Fargo, North Dakota ===
Location: Bison Sports Arena Host: North Dakota State University

First round Round of 48; March 7
3	Augustana (SD)	65
6	Northern State (SD)	68
4	Nebraska–Kearney	82*
5	Northern Colorado	76

Regional semifinals Round of 32; March 8
2	North Dakota	88
6	Northern State (SD)	76
4	Nebraska–Kearney	65
1	North Dakota State	76

Regional finals Sweet 16; March 9
2	North Dakota	73
1	North Dakota State	66

=== Northeast - Waltham, Massachusetts ===
Location: Dana Center Host: Bentley College

First round Round of 48; March 5
Saint Anselm	64
UMass Lowell	65
Philadelphia Textile	50
Stonehill	65

Regional semifinals Round of 32; March 6
1	Bentley	72
UMass Lowell	57
Stonehill	77
2	Saint Rose	60

Regional finals Sweet 16; March 7
1	Bentley	52
Stonehill	41

=== South - Melbourne, Florida ===
Location: Percy Hedgecock Gymnasium Host: Florida Institute of Technology

First round Round of 48; March 6
5	Fort Valley State	70
4	Valdosta State	58
Alabama A&M	63
Kentucky State	78

Regional semifinals Round of 32; March 7
1	Florida Tech	59
5	Fort Valley State	67
Kentucky State	61
2	Delta State	83

Regional finals Sweet 16; March 8
5	Fort Valley State	58
2	Delta State	81

=== South Atlantic - Marietta, Georgia ===
Location: Owl's Nest Host: Kennesaw State University

First round Round of 48; March 6
3	Fayetteville State	85
6	Francis Marion	83
4	Georgia College	96
5	Wingate	88

Regional semifinals Round of 32; March 7
2	Kennesaw State	99
3	Fayetteville State	65
4	Georgia College	63
1	Bowie State	75

Regional finals Sweet 16; March 8
2	Kennesaw State	74
1	Bowie State	68

=== South Central - St. Joseph, Missouri ===
Location: MWSC Fieldhouse Host: Missouri Western State College

First round Round of 48; March 6
Central Missouri	51
Emporia State	54
4	Abilene Christian	92
5	Pittsburg State	78

Regional semifinals Round of 32; March 7
2	West Texas A&M	77*
Emporia State	76
4	Abilene Christian	71
1	Missouri Western	75

Regional finals Sweet 16; March 8
2	West Texas A&M	92
1	Missouri Western	72

=== West - Davis, California ===
Location: Recreation Hall Host: University of California, Davis

First round Round of 48; March 7
5	Cal Poly Pomona	69
4	Montana State Billings	67
Grand Canyon	68
Western New Mexico	80

Regional semifinals Round of 32; March 8
1	UC Davis	79
5	Cal Poly Pomona	52
Western New Mexico	85
2	Seattle Pacific	106

Regional finals Sweet 16; March 9
1	UC Davis	74
2	Seattle Pacific	69

== Elite Eight - Grand Forks, North Dakota ==
Location: Hyslop Sports Center Host: University of North Dakota

National quarterfinals Elite Eight; March 19
GL	Southern Indiana	70
S	Delta State	55
W	UC Davis	73
SC	West Texas A&M	70
NE	Bentley	55
SA	Kennesaw State	48
NC	North Dakota	81
E	Edinboro	46

National semifinals Final Four; March 20
GL	Southern Indiana	70
W	UC Davis	62
NE	Bentley	48
NC	North Dakota	70

National championship Third Place Game; March 22
GL	Southern Indiana	78
NC	North Dakota	94
Third Place Game
W	UC Davis	76
NE	Bentley	61

== All-tournament team ==
- Jaime Pudenz, North Dakota
- Jenny Crouse, North Dakota
- Kelli Britz, North Dakota
- LeeAnn Freeland, Southern Indiana
- Eileen Weber, Southern Indiana
- Jennifer Gross, UC Davis

== See also ==
- 1997 NCAA Division II men's basketball tournament
- 1997 NCAA Division I women's basketball tournament
- 1997 NCAA Division III women's basketball tournament
- 1997 NAIA Division I women's basketball tournament
- 1997 NAIA Division II women's basketball tournament
