= List of North Dakota State Bison women's basketball head coaches =

The following is a list of North Dakota State Bison women's basketball head coaches. There have been 11 head coaches of the Bison in their 58-year history.

North Dakota State's current head coach is Jory Collins. He was hired as the new Bison head coach in April 2019, replacing Maren Walseth who was fired after the 2018–19 season.

| No. | Tenure | Coach | Years | Record | Pct. |
|---|---|---|---|---|---|
| 1 | 1966–1969 | Collette Folstad | 4 | 25–10 | .714 |
| 2 | 1970–1971 | Carol Mondor | 1 | 3–8 | .273 |
| 3 | 1971–1972 | Sue Feeney | 1 | 7–4 | .636 |
| 4 | 1972–1973 | Sharon Anderson | 1 | 6–10 | .375 |
| 5 | 1973–1975 | Pat Halvorson | 2 | 16–14 | .533 |
| 6 | 1975–1977 | Judy Strachen | 2 | 7–36 | .163 |
| 7 | 1977–1979 | Paul McKinnon | 2 | 25–40 | .385 |
| 8 | 1979–2008 | Amy Ruley | 25 | 671–198 | .772 |
| 9 | 2008–2014 | Carolyn DeHoff | 6 | 72–105 | .407 |
| 10 | 2014–2019 | Maren Walseth | 5 | 40–106 | .274 |
| 11 | 2019–present | Jory Collins | 7 | 123–85 | .591 |
| Totals | | 11 coaches | 60 seasons | 994–615 | .618 |
Records updated through end of 2025–26 season Source
