= SIU Edwardsville Cougars women's basketball =

SIU Edwardsville Cougars
2024–25 SIU Edwardsville Cougars women's basketball team
- University: Southern Illinois University Edwardsville
- Head coach: Samantha Quigley Smith (4th season)
- Location: Edwardsville, Illinois
- Arena: The Sam M. Vadalabene Center (capacity: 4,000)
- Conference: Ohio Valley
- Nickname: Cougars
- Colors: Red and white

NCAA Division I tournament second round
- D-II: 1999

NCAA Division I tournament appearances
- D-II: 1994, 1998, 1999, 2001, 2007

Uniforms
Home	Away

The SIU Edwardsville Cougars women's basketball team represents Southern Illinois University Edwardsville (SIUE) in the Ohio Valley Conference of NCAA Division I basketball. The Cougars play their home matches at the Sam M. Vadalabene Center located in the SIUE core campus in Edwardsville, Illinois.

== History ==
SIU Edwardsville began play in 1974. They made the NCAA Division II Tournament five times (1994, 1998, 1999, 2001, 2007) before they joined Division I. They joined the Ohio Valley Conference in 2011. They made the 2012 Women's Basketball Invitational, their first ever Division I postseason appearance, though they lost to Wright State 73–64.

The Cougars finished the 2019–2020 season with a 3-26 overall record. Their 1-17 OVC record put them at the bottom of the conference standings and kept them out of postseason play. SIUE's lone wins came against Missouri S&T, Evansville and Tennessee State.

SIUE fired coach Paula Buscher on March 19, 2021, after 9 seasons and a 117–152 record. The Cougars hired Samantha Quigley Smith from D-II Lewis University on April 27.

== Postseason ==
=== NCAA Division II tournament results ===
The Cougars made four appearances in the NCAA Division II women's basketball tournament. They had a combined record of 1–4.

Year	Round	Opponent	Result
1998	First round	Michigan Tech	L, 47–60
1999	First round Regional semifinals	Northern Michigan; Michigan Tech	W, 67–61; L, 73–87
2001	First round	Northern Michigan	L, 58–65
2007	First round	Drury	L, 71–76
