= Abilene Christian Wildcats women's basketball =

College basketball team in Abilene, Texas, United States

2026–27 Abilene Christian Wildcats women's basketball team
- University: Abilene Christian University
- Head coach: Julie Goodenough (15th season)
- Location: Abilene, Texas
- Arena: Moody Coliseum (capacity: 4,600)
- Conference: UAC
- Nickname: Wildcats
- Colors: Purple and white
- Student section: Wildcat Reign

NCAA Division I tournament Final Four
- Division II: 1996
Other NCAA Division I tournament results
Elite Eight	Division II: 1996
Sweet Sixteen	Division II: 1985, 1996, 1998
Appearances	Division II: 1985, 1988, 1989, 1995, 1996, 1997, 1998 1999, 2005, 2009, 2013; Division I: 2019

AIAW tournament quarterfinals
- Division II: 1981
Other AIAW tournament results
Appearances	Division II: 1981

Conference tournament champions
- Lone Star: 1983, 1985, 1986, 1993, 1996, 1998, 1999; Southland: 2019

Conference regular-season champions
- Lone Star: 1998, 1999; Southland: 2016, 2017

The Abilene Christian Wildcats women's basketball team represents Abilene Christian University (ACU) in Abilene, Texas. ACU joined the United Athletic Conference on July 1, 2021, after eight seasons in the Southland Conference. The Wildcats are currently coached by Julie Goodenough.

== Postseason ==
=== NCAA Division I ===
The Wildcats have appeared in the NCAA Division I women's basketball tournament once. They have a combined record of 0–1.

Year	Seed	Round	Opponent	Result
2019	#16	First round	#1 Baylor	L 38–95

=== WNIT ===
The Wildcats have made two appearances in the Women's National Invitation Tournament. They have a combined record of 1–2.

Year	Round	Opponent	Result
2016	Round 1	UTEP	L 66–62
2017	Round 1	Oklahoma State	W 66–56
2017	Round 2	SMU	L 59–52

=== NCAA Division II ===
The Wildcats made eleven appearances in the NCAA Division II women's basketball tournament. They had a combined record of 9–11.

Year	Round	Opponent	Result
1985	First round Regional Finals	Air Force; Central Missouri State	W 82–61; L 57–76
1988	First round	Central Missouri State	L 58–70
1989	First round	Central Missouri State	L 73–88
1995	First round Regional semifinals	Pittsburg State; Missouri Western State	W 99–93; L 71–79
1996	Regional semifinals Regional Finals; Elite Eight; Final Four; Third Place	Nebraska–Kearney; West Texas A&M; Northern Michigan; Shippensburg; Delta State	W 81–58; W 66–39; W 81–76; L 84–81; W 83–65
1997	First round Regional semifinals	Pittsburg State; Missouri Western State	W 92–78; L 71–75
1998	First round Regional semifinals Regional Finals	Southwest Baptist; Missouri Western State; Emporia State	W 92–82; W 86–83 (3OT); L 64–95
1999	First round	Truman State	L 79–94
2005	First round	Drury	L 75–112
2009	First round	West Texas A&M	L 53–78
2013	First round	UT Permian Basin	L 68–70

=== AIAW College Division ===
The Wildcats made one appearance in the Division II level of the AIAW women's basketball tournament, with a combined record of 1–1.

Year	Round	Opponent	Result
1981	First round Quarterfinals	Springfield; Lenoir-Rhyne	W 92–57; L 75–88
