= West Florida Argonauts women's basketball =

2026–27 West Florida Argonauts women's basketball team
- University: University of West Florida
- Head coach: Stephanie Lawrence Yelton (15th season)
- Location: Pensacola, Florida
- Arena: UWF Field House (capacity: 1,500)
- Conference: Atlantic Sun
- Nickname: Argonauts
- Colors: Royal blue and Kelly green

NCAA Division II tournament appearances
- 1998, 2006, 2014, 2015, 2017, 2019, 2025

Conference tournament champions
- Gulf South: 2014

The West Florida Argonauts women's basketball team represents the University of West Florida, located in Pensacola, Florida, in NCAA intercollegiate women's basketball competition. The Argonauts will join the NCAA Division I ASUN Conference on July 1, 2026, after 32 seasons in the Division II Gulf South Conference.

Due to the NCAA's policy on reclassifying programs, the Argonauts will not be eligible to compete in the NCAA tournament or the WNIT until the 2029–30 season.

The team is currently led by Stephanie Lawrence Yelton and play their home games at UWF Field House.

== Postseason results ==
=== NCAA Division II tournament ===
The Argonauts made seven appearances in the NCAA Division II tournament. Their combined record was 7–7 with one Elite Eight appearance.

Year	Round	Opponent	Result
1998	First Round; Regional Semifinals	Albany State; Arkansas Tech	W, 70–64; L, 53–75
2006	First Round; Regional Semifinals	Fort Valley State; Henderson State	W, 65–64; L, 62–68
2014	First Round	Tampa	L, 62–77
2015	First Round; Regional Semifinals	Benedict; Union (TN)	W, 78–58; L, 66–75
2017	First Round; Regional Semifinals; Regional Finals; Elite Eight	Nova Southeastern; Benedict; Rollins; Cal Baptist	W, 66–57; W, 74–51; W, 72–62; L, 69–77
2019	First Round; Regional Semifinals	Eckerd; Nova Southeastern	W, 78–50; L, 50–78
2025	First Round	Embry–Riddle (FL)	L, 56–70

== See also ==
- West Florida Argonauts men's basketball
