= Northern Kentucky Norse women's basketball =

American college basketball program

Northern Kentucky Norse
2026–27 Northern Kentucky Norse women's basketball team
- University: Northern Kentucky University
- Head coach: Jeff Hans (3rd season)
- Location: Highland Heights, Kentucky
- Arena: Truist Arena (capacity: 9,200)
- Conference: Horizon League
- Nickname: Norse
- Colors: Black, gold, and white

NCAA Division II tournament champions
- 2000, 2008
Other NCAA Division II tournament results
Runner-up	2003
Final Four	1987, 1999, 2000, 2003, 2008
Elite Eight	1987, 1999, 2000, 2002, 2003, 2008
Sweet Sixteen	1987, 1999, 2000, 2002, 2003, 2008
Appearances	1982, 1985, 1986, 1987, 1988, 1989, 1991, 1992, 1994, 1999, 2000, 2001, 2002, 2003, 2004, 2006, 2007, 2008, 2009, 2010, 2012

Conference tournament champions
- GLVC: 1999, 2000, 2006, 2009

Conference regular-season champions
- GLVC: 1986, 1987, 1988, 1991, 1999, 2000, 2002

Uniforms
Home	Away	Alternate

The Northern Kentucky Norse women's basketball team represents Northern Kentucky University in Highland Heights, Kentucky, United States.

== History ==
The Norse began play in 1974. From 1985 to 2012, they played in the Great Lakes Valley Conference. From 2012 to 2015, they played in the Atlantic Sun Conference, now known as the ASUN Conference, before joining the Horizon League. As of the end of the 2015–16 season, they have an all-time record of 880–361. In 2000, the Norse won the NCAA Women's Division II Basketball Championship in overtime 71–62 over North Dakota State. This was the first title in the history of the school. In 2003, they finished as runner-up to South Dakota State 65–50. In 2008, the Norse beat South Dakota 63–58 to win their second championship. In their first season in Division I (2012–13), they finished 15–13, but they were invited to the Women's Basketball Invitational. The following year, they went to the second round of the WBI. They also made the WBI in 2016.

== Postseason results ==
The Norse had a 27–18 record from twenty NCAA Tournament appearances at the Division II level.

=== NCAA Division II tournament results ===
Year	Round	Opponent	Result
1982	First round	Oakland	L, 75–77
1985	Regional Finals; Elite Eight	Atlanta; Central Missouri State	W, 81–69; L, 63–79
1986	First round	Bellarmine	L, 52–69
1987	Regional Finals; Elite Eight; Final Four	Wright State; West Texas State; New Haven	W, 74–63; W, 64–55; L, 74–77 (OT)
1988	First round	Lake Superior State	L, 76–77 (2OT)
1989	First round	Oakland	L, 93–95 (OT)
1991	First round	Northern Michigan	L, 63–67
1992	First round	Northern Michigan	L, 69–73
1999	Regional semifinals Regional Finals; Elite Eight; Final Four	Grand Valley State; Michigan Tech; Indiana (PA); Arkansas Tech	W, 85–67; W, 65–63; W, 75–67; L, 57–62
2000	Regional semifinals Regional Finals; Elite Eight; Final Four; National Championship	Michigan Tech; Northern Michigan; Saint Rose; Western Washington; North Dakota State	W, 60–59; W, 77–70; W, 60–50; W, 80–74; W, 71–62 (OT)
2001	First round	Gannon	L, 64–73
2002	First round Regional semifinals Regional Finals; Elite Eight	Northern Michigan; Lake Superior State; Southern Indiana; South Dakota State	W, 73–60; W, 71–62; W, 69–66; L, 67–68
2003	First round Regional semifinals Regional Finals; Elite Eight; Final Four; National Championship	Grand Valley State; Indianapolis; Quincy; Washburn; California (PA); South Dakota State	W, 69–63; W, 66–57; W, 64–61; W, 65–63; W, 45–43; L, 50–65
2004	First round	Quincy	L, 51–49
2006	First round Second Round	Michigan Tech; Grand Valley State	W, 67–66; L, 70–91
2007	First round	Ferris State	L, 69–70
2008	First round Second Round; Third round Elite Eight; Final Four; National Championship	Indianapolis; Drury; Missouri–Rolla; Wingate; Alaska Anchorage; South Dakota	W, 55–54; W, 84–65; W, 60–52; W, 78–65; W, 57–54; W, 63–58
2009	First round Second Round	Grand Valley State; Michigan Tech	W, 66–57; L, 53–76
2010	First round	Michigan Tech	L, 49–69
2012	First round	Quincy	L, 65–75
