= Bellarmine Knights women's basketball =

2026–27 Bellarmine Knights women's basketball team
- University: Bellarmine University
- First season: 1971; 55 years ago
- Head coach: Monique Reid (2nd season)
- Location: Louisville, Kentucky
- Arena: Knights Hall (capacity: 2,196)
- Conference: ASUN
- Nickname: Knights
- Colors: Scarlet and silver

NCAA Division I tournament Final Four
- Division II: 1994
Other NCAA Division I tournament results
Elite Eight	Division II: 1986, 1990, 1991, 1994
Sweet Sixteen	Division II: 1986, 1990, 1991, 1994, 1996
Appearances	Division II: 1986, 1987, 1990, 1991, 1993, 1994, 1996, 1997, 1999, 2003, 2004, 2005, 2007, 2008, 2016

The Bellarmine Knights women's basketball team represents Bellarmine University, located in Louisville, Kentucky, United States, in NCAA Division I as a member of the Atlantic Sun Conference (ASUN).

The Knights were members of the Division II Great Lakes Valley Conference from 1982 to 2020 before the move to Division I during the 2020–21 season.

Bellarmine returned home games to its campus at Knights Hall for 2024–25 after playing the previous four seasons at Freedom Hall on the grounds of the Kentucky Exposition Center in Louisville.

== Postseason ==
=== NCAA Division II tournament results ===
The Knights made fifteen appearances in the NCAA Division II women's basketball tournament. They had a combined record of 11–16.

Year	Round	Opponent	Result
1986	First round Regional finals Elite Eight	Northern Kentucky; Lake Superior State; Cal Poly Pomona	W, 69–52; W, 67–54; L, 49–83
1987	First round	Wright State	L, 67–80
1990	First round Regional finals Elite Eight	Pace; Florida Atlantic; Bentley	W, 71–60; W, 62–55; L, 69–74
1991	Regional finals Elite Eight	Northern Michigan; North Dakota State	W, 78–70; L, 64–87
1993	First round	Michigan Tech	L, 73–92
1994	First round Regional finals Elite Eight; Final Four; Third Place	Michigan Tech; Lake Superior State; Norfolk State; Cal State San Bernardino; North Alabama	W, 54–49; W, 77–74; W, 92–80; L, 55–77; L, 75–79
1996	Regional semifinals Regional finals	Southern Indiana; Northern Michigan	W, 89–80; L, 55–84
1997	First round	Michigan Tech	L, 80–83 (OT)
1999	First round	Grand Valley State	L, 57–70
2003	First round Second Round	Hillsdale; Quincy	W, 72–71; L, 93–101
2004	First round	Indianapolis	L, 67–79
2005	First round	Lake Superior State	L, 75–87
2007	First round	Lewis	L, 62–82
2008	First round	Drury	L, 70–80
2016	Regional Quarterfinals	Saginaw Valley	L, 58–69
