= Cal State Northridge Matadors women's basketball =

Women's college basketball team

Cal State Northridge Matadors
2025–26 Cal State Northridge Matadors women's basketball team
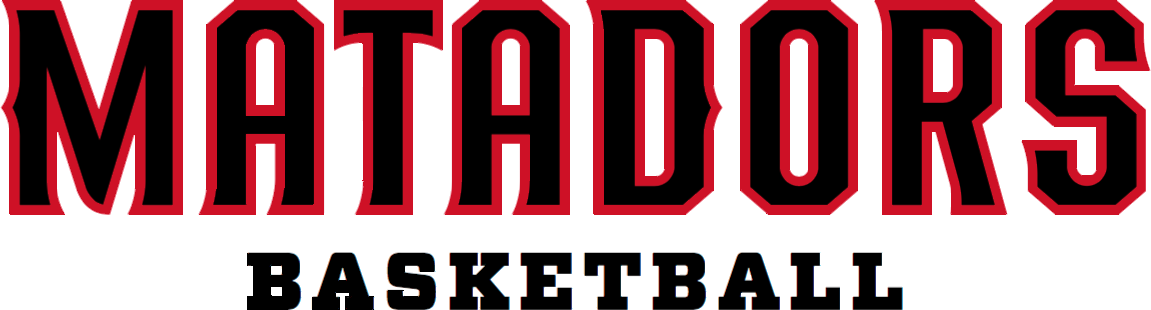
- University: California State University, Northridge
- Head coach: Angie Ned (2nd season)
- Conference: Big West
- Location: Northridge, California
- Arena: Premier America Credit Union Arena (capacity: 2,400)
- Nickname: Matadors
- Colors: Red, white, and black

Uniforms
Home	Away

NCAA tournament appearances
- 1986*, 1989*, 1999, 2014, 2015, 2018

Conference tournament champions
- 1999 (Big Sky); 2014, 2015, 2018
- * Division II

The Cal State Northridge Matadors women's basketball team is the women's college basketball program representing California State University, Northridge. The team currently competes in the Big West Conference of the NCAA Division I.

== History ==
As of the end of the 2015–16 season, the Matadors have an all-time record of 461–687. They previously played in the Big Sky Conference until 2001. They have made the NCAA tournament three times, losing each time in the first round.

== NCAA Tournament appearances ==
=== NCAA Division I tournament results ===
The Matadors have made four appearances in the NCAA Division I women's basketball tournament. They have a combined record of 0–4.

Year	Seed	Round	Opponent	Result
1999	#15	First Round	#2 Colorado State	L 59–71
2014	#16	First Round	#1 South Carolina	L 58–73
2015	#13	First Round	#4 Stanford	L 60–73
2018	#16	First Round	#1 Notre Dame	L 81–99

=== NCAA Division II tournament results ===
The Matadors made two appearances in the NCAA Division II women's basketball tournament. They had a combined record of 2–2.

Year	Round	Opponent	Result
1986	First Round; Regional Finals	UC Davis; Cal Poly Pomona	W 68–57; L 46–66
1989	First Round; Regional Finals	Florida Atlantic; Cal Poly Pomona	W 68–54; L 82–83 (OT)
