= Cal State Bakersfield Roadrunners women's basketball =

2026–27 Cal State Bakersfield Roadrunners women's basketball team
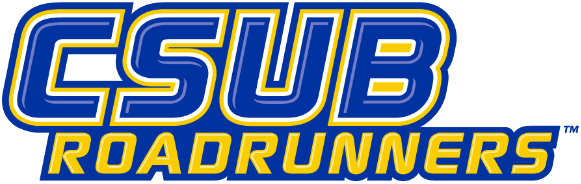
- University: California State University, Bakersfield
- Head coach: Ray Alvarado (1st season)
- Location: Bakersfield, California
- Arena: Icardo Center (capacity: 3,500)
- Conference: Big West Conference
- Nickname: Roadrunners
- Colors: Blue and gold

NCAA Division I tournament Elite Eight
- 2003*
Other NCAA Division I tournament results
Sweet Sixteen	2003*
Appearances	2001*, 2002*, 2003*, 2004*, 2005*, 2006* *at Division II level

Conference regular-season champions
- 2003, 2004 (CCAA)

The Cal State Bakersfield Roadrunners women's basketball team represents California State University, Bakersfield in Bakersfield, California, United States. They compete in the Big West Conference.

== History ==
Cal State Bakersfield began play in 2000. As of the end of the 2015–16 season the Roadrunners have an all-time record of 317–171. They were a member of the California Collegiate Athletic Association from 2000 to 2006 before joining the WAC in 2013. They have never made the NCAA Division I Tournament, only making appearances in the Division II Tournament (as of 2017) in 2001, 2002, 2003, 2004, 2005 and 2006. The Roadrunners played in the Women's Basketball Invitational in 2010 and 2011, finishing runner up in 2011. They made the WNIT in 2014 and 2015.

== Postseason ==
=== NCAA Division II tournament results ===
The Roadrunners made six appearances in the NCAA Division II women's basketball tournament. They had a combined record of 6–6.

Year	Round	Opponent	Result
2001	First round	Alaska	L, 75–86
2002	First round Second Round	Seattle Pacific; Cal Poly Pomona	W 96–84; L 61–65
2003	First round Regional semifinals Regional Finals; Elite Eight	Stanislaus State; Northwest Nazarene; Seattle Pacific; South Dakota State	W 116–106 (OT); W 103–84; W 85–80; L 62–83
2004	First round Second Round	Grand Canyon; Cal Poly Pomona	W 86–61; L 84–87
2005	First round	Saint Martin's	L 65–73
2006	First round Second Round	Cal State Los Angeles; Chico State	W 82–77; L 80–83

== See also ==
- 2013–14 Cal State Bakersfield Roadrunners women's basketball team
- 2015–16 Cal State Bakersfield Roadrunners women's basketball team
- Cal State Bakersfield Roadrunners men's basketball
