= 1989 NCAA Division II women's basketball tournament =

1989 women's basketball tournament

- Teams: 32
- Finals site: , Cleveland, Mississippi
- Champions: Delta State Lady Statesmen (1st title)
- Runner-up: Cal Poly Pomona Broncos (6th title game)
- Third place: Bentley Falcons (1st Final Four)
- Fourth place: Central Missouri State Jennies (4th Final Four)
- Winning coach: Lloyd Clark (1st title)
- MOP: Pam Lockett (Delta State)

The 1989 NCAA Division II women's basketball tournament was the eighth annual tournament hosted by the NCAA to determine the national champion of Division II women's collegiate basketball in the United States.

Delta State defeated Cal Poly Pomona in the championship game, 88–58, claiming the Lady Statesmen's first NCAA Division II national title.

The championship rounds were contested in Cleveland, Mississippi.

A third-place game returned to the tournament this year after a six-year absence.

== Regionals ==
=== East - Bloomsburg, Pennsylvania ===
Location: E.H. Nelson Fieldhouse Host: Bloomsburg State College of Pennsylvania

Regional semifinals Round of 32; March 10
Bloomsburg	63
Pace	61
Lock Haven	69
Philadelphia Textile	63

Regional final Sweet 16; March 11
Bloomsburg	64
Lock Haven	58

=== Northeast - New Haven, Connecticut ===
Location: North Campus Gymnasium Host: University of New Haven

Regional semifinals Round of 32; March 10
New Haven	94
Bryant	71
Bentley	88
Bridgeport	68

Regional final Sweet 16; March 11
New Haven	71
Bentley	76

=== West - Pomona, California ===
Location: Kellogg Gym Host: California State Polytechnic University, Pomona

Regional semifinals Round of 32; March 10
Cal Poly Pomona	82
Cal State Hayward	69
Cal State Northridge	68
Florida Atlantic	54

Regional final Sweet 16; March 11
Cal Poly Pomona	83*
Cal State Northridge	82

=== Great Lakes - Rochester, Michigan ===
Location: Lepley Sports Center Host: Oakland University

Regional semifinals Round of 32; March 10
Oakland	95*
Northern Kentucky	93
St. Joseph's (IN)	84
Northern Michigan	69

Regional final Sweet 16; March 11
Oakland	59
St. Joseph's (IN)	80

=== South - Cleveland, Mississippi ===
Location: Walter Sillers Coliseum Host: Delta State University

Regional semifinals Round of 32; March 10
Jacksonville State	84
West Georgia	81
Delta State	69
Albany State	36

Regional final Sweet 16; March 11
Jacksonville State	48
Delta State	64

=== South Atlantic - Hampton, Virginia ===
Location: Holland Hall Host: Hampton University

Regional semifinals Round of 32; March 10
Virginia State	101
Hampton	88
District of Columbia	89
Shaw	56

Regional final Sweet 16; March 11
Virginia State	56
District of Columbia	83

=== North Central - Fargo, North Dakota ===
Location: Bison Sports Arena Host: North Dakota State University

Regional semifinals Round of 32; March 10
St. Cloud State	91*
Alaska Anchorage	89
North Dakota State	72*
South Dakota	71

Regional final Sweet 16; March 11
St. Cloud State	87
North Dakota State	80

=== South Central - Warrensburg, Missouri ===
Location: CMSU Fieldhouse Host: Central Missouri State University

Regional semifinals Round of 32; March 10
West Texas State	83**
Southeast Missouri State	70
Central Missouri State	88
Abilene Christian	73

Regional final Sweet 16; March 11
West Texas State	62
Central Missouri State	63

== National Finals - Cleveland, Mississippi ==
Final Four Location: Walter Sillers Coliseum Host: Delta State University

National quarterfinals Elite Eight; See below
Bloomsburg	68
Bentley	73
March 18 - Waltham, Mass. March 17 - Pomona, California
Cal Poly Pomona	72
St. Joseph's (IN)	63
Delta State	85
District of Columbia	53
March 17 - Cleveland, Mississippi; March 17 - St. Cloud, Minnesota
St. Cloud State	71
Central Missouri State	87

National semifinals Final Four; March 24
Bentley	83
Cal Poly Pomona	84*
Delta State	94
Central Missouri State	73

National championship March 25
Cal Poly Pomona	58
Delta State	88
Third place
Bentley	83
Central Missouri State	81

== All-tournament team ==
- Pam Lockett, Delta State
- Jo Lynn Davis, Delta State
- Niki Bracken, Cal Poly Pomona
- Lori Bender, Bentley
- Tammy Wilson, Central Missouri State

== See also ==
- 1989 NCAA Division II men's basketball tournament
- 1989 NCAA Division I women's basketball tournament
- 1989 NCAA Division III women's basketball tournament
- 1989 NAIA women's basketball tournament
