= North Dakota Fighting Hawks women's basketball =

American college basketball team

2025–26 North Dakota Fighting Hawks women's basketball team
- University: University of North Dakota
- Head coach: Dennis Hutter (1st season)
- Location: Grand Forks, North Dakota
- Arena: Betty Engelstad Sioux Center (capacity: 3,300)
- Conference: Summit League
- Nickname: Fighting Hawks
- Colors: Kelly green and white

NCAA Division I tournament champions
- Division II; 1997, 1998, 1999
Other NCAA Division I tournament results
Runner-up	Division II; 2001
Final Four	Division II; 1997, 1998, 1999, 2001
Elite Eight	Division II; 1990, 1992, 1997, 1998, 1999, 2001, 2007
Appearances	Division II; 1984, 1985, 1988, 1990, 1991, 1992, 1993, 1994, 1995, 1996, 1997, 1998, 1999, 2000, 2001, 2002, 2003, 2004, 2005, 2006, 2007, 2008 Division I 2014

AIAW tournament appearances
- Division II; 1976, 1977, 1980

Conference tournament champions
- 2001, 2002, 2003, 2004, 2005, 2006, 2007, 2014

Conference regular-season champions
- 1990, 1991, 1993, 1994, 1998, 1999, 2001, 2002, 2005, 2006, 2007, 2010, 2014

Uniforms
Home	Away

The North Dakota Fighting Hawks women's basketball team is part of the athletic program at the University of North Dakota in Grand Forks, North Dakota. It is a member of the NCAA Division I Summit League; the 2019–20 season was their first in the new conference. Previously they played in Division I's Big Sky Conference and Division I's Great West Conference.

The first year the university fielded a women's team was in 1894. Since then, the women's team has appeared in 23 NCAA tournaments. The first Division I appearance was in 2014. With the exception of 1986, 1987, and 1989, the basketball team appeared in every NCAA Division II tournament from 1984 to 2007. Three of the Division II tournament appearances resulted in three consecutive Division II National Championships (1997, 1998, 1999).

== Head coaches ==
#	Name	Term
1	Dee Watson	1974–1979
2	Shirlan Mosley	1979–1981
3	Gary Schwartz	1982–1984
4	Martha Hutchinson	1985–1986
5	Gene Roebuck	1987–2011
6	Travis Brewster	2012–2020
7	Mallory Bernhard	2020–2025
8	Dennis Hutter	2025–present

== Conference championships ==
North Central Conference

- Regular Season Champion (11 times): 1989–90, 1990–91, 1992–93, 1993–94, 1997–98, 1998–99, 2000–01, 2001–02, 2004–05, 2005–06, 2006–07
- Conference tournament champion (7 times): 2001, 2002, 2003, 2004, 2005, 2006, 2007

Great West Conference

- Regular Season Champion (2 times): 2009–10, 2011–12
- Conference tournament champion (1 time): 2012

Big Sky Conference

- Regular Season Champion (2 times): 2013–14, 2016–17
- Conference tournament champion: (1 time): 2014

== NCAA Division II championships ==
Association	Division	Sport	Year	Score	Opponent
NCAA	Division II	Basketball	1997	94–78	Southern Indiana
NCAA	Division II	Basketball	1998	92–76	Emporia State
NCAA	Division II	Basketball	1999	80–63	Arkansas Tech

NCAA Division II runner-up team: 2001

== Postseason ==
=== NCAA Division I tournament results ===
The Fighting Hawks have made one appearance in the NCAA Division I women's basketball tournament. They have a combined record of 0–1.

Year	Seed	Round	Opponent	Result
2014	#14	First round	#3 Texas A&M	L 55−70

=== NCAA Division II tournament results ===
The Fighting Hawks, then known as the Fighting Sioux, made twenty-two appearances in the NCAA Division II women's basketball tournament. They had a combined record of 36–19.

Year	Round	Opponent	Result
1984	First round	South Dakota	L, 48–49
1985	First round	St. Cloud State	L, 46–66
1988	First round	South Dakota State	L, 60–76
1990	First round Regional finals Elite Eight	Augustana (SD); North Dakota State; Cal Poly Pomona	W, 93–78; W, 90–58; L, 64–67
1991	First round Regional finals	Florida Atlantic; North Dakota State	W, 94–78; L, 59–81
1992	First round Regional finals Elite Eight	Bloomsburg; Norfolk State; Delta State	W, 79–50; W, 63–48; L, 55–63
1993	First round	Augustana (SD)	L, 67–79
1994	First round	South Dakota State	L, 51–61
1995	First round	South Dakota State	L, 75–78
1996	First round Regional semifinals Regional finals	Metro State; South Dakota State; North Dakota State	W, 71–47; W, 68–55; L, 77–89
1997	Regional semifinals Regional finals Elite Eight; Final Four; National Championship	Northern State; North Dakota State; Edinboro; Bentley; Southern Indiana	W, 88–76; W, 73–66; W, 81–46; W, 70–48; W, 94–78
1998	Regional semifinals Regional finals Elite Eight; Final Four; National Championship	Northern Colorado; Nebraska–Kearney; Bentley; Northern Michigan; Emporia State	W, 96–68; W, 79–68; W, 71–56; W, 79–69; W, 92–76
1999	Regional semifinals Regional finals Elite Eight; Final Four; National Championship	Augustana (SD); North Dakota State; Kennesaw State; Emporia State; Arkansas Tech	W, 84–62; W, 83–60; W, 96–69; W, 87–81; W,80–63
2000	Regional semifinals Regional finals	Northern Colorado; North Dakota State	W, 82–67; L, 72–92
2001	Regional semifinals Regional finals Elite Eight; Final Four; National Championship	St. Cloud State; Minnesota–Duluth; Texas A&M–Kingsville; Shippensburg; Cal Poly Pomona	W, 76–63; W, 71–56; W, 88–60; W, 76–67; L, 80–87 (OT)
2002	Regional semifinals	Southwest Minnesota State	L, 57–66
2003	First round Second Round	Minnesota–Duluth; South Dakota State	W, 70–63; L, 56–77
2004	First round Second Round; Third round	Fort Lewis; North Dakota State; South Dakota State	W, 53–51; W, 66–65; L, 70–72 (OT)
2005	First round Second Round	Fort Hays State; Concordia-St. Paul	W, 87–56; L, 76–78
2006	First round Second Round; Third round	CSU Pueblo; Northern State; St. Cloud State	W, 92–69; W, 90–58; L, 69–75
2007	First round Second Round; Third round Elite Eight	Minnesota State–Moorhead; Regis; Nebraska–Kearney; Florida Gulf Coast	W, 98–66; W, 78–63; W, 108–75; L, 64–83
2008	First round	Wayne State (NE)	L, 78–85

== Season–by–season results ==
Record table
Season	Coach	Overall	Conference	Standing	Postseason
Dee Watson (Minn–Kota Conference) (1974–1979)
1974–75	Dee Watson	3–14	—	—	
1975–76	Dee Watson	17–9	—	—	
1976–77	Dee Watson	16–15	—	—	
1977–78	Dee Watson	13–16	—	—	
1978–79	Dee Watson	5–18	—	—	
Dee Watson:		54–72 (.429)			
Shirlan Mosley (no conference) (1979–1982)
1979–80	Shirlan Mosley	19–8	—	—	SDAIAW Division II Tournament
1980–81	Shirlan Mosley	15–12	—	—	
1981–82	Shirlan Mosley	9–15	—	—	
Shirlan Mosley:		43–35 (.551)			
Gary Schwartz (North Central Conference) (1982–1985)
1982–83	Gary Schwartz	15–9	6—4	2nd	
1983–84	Gary Schwartz	22–7	8—4	T—2nd	NCAA Division II First Round
1984–85	Gary Schwartz	23–6	10—4	T—2nd	NCAA Division II First Round
Gary Schwartz:		60–22 (.732)	24–12 (.667)		
Martha Hutchinson (North Central Conference) (1985–1987)
1985–86	Martha Hutchinson	12–15	5—9	6th	
1986–87	Martha Hutchinson	7–20	2—12	8th	
Martha Hutchinson:		19–35 (.352)	7–21 (.250)		
Gene Roebuck (North Central Conference) (1987–2008)
1987–88	Gene Roebuck	22–6	9—5	3rd	NCAA Division II First Round
1988–89	Gene Roebuck	19–9	6—8	5th	
1989–90	Gene Roebuck	27–4	16—2	1st	NCAA Division II Elite Eight
1990–91	Gene Roebuck	28–2	17—1	1st	NCAA Division II Regional Final
1991–92	Gene Roebuck	24–7	13—5	3rd	NCAA Division II Elite Eight
1992–93	Gene Roebuck	23–5	16—2	T—1st	NCAA Division II First Round
1993–94	Gene Roebuck	26–2	18—0	1st	NCAA Division II Regional Semifinals
1994–95	Gene Roebuck	23–5	15—3	2nd	NCAA Division II Regional Semifinals
1995–96	Gene Roebuck	26–6	14—4	3rd	NCAA Division II Regional Finals
1996–97	Gene Roebuck	28–4	14—4	2nd	NCAA Division II Champions
1997–98	Gene Roebuck	31–1	18—0	1st	NCAA Division II Champions
1998–99	Gene Roebuck	31–1	17—1	1st	NCAA Division II Champions
1999–00	Gene Roebuck	25–5	15—3	2nd	NCAA Division II Regional Finals
2000–01	Gene Roebuck	29–4	15—3	1st	NCAA Division II Runner-up
2001–02	Gene Roebuck	24–5	14—4	1st	NCAA Division II Regional Semifinals
2002–03	Gene Roebuck	26–6	12—4	T—3rd	NCAA Division II Regional Semifinals
2003–04	Gene Roebuck	27–6	12—4	3rd	NCAA Division II Regional Finals
2004–05	Gene Roebuck	25–6	10—2	1st	NCAA Division II Regional Semifinals
2005–06	Gene Roebuck	34–1	12—0	1st	NCAA Division II Regional Finals
2006–07	Gene Roebuck	32–4	10—2	1st	NCAA Division II Elite Eight
2007–08	Gene Roebuck	27–4	10—2	2nd	NCAA Division II First Round
Gene Roebuck (Division I Independents) (2008–2009)
2008–09	Gene Roebuck	18–11	—	—	
Gene Roebuck (Great West Conference) (2009–2012)
2009–10	Gene Roebuck	17–14	11—1	1st	
2010–11	Gene Roebuck	15–16	8—4	2nd	
2011–12	Gene Roebuck	21–11	9—1	1st	WBI First Round
Gene Roebuck:		628–145 (.812)	300–65 (.822)		
Travis Brewster (Big Sky Conference) (2012–2018)
2012–13	Travis Brewster	11–18	6—14	T–9th	
2013–14	Travis Brewster	22–10	15—5	T–1st	NCAA First Round
2014–15	Travis Brewster	17–15	9—9	T–5th	WBI First Round
2015–16	Travis Brewster	19–14	13—5	T–2nd	WBI Quarterfinals
2016–17	Travis Brewster	20–11	15—3	T–1st	WNIT First Round
2017–18	Travis Brewster	12–18	5—13	T–9th	
Travis Brewster (Summit League) (2018–2020)
2018–19	Travis Brewster	12–19	6—10	6th	
2019–20	Travis Brewster	15–15	6—10	7th	
Travis Brewster:		128–120 (.516)	75–69 (.521)		
Mallory Bernhard (Summit League) (2020–2025)
2020–21	Mallory Bernhard	2–19	2—13	9th	
2021–22	Mallory Bernhard	15–15	9—9	5th	
2022–23	Mallory Bernhard	19–13	11—7	3rd	WBI 6th Place
2023–24	Mallory Bernhard	9-21	5-11	6th	
2024–25	Mallory Bernhard	12-19	6-10	5th	
Mallory Bernhard:		57–87 (.396)	36–47 (.434)		
Dennis Hutter (Summit League) (2025–present)
2025-26	Dennis Hutter	7-24	3-13	9th	
Dennis Hutter:		7–24 (.226)	3–13 (.188)		
Total:		996–542 (.648)			
National champion Postseason invitational champion Conference regular season champion Conference regular season and conference tournament champion Division regular season champion Division regular season and conference tournament champion Conference tournament champion

== Rivalry ==
North Dakota victories	North Dakota State victories	Tie games

No.	Date	Location	Winning team	Losing team	Score
1	1/10/1975	Grand Forks	North Dakota	North Dakota State	61–44
2	1/22/1975	Fargo	North Dakota	North Dakota State	62–47
3	2/14/1975	Grand Forks	North Dakota	North Dakota State	43–40
4	2/21/1975	Neutral Site	North Dakota	North Dakota State	63–52
5	1/08/1977	Fargo	North Dakota	North Dakota State	73–49
6	2/09/1977	Grand Forks	North Dakota	North Dakota State	57–44
7	12/17/1977	Fargo	North Dakota	North Dakota State	71–52
8	1/04/1978	Fargo	North Dakota	North Dakota State	64–51
9	2/07/1978	Grand Forks	North Dakota	North Dakota State	66–56
10	1/13/1979	Fargo	North Dakota State	North Dakota	69–48
11	1/27/1979	Neutral Site	North Dakota	North Dakota State	58–52
12	1/22/1980	Grand Forks	North Dakota	North Dakota State	102–93 (OT)
13	2/09/1980	Neutral Site	North Dakota	North Dakota State	78–76
14	2/22/80	Fargo	North Dakota State	North Dakota	75–71 (OT)
15	1/05/1981	Fargo	North Dakota	North Dakota State	56–51
16	2/27/1981	Grand Forks	North Dakota State	North Dakota	68–64
17	1/28/1982	Grand Forks	North Dakota State	North Dakota	62–60
18	1/30/1982	Fargo	North Dakota State	North Dakota	69–53
19	2/25/1982	Neutral Site	North Dakota State	North Dakota	96–70
20	2/03/1983	Fargo	North Dakota	North Dakota State	65–62
21	2/05/1983	Grand Forks	North Dakota	North Dakota State	60–49
22	2/02/1984	Grand Forks	North Dakota	North Dakota State	80–58
23	2/04/1984	Fargo	North Dakota	North Dakota State	85–57
24	1/19/1985	Grand Forks	North Dakota	North Dakota State	66–60
25	2/16/1985	Fargo	North Dakota	North Dakota State	72–71
26	1/18/1986	Fargo	North Dakota State	North Dakota State	73–68
27	2/15/1986	Grand Forks	North Dakota State	North Dakota	62–61
28	1/17/1987	Grand Forks	North Dakota State	North Dakota State	86–73
29	2/14/1987	Fargo	North Dakota State	North Dakota State	92–69
30	1/23/1988	Fargo	North Dakota State	North Dakota State	77–70
31	2/21/1988	Fargo	North Dakota State	North Dakota	57–54
32	01/21/1989	Grand Forks	North Dakota	North Dakota State	80–66
33	02/18/1989	Fargo	North Dakota State	North Dakota	77–52
34	01/20/1990	Fargo	North Dakota State	North Dakota State	90–88
35	02/18/1990	Grand Forks	North Dakota	North Dakota State	96–75
36	03/10/1990	Grand Forks	North Dakota	North Dakota State	90–58
37	01/26/1991	Grand Forks	North Dakota State	North Dakota	86–75
38	02/23/1991	Fargo	North Dakota	North Dakota State	61–59
39	03/10/1991	Grand Forks	North Dakota State	North Dakota	81–59
40	01/24/1992	Fargo	North Dakota	North Dakota State	69–67
41	02/22/1992	Grand Forks	North Dakota State	North Dakota	58–57
42	01/22/1993	Fargo	North Dakota State	North Dakota	78–55
43	02/20/1993	Grand Forks	North Dakota	North Dakota State	62–56
44	01/21/1994	Grand Forks	North Dakota	North Dakota State	75–74 (OT)
45	02/18/1994	Fargo	North Dakota	North Dakota State	68–62
46	01/28/1995	Fargo	North Dakota State	North Dakota	75–62
47	02/24/1995	Grand Forks	North Dakota State	North Dakota	76–72
48	01/26/1996	Grand Forks	North Dakota State	North Dakota	76–72
49	02/23/1996	Fargo	North Dakota State	North Dakota	71–63
50	03/09/1996	Fargo	North Dakota State	North Dakota	89–77
51	12/29/1996	Fargo	North Dakota State	North Dakota	89–72
52	02/28/1997	Grand Forks	North Dakota State	North Dakota	64–61
53	03/09/1997	Fargo	North Dakota	North Dakota State	73–66
54	12/20/1997	Grand Forks	North Dakota	North Dakota State	91–67
55	02/27/1998	Fargo	North Dakota	North Dakota State	85–59
56	01/03/1999	Grand Forks	North Dakota	North Dakota State	95–83
57	01/30/1999	Fargo	North Dakota State	North Dakota	87–83
58	03/07/1999	Grand Forks	North Dakota	North Dakota State	83–60
59	01/09/2000	Fargo	North Dakota	North Dakota State	73–61
60	02/04/2000	Grand Forks	North Dakota State	North Dakota	75–63
61	03/12/2000	Fargo	North Dakota State	North Dakota	92–72
62	01/06/2001	Fargo	North Dakota	North Dakota State	70–61
63	02/02/2001	Grand Forks	North Dakota	North Dakota State	73–67
64	03/03/2001	Grand Forks	North Dakota	North Dakota State	76–59
65	01/04/2002	Grand Forks	North Dakota State	North Dakota State	75–59
66	02/01/2002	Fargo	North Dakota State	North Dakota	78–66
67	03/01/2002	Grand Forks	North Dakota	North Dakota State	81–60
68	01/18/2003	Grand Forks	North Dakota	North Dakota State	71–68
69	03/01/2003	Fargo	North Dakota State	North Dakota	91–84 (OT)
70	01/31/2004	Fargo	North Dakota State	North Dakota	76–73
71	02/07/2004	Grand Forks	North Dakota State	North Dakota	75–74
72	03/06/2004	Fargo	North Dakota	North Dakota State	80–71
73	03/13/2004	Neutral Site	North Dakota	North Dakota State	66–65
74	11/30/2012	Fargo	North Dakota	North Dakota State	73–63
75	12/14/2013	Grand Forks	North Dakota	North Dakota State	88–83
76	12/06/2014	Fargo	North Dakota	North Dakota State	90–87 (OT)
77	12/12/2015	Grand Forks	North Dakota	North Dakota State	71–54
78	12/10/2016	Fargo	North Dakota	North Dakota State	76–55
79	12/09/2017	Grand Forks	North Dakota	North Dakota State	76–68
80	01/20/2019	Fargo	North Dakota State	North Dakota	69–57
81	02/07/2019	Grand Forks	North Dakota	North Dakota	70–58
82	01/19/2020	Fargo	North Dakota State	North Dakota	92–82
83	02/23/2020	Grand Forks	North Dakota State	North Dakota	82–74
84	12/16/2020	Fargo	North Dakota State	North Dakota	74–67 (OT)
85	01/15/2021	Grand Forks	North Dakota State	North Dakota	64–60
86	01/16/2021	Grand Forks	North Dakota State	North Dakota	71–68 (OT)
87	12/22/2021	Grand Forks	North Dakota State	North Dakota	67–61
88	02/26/2022	Fargo	North Dakota State	North Dakota	81–64
89	12/31/2022	Fargo	North Dakota State	North Dakota	81–76
90	01/28/2023	Grand Forks	North Dakota	North Dakota State	82–73
91	02/03/2024	Grand Forks	North Dakota State	North Dakota	101–85
92	02/24/2024	Fargo	North Dakota State	North Dakota	107–80
93	01/25/2025	Fargo	North Dakota State	North Dakota	70–66
94	02/15/2025	Grand Forks	North Dakota	North Dakota State	65–60
95	02/15/2026	Grand Forks	North Dakota State	North Dakota	87–51
96	02/28/2026	Fargo	North Dakota State	North Dakota	95–70
Series: North Dakota leads 49–47

== North Dakota women's basketball statistical leaders ==
Career scoring
Rk	Player	Points	Seasons
1	Jennifer Crouse	2,285	1995–1999
2	Ashley Langen	2,078	2004–2008
3	Kacie Borowicz	2,034	2019–2024
4	Kierah Kimbrough	2,032	2005–2009
5	Sheri Kleinsasser	1,941	1991–1995
6	Kristi Boese	1,834	2002–2006
7	Becky Moen	1,762	1999–2003
8	Jenny Boll	1,651	1999–2003
9	Lexi Klabo	1,633	2015–2019
10	Tiffany Pudenz	1,622	1994–1998

Career rebounds
Rk	Player	Points	Seasons
1	Jennifer Crouse	1,145	1995-1999
2	Ashley Langen	1,135	2004–2008
3	Kristi Boese	955	2002–2006
	Kami Winger	955	1995–1999
5	Mia Lloyd	930	2012–2016
6	Kierah Kimbrough	925	2005–2009
7	Pam Solseth	906	1976–1980
8	Lexi Klabo	887	2015–2019
9	Laurie Bakke	780	1978–1982
10	Nadine VanDeKerchove	775	1987–1991

Career assists
Rk	Player	Points	Seasons
1	Jaime Pudenz	645	1996–2000
2	Tiffany Pudenz	545	1994–1998
3	Danye Guinn	499	2004–2009
	Amy Mahlum	475	2002–2006
5	Carissa Jahner	470	2003–2007
6	Christy Waldal	450	1992–1996
7	Kacie Borowicz	426	2019–2024
8	Durene Heisler	423	1987–1990
9	Kristie Boese	409	2002–2006
10	Beth Ihry	381	1989–1991

== Arenas ==
- Hyslop Sports Center, 1974–2003
- Betty Engelstad Sioux Center, 2004–present
