= Kennesaw State Owls women's basketball =

Kennesaw State Owls
2026–27 Kennesaw State Owls women's basketball team
- University: Kennesaw State University
- Head coach: Tianni Kelly (1st season)
- Location: Kennesaw, Georgia
- Arena: KSU Convocation Center (capacity: 4,600)
- Conference: Conference USA
- Nickname: Lady Owls
- Colors: Black and gold

NCAA Division I tournament Elite Eight
- 1997*, 1999*
Other NCAA Division I tournament results
Sweet Sixteen	1997*, 1999*
Appearances	1997*, 1999*, 2000*

Conference tournament champions
- 1997 (Peach Belt)

Conference regular-season champions
- 1997, 1999, 2000

Uniforms
Home	Away
- * at Division II level

The Kennesaw State Owls women's basketball team represents Kennesaw State University in the sport of College basketball. They are a mid-major team in NCAA Division I, and played their first season in Conference USA (CUSA) in 2024–25 after 19 seasons in the Atlantic Sun Conference. The Owls host their opponents at the KSU Convocation Center, nearby to their Kennesaw Campus.

== History ==
The Owls began play in 1982. They played in the National Association of Intercollegiate Athletics and Georgia Intercollegiate Athletics Conference from 1982 to 1994. In their time in the NAIA, they made the NAIA playoffs seven times while compiling an all-time record of 204–143. They transitioned from NAIA to Division II from 1992 to 1994. In their time in Division II, they made the Elite Eight in 1997 and 1999 along with an appearance in the second round in 2000, with an all-time record of 222–98. They were formerly a member of the Peach Belt Conference from 1994 to 2005. They joined Division I in 2005. As of the end of the 2015–16 season, they have an all-time record of 550–442, with a record of 123–201 in Division I play.

In 2014–15, the Owls had their most wins in their Division I program history, at 17. The Owls had a strong season behind their senior point guard, Kristina Wells.

== Division I era records ==
The Owls have been competing in Division I since the 2005–06 season.

Season	Wins	Losses	Winning Percentage
2005–06	5	22	.185
2006–07	13	16	.448
2007–08	16	12	.571
2008–09	15	14	.517
2009–10	11	19	.367
2010–11	9	21	.300
2011–12	14	17	.452
2012–13	7	24	.226
2013–14	6	24	.200
2014–15	17	13	.567
2015–16	11	19	.367
2016–17	10	20	.333
2017–18	7	19	.269
Overall	141	240	.370

== Postseason ==
=== NCAA Division II ===
The Owls made three appearances in the NCAA Division II women's basketball tournament. They had a combined record of 6–3.

Year	Round	Opponent	Result
1997	Regional semifinals Regional finals Elite Eight	Fayetteville State; Bowie State; Bentley	W, 99–65; W, 74–68; L, 48–55
1999	First round Regional semifinals Regional finals Elite Eight	Lander; Bowie State; Francis Marion; North Dakota	W, 69–39; W, 81–70; W, 76–72; L, 69–96
2000	First round Regional semifinals	Livingstone; Columbus State	W, 77–62; L, 72–82

=== NAIA Division I ===
The Owls made the NAIA Division I women's basketball tournament two times, with a combined record of 1–2.

Year	Seed	Round	Opponent	Result
1992	NR	First round Second Round	#16 Rosary (IL) #1 Simon Fraser	W, 94–90; L, 40–77
1993	NR	First round	#5 Central State (OH)	L, 69–83
