= North Dakota State Bison women's basketball =

Women's college basketball team

2025–26 North Dakota State Bison women's basketball team
- University: North Dakota State University
- Head coach: Jory Collins (8th season)
- Location: Fargo, North Dakota
- Arena: Scheels Center (capacity: 5,460)
- Conference: Summit League
- Nickname: Bison
- Colors: Green and yellow

NCAA Division I tournament champions
- Division II; 1991, 1993, 1994, 1995, 1996
Other NCAA Division I tournament results
Runner-up	Division II; 1986, 1992, 2000
Final Four	Division II; 1986, 1988, 1991, 1992, 1993, 1994, 1995, 1996, 2000
Elite Eight	Division II; 1986, 1988, 1991, 1992, 1993, 1994, 1995, 1996, 2000
Sweet Sixteen	Division II; 1986, 1988, 1991, 1992, 1993, 1994, 1995, 1996, 2000
Appearances	Division II; 1986, 1987, 1988, 1989, 1990, 1991, 1992, 1993, 1994, 1995, 1996, 1997, 1998, 1999, 2000, 2001, 2003, 2004

AIAW tournament Final Four
- Division II: 1982
Other AIAW tournament results
Appearances	Division II: 1979, 1982

Conference regular-season champions
- North Central Conference; 1987, 1988, 1992, 1993, 1995, 1997; Summit League; 2026

The North Dakota State Bison women's basketball team is part of the athletic program at North Dakota State University in Fargo, North Dakota, United States. They are members of NCAA Division I and the Summit League. The Bison head coach is Jory Collins in his 8th season.

== NCAA Division II Championships ==
Association	Division	Sport	Year	Score	Opponent
NCAA	Division II	Basketball	1991	81–74	Southeast Missouri State
NCAA	Division II	Basketball	1993	95–63	Delta State
NCAA	Division II	Basketball	1994	89–56	Cal State San Bernardino
NCAA	Division II	Basketball	1995	98–85	Portland State
NCAA	Division II	Basketball	1996	104–78	Shippensburg

NCAA Division II runner-up teams:

- 1986
- 1992
- 2000

== Postseason ==
=== WBIT ===
The Bison have made one appearance in the Women's Basketball Invitation Tournament (WBIT). Their record is 1–1.

Year	Round	Opponent	Result
2026	First round	Chattanooga	W 75–62
2026	Second round	Columbia	L 57–86

=== WNIT ===
The Bison have made three appearances in the Women's National Invitation Tournament (WNIT). Their record is 3–3.

Year	Round	Opponent	Result
2023	First round	at Oregon	L 57–96
2024	Second round	Montana	W 72–63
2024	Super 16	at Minnesota	L 65–69
2025	Second round	New Mexico State	W 68–65
2025	Super 16	Washington State	W 59–51
2025	Great 8	Troy	L 97–88^{OT}

=== NCAA Division II tournament results ===
The Bison made eighteen appearances in the NCAA Division II women's basketball tournament. They had a combined record of 47–13.

Year	Round	Opponent	Result
1986	First round Regional Finals; Elite Eight; Final Four; National Championship	Bryant; Mankato State; Central Missouri State; Philadelphia Textile; Cal Poly Pomona	W, 81–63; W, 67–62; W, 77–60; W, 77–61; L, 63–70
1987	Regional Finals; Elite Eight	St. Cloud State; Cal Poly Pomona	W, 67–65; L, 67–77
1988	First round Regional Finals; Elite Eight; Final Four	St. Cloud State; South Dakota State; St. Joseph's (IN); Hampton	W, 77–57; W, 91–77; W, 87–74; L, 63–72
1989	First round Regional Finals	South Dakota; St. Cloud State	W, 72–71 (OT); L, 80–87
1990	First round Regional Finals	St. Cloud State; North Dakota	W, 91–74; L, 58–90
1991	First round Regional Finals; Elite Eight; Final Four; National Championship	Augustana (SD); North Dakota; Bellarmine; Bentley; Southeast Missouri State	W, 90–89; W, 81–59; W, 87–64; W, 83–76; W, 81–74
1992	First round Regional Finals; Elite Eight; Final Four; National Championship	South Dakota State; Augustana (SD); Washburn; Portland State; Delta State	W, 92–58; W, 104–69; W, 79–51; W, 93–59; L, 63–65
1993	First round Regional Finals; Elite Eight; Final Four; National Championship	Denver; Augustana (SD); Cal Poly Pomona; Bentley; Delta State	W, 92–77; W, 91–82; W, 91–55; W, 79–57; W, 95–63
1994	First round Regional Finals; Elite Eight; Final Four; National Championship	Augustana (SD); South Dakota State; Missouri Western State; North Alabama; Cal State San Bernardino	W, 82–59; W, 82–52; W, 91–74; W, 123–56; W, 89–56
1995	First round Regional Finals; Elite Eight; Final Four; National Championship	Minnesota–Duluth; South Dakota State; Oakland; Missouri Western State; Portland State	W, 98–61; W, 82–68; W, 87–61; W, 74–67; W, 98–85
1996	First round Regional Finals; Elite Eight; Final Four; National Championship	Minnesota–Duluth; North Dakota; Portland State; Delta State; Shippensburg	W, 72–52; W, 89–77; W, 91–65; W, 93–72; W, 104–78
1997	Regional semifinals Regional Finals	Nebraska–Kearney; North Dakota	W, 76–65; L, 66–73
1998	First round	Northern State	L, 73–76
1999	Regional semifinals Regional Finals	Minnesota–Duluth; North Dakota	W, 61–50; L, 60–83
2000	Regional semifinals Regional Finals; Elite Eight; Final Four; National Championship	Minnesota–Duluth; North Dakota; Delta State; Columbus State; Northern Kentucky	W, 77–72; W, 92–72; W, 71–64; W, 72–56; L, 62–71 (OT)
2001	First round	Minnesota–Duluth	L, 73–81
2003	First round Second Round	Nebraska–Kearney; South Dakota	W, 76–69; L, 61–84
2004	First round Second Round	South Dakota; North Dakota	W, 70–63; L, 65–66

=== AIAW College Division/Division II ===
The Bison made two appearances in the AIAW National Division II basketball tournament, with a combined record of 2–2–1.

Year	Round	Opponent	Result
1979	First round	High Point	L, 40–93
1982	First round Second Round; Semifinals; Third-place game	Centenary; Biola; College of Charleston; William Penn	W, w/o W, 87–71; L, 73–88; T, 76–76

== Season–by–season results ==
Record table
Season	Coach	Overall	Conference	Standing	Postseason
Colette Folstad (No Conference) (1966–1970)
1966–67	Colette Folstad	3–3	—	—	
1967–68	Colette Folstad	8–2	—	—	
1968–69	Colette Folstad	5–4	—	—	
1969–70	Colette Folstad	9–1	—	—	
Colette Folstad:		25–10 (.714)	–		
Carol Mondor (No Conference) (1970–1971)
1970–71	Carol Mondor	3–8	—	—	
Carol Mondor:		3–8 (.273)	–		
Sue Feeney (No Conference) (1971–1972)
1971–72	Sue Feeney	7–4	—	—	
Sue Feeney:		7–4 (.636)	–		
Sharon Anderson (Minn–Kota Conference) (1972–1973)
1972–73	Sharon Anderson	6–10	1—2	—	
Sharon Anderson:		6–10 (.375)	1–2 (.333)		
Pat Halvorson (Minn–Kota Conference) (1973–1975)
1973–74	Pat Halvorson	10–4	5—2	—	
1974–75	Pat Halvorson	6–10	2—5	—	AIAW Playoffs
Pat Halvorson:		16–14 (.533)	7–7 (.500)		
Judy Strachen (Minn–Kota Conference) (1975–1977)
1975–76	Judy Strachen	4–14	2—5	—	
1976–77	Judy Strachen	3–22	—	—	AIAW Playoffs
Judy Strachen:		7–36 (.163)	2–5 (.286)		
Paul McKinnon (Minn–Kota Conference) (1977–1979)
1977–78	Paul McKinnon	12–21	—	—	AIAW Playoffs
1978–79	Paul McKinnon	13–19	—	—	AIAW Nationals
Paul McKinnon:		25–40 (.385)	–		
Amy Ruley (North Central Conference) (1979–2004)
1979–80	Amy Ruley	14–15	—	4th	
1980–81	Amy Ruley	19–12	—	5th	
1981–82	Amy Ruley	22–10	—	2nd	AIAW Fourth Place
1982–83	Amy Ruley	16–10	5—5	3rd	
1983–84	Amy Ruley	15–12	5—7	4th	
1984–85	Amy Ruley	19–8	8—6	4th	
1985–86	Amy Ruley	24–9	10—4	2nd	NCAA Division II Runner-up
1986–87	Amy Ruley	26–4	12—2	1st	NCAA Division II Quarterfinals
1987–88	Amy Ruley	28–3	13—1	1st	NCAA Division II Semifinals
1988–89	Amy Ruley	23–7	11—3	1st	NCAA Division II Regional Finals
1989–90	Amy Ruley	25–5	15—3	2nd	NCAA Division II Regional Finals
1990–91	Amy Ruley	31–2	16—2	2nd	NCAA Division II Champions
1991–92	Amy Ruley	29–4	16—2	1st	NCAA Division II Runner-up
1992–93	Amy Ruley	30–2	16—2	1st	NCAA Division II Champions
1993–94	Amy Ruley	27–5	15—3	1st	NCAA Division II Champions
1994–95	Amy Ruley	32–0	18—0	1st	NCAA Division II Champions
1995–96	Amy Ruley	30–2	17—1	1st	NCAA Division II Champions
1996–97	Amy Ruley	28–1	18—0	1st	NCAA Division II Sweet Sixteen
1997–98	Amy Ruley	22–6	14—4	2nd	NCAA Division II First Round
1998–99	Amy Ruley	24–5	14—4	2nd	NCAA Division II Sweet Sixteen
1999–00	Amy Ruley	28–4	14—4	1st	NCAA Division II Runner-up
2000–01	Amy Ruley	25–8	13—5	2nd	NCAA Division II First Round
2001–02	Amy Ruley	18–10	10—8	T—3rd	
2002–03	Amy Ruley	26–7	12—4	T—3rd	
2003–04	Amy Ruley	24–7	11—3	T—1st	
Amy Ruley (Independent) (2004–2007)
2004–05	Amy Ruley	26–1			
2005–06	Amy Ruley	9–17			
2006–07	Amy Ruley	14–11			
Amy Ruley (Summit League) (2007–2008)
2007–08	Amy Ruley	17–11	12—6	T—2nd	
Amy Ruley:		671–198 (.772)			
Carolyn DeHoff (Summit League) (2008–2014)
2008–09	Carolyn DeHoff	16–13	12—6	3rd	
2009–10	Carolyn DeHoff	16–13	11—7	5th	
2010–11	Carolyn DeHoff	13–16	9—9	T–6th	
2011–12	Carolyn DeHoff	11–20	8—10	5th	
2012–2013	Carolyn DeHoff	10–19	6—10	7th	
2013–14	Carolyn DeHoff	6–24	2—12	8th	
Carolyn DeHoff:		72–105 (.407)	48–54 (.471)		
Maren Walseth (Summit League) (2014–2019)
2014–15	Maren Walseth	11–18	7—9	6th	
2015–16	Maren Walseth	7–22	2—14	9th	
2016–17	Maren Walseth	6–24	4—12	7th	
2017–18	Maren Walseth	9–20	2—12	8th	
2018–19	Maren Walseth	7–22	4—12	7th	
Maren Walseth:		40–106 (.274)	19–59 (.244)		
Jory Collins (Summit League) (2019–present)
2019–20	Jory Collins	11–19	7—9	6th	
2020–21	Jory Collins	15–9	9—7	3rd	
2021–22	Jory Collins	11–18	7—11	6th	
2022–23	Jory Collins	18–12	12—6	2nd	WNIT First Round
2023–24	Jory Collins	22–12	13–3	2nd	WNIT Super 16
2024–25	Jory Collins	21–12	11–5	3rd	WNIT Great 8
2025–26	Jory Collins	29–5	15–1	1st	WBIT Second Round
Jory Collins:		127–87 (.593)	74–42 (.638)		
Total:		998–617 (.618)			
National champion Postseason invitational champion Conference regular season champion Conference regular season and conference tournament champion Division regular season champion Division regular season and conference tournament champion Conference tournament champion

== Arenas ==
- Bentson Bunker Fieldhouse 1966–1970
- Bison Sports Arena 1970–2016
- Scheels Center 2016–present
