= Sunshine State Conference women's basketball tournament =

Annual basketball tournament

- Conference basketball championship
- Sport: College basketball
- Conference: Sunshine State Conference
- Number of teams: 8
- Format: Single-elimination tournament
- Played: 1982–present
- Current champion: Nova Southeastern (4th)
- Most championships: Florida Southern (12)
- Official website: SSC women's basketball

The Sunshine State Conference women's basketball tournament is the annual conference women's basketball championship tournament for the NCAA Division II Sunshine State Conference. The tournament has been held annually since 1982. It is a single-elimination tournament and seeding is based on regular season records.

The tournament champion receives the SSC's automatic bid to the NCAA Women's Division II Basketball Championship.

Florida Southern have been the most successful program, with twelve titles.

== Results ==
Year	Champions	Score	Runner-up	Venue	MVP
1982	Central Florida	56–39	Florida Southern	Orlando, FL	Teresa Tinsley, Central Florida
1983	Central Florida (2)	61–56	Florida Southern	Lakeland, FL	Karen Harvey, Central Florida
1984	Central Florida (3)	61–56	Florida Southern	Lakeland, FL	Dorine VanTongeren, Central Florida
1985	Florida Southern	94–81	Tampa	Tampa, FL	Cathy Fox, Tampa
1986	Florida Southern (2)	86–60	Tampa	Tampa, FL	Kelly Carson, Florida Southern
1987	Florida Southern (3)	94–89	Rollins	Lakeland, FL	Kim Disbro, Florida Southern
1988	Rollins	77–73	Florida Southern	Lakeland, FL	Eileen Tobin, Rollins
1989	Florida Southern (4)	82–75	Rollins	Tampa, FL	Nanci Parks, Florida Southern
1990	Rollins (2)	72–63	Florida Tech	Winter Park, FL	Kendra Lasher, Rollins
1991	Barry	87–75	Rollins	Winter Park, FL	Maria Teal, Barry
1992	Florida Tech	71–66	Florida Southern	Winter Park, FL	Margaret Farley, Florida Tech
1993	Florida Tech (2)	87–75	Florida Southern	Tampa, FL	Paulette King, Florida Tech
1994	Florida Southern (5)	59–53	North Florida	Tampa, FL	Cindy Shannon, Florida Southern
1995	Florida Southern (6)	78–67	Tampa	Lakeland, FL	Crystal Ashley, Tampa; Kelly Charron, Florida Southern
1996	Florida Southern (7)	76–64	Florida Tech	Lakeland, FL	Tarra Blackwell, Florida Southern
1997	Florida Tech (3)	70–59	Barry	Lakeland, FL	Sanja Radenkovic, Florida Tech
1998	Florida Southern (8)	94–77	Rollins	Lakeland, FL	Tarra Blackwell, Florida Southern
1999	Rollins (3)	89–80	Florida Southern	Lakeland, FL	Nicole Sullivan, Rollins
2000	Tampa	79–76	Rollins	Lakeland, FL	Africa Gaston, Tampa
2001	Rollins (4)	93–76	Florida Tech	Lakeland, FL	Jill Razor, Rollins
2002	Florida Tech (4)	59–56	Rollins	Melbourne, FL	Kenya Storr, Rollins
2003	Florida Southern (9)	71–62 (OT)	Rollins	Lakeland, FL	Lucresia West, Florida Southern
2004	Rollins (5)	78–63	Florida Tech	Winter Park, FL	Mary Lou Johnston, Rollins
2005	Rollins (6)	65–56	Florida Tech	Miami Shores, FL	Joslyn Giles, Rollins
2006	Tampa (2)	56–47	Rollins	Saint Leo, FL	Tay Mathis, Tampa
2007	Tampa (3)	68–66 (OT)	Rollins	Boca Raton, FL	Alexa Kane, Tampa
2008	Nova Southeastern	53–47	Tampa	Tampa, FL	Stephanie Sarosi, Nova Southeastern
2009	Tampa (4)	55–29	Barry	Davie, FL	Gianna Messina, Tampa
2010	Lynn	54–52	Barry	Davie, FL	Chelsea Patterson, Lynn
2011	Florida Southern (10)	79–66	Florida Tech	Melbourne, FL	Emma Cannon, Florida Southern
2012	Rollins (7)	71–68	Florida Southern	Lakeland, FL	Ashley Jones, Rollins
2013	Rollins (8)	74–59	Saint Leo	Kissimmee, FL	Tera McDaniel, Rollins
2014	Nova Southeastern (2)	64–55	Tampa	Kissimmee, FL	Taylor Buie, Nova Southeastern
2015	Nova Southeastern (3)	61–51	Barry	Kissimmee, FL	Danielle Robinson, Nova Southeastern
2016	Tampa (5)	68–57	Florida Tech	Daytona Beach, FL	Juliana Cavallaro, Tampa
2017	Eckerd	77–56	Florida Tech	Daytona Beach, FL	Ada Yalcin, Eckerd
2018	Florida Southern (11)	87–68	Florida Tech	Lakeland, FL	Camille Giardina, Florida Southern
2019	Florida Southern (12)	61–60	Eckerd		Camille Giardina, Florida Southern
2020	Eckerd (2)	79–67	Tampa	Tampa, FL	Mikayla Kuehne, Eckerd
2021	Cancelled due to COVID-19 pandemic				
2022	Tampa (6)	74–67 (OT)	Florida Southern	Tampa, FL	LaShayla Wright-Ponder, Tampa
2023	Tampa (7)	63–43	Lynn	Tampa, FL	Sarah Jones, Tampa
2024	Eckerd (3)	65–57	Tampa	Tampa, FL	Lauryn Vieira, Eckerd
2025	Embry–Riddle	55–51	Nova Southeastern	Daytona Beach, FL	Madyson Jean-Louis, Embry–Riddle
2026	Nova Southeastern (4)	78–74	Florida Southern	Fort Lauderdale, FL	Bridie McCann, Nova Southeastern

== Championship records ==
School	Finals Record	Finals Appearances	Years
Florida Southern	12–10	22	1985, 1986, 1987, 1989, 1994, 1995, 1996, 1998, 2003, 2011, 2018, 2019
Rollins	8–9	17	1988, 1990, 1999, 2001, 2004, 2005, 2012, 2013
Tampa	7–7	14	2000, 2006, 2007, 2009, 2016, 2022, 2023
Florida Tech	4–9	13	1992, 1993, 1997, 2002
Nova Southeastern	4–1	5	2008, 2014, 2015, 2026
Eckerd	3–1	4	2017, 2020, 2024
UCF	3–0	3	1982, 1983, 1984
Barry	1–4	5	1991
Lynn	1–1	2	2010
Embry–Riddle	1–0	1	2025
North Florida	0–1	1	
Saint Leo	0–1	1	

- Palm Beach Atlantic have not yet reached the championship game of the Sunshine State Conference tournament.
- Schools highlighted in pink are former members of the Sunshine State Conference

== See also ==
- NCAA Division II women's basketball tournament
- Sunshine State Conference men's basketball tournament
