= 1988 NCAA Division II women's basketball tournament =

American collegiate basketball tournament

- Teams: 32
- Finals site: , Fargo, North Dakota
- Champions: Hampton Lady Pirates (1st title)
- Runner-up: West Texas State Buffaloes (1st title game)
- Semifinalists: Delta State Lady Statesmen (2nd Final Four); North Dakota State Bison (2nd Final Four)
- Winning coach: James Sweat (1st title)
- MOP: Jackie Dolberry (Hampton)

The 1988 NCAA Division II women's basketball tournament was the seventh annual tournament hosted by the NCAA to determine the national champion of Division II women's collegiate basketball in the United States.

Hampton defeated West Texas State in the championship game, 65–48, claiming the Lady Pirates' first NCAA Division II national title.

The championship rounds were contested in Fargo, North Dakota.

The championship field increased for the first time, from twenty-four to thirty-two teams, in 1988.

== Regionals ==
=== New England - Waltham, Massachusetts ===
Location: Dana Center Host: Bentley College

Regional semifinals Round of 32; March 11
New Haven	85
Stonehill	69
Bentley	69
New Hampshire College	52

Regional final Sweet 16; March 12
New Haven	50
Bentley	49

=== South - Cleveland, Mississippi ===
Location: Walter Sillers Coliseum Host: Delta State University

Regional semifinals Round of 32; March 11
Jacksonville State	79
Fort Valley State	70
Delta State	98
Bryant	65

Regional final Sweet 16; March 12
Jacksonville State	54
Delta State	64

=== West - Pomona, California ===
Location: Kellogg Gym Host: California State Polytechnic University, Pomona

Regional semifinals Round of 32; March 11
Cal Poly Pomona	88
UC Davis	52
Alaska Anchorage	87
Chico State	71

Regional final Sweet 16; March 12
Cal Poly Pomona	103
Alaska Anchorage	77

=== South Central - Warrensburg, Missouri ===
Location: CMSU Fieldhouse Host: Central Missouri State University

Regional semifinals Round of 32; March 11
Central Missouri State	70
Abilene Christian	58
West Texas State	64
Southeast Missouri State	61

Regional final Sweet 16; March 12
Central Missouri State	46
West Texas State	61

=== East - Johnstown, Pennsylvania ===
Location: Sports Center Host: University of Pittsburgh at Johnstown

Regional semifinals Round of 32; March 11
Pitt Johnstown	108
Indiana (PA)	55
Army	68
Gannon	53

Regional final Sweet 16; March 12
Pitt Johnstown	71
Army	66

=== South Atlantic - Emmitsburg, Maryland ===
Location: Knott Athletics and Recreation Center Host: Mount Saint Mary's College and Seminary

Regional semifinals Round of 32; March 11
Hampton	58
District of Columbia	50
Virginia State	87
Mount St. Mary's	72

Regional final Sweet 16; March 12
Hampton	73
Virginia State	58

=== North Central - Fargo, North Dakota ===
Location: Bison Sports Arena Host: North Dakota State University

Regional semifinals Round of 32; March 11
North Dakota State	77
St. Cloud State	57
South Dakota State	76
North Dakota	60

Regional final Sweet 16; March 12
North Dakota State	91
South Dakota State	77

=== Great Lakes - Highland Heights, Kentucky ===
Location: Regents Hall Host: Northern Kentucky University

Regional semifinals Round of 32; March 11
St. Joseph's (IN)	70
Grand Valley State	61
Lake Superior State	77**
Northern Kentucky	76

Regional final Sweet 16; March 12
St. Joseph's (IN)	70
Lake Superior State	61

== National Finals - Fargo, North Dakota ==
Final Four Location: Bison Sports Arena Host: North Dakota State University

National quarterfinals Elite Eight; See below
New Haven	70
Delta State	97
March 19 - Cleveland, Mississippi; March 18 - Pomona, California
Cal Poly Pomona	56
West Texas State	73
Pitt Johnstown	74
Hampton	80
March 19 - Hampton, Virginia; March 19 - Fargo, North Dakota
North Dakota State	87
St. Joseph's (IN)	74

National semifinals Final Four; March 25
Delta State	56
West Texas State	77
Hampton	72
North Dakota State	63

National championship March 26
West Texas State	48
Hampton	65

== All-tournament team ==
- Jackie Dolberry, Hampton
- Venice Frazer, Hampton
- Karen Drewry, Hampton
- Teresa Tinner, West Texas State
- Kristi Kremer, North Dakota State

== See also ==
- 1988 NCAA Division II men's basketball tournament
- 1988 NCAA Division I women's basketball tournament
- 1988 NCAA Division III women's basketball tournament
- 1988 NAIA women's basketball tournament
