= 2005 NCAA Division II women's basketball tournament =

- Teams: 64
- Finals site: Summit Arena, Hot Springs, Arkansas
- Champions: Washburn Ichabods (1st title)
- Runner-up: Seattle Pacific Falcons (1st title game)
- Semifinalists: Central Arkansas Sugar Bears (1st Final Four); Merrimack Warriors (2nd Final Four)
- Winning coach: Ron McHenry (1st title)
- MOP: Carla Sintra (Washburn)

The 2005 NCAA Division II women's basketball tournament was the 24th annual tournament hosted by the NCAA to determine the national champion of Division II women's collegiate basketball in the United States.

Washburn defeated Seattle Pacific in the championship game, 70–53, to claim the Ichabods' first NCAA Division II national title.

The championship rounds were contested at the Summit Arena in Hot Springs, Arkansas.

== Regionals ==
=== East - Anderson, South Carolina ===
Location: Abney Athletic Center Host: Anderson University

First round Round of 64; March 12
1	Anderson (SC)	90
8	Millersville	79
4	Fairmont State	60
5	Glenville State	57
3	Charleston (WV)	79
6	Clarion	57
2	California (PA)	78
7	Wheeling Jesuit	68

Regional semifinals Round of 32; March 13
1	Anderson (SC)	90
4	Fairmont State	77
3	Charleston (WV)	96
2	California (PA)	81

Regional finals Sweet Sixteen; March 15
1	Anderson (SC)	71
3	Charleston (WV)	88

=== Great Lakes - Allendale, Michigan ===
Location: Grand Valley Field House Host: Grand Valley State University

First round Round of 64; March 12
1	Grand Valley State	73
8	Wisconsin–Parkside	69
5	Indianapolis	60
4	Michigan Tech	54
6	Lewis (IL)	56
3	Quincy (IL)	63
7	Bellarmine	75
2	Lake Superior State	87

Regional semifinals Round of 32; March 13
1	Grand Valley State	95
5	Indianapolis	69
3	Quincy (IL)	66
2	Lake Superior State	55

Regional finals Sweet Sixteen; March 15
1	Grand Valley State	62
3	Quincy (IL)	46

=== North Central - Grand Forks, North Dakota ===
Location: Betty Engelstad Sioux Center Host: University of North Dakota

First round Round of 64; March 12
8	Fort Hays State	56
1	North Dakota	87
4	Concordia–St. Paul	83
5	Metro State	70
6	Minnesota Duluth	73
3	Regis	60
2	MSU Moorhead	57
7	St. Cloud State	79

Regional semifinals Round of 32; March 13
1	North Dakota	76
4	Concordia–St. Paul	78
6	Minnesota–Duluth	59
7	St. Cloud State	67

Regional finals Sweet Sixteen; March 15
4	Concordia–St. Paul	70
7	St. Cloud State	81

=== Northeast - North Andover, Massachusetts ===
Location: Volpe Complex Host: Merrimack College

First round Round of 64; March 12
1	Merrimack	72
8	Bridgeport	46
5	American International	76
4	Holy Family	55
6	Pace	53
3	Southern Connecticut	55
2	Bentley	67
7	Bryant	56

Regional semifinals Round of 32; March 14
1	Merrimack	76
5	American International	67
3	Southern Connecticut	49
2	Bentley	63

Regional finals Sweet Sixteen; March 15
1	Merrimack	52
2	Bentley	44

=== South - Conway, Arkansas ===
Location: Jeff Farris Center Host: University of Central Arkansas

First round Round of 64; March 12
1	Central Arkansas	88
8	Rollins	58
5	Fort Valley State	75
4	Tuskegee	53
3	Henderson State	80
6	Paine	72
7	Florida Tech	47
2	Valdosta State	67

Regional semifinals Round of 32; March 13
1	Central Arkansas	103
5	Fort Valley State	88
3	Henderson State	69
2	Valdosta State	56

Regional finals Sweet Sixteen; March 15
1	Central Arkansas	76
3	Henderson State	61

=== South Atlantic - Raleigh, North Carolina ===
Location: Spaulding Gym Host: Shaw University

First round Round of 64; March 12
1	Shaw	78
8	USC Aiken	48
4	Columbus State	71
5	Wingate	82
3	Carson-Newman	79
6	Fayetteville State	67
2	Clayton State	79
7	Newberry	45

Regional semifinals Round of 32; March 13
1	Shaw	105
5	Wingate	74
3	Carson-Newman	75
2	Clayton State	61

Regional finals Sweet Sixteen; March 15
1	Shaw	67
3	Carson-Newman	53

=== South Central - Springfield, Missouri ===
Location: Weiser Gymnasium Host: Drury University

First round Round of 64; March 12
8	Abilene Christian	75
1	Drury	112
5	Central Missouri State	69
4	Emporia State	82
3	Angelo State	63
6	Northeastern State	53
2	Washburn	75
7	West Texas A&M	62

Regional semifinals Round of 32; March 13
1	Drury	71
4	Emporia State	78
3	Angelo State	67
2	Washburn	76

Regional finals Sweet Sixteen; March 15
4	Emporia State	51
2	Washburn	63

=== West - Seattle, Washington ===
Location: Royal Brougham Pavilion Host: Seattle Pacific University

First round Round of 64; March 12
1	Seattle Pacific	71
8	Montana State Billings	47
5	Cal State Bakersfield	65
4	Saint Martin's	73
6	Cal Poly Pomona	59
3	Chico State	77
7	Cal State Dominguez Hills	74
2	Western Washington	82

Regional semifinals Round of 32; March 13
1	Seattle Pacific	86
4	Saint Martin's	63
3	Chico State	85
2	Western Washington	75

Regional finals Sweet Sixteen; March 15
1	Seattle Pacific	85
3	Chico State	70

== Elite Eight - Hot Springs, Arkansas ==
Location: Summit Arena Hosts: Henderson State University and Hot Springs Convention Center

National quarterfinals Elite Eight; March 23
W	Seattle Pacific	67
GL	Grand Valley State	55
NE	Merrimack	79
NC	St. Cloud State	78
S	Central Arkansas	87
SA	Shaw	73
SC	Washburn	73
E	Charleston (WV)	60

National semifinals Final Four; March 24
W	Seattle Pacific	73
NE	Merrimack	64
S	Central Arkansas	67
Sc	Washburn	69

National championship March 26
W	Seattle Pacific	53
SC	Washburn	70

== All-tournament team ==
- Carla Sintra, Washburn
- Lora Westling, Washburn
- Juwanna Rivers, Washburn
- Amy Taylor, Seattle Pacific
- Carone Harris, Central Arkansas

== See also ==
- 2005 NCAA Division I women's basketball tournament
- 2005 NCAA Division III women's basketball tournament
- 2005 NAIA Division I women's basketball tournament
- 2005 NAIA Division II women's basketball tournament
- 2005 NCAA Division II men's basketball tournament
