= Carolyn DeHoff =

American basketball coach

Biographical details
- Born: November 7, 1967 (age 58)

Playing career
- 1987–1990: Arizona State

Coaching career (HC unless noted)
- 1990–1991: Coronado HS (AZ) (asst.)
- 1991–1998: Wyoming (asst.)
- 1998–2003: Weber State (asst.)
- 2003–2008: Utah (asst.)
- 2008–2014: North Dakota State
- 2014–2023: Roy HS (UT)

Head coaching record
- Overall: 72–105

Carolyn DeHoff (born November 7, 1967) is an American former college basketball coach who was the head coach of the North Dakota State Bison women's basketball team from 2008 to 2014.

== Playing ==
DeHoff was a Street & Smith All-American her senior year at Cheyenne East High School. From 1987 to 1990, she played for the Arizona State Sun Devils. She graduated from ASU in 1991 with a bachelor's degree in exercise science and physical education.

== Coaching ==
DeHoff started her coaching career at Coronado High School in Scottsdale, Arizona, then worked as assistant role at the University of Wyoming, Weber State University and the University of Utah. From 2008 to 2014, she was the head coach at North Dakota State Bison women's basketball, where she compiled a 72–105 record. She finished her career in 2023 after a nine-year stint at Roy High School in Roy, Utah.

== Career statistics ==
Legend
GP	Games played	GS	Games started	MPG	Minutes per game	RPG	Rebounds per game
APG	Assists per game	SPG	Steals per game	BPG	Blocks per game	PPG	Points per game
TO	Turnovers per game	FG%	Field-goal percentage	3P%	3-point field-goal percentage	FT%	Free-throw percentage
**Bold**	Career best	°	League leader

=== College ===
Year	Team	GP	GS	MPG	FG%	3P%	FT%	RPG	APG	SPG	BPG	TO	PPG
1987–88	Arizona State	28	-	-	38.0	20.0	65.6	5.1	4.1	1.3	0.0	-	10.2
1988–89	Arizona State	28	-	-	37.1	22.2	63.4	6.7	3.9	1.3	-	-	10.2
1988–90	Arizona State	28	-	-	36.2	11.1	64.4	5.0	3.6	1.6	0.0	-	7.1
**Career**		84	-	-	37.2	18.9	64.6	5.6	3.9	1.4	0.0	-	9.2
Statistics retrieved from Sports-Reference.
