= 1986 NCAA Division II women's basketball tournament =

American collegiate basketball tournament

- Teams: 24
- Finals site: , Springfield, Massachusetts
- Champions: Cal Poly Pomona Broncos (3rd title)
- Runner-up: North Dakota State Bison (1st title game)
- Semifinalists: Delta State Lady Statesmen (1st Final Four); Philadelphia Textile Rams (1st Final Four)
- Winning coach: Darlene May (3rd title)
- MOP: Debra Larsen (Cal Poly Pomona)

The 1986 NCAA Division II women's basketball tournament was the fifth annual tournament hosted by the NCAA to determine the national champion of Division II women's collegiate basketball in the United States.

Defending champions Cal Poly Pomona defeated North Dakota State in the championship game, 70–63, the Broncos' third NCAA Division II national title.

The championship rounds were contested at the Springfield Civic Center in Springfield, Massachusetts, hosted by Springfield College.

== Regionals ==
=== East ===
First round - at Pace; Round of 24; March 8		Regional finals - at Philadelphia Textile; Sweet 16; March 11
		Philadelphia Textile	73
Pace	72	Slippery Rock	60
Slippery Rock	74

=== Great Lakes ===
First round - at Bellarmine; Round of 24; March 8		Regional finals - at Bellarmine; Sweet 16; March 11
		Lake Superior State	54
Bellarmine	69	Bellarmine	67
Northern Kentucky	52

=== New England ===
First round - at New Haven; Round of 24; March 8		Regional finals - at Central Connecticut State; Sweet 16; March 11
		Central Connecticut State	87
New Haven	60	Quinnipiac	63
Quinnipiac	62

=== North Central ===
First round - at North Dakota State; Round of 24; March 8		Regional finals - at Mankato State; Sweet 16; March 11
		Mankato State	62
Bryant	63	North Dakota State	67
North Dakota State	81

=== South ===
First round - at Delta State; Round of 24; March 8		Regional finals - at Delta State; Sweet 16; March 11
		Florida International	64
Clark Atlanta	54	Delta State	93
Delta State	100

=== South Atlantic ===
First round - at Hampton; Round of 24; March 8		Regional finals - at Mount St. Mary's; Sweet 16; March 11
		Mount St. Mary's	83
Hampton	73	Hampton	86
Norfolk State	60

=== South Central ===
First round - at Alaska Anchorage; Round of 24; March 8		Regional finals - at Central Missouri State; Sweet 16; March 11
		Central Missouri State	65
Alaska Anchorage	65	Southeast Missouri State	64
Southeast Missouri State	80

=== West ===
First round - at Cal State Northridge; Round of 24; March 8		Regional finals at Cal Poly Pomona; Sweet 16; March 11
		Cal Poly Pomona	66
UC Davis	57	Cal State Northridge	46
Cal State Northridge	68

== National Finals - Springfield, Massachusetts ==
Visiting team listed first and date March 15 in Elite Eight unless indicated

Final Four Location: Springfield Civic Center Host: Springfield College

National quarterfinals Elite Eight
SC	Central Missouri State	60
NC	North Dakota State	77
site unknown
E	Philadelphia Textile	84
NE	Central Connecticut State	66
SA	Hampton	61
S	Delta State	82
March 14
GL	Bellarmine	49
W	Cal Poly Pomona	83

National semifinals Final Four; March 21
NC	North Dakota State	77
E	Philadelphia Textile	61
S	Delta State	68
W	Cal Poly Pomona	71

National championship March 22
NC	North Dakota State	63
W	Cal Poly Pomona	70

== All-tournament team ==
- Debra Larsen, Cal Poly Pomona
- Michelle McCoy, Cal Poly Pomona
- Vickie Mitchell, Cal Poly Pomona
- Janice Woods, North Dakota State
- Pat Smykowski, North Dakota State
- Vincene Morris, Philadelphia Textile

== See also ==
- 1986 NCAA Division II men's basketball tournament
- 1986 NCAA Division I women's basketball tournament
- 1986 NCAA Division III women's basketball tournament
- 1986 NAIA women's basketball tournament
