= 2006 NCAA Division II women's basketball tournament =

- Teams: 64
- Finals site: Summit Arena, Hot Springs, Arkansas
- Champions: Grand Valley State Lakers (1st title)
- Runner-up: American International Yellow Jackets (1st title game)
- Semifinalists: Chico State Wildcats (1st Final Four); St. Cloud State Huskies (1st Final Four)
- Winning coach: Dawn Plitzuweit (1st title)
- MOP: Julia Braseth (Grand Valley State)

The 2006 NCAA Division II women's basketball tournament was the 25th annual tournament hosted by the NCAA to determine the national champion of Division II women's collegiate basketball in the United States.

Grand Valley State defeated American International in the championship game, 58–52, to claim the Lakers' first NCAA Division II national title.

For the second consecutive year, the championship rounds were contested at the Summit Arena in Hot Springs, Arkansas.

== Regionals ==
=== East - Charleston, West Virginia ===
Location: Eddie King Gym Host: University of Charleston

First round Round of 64; March 10
1	Charleston (WV)	71
8	Edinboro	62
4	California (PA)	62
5	Wheeling Jesuit	79
3	Anderson (SC)	84
6	West Liberty State	72
7	Barton	52
2	Glenville State	79

Regional semifinals Round of 32; March 11
1	Charleston (WV)	90*
5	Wheeling Jesuit	88
3	Anderson (SC)	72
2	Glenville State	94

Regional finals Sweet Sixteen; March 13
1	Charleston (WV)	68
2	Glenville State	58

=== Great Lakes - Springfield, Missouri ===
Location: Weiser Gymnasium Host: Drury University

First round Round of 64; March 10
1	Drury	75
8	Quincy (IL)	52
4	Lake Superior State	66
5	Lewis (IL)	89
6	Michigan Tech	66
3	Northern Kentucky	67
7	Ashland	59
2	Grand Valley State	87

Regional semifinals Round of 32; March 11
1	Drury	85
5	Lewis (IL)	68
3	Northern Kentucky	70
2	Grand Valley State	91

Regional finals Sweet Sixteen; March 13
1	Drury	76
2	Grand Valley State	91

=== North Central - Grand Forks, North Dakota ===
Location: Betty Engelstad Sioux Center Host: University of North Dakota

First round Round of 64; March 10
8	CSU Pueblo	69
1	North Dakota	92
4	Northern State	89
5	Regis	79
6	Augustana (SD)	69
3	St. Cloud State	82
7	Concordia–St. Paul	74
2	Wayne State (NE)	59

Regional semifinals Round of 32; March 11
1	North Dakota	90
4	Northern State	58
3	St. Cloud State	96
7	Concordia–St. Paul	89

Regional finals Sweet Sixteen; March 13
1	North Dakota	69
3	St. Cloud State	75

=== Northeast - New Haven, Connecticut ===
Location: James W. Moore Fieldhouse Host: Southern Connecticut State University

First round Round of 64; March 10
1	Southern Connecticut	76
8	USciences	43
5	Holy Family	70
4	Pace	62
3	American International	71
6	Saint Rose	59
7	New Haven	70
2	Stonehill	77

Regional semifinals Round of 32; March 11
1	Southern Connecticut	58
5	Holy Family	41
3	American International	71
2	Stonehill	59

Regional finals Sweet Sixteen; March 13
1	Southern Connecticut	40
3	American International	48

=== South - Arkadelphia, Arkansas ===
Location: Wells Center Host: Henderson State University

First round Round of 64; March 10
1	Delta State	66
8	Tampa	50
5	Florida Gulf Coast	48*
4	Rollins	46
3	Fort Valley State	64
6	West Florida	65
2	Henderson State	77
7	Paine	65

Regional semifinals Round of 32; March 11
1	Delta State	57
5	Florida Gulf Coast	48
6	West Florida	62
2	Henderson State	68

Regional finals Sweet Sixteen; March 13
1	Delta State	40
2	Henderson State	44

=== South Atlantic - Raleigh, North Carolina ===
Location: Spaulding Gym Host: Shaw University

First round Round of 64; March 10
8	Newberry	50
1	Shaw	53
5	Georgia College	48
4	North Carolina Central	51
3	Clayton State	76
6	Johnson C. Smith	52
7	USC Upstate	59
2	Wingate	67

Regional semifinals Round of 32; March 11
1	Shaw	80
4	North Carolina Central	65
3	Clayton State	64
2	Wingate	67

Regional finals Sweet Sixteen; March 13
1	Shaw	68
2	Wingate	57

=== South Central - Topeka, Kansas ===
Location: Lee Arena Host: Washburn University

First round Round of 64; March 10
8	St. Mary's (TX)	58
1	Washburn	92
4	Angelo State	68
5	Central Missouri State	79
3	Emporia State	85
6	Tarleton State	67
7	Northeastern State	64
2	West Texas A&M	78

Regional semifinals Round of 32; March 11
1	Washburn	65
5	Central Missouri State	51
3	Emporia State	88
2	West Texas A&M	82

Regional finals Sweet Sixteen; March 13
1	Washburn	59
3	Emporia State	61*

=== West - Bellingham, Washington ===
Location: Sam Carver Gymnasium Host: Western Washington University

First round Round of 64; March 10
8	Northwest Nazarene	54
1	Western Washington	66
4	UC San Diego	57
5	Seattle Pacific	62
3	Cal State Bakersfield	82
6	Cal State Los Angeles	77
2	Chico State	83
7	Humboldt State	69

Regional semifinals Round of 32; March 11
1	Western Washington	50
5	Seattle Pacific	70
3	Cal State Bakersfield	80
2	Chico State	83

Regional finals Sweet Sixteen; March 13
5	Seattle Pacific	63
2	Chico State	72

== Elite Eight - Hot Springs, Arkansas ==
Location: Summit Arena Hosts: Henderson State University and Hot Springs Convention Center

National quarterfinals Elite Eight; March 22
NC	St. Cloud State	78
SA	Shaw	71
NE	American International	86
SC	Emporia State	79
W	Chico State	67
S	Henderson State	66
GL	Grand Valley State	74
E	Charleston (WV)	59

National semifinals Final Four; March 23
NC	St. Cloud State	58
NE	American International	70
W	Chico State	63
GL	Grand Valley State	76

National championship March 25
NE	American International	52
GL	Grand Valley State	58

== All-tournament team ==
- Julia Braseth, Grand Valley State
- Niki Reams, Grand Valley State
- Krystal Pressley, American International
- Sharmion Selman, American International
- Michelle Stueve, Emporia State

== See also ==
- 2006 NCAA Division I women's basketball tournament
- 2006 NCAA Division III women's basketball tournament
- 2006 NAIA Division I women's basketball tournament
- 2006 NAIA Division II women's basketball tournament
- 2006 NCAA Division II men's basketball tournament
