= Pine Bluff Convention Center =

Convention center in Pine Bluff, Arkansas

- Interactive map of the Pine Bluff Convention Center area

General information
- Location: 1 Convention Center Drive, Pine Bluff, Arkansas, U.S.
- Coordinates: 34.22072°N 91.99793°W
- Opened: June 27, 1976

Technical details
- Size: Arena: 22,984 sq ft (2,135.3 m^{2}); Banquet Hall: 14,400 sq ft (1,340 m^{2})

Other information
- Seating capacity: 8,500 (arena); 1,899 (theater)

The Pine Bluff Convention Center is a convention center located in Pine Bluff, Arkansas at One Convention Center Plaza. It was built in 1976, opening on June 27th of that year.

== Available Facilities ==
=== Arena ===
- An 8,500-seat multi-purpose arena featuring 22,984 square feet (2,135.3 m^{2}) of space and a 40-foot (12 m) ceiling height. The arena hosts local concerts and sporting events, including boxing, basketball, auto racing, wrestling, and rodeos, as well as conventions, trade shows, circuses, dances and banquets for the area. There are 5,000 permanent seats, and the arena can hold up to 2,500 for banquets and 1,296 classroom-style. The arena has four concession stands and four restrooms along its concourse, and 5 dressing rooms. The arena's loading dock can accommodate four trucks.

=== Banquet Hall ===
- A 14,400-square-foot (1,340 m^{2}) banquet hall, seating up to 2,000 theater-style, 1,400 for banquets and 1,000 classroom-style. It is used for trade shows, conventions, banquets, luncheons and other special events. It is divisible into four smaller rooms and is served by a modern full-line kitchen. The banquet hall is unique in that it is lit by tracks of colored lights. Adjacent is a 310-square-foot (29 m^{2}) meeting room.

=== Theater ===
- A 1,899-seat theater used for concerts, opera, Broadway shows, recitals, ceremonies and other special events. The theater's 93'3"-by 47' stage can accommodate 600 theater-style, 450 banquet-style and 300 classroom-style. The theater also contains 5 dressing rooms at stage level.

In addition, the Convention Center also contains three VIP suites, and a 2,048-square-foot (190.3 m^{2}) storage area.

=== Sports ===
- The Convention Center is also home to the Arkansas Rivercatz of the American Basketball Association..

=== Notable events ===
- On January 13, 2001 Extreme Championship Wrestling's last ever event before the promotion shut down was held at the convention center.

== Arkansas Entertainers Hall of Fame ==
The Pine Bluff Convention Center features the Arkansas Entertainers Hall of Fame, with artifacts and memorabilia of entertainers from Arkansas. Celebrities highlighted include singer Johnny Cash, author John Grisham, musicians Levon Helm, Jimmy Driftwood, Art Porter Jr., Jim Ed Brown, Charlie Rich, Collin Raye and Tracy Lawrence, actors Jerry Van Dyke and Billy Bob Thornton, and producer Harry Thomason. Elvis Presley September 7 and 8th 1976. Admission is free.

== See also ==
- List of convention centers in the United States
