= NCAA Division II women's basketball tournament =

Annual tournament

- Current season, competition or edition: 2026 NCAA Division II women's basketball tournament
- Association: NCAA
- Sport: College basketball
- Founded: 1982; 44 years ago
- Division: Division II
- No. of teams: 64
- Country: United States; Canada
- Most recent champion: Grand Valley State (3rd)
- Most titles: Cal Poly Pomona (5); North Dakota State (5)
- Broadcasters: ESPN+ and CBS national championship game
- Website: NCAA.com

The NCAA Division II women's basketball tournament (officially called as "Championship" instead of "Tournament") is an annual tournament to help determine the National Collegiate Athletic Association (NCAA) Division II women's college basketball national champion.

Basketball was originally one of the 12 women's sports added to the NCAA championship program for the 1981–82 school year, as the NCAA and Association for Intercollegiate Athletics for Women (AIAW) sought for sole governance of women's collegiate athletics. The AIAW continued to conduct its established championships; however, after a year of dual women's championships at the national level, the AIAW disbanded.

The 2020 Elite Eight was scheduled to be played at the Birmingham CrossPlex in Birmingham, AL before the NCAA called off the tournament because of the COVID-19 outbreak during that tim.

The field was reduced to 48 schools in 2021 due COVID but it returned to the full normal 64 teams the following year in 2022.

Grand Valley State is now the defending national champions, winning their third national title in 2026.

== Qualification ==
A total of 64 bids are normally available for each tournament: 23 automatic bids (awarded to the champion of each Division II all-sports conference) and 41 at-large bids. Due to COVID-19 issues, the 2020 tournament was canceled, and the 2021 tournament was reduced to 48 teams when nine all-sports conferences chose not to compete in women's basketball in 2020–21.

The bids are allocated evenly among the eight NCAA-designated regions (Atlantic, Central, East, Midwest, South, South Central, Southeast, and West), each of which contains either two or three of the 23 Division II conferences that sponsor women's basketball. Each region normally consists of two or three automatic qualifiers (the teams who won their respective conference tournaments) and five or six at-large bids (awarded regardless of conference affiliation).

=== Conference tournaments ===
Region	Conference	Tournament	Debut	Most titles	Current champion (2026)
Atlantic (Note: Also includes D-II independent Salem)	CIAA	Tournament	1975	Shaw (11)	Winston-Salem State (1st)
Atlantic	Mountain East	Tournament	2014	Glenville State (5)	Charleston (WV) (3rd)
Atlantic	PSAC	Tournament	1980	California (PA) (7); Indiana (PA) (7)	Indiana (PA) (7th)
Central	Great American	Tournament	2012	Southwestern Oklahoma State (4)	Northwestern Oklahoma State (1st)
Central	MIAA	Tournament	1983	Washburn (10)	Washburn (10th)
Central	NSIC	Tournament	2000	Minnesota–Duluth (8)	Concordia St. Paul (6th)
East	CACC	Tournament	2002	Holy Family (8)	Felician (1st)
East	East Coast	Tournament	1991	Saint Rose (6); Daemen (6)	Daemen (6th)
East	Northeast-10	Tournament	1982	Bentley (24)	Southern Connecticut (3rd)
Midwest	GLIAC	Tournament	1991	Northern Michigan (8); Michigan Tech (8)	Grand Valley State (6th)
Midwest	GLVC	Tournament	1998	Drury (10)	Maryville (2nd)
Midwest	G-MAC	Tournament	2013	Ashland (4)	Northwood (1st)
South (Note: Also includes D-II independents UPR Bayamón, UPR Mayagüez, and UPR Río Piedras)	Gulf South	Tournament	1983	Delta State (16)	Union (TN) (8th)
South	SIAC	Tournament	1979	Fort Valley State (11)	Miles (3rd)
South	Sunshine State	Tournament	1982	Florida Southern (12)	Nova Southeastern (4th)
South Central	Lone Star	Tournament	1983	West Texas A&M (16)	Texas Woman's (4th)
South Central	RMAC	Tournament	1985	Colorado Mesa (6); CSU Pueblo (6); Nebraska–Kearney (6)	Colorado Mesa (6th)
Southeast	Carolinas	Tournament	1996	Belmont Abbey (7)	Lees–McRae (1st)
Southeast	Peach Belt	Tournament	1992	Columbus State (5); Lander (5); Georgia College (5); North Georgia (5)	Augusta (3rd)
Southeast	SAC	Tournament	1991	Wingate Bulldogs (10)	Coker (1st)
West	CCAA	Tournament	1986	Cal Poly Pomona (11)	Cal State Los Angeles (1st)
West	GNAC	Tournament	2011	Alaska Anchorage (7)	Montana State Billings (2nd)
West	Pacific West	Tournament	2013	Azusa Pacific and Hawaii Pacific (4)	Vanguard (1st)

== Results ==
NCAA Division II Women's Basketball Championship
Year	Site (Host Team)	Championship			Third Place Match / Semifinalists		
Year	Site (Host Team)	Champion	Score	Runner-up	Third place	Score	Fourth place
1982; Details	Springfield, MA (Springfield Civic Center)	Cal Poly Pomona	93–74	Tuskegee	Mount St. Mary's	73–62	Oakland
1983; Details	Springfield, MA (Springfield Civic Center)	Virginia Union	73–60	Cal Poly Pomona	Southern Connecticut State; Central Missouri State		
1984; Details	Springfield, MA (Springfield Civic Center)	Central Missouri State	80–73	Virginia Union	Dayton; Valdosta State		
1985; Details	Springfield, MA (Springfield Civic Center)	Cal Poly Pomona (2)	80–69	Central Missouri State	Hampton; Mercer		
1986; Details	Springfield, MA (Springfield Civic Center)	Cal Poly Pomona (3)	70–63	North Dakota State	Delta State; Philadelphia Textile		
1987; Details	Springfield, MA (Springfield Civic Center)	New Haven	77–75	Cal Poly Pomona	Northern Kentucky; Pitt Johnstown		
1988; Details	Fargo, ND (Bison Sports Arena)	Hampton	65–48	West Texas State	Delta State; North Dakota State		
1989; Details	Cleveland, MS (Walter Sillers Coliseum)	Delta State	88–58	Cal Poly Pomona	Bentley	83–81	Central Missouri State
1990; Details	Pomona, CA (Kellogg Gymnasium)	Delta State (2)	77–43	Bentley	Cal Poly Pomona	87–68	Oakland
1991; Details	Cape Girardeau, MO (Show Me Center)	North Dakota State	81–74	Southeast Missouri State	Bentley	60–58	Norfolk State
1992; Details	Fargo, ND (Bison Sports Arena)	Delta State (3)	65–63	North Dakota State	Portland State	72–69	Bentley
1993; Details	Waltham, MA (Dana Athletic Center)	North Dakota State (2)	95–63	Delta State	Michigan Tech	74–60	Bentley
1994; Details	Fargo, ND (Bison Sports Arena)	North Dakota State (3)	89–56	Cal State San Bernardino	North Alabama	79–75	Bellarmine
1995; Details	Fargo, ND (Bison Sports Arena)	North Dakota State (4)	98–85	Portland State	Missouri Western State	76–66	Stonehill
1996; Details	Fargo, ND (Bison Sports Arena)	North Dakota State (5)	104–78	Shippensburg	Abilene Christian	83–65	Delta State
1997; Details	Grand Forks, ND (Hyslop Sports Center)	North Dakota	94–78	Southern Indiana	UC Davis	76–61	Bentley
1998; Details	Pine Bluff, AR (H.O. Clemmons Arena)	North Dakota (2)	92–76	Emporia State	Francis Marion; Northern Michigan		
1999; Details	Pine Bluff, AR (H.O. Clemmons Arena)	North Dakota (3)	80–63	Arkansas Tech	Emporia State; Northern Kentucky		
2000; Details	Pine Bluff, AR (H.O. Clemmons Arena)	Northern Kentucky	71–62 (OT)	North Dakota State	Columbus State; Western Washington		
2001; Details	Rochester, MN (Mayo Civic Center)	Cal Poly Pomona (4)	87–80 (OT)	North Dakota	Shippensburg; Columbus State		
2002; Details	Rochester, MN (Mayo Civic Center)	Cal Poly Pomona (5)	74–62	Southeastern Oklahoma	Glenville State; South Dakota State		
2003; Details	St. Joseph, MO (St. Joseph Civic Arena)	South Dakota State	65–50	Northern Kentucky	Bentley; California (PA)		
2004; Details	St. Joseph, MO (St. Joseph Civic Arena)	California (PA)	75–72	Drury	Henderson State; Merrimack		
2005; Details	Hot Springs, AR (Summit Arena)	Washburn	70–53	Seattle Pacific	Central Arkansas; Merrimack		
2006; Details	Hot Springs, AR (Summit Arena)	Grand Valley State	58–52	American International	Chico State; St. Cloud State		
2007; Details	Kearney, NE (Health and Sports Center)	Southern Connecticut State	61–45	Florida Gulf Coast	Clayton State; UC San Diego		
2008; Details	Kearney, NE (Health and Sports Center)	Northern Kentucky (2)	63–58	South Dakota	Alaska Anchorage; Delta State		
2009; Details	San Antonio, TX (Bill Greehey Arena)	Minnesota State	103–94	Franklin Pierce	Alaska Anchorage; Delta State		
2010; Details	St. Joseph, MO (St. Joseph Civic Arena)	Emporia State	65–53	Fort Lewis	Franklin Pierce; Gannon		
2011; Details	St. Joseph, MO (St. Joseph Civic Arena)	Clayton State	69–50	Michigan Tech	Shaw; Northwest Missouri State		
2012; Details	San Antonio, TX (Bill Greehey Arena)	Shaw	88–82 (OT)	Ashland	Bentley; Rollins		
2013; Details	San Antonio, TX (Bill Greehey Arena)	Ashland	71–56	Dowling	Augustana (SD); Western Washington		
2014; Details	Erie, PA (Erie Insurance Arena)	Bentley	73–65	West Texas A&M	Cal Poly Pomona; Nova Southeastern		
2015; Details	Sioux Falls, SD (Sanford Pentagon)	California (PA) (2)	86–69	California Baptist	Emporia State; Limestone		
2016; Details	Indianapolis, IN (Bankers Life Fieldhouse)	Lubbock Christian	78–73	Alaska Anchorage	Bentley; Grand Valley State		
2017; Details	Columbus, OH (Alumni Hall)	Ashland (2)	93–77	Virginia Union	California Baptist; Harding		
2018; Details	Sioux Falls, SD (Sanford Pentagon)	Central Missouri (2)	66–52	Ashland	Indiana (PA); Union (TN)		
2019; Details	Columbus, OH (Alumni Hall)	Lubbock Christian (2)	95–85 (2OT)	Southwestern Oklahoma	Drury; Indiana (PA)		
2020; Details	Birmingham, AL (Birmingham CrossPlex)	Canceled due to the coronavirus pandemic					
2021; Details	Columbus, OH (Alumni Hall)	Lubbock Christian (3)	69–59	Drury	Central Missouri; Lander		
2022; Details	Birmingham, AL (Birmingham CrossPlex)	Glenville State	85–72	Western Washington	Grand Valley State; North Georgia		
2023; Details	Dallas, TX (American Airlines Center) (Note: Only the final game was held in Dallas. The remainder of the Elite Eight was held at St. Joseph Civic Arena in St. Joseph, Missouri.)	Ashland (3)	78–67	Minnesota–Duluth	Catawba; Glenville State		
2024; Details	St. Joseph, MO (St. Joseph Civic Arena)	Minnesota State (2)	89–73	Texas Woman's	Cal State San Marcos; Ferris State		
2025; Details	Pittsburgh, PA (UPMC Cooper Fieldhouse)	Grand Valley State (2)	70–58	Cal State Dominguez Hills	Pittsburg State; Union (TN)		
2026; Details	Pittsburgh, PA (UPMC Cooper Fieldhouse)	Grand Valley State (3)	72–49	Indiana (PA)	Alabama-Huntsville; Colorado Mesa		
2027	Pittsburgh, PA (UPMC Cooper Fieldhouse)						
2028	Pittsburgh, PA (UPMC Cooper Fieldhouse)						

== Champions ==
Schools with national championships
– 5 championships, – 3 championships
– 2 championships, – 1 championship

=== Active programs ===
Team	Titles	Years
Cal Poly Pomona	5	1982, 1985, 1986, 2001, 2002
Grand Valley State	3	2006, 2025, 2026
Ashland	3	2013, 2017, 2023
Lubbock Christian	3	2016, 2019, 2021
Delta State	3	1989, 1990, 1992
Minnesota State	2	2009, 2024
Central Missouri	2	1984, 2018
California (PA)	2	2004, 2015
Glenville State	1	2022
Bentley	1	2014
Shaw	1	2012
Clayton State	1	2011
Emporia State	1	2010
Southern Connecticut	1	2007
Washburn	1	2005
Virginia Union	1	1983

=== Former programs ===
Team	Titles	Years
North Dakota State (Note: As of 2025–26, this school is a current member of NCAA Division I.)	5	1991, 1993, 1994, 1995, 1996
North Dakota	3	1997, 1998, 1999
Northern Kentucky	2	2000, 2008
South Dakota State	1	2003
Hampton	1	1988
New Haven	1	1987

== See also ==
- NCAA Division II men's basketball tournament
- NCAA Division I women's basketball tournament
- NCAA Division III women's basketball tournament
- NAIA women's basketball championship
