= Hyslop Sports Center =

Indoor arena in Grand Forks, North Dakota

- Former names: UND Fieldhouse
- Location: 2751 2nd Avenue North; Grand Forks, ND 58203
- Owner: University of North Dakota
- Operator: University of North Dakota
- Capacity: 4,500

Construction
- Opened: 1951
- Cost: $875,000 ($10.9 million in 2025 dollars)

Tenants
- University of North Dakota: men's & women's basketball (1951–2004) volleyball (1976–2004)

Hyslop Sports Center was an indoor arena on the campus of the University of North Dakota in Grand Forks, North Dakota.

The arena held 4,500 spectators and opened in 1951. Hyslop Sports Center was named in honor of William Kenneth Hyslop (1885–1981), a 1906 graduate of the University of North Dakota and major benefactor to the university.

The center was primarily used for basketball and volleyball until the Betty Engelstad Sioux Center opened in 2004. The building's first indoor pool was added in 1955. The center was used principally for indoor track and field and swimming and diving.

The building was demolished in August 2025.
