= Missouri Western Griffons =

- University: Missouri Western State University
- NCAA: Division II
- Conference: The MIAA
- Athletic director: Andrew Carter
- Location: St. Joseph, Missouri
- Varsity teams: 10
- Football stadium: Spratt Memorial Stadium
- Basketball arena: MWSU Fieldhouse at Looney Complex
- Nickname: Griffons
- Colors: Black and gold
- Mascot: Max the Griffon
- Fight song: "Fight On Griffons!"
- Website: gogriffons.com

The Missouri Western Griffons are the sports teams of Missouri Western State University located in St. Joseph, Missouri. They participate in the NCAA's Division II and in the Mid-America Intercollegiate Athletics Association (MIAA).

== Sports sponsored ==
Men's sports	Women's sports
Baseball	Basketball
Basketball	Cross country
Cross country	Golf
Football	Lacrosse
Golf	Soccer
Track and field^{†}	Softball
	Tennis
	Track and field^{†}
	Volleyball
† – Track and field includes both indoor and outdoor

=== Football ===
Football at Missouri is played at Spratt Stadium. The current head football coach is Tyler Fenwick, who has held the position since 2023. Jerry Partridge was head coach from 1997 to 2016, and became Missouri Western's all-time wins leader on September 30, 2006 as the Griffons defeated Truman State University. His current total of 149 career victories ranks third on the MIAA all-time list.

==== Kansas City Chiefs summer training camp ====
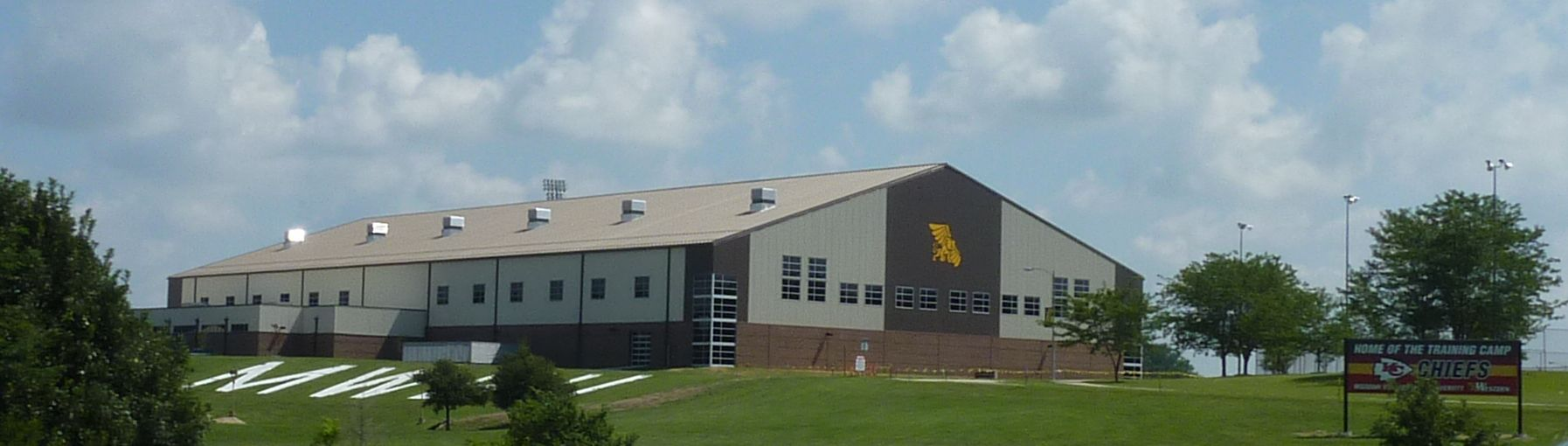
Kansas City Chiefs training camp

The school has been the summer training camp for the Kansas City Chiefs since 2010. The $15.7 million facility was paid for by $10 million from the Chiefs (from state tax credits) and $1.2 million from student fees at Missouri Western, with the rest coming from the City of St. Joseph, Buchanan County and private donations. It was designed by St. Joseph architect firm Ellison-Auxier architects, Inc., which designed the school's Spratt Hall and clock tower.

A climate-controlled, 120-yard NFL regulation grass indoor field, with a locker room, weight room, training room, classrooms and office space was completed in the summer of 2010. This facility is referred to as the "Griffon Indoor Sports Complex".

== Notable alumni ==
MIAA logo in Missouri Western's colors

- Roger Allen III, NFL offensive lineman
- Chris Ball, Northern Arizona University head football coach
- David Bass, NFL defensive lineman
- Michael Hill, NFL running back
- Jonathan Owens, NFL strong safety
- Travis Partridge, CFL quarterback
- Paul Rhoads, college football coach
- Gijon Robinson, NFL tight end
- Larry Taylor, Olympic basketball player
- Greg Zuerlein, NFL kicker
- Michael Jordan, NFL defensive back
- Leonard Wester, NFL offensive lineman
- Sam Webb, NFL Defensive Back
