= Northern Michigan Wildcats =

Intercollegiate sports teams of Northern Michigan University

- University: Northern Michigan University
- Nickname: Wildcats
- NCAA: Division II; Division I (ice hockey, skiing)
- Conference: Great Lakes Intercollegiate Athletic Conference (primary); Central Collegiate Hockey Association (ice hockey); CCSA (Nordic skiing); Great Lakes Valley Conference (Women's wrestling)
- Athletic director: Rick Comley
- Location: Marquette, Michigan
- Varsity teams: 20
- Football stadium: Superior Dome
- Basketball arena: Vandament Arena
- Ice hockey arena: Berry Events Center
- Soccer stadium: NMU Outdoor Fields
- Aquatics center: Physical Education and Instructional Facility
- Lacrosse stadium: Superior Dome
- Other venues: Vandament Arena
- Colors: Green and gold
- Mascot: Wildcat Willy
- Fight song: NMU Fight Song
- Website: nmuwildcats.com
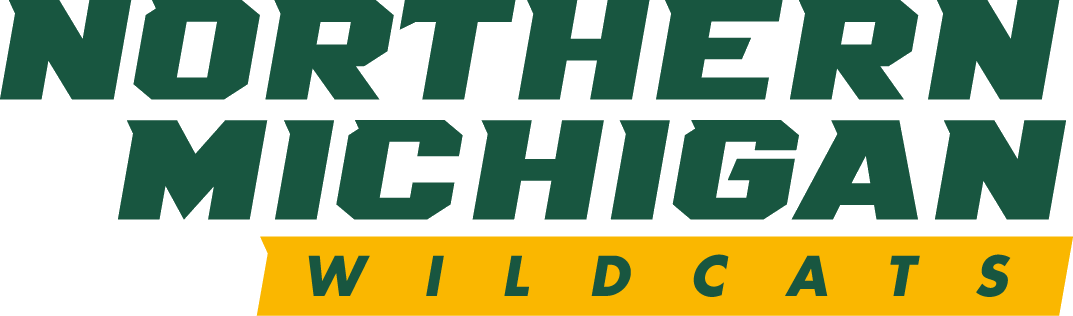

The Northern Michigan Wildcats are the athletic teams that represent Northern Michigan University, located in Marquette, Michigan, in NCAA intercollegiate sporting competitions. All teams that play under NCAA governance compete at the Division II level, with three exceptions. The most significant one is the men's ice hockey program, which plays at the Division I level. Two other sports, Nordic skiing (a coeducational sport with separate men's and women's squads) and women's wrestling (part of the NCAA Emerging Sports for Women program), are de facto Division I sports; The NCAA holds a single skiing championship open to members of all three divisions, and does not currently include women's wrestling in its divisional structure. While NMU's skiing program includes both disciplines contested in the NCAA championships (Alpine and Nordic), only the Nordic program competes within the NCAA structure.

NMU fields three other recognized varsity teams, two of which serve as official U.S. Olympic training centers in non-NCAA sports or disciplines. The Olympic training centers are in weightlifting for both men and women, and the non-NCAA discipline of men's Greco-Roman wrestling.

Northern Michigan University has hosted the National Training Site (NTS) for Greco-Roman wrestling since 1999 as part of its Olympic Training Site. The program has produced multiple Olympians and numerous U.S. World Team members, including Spenser Mango, Alejandro Sancho, Helen Maroulis, Adeline Gray, and Sarah Robles. Most recently, NTS athlete Payton Jacobson was named the 2024 USA Wrestling Greco-Roman Wrestler of the Year after representing the United States at the 2024 Summer Olympics. Jacobson also won the 2025 U.S. Open and earned berths on the Senior World Team, National Team, and U23 World Team, while head coach Andy Bisek was named the 2024 USA Wrestling Greco-Roman Coach of the Year.

In June 2026, the university announced that it would discontinue the National Training Site program effective June 30, 2027, citing evolving conditions in higher education and resource constraints. Existing athletic scholarship agreements will continue to be honored under their original terms and conditions.

The Wildcats compete as members of the Great Lakes Intercollegiate Athletic Conference for 14 of 20 varsity sports, with the men's hockey team playing in the Central Collegiate Hockey Association, and the skiing team competing in the Central Collegiate Ski Association. NMU has been a member of the GLIAC since 1987.

Northern Michigan's rivals in sports action are the two other major schools in the upper peninsula: Michigan Technological University, and Lake Superior State University. The winner of the annual football game between NMU and Michigan Tech is awarded the Miner's Cup.The Cappo Cup is awarded each year to the season series winner between NMU and LSSU, given annually since the 1994-95 season.

== Varsity teams ==
Men's sports	Women's sports
Basketball	Basketball
Football	Cross Country
Golf	Golf
Ice hockey	Track & Field^{1}
Soccer	Lacrosse
Swimming and diving	Outdoor track and field
Wrestling (Note: Competes only in the non-NCAA discipline of Greco-Roman wrestling as one of the United States Olympic & Paralympic Committee's official national training centers.)	Soccer
Track & Field^{2}	Swimming and diving
	Volleyball
	Wrestling (Note: Part of the NCAA Emerging Sports for Women program.)
Co-ed sports
Weightlifting (Note: An official USOPC training center for this non-NCAA sport.)
Skiing (Note: NCAA-recognized sport with a single coeducational team championship. NMU fields separate men's and women's squads, with all races involving members of the same sex. Also, although the NCAA championships involve both Alpine and Nordic disciplines, NMU competes within the NCAA only in Nordic.)
^{1}: indoor – ^{2}: outdoor

== Club teams ==
Men's sports	Women's sports	Co-ed sports
Basketball	Dance	Esports (Note: In 2022 the Esports team got demoted to a Club program from a Varsity program)
Ice Hockey	Ice Hockey	Rowing
Golf	Figure Skating	Cross Country
Lacrosse	Lacrosse	Cycling
Soccer	Rugby	Sailing
Rugby	Soccer	Ultimate Frisbee
Volleyball	Softball	Hip Hop Dance Crew
	Volleyball	Nordic Ski
	Dance	

== Varsity team national championships ==
National Championships (4):

- 1975 – Football – NCAA Division II - 1975 Northern Michigan Wildcats football team
- 1991 – Men's Ice Hockey – NCAA Division I
- 1993 – Women's Volleyball – NCAA Division II
- 1994 – Women's Volleyball – NCAA Division II

National Runners-up (4):

- 1980 – Men's Ice Hockey – NCAA Division I
- 1992 – Women's Swimming and Diving – NCAA Division II
- 1992 – Women's Volleyball – NCAA Division II
- 1995 – Women's Volleyball – NCAA Division II

Basketball Final Four (2):

- 1961 – Men's Basketball – NAIA Division I
- 1998 – Women's Basketball – NCAA Division II

== Club team national championships ==
National Championships (1):

- Spring 2024 – Esports (Rocket League) – NACE Open+ Champ 3 and Below

Nationals Appearances:

- 2024 – Women's Hockey – ACHA Division 2

== Facilities ==
The Division II football team plays in the world's largest wooden dome, the Superior Dome.

=== OTS ===
The United States Olympic Training Site on the campus of Northern Michigan University is one of 16 Olympic training sites in the country. The NMU-OTS provides secondary and post-secondary educational opportunities for athletes while offering training.

With more than 70 resident athletes and coaches, the NMU-OTS is the second-largest Olympic training center in the United States, in terms of residents, behind Colorado Springs. The USOEC has more residential athletes than the Lake Placid and Chula Vista sites combined. Over the years, it has grown into a major contributor to the U.S. Olympic movement.

Current resident training programs include Greco-Roman wrestling and weightlifting. Athletes must be approved by the NMU-OTS, their national governing body and NMU to be admitted into the program.

NMU-OTS athletes attend NMU while training in their respective sports. The student athletes receive free or reduced room and board, access to world-class training facilities as well as sports medicine and sports science services, academic tutoring, and a waiver of out-of-state tuition fees by NMU. Although athletes are responsible for tuition at the in-state rate, they may receive the B.J. Stupak Scholarship to help cover expenses.

On-campus NMU-OTS athletes live in NMU's Meyland Hall, eat in campus dining halls, and train at the university's Superior Dome.

The NMU-OTS also offers a variety of short-term training camps; regional, national, and international competitions; coaches and officials education clinics; and an educational program for retired Olympians.

== Alumni ==
- Lloyd Carr, former head coach at the University of Michigan
- Jessie Diggins, Olympic gold medalist in cross-country skiing.
- Jerry Glanville, former NFL coach
- Mark Maddox, former NFL player for the Buffalo Bills and Arizona Cardinals
- Damian Matacz, professional basketball player
- Steve Mariucci, former head coach of the Detroit Lions and San Francisco 49ers
- Robert Saleh, Former head Coach of the New York Jets played football for NMU.
- Len St. Jean, former NFL player for the Boston/New England Patriots
- Tom Izzo, Michigan State coach played basketball at NMU
- Steve Avery, former NFL player for the Houston Oilers, Green Bay Packers and Pittsburgh Steelers
- Jake Witt, Former NFL player for the Indianapolis Colts.
- Tim Kearney, Former NFL player and Captain for the St. Louis Cardinals
- Jan Quarless PhD, Former Head Coach at Eastern Michigan and Southern Illinois
