= RMAC men's basketball tournament =

RMAC Men's Basketball Tournament
- Conference basketball championship
- Sport: Basketball
- Conference: Rocky Mountain Athletic Conference
- Number of teams: 8
- Format: Single-elimination tournament
- Current stadium: Auraria Event Center
- Current location: Denver, CO
- Played: 1993–present
- Current champion: Black Hills State (2nd)
- Most championships: MSU Denver (11)
- Official website: RMAC men's basketball

The Rocky Mountain Athletic Conference Men's Basketball Tournament is the annual conference basketball championship tournament for the Rocky Mountain Athletic Conference. The tournament has been held every year since 1993, when the RMAC became an NCAA (National Collegiate Athletic Association) Division II conference. It is a single-elimination tournament and seeding is based on regular season records.

The winner receives the RMAC's automatic bid to the NCAA Men's Division II Basketball Championship.

== Tournament format ==
Since its foundation in 1993, the tournament has featured only the top 8 teams from the conference playing in a single-elimination style tournament. The first rounds are always played at the gym of the higher-seeded team while the semifinal and championship rounds are played at a pre-determined site, usually on the campus of one of the RMAC (Rocky Mountain Athletic Conference) members.

== Results ==
Year	Champions	Score	Runner-up	Tournament MVP	Venue
1993	Western State	78–64	Mesa State	–	Paul Wright Gymnasium (Gunnison, CO)
1994	Fort Hays State	81–79	Mesa State	Dennis Edwards (Fort Hays State)	Auraria Event Center (Denver, CO)
1995	Fort Hays State	84–70	Mesa State	Chad Baar (Mesa State)	Auraria Event Center (Denver, CO)
1996	Fort Hays State	85–79	Nebraska–Kearney	Alonzo Goldston (Fort Hays State)	Auraria Event Center (Denver, CO)
1997	Fort Hays State	83–79 ^{OT}	Nebraska–Kearney	Alonzo Goldston (Fort Hays State)	Auraria Event Center (Denver, CO)
1998	Nebraska–Kearney	85–62	Southern Colorado	Mike Hancock (Nebraska–Kearney)	Auraria Event Center (Denver, CO)
1999	Metro State	83–73	Mesa State	DeMarcos Anzures (Metro State)	Auraria Event Center (Denver, CO)
2000	Metro State	82–66	Mesa State	Lee Barlow (Metro State)	Magness Arena (Denver, CO)
2001	Metro State	94–85	Nebraska–Kearney	Kane Oakley (Metro State)	Magness Arena (Denver, CO)
2002	Fort Lewis	71–70 ^{OT}	Nebraska–Kearney	Trevor Lorz (Fort Lewis)	Magness Arena (Denver, CO)
2003	Metro State	79–69	Fort Hays State	Patrick Mutombo (Metro State)	Broadmoor World Arena (Colorado Springs, CO)
2004	Metro State	99–78	Nebraska–Kearney	C. J. Massingale (Metro State)	Broadmoor World Arena (Colorado Springs, CO)
2005	Metro State	66–57	Mesa State	Mark Worthington (Metro State)	Broadmoor World Arena (Colorado Springs, CO)
2006	Nebraska–Kearney	71–68	Metro State	Dusty Jura (Nebraska–Kearney)	Massari Arena (Pueblo, CO)
2007	Metro State	70–60	Adams State	Jesse Wagstaff (Metro State)	Massari Arena (Pueblo, CO)
2008	Fort Lewis	79–73	Colorado Christian	Tim Crowell (Fort Lewis)	Massari Arena (Pueblo, CO)
2009	Metro State	84–78	Fort Lewis	Jesse Wagstaff (Metro State)	Massari Arena (Pueblo, CO)
2010	Metro State	83–79	New Mexico Highlands	Donte Nicholas (Metro State)	Massari Arena (Pueblo, CO)
2011	Fort Lewis	72–67	Colorado Mines	Daniel Steffensen (Fort Lewis)	Massari Arena (Pueblo, CO)
2012	Colorado Mines	82–62	Colorado Mesa	Dale Minschwaner (Colorado Mines)	Massari Arena (Pueblo, CO)
2013	Metro State	61–60	Fort Lewis	Brandon Jefferson (Metro State)	Auraria Event Center (Denver, CO)
2014	Metro State	77–71	UC Colorado Springs	Nick Kay (Metro State)	Auraria Event Center (Denver, CO)
2015	UC Colorado Springs	82–65	Metro State	Derrick White (UC Colorado Springs)	Auraria Event Center (Denver, CO)
2016	Fort Lewis	73–72	Colorado Mines	Joshua Blaylock (Fort Lewis)	Whalen Gymnasium (Durango, CO)
2017	Colorado Mines	102–98 ^{OT}	Fort Lewis	Gokul Natesan (Colorado Mines)	Lockridge Arena (Golden, CO)
2018	Regis	88–80	Fort Lewis	Jarrett Brodbeck (Regis)	Whalen Gymnasium (Durango, CO)
2019	New Mexico Highlands	79-66	Black Hills State	Gerard Davis (New Mexico Highlands)	Lockridge Arena (Golden, CO)
2020	Colorado Mesa	69–61	Colorado Mines	Tommy Nuno (Colorado Mesa)	Burns Arena (St. George, UT)
2021	Colorado Mesa	75–74 (OT)	Colorado Mines	Ethan Menzies (Colorado Mesa)	Brownson Arena (Grand Junction, CO)
2022	Black Hills State	69–66	Regis	Donald E. Young Center (Black Hills State)	Donald E. Young Center (Spearfish, SD)
2023	Fort Lewis	82–76	Colorado Mines	Akuel Kot (Fort Lewis)	Brownson Arena (Grand Junction, CO)
2024	Fort Lewis	86–75	Colorado Mines	Obi Agbim (Fort Lewis)	Brownson Arena (Grand Junction, CO)
2025	Colorado Mines	92-64	Regis	Majok Deng (Colorado Mines)	Lockridge Arena (Golden, CO)
2026	Black Hills State	89–77	Colorado Mines	Jackson Seale (Black Hills State)	A2 Arena (Spearfish, SD)

== Championship appearances by school ==
School	Finals Record	Finals Appearances	Years
MSU Denver (Metro State)	11–2	13	1999, 2000, 2001, 2003, 2004, 2005, 2007, 2009, 2010, 2013, 2014
Fort Lewis	6–4	10	2002, 2008, 2011, 2016, 2023, 2024
Fort Hays State^{‡}	4–1	5	1994, 1995, 1996, 1997
Colorado Mines	3–5	8	2012, 2017, 2025
Colorado Mesa	2–8	10	2020, 2021
Nebraska–Kearney^{‡}	2–5	7	1998, 2006
Black Hills State	2–1	3	2022, 2026
Regis	1–1	2	2018
New Mexico Highlands	1–1	2	2019
UCCS (UC Colorado Springs)	1–1	2	2015
Western Colorado (Western State)	1–0	1	1993
Colorado Christian	0–1	1	
Adams State	0–1	1	
CSU Pueblo	0–1	1	

- Chadron State, South Dakota Mines, and Westminster have yet to advance to the RMAC tournament final.
- Utah Tech (Dixie State) and Western New Mexico never qualified for the RMAC tournament final before departing the conference.
- ^{‡}Former member of the RMAC.

== See also ==
- RMAC women's basketball tournament
