= NCAA Division II men's soccer tournament appearances by school =

The following is a list of National Collegiate Athletic Association (NCAA) Division II college soccer teams that have qualified for the NCAA Division II men's soccer tournament through the 2025 tournament with teams listed by number of appearances. From 1959 through 1971, the NCAA had only one division for soccer; the Division II tournament was started in 1972, and the Division III tourney followed in 1974.

All programs are listed with their current athletic brand names, which do not always match those in use in a specific season.

(Current through 2025 tournament)

NCAA Division II Men's Soccer Championship
School	Appearances	Years	Active Streak	Debut	Last	Best Result
Seattle Pacific	36	1972, 1973, 1974, 1975, 1976, 1977, 1978, 1979, 1980, 1981, 1983, 1984, 1985, 1986, 1987, 1988, 1990, 1991, 1992, 1993, 1994, 1995, 1996, 1997, 1998, 1999, 2000, 2005, 2006, 2011, 2012, 2013, 2014, 2015, 2021, 2025	1 (2025)	1972	2025	Champions (1978, 1983, 1985, 1986, 1993)
Southern Connecticut	32	1976, 1977, 1978, 1979, 1980, 1981, 1982, 1983, 1985, 1986, 1987, 1988, 1989, 1990, 1992, 1993, 1994, 1995, 1996, 1997, 1998, 1999, 2001, 2002, 2003, 2004, 2006, 2007, 2009, 2010, 2014, 2017	–	1976	2017	Champions (1987, 1990, 1992, 1995, 1998, 1999)
Tampa	27	1980, 1981, 1982, 1983, 1984, 1986, 1987, 1988, 1989, 1990, 1991, 1992, 1993, 1994, 1995, 1996, 1997, 2001, 2007, 2008, 2009, 2010, 2012, 2016, 2017, 2021, 2022	–	1980	2022	Champions (1981, 1994, 2001)
Franklin Pierce	25	1991, 1992, 1993, 1994, 1995, 1996, 1997, 1998, 2003, 2004, 2005, 2006, 2007, 2008, 2009, 2010, 2011, 2012, 2016, 2019, 2021, 2022, 2023, 2024, 2025	6 (2019–present)	1991	2025	Champions (2007, 2022, 2023)
Southern New Hampshire	25	1986, 1987, 1988, 1989, 1990, 1992, 1995, 1997, 1998, 1999, 2000, 2002, 2006, 2008, 2009, 2010, 2011, 2012, 2013, 2014, 2015, 2016, 2023, 2024, 2025	3 (2023–present)	1986	2025	Champions (1989, 2013)
Lynn	21	1996, 1997, 1998, 1999, 2001, 2003, 2005, 2006, 2007, 2008, 2009, 2011, 2012, 2014, 2016, 2017, 2018, 2019, 2023, 2024, 2025	3 (2023–present)	1996	2025	Champions (2003, 2012, 2014)
Midwestern State	20	2002, 2003, 2006, 2007, 2008, 2009, 2010, 2011, 2013, 2014, 2015, 2016, 2017, 2018, 2019, 2021, 2022, 2023, 2024, 2025	12 (2013–present)	2002	2025	Champions (2025)
East Stroudsburg	20	1972, 1973, 1974, 1985, 1986, 1987, 1989, 1994, 1995, 1997, 1998, 1999, 2000, 2001, 2002, 2003, 2006, 2007, 2008, 2017	–	1972	2017	Semifinals (2000)
Cal State Los Angeles	18	1981, 1992, 1994, 2006, 2008, 2009, 2011, 2012, 2013, 2014, 2015, 2017, 2019, 2021, 2022, 2023, 2024, 2025	6 (2019–present)	1981	2025	Champions (2021)
Cal State Dominguez Hills	17	1982, 2000, 2001, 2002, 2003, 2004, 2005, 2006, 2007, 2008, 2009, 2011, 2015, 2017, 2022, 2024, 2025	2 (2024–present)	1982	2025	Champions (2000, 2008)
Rollins	17	1973, 1976, 1978, 1979, 1981, 1982, 2003, 2004, 2006, 2009, 2010, 2011, 2012, 2013, 2015, 2022, 2025	1 (2025)	1973	2025	Runners-up (2010, 2025)
Missouri–St. Louis	17	1972, 1973, 1974, 1975, 1976, 1977, 1978, 1979, 1980, 1981, 1982, 1983, 1984, 1985, 1987, 1988, 1991	–	1972	1991	Champions (1973)
Mercyhurst	16	1995, 1996, 1998, 2000, 2001, 2002, 2003, 2006, 2009, 2010, 2011, 2012, 2013, 2014, 2016, 2022	–	1995	2022	Semifinals (2012)
Charleston (WV)	15	1999, 2009, 2010, 2012, 2014, 2015, 2016, 2017, 2018, 2019, 2021, 2022, 2023, 2024, 2025	11 (2014–present)	1999	2025	Champions (2017, 2019)
Gannon	14	1984, 1985, 1986, 1988, 1989, 1990, 1993, 2007, 2012, 2019, 2021, 2023, 2024, 2025	3 (2023–present)	1984	2025	Semifinals (1990, 1991, 1993)
Chico State	14	1972, 1976, 1977, 1978, 1980, 1981, 1986, 1992, 2003, 2010, 2011, 2013, 2018, 2023	–	1972	2023	Runners-up (2003)
Lander	14	1996, 2001, 2005, 2006, 2007, 2008, 2009, 2012, 2013, 2015, 2016, 2017, 2018, 2022	–	1996	2022	Quarterfinals (2001, 2005)
Oakland	14	1976, 1982, 1983, 1984, 1986, 1987, 1988, 1989, 1990, 1991, 1992, 1993, 1994, 1996	–	1976	1996	Runners-up (1986, 1994, 1996)
Florida Tech	13	1987, 1988, 1989, 1990, 1991, 1992, 1993, 1994, 2016, 2019, 2022, 2023, 2025	1 (2025)	1987	2025	Champions (1988, 1991)
Fort Lewis	13	1997, 1998, 1999, 2001, 2004, 2005, 2006, 2007, 2008, 2009, 2011, 2023, 2024	–	1997	2024	Champions (2005, 2009, 2011)
LIU Post (Note: In July 2019, after LIU Post's final tournament appearance, Long Island University merged the Post athletic program with the Division I program of the university's Brooklyn campus, creating a D-I program that now competes as the LIU Sharks. The merged men's soccer team inherited Brooklyn's history and records.)	13	1976, 1987, 1993, 1994, 2006, 2011, 2012, 2013, 2014, 2015, 2016, 2017, 2018	–	1976	2018	Quarterfinals (1987, 1993, 2014, 2015, 2017)
Dowling	13	1996, 1997, 1998, 2000, 2001, 2003, 2004, 2005, 2006, 2007, 2008, 2010, 2013	–	1996	2013	Champions (2006)
West Florida	12	1998, 2006, 2007, 2008, 2010, 2013, 2019, 2021, 2022, 2023, 2024, 2025	6 (2019–present)	1998	2025	Semifinals (2006)
Lewis	12	2000, 2001, 2002, 2004, 2007, 2008, 2009, 2013, 2021, 2022, 2023, 2024	–	2000	2024	Semifinals (2000, 2009, 2023)
Limestone	12	2006, 2008, 2013, 2014, 2015, 2016, 2017, 2018, 2019, 2021, 2023, 2024	–	2006	2024	Quarterfinals (2023)
Wingate	12	1999, 2007, 2009, 2010, 2012, 2014, 2015, 2016, 2017, 2019, 2022, 2023	–	1999	2023	Champions (2016)
Barry	12	1985, 1988, 1989, 2000, 2002, 2003, 2009, 2010, 2011, 2018, 2022, 2023	–	1985	2023	Champions (2018)
Lock Haven	12	1973, 1980, 1981, 1983, 1984, 1986, 1987, 1988, 1992, 2004, 2006, 2021	–	1973	2021	Champions (1980)
Adelphi	11	1972, 1973, 1974, 1975, 2015, 2016, 2017, 2018, 2019, 2022, 2025	1 (2025)	1972	2025	Champions (1974)
Fort Hays State	11	2012, 2013, 2014, 2015, 2016, 2017, 2018, 2019, 2021, 2024, 2025	2 (2024–present)	2012	2025	Semifinals (2025)
Rockhurst	11	2002, 2003, 2005, 2008, 2011, 2012, 2013, 2015, 2016, 2017, 2025	1 (2025)	2002	2025	Semifinals (2013, 2015, 2016, 2017)
Colorado Mines	11	2005, 2009, 2010, 2012, 2013, 2015, 2017, 2018, 2019, 2021, 2022	–	2005	2022	Quarterfinals (2015)
Cal Poly Pomona	10	1998, 2015, 2016, 2017, 2018, 2019, 2021, 2022, 2023, 2024	–	1998	2024	Semifinals (2015, 2017, 2018)
Sonoma State	10	1990, 1991, 1993, 2002, 2005, 2007, 2008, 2009, 2010, 2016	–	1990	2016	Champions (2002)
USC Upstate	10	1991, 1992, 1993, 1994, 1995, 1997, 1998, 2002, 2003, 2006	–	1991	2006	Runners-up (1995, 1998)
Bridgeport	9	1972, 1982, 1984, 1986, 1988, 1990, 1991, 2007, 2025	1 (2025)	1972	2025	Semifinals (1986)
Post	9	2012, 2013, 2018, 2019, 2021, 2022, 2023, 2024, 2025	7 (2018–present)	2012	2025	Third round (2022, 2023, 2024)
Tiffin	9	2013, 2014, 2016, 2018, 2019, 2022, 2023, 2024, 2025	4 (2022–present)	2013	2025	Third round (2024)
New Haven	9	1972, 1975, 1976, 1977, 1978, 1981, 1983, 1984, 2024	–	1972	2024	Runners-up (1976)
Saginaw Valley	9	2011, 2012, 2014, 2015, 2016, 2017, 2018, 2022, 2024	–	2011	2024	Runners-up (2012)
Millersville	9	2008, 2009, 2011, 2013, 2015, 2018, 2019, 2021, 2023	–	2008	2023	Semifinals (2011)
Le Moyne	9	1975, 1977, 2005, 2007, 2008, 2009, 2015, 2016, 2018	–	1975	2018	Semifinals (2000)
Carson–Newman	9	2003, 2004, 2005, 2006, 2007, 2008, 2009, 2013, 2015	–	2003	2015	Runners-up (2013)
Truman	9	1990, 1993, 1995, 1997, 1998, 1999, 2003, 2005, 2010	–	1990	2010	Semifinals (1997)
Indianapolis	8	2013, 2015, 2017, 2019, 2021, 2022, 2023, 2025	1 (2025)	2013	2025	Semifinals (2019, 2021)
Clayton State	8	2000, 2001, 2004, 2005, 2007, 2010, 2023, 2024	–	2000	2024	Quarterfinals (2010, 2024)
Wisconsin–Parkside	8	1994, 2000, 2004, 2006, 2019, 2021, 2022, 2023	–	1994	2023	Third round (2022)
West Texas A&M	8	1997, 2000, 2001, 2007, 2009, 2018, 2021, 2022	–	1997	2022	Quarterfinals (2000, 2001, 2018)
Davis & Elkins	8	1983, 1984, 1985, 1986, 2012, 2017, 2021, 2022	–	1983	2022	Semifinals (1985, 1986)
Queens (NC)	8	1999, 2002, 2004, 2006, 2007, 2013, 2018, 2019	–	1999	2019	Quarterfinals (1999, 2006)
Incarnate Word	8	2002, 2003, 2004, 2005, 2006, 2008, 2011, 2012	–	2002	2012	Quarterfinals (2004, 2012)
SIU Edwardsville	8	1972, 1997, 2001, 2003, 2004, 2005, 2006, 2007	–	1972	2007	Champions (1972)
Cal State East Bay	8	1974, 1975, 1976, 1982, 1983, 1984, 1988, 1989	–	1974	1989	Semifinals (1989)
FIU	8	1977, 1978, 1979, 1980, 1982, 1983, 1984, 1985	–	1977	1985	Champions (1982, 1984)
Eastern Illinois	8	1972, 1973, 1974, 1975, 1977, 1978, 1979, 1980	–	1972	1980	Runners-up (1979)
Flagler	7	2009, 2010, 2011, 2012, 2013, 2024, 2025	2 (2024–present)	2009	2025	Quarterfinals (2011)
Maryville (MO)	7	2017, 2018, 2019, 2021, 2023, 2024, 2025	3 (2023–present)	2017	2025	Quarterfinals (2019, 2023)
Palm Beach Atlantic	7	2015, 2016, 2017, 2018, 2019, 2021, 2025	1 (2025)	2015	2025	Quarterfinals (2015)
Wilmington (DE)	7	2009, 2013, 2015, 2018, 2019, 2021, 2025	1 (2025)	2009	2025	Second round (2013, 2015, 2018, 2019, 2021, 2025)
Young Harris	7	2014, 2015, 2017, 2018, 2019, 2021, 2025	1 (2025)	2014	2025	Quarterfinals (2014, 2017)
Simon Fraser	7	2012, 2013, 2014, 2016, 2017, 2018, 2023	–	2012	2023	Semifinals (2012, 2013)
Lenoir–Rhyne	7	2006, 2016, 2017, 2018, 2021, 2022, 2023	–	2006	2023	Second round (2006, 2016, 2022)
Ashland	7	2001, 2003, 2008, 2009, 2010, 2018, 2022	–	2001	2022	Quarterfinals (2001)
NYIT	7	1985, 2003, 2005, 2007, 2011, 2013, 2014	–	1985	2014	Semifinals (1985)
Montevallo	7	2004, 2006, 2007, 2008, 2010, 2011, 2012	–	2004	2012	Semifinals (2007)
Grand Canyon	7	1992, 1995, 1996, 1998, 2007, 2010, 2012	–	1992	2012	Champions (1996)
CSU Bakersfield	7	1990, 1994, 1995, 1996, 1997, 2001, 2004	–	1990	2004	Champions (1997)
Hartford	7	1972, 1973, 1976, 1977, 1978, 1980, 1981	–	1972	1981	Quarterfinals (1980)
Loyola (MD)	7	1972, 1993, 1974, 1975, 1976, 1977, 1978	–	1972	1978	Champions (1976)
Anderson (SC)	6	2009, 2010, 2011, 2013, 2018, 2025	1 (2025)	2009	2025	Second round (2010, 2025)
Notre Dame (OH)	6	2012, 2013, 2014, 2015, 2022, 2023	–	2012	2023	Second round (2012, 2013, 2014, 2015, 2022)
West Chester	6	2002, 2016, 2017, 2018, 2019, 2023	–	2002	2023	Runners-up (2018)
Colorado Mesa	6	2014, 2015, 2016, 2017, 2018, 2021	–	2014	2021	Semifinals (2014)
Tusculom	6	2004, 2005, 2007, 2008, 2016, 2018	–	2004	2018	Quarterfinals (2004, 2008)
Northeastern State	6	2003, 2004, 2012, 2014, 2017, 2018	–	2003	2018	Quarterfinals (2012, 2017)
Quincy	6	1998, 2010, 2012. 2014, 2015, 2016	–	1998	2016	Semifinals (2014)
Northern Kentucky	6	2006, 2007, 2008, 2009, 2010, 2011	–	2006	2011	Champions (2010)
Cal State Northridge	6	1984, 1985, 1986, 1987, 1988, 1989	–	1984	1989	Runners-up (1987, 1988)
Cal State San Bernardino	5	1991, 2009, 2010, 2019, 2025	1 (2025)	1991	2025	Quarterfinals (2019)
Lincoln Memorial	5	2006, 2007, 2017, 2023, 2025	1 (2025)	2006	2025	Runners-up (2007)
Mercy	5	1979, 1989, 2018, 2019, 2022	–	1979	2022	Second round (1989, 2018, 2019, 2022)
UC San Diego	5	2003, 2013, 2014, 2016, 2019	–	2003	2019	Semifinals (2016)
Merrimack	5	2012, 2014, 2015, 2016, 2017	–	2012	2017	Third round (2014)
St. Edward's	5	1999, 2014, 2015, 2016, 2017	–	1999	2017	Third round (2014, 2016)
West Virginia Wesleyan	5	1996, 1997, 1999, 2010, 2017	–	1996	2017	Quarterfinals (2010)
UMass Lowell	5	2003, 2004, 2007, 2008, 2012	–	2003	2012	Quarterfinals (2008)
Lees–McRae	5	2007, 2008, 2009, 2010, 2011	–	2007	2011	Runners-up (2009)
Metro State	5	2000, 2006, 2007, 2008, 2011	–	2000	2011	First round (2000, 2006, 2007, 2008, 2011)
UC Davis	5	1973, 1975, 1976, 1977, 1999	–	1973	1999	Quarterfinals (1976, 1999)
Western Illinois	5	1973, 1974, 1975, 1976, 1979	–	1973	1979	Quarterfinals (1974, 1976)
Baltimore	5	1972, 1973, 1974, 1975, 1976	–	1972	1976	Champions (1975)
Cedarville	4	2015, 2019, 2021, 2025	1 (2025)	2015	2025	Second round (2015, 2019, 2021, 2025)
McKendree	4	2019, 2023, 2024, 2025	3 (2023–present)	2019	2025	Semifinals (2024)
Point Loma	4	2017, 2023, 2024, 2025	3 (2023–present)	2017	2025	Quarterfinals (2025)
Bloomsburg	4	1978, 2014, 2023, 2024	–	1978	2024	Second round (2014, 2023, 2024)
CSU Pueblo	4	2021, 2022, 2023, 2024	–	2021	2024	Runners-up (2022, 2023)
Francis Marion	4	2000, 2008, 2019, 2024	–	2000	2024	Quarterfinals (2000)
UDC	4	1974, 2002, 2017, 2024	–	1974	2024	Quarterfinals (1974)
Lake Erie (OH)	4	2019, 2021, 2022, 2023	–	2019	2023	Semifinals (2022)
Christian Brothers	4	2000, 2011, 2014, 2022	–	2000	2022	Second round (2014, 2022)
Azusa Pacific	4	2014, 2018, 2019, 2021	–	2014	2021	Third round (2018)
Regis	4	2010, 2012, 2013, 2016	–	2010	2016	Quarterfinals (2013)
Drury	4	2009, 2012, 2014, 2016	–	2009	2016	Third round (2016)
St. Leo	4	2005, 2013, 2014, 2015	–	2005	2015	Third round (2014)
Slippery Rock	4	2005, 2008, 2009, 2013	–	2005	2013	Second round (2008, 2009, 2013)
UNC Pembroke	4	2003, 2004, 2005, 2012	–	2003	2012	Semifinals (2004)
Dominican (NY)	4	2004, 2005, 2009, 2010	–	2004	2010	Second round (2005)
Green Bay	4	1975, 1976, 1977, 1978	–	1975	1978	Semifinals (1975, 1977)
Stanislaus State	3	2012, 2015, 2025	1 (2025)	2012	2025	Third round (2025)
UC Colorado Springs	3	2023, 2024, 2025	3 (2023–present)	2023	2025	Third round (2025)
Mars Hill	3	2011, 2012, 2024	–	2011	2024	Second round (2024)
Southern Nazarene	3	2022, 2023, 2024	–	2022	2024	Second round (2023)
UIS	3	2021, 2022, 2023	–	2021	2023	Third round (2022)
Ohio Valley	3	2017, 2018, 2019	–	2017	2019	Semifinals (2018)
Southern Indiana	3	1982, 2016, 2018	–	1982	2018	Second round (2016, 2018)
Pfeiffer	3	2014, 2015, 2016	–	2014	2016	Semifinals (2015)
Northwood (MI)	3	2011, 2014, 2015	–	2011	2015	Third round (2015)
California (PA)	3	2004, 2008, 2011	–	2004	2011	Second round (2011)
Seattle	3	2004, 2006, 2007	–	2004	2007	Champions (2004)
Catawba	3	2004, 2005, 2006	–	2004	2006	Second round (2005)
Central Arkansas	3	2002, 2004, 2005	–	2002	2005	Semifinals (2002)
Cal Poly	3†	1987, 1989, 1991†, 1993	–	1987	1993	First round (1987, 1989, 1993)
Keene State	3	1983, 1985, 1991	–	1983	1991	Second round, (1991)
Chapman	3	1978, 1979, 1985	–	1978	1985	First round (1978, 1979, 1985)
Alabama A&M	3	1977, 1978, 1979	–	1977	1979	Champions (1977, 1979)
San Francisco State	3	1972, 1977, 1978	–	1972	1978	Quarterfinals (1977, 1978)
Cal State Fullerton	3	1972, 1973, 1974	–	1972	1974	Runners-up (1973)
Springfield	3	1972, 1973, 1974	–	1972	1974	Quarterfinals (1972, 1973, 1974)
Bentley	2	1975, 2025	1 (2025)	1975	2025	Second round (2025)
Rogers State	2	2024, 2025	2 (2024–present)	2024	2025	Quarterfinals (2025)
Western Oregon	2	2024, 2025	2 (2024–present)	2024	2025	Second round (2024)
Auburn–Montgomery	2	2021, 2024	–	2021	2024	Third round (2021)
Coker	2	2021, 2024	–	2021	2024	Second round (2024)
Converse	2	2022, 2024	–	2022	2024	Second round (2024)
Davenport	2	2021, 2024	–	2021	2024	First round (2021, 2024)
Findlay	2	2003, 2024	–	2003	2024	Semifinals (2003)
Westmont	2	1973, 2024	–	1973	2024	Quarterfinals (1973)
Queens (NY)	2	2022, 2023	–	2022	2023	Second round (2023)
Chowan	2	2021, 2023	–	2021	2023	Third round (2021)
Biola	2	2021, 2022	–	2021	2022	First round (2021, 2022)
St. Mary's (TX)	2	2019, 2022	–	2019	2022	Third round (2022)
Northwest Nazarene	2	2014, 2022	–	2014	2022	Quarterfinals (2022)
Ohio Dominican	2	2013, 2021	–	2013	2021	Second round (2013)
Molloy	2	2008, 2021	–	2008	2021	First round (2008, 2021)
Western Washington	2	2016, 2019	–	2016	2019	Second round (2016, 2019)
Fresno Pacific	2	2015, 2018	–	2015	2018	First round (2015, 2018)
West Alabama	2	2015, 2017	–	2015	2017	Third round (2017)
California Baptist	2	2013, 2017	–	2013	2017	Third round (2017)
Lindenwood	2	2013, 2016	–	2013	2016	Quarterfinals (2013)
Urbana	2	2015, 2016	–	2015	2016	Third round (2015, 2016)
Jefferson (Note: Known as the Philadelphia College of Textiles & Science (athletically "Philadelphia Textile") through the 1998 season, and then as Philadelphia University through the 2016 season. In July 2017, PhilaU merged with Thomas Jefferson University, a healthcare-only institution with no athletic program. The merged university chose to operate under the Thomas Jefferson name, and the PhilaU athletic program has since competed as Jefferson.)	2	1972, 2014	–	1972	2014	First round (1972, 2014)
Notre Dame de Namur	2	2008, 2012	–	2008	2012	First round (2008, 2012)
Shippensburg	2	2010, 2011	–	2010	2011	First round (2010, 2011)
Saint Anselm	2	2000, 2001	–	2000	2001	First round (2000, 2001)
UNC Greensboro	2	1989, 1990	–	1989	1990	Runners-up (1989)
UCF	2	1982, 1983	–	1982	1983	First round (1982, 1983)
Marist	2	1978, 1980	–	1978	1980	First round (1978, 1980)
Randolph–Macon	2	1975, 1976	–	1972	1976	First round (1975, 1976)
UC Riverside	2	1974, 1975	–	1974	1975	First round (1974, 1975)
Babson	2	1973, 1974	–	1973	1974	Second round (1973)
Muhlenberg	2	1972, 1973	–	1972	1973	Second round (1972)
Hawaii–Hilo	1	2025	1 (2025)	2025	2025	Second round (2025)
Lincoln (MO)	1	2025	1 (2025)	2025	2025	Third round (2025)
Mississippi College	1	2025	1 (2025)	2025	2025	Quarterfinals (2025)
Northern Michigan	1	2025	1 (2025)	2025	2025	First round (2025)
Roberts Wesleyan	1	2025	1 (2025)	2025	2025	First round (2025)
Concord	1	2024	–	2024	2024	Second round (2024)
Felician	1	2024	–	2024	2024	Quarterfinals (2024)
Cal State Monterey Bay	1	2023	–	2023	2023	Second round (2023)
Purdue Northwest	1	2023	–	2023	2023	First round (2023)
Saint Rose	1	2022	–	2022	2022	First round (2022)
American International	1	2021	–	2021	2021	Second round (2021)
Nova Southeastern	1	2021	–	2021	2021	Semifinals (2021)
Assumption	1	2019	–	2019	2019	Second round (2019)
Bellarmine	1	2019	–	2019	2019	Third round (2019)
Lee (TN)	1	2019	–	2019	2019	First round (2019)
Texas A&M International	1	2019	–	2019	2019	First round (2019)
Spring Hill	1	2018	–	2018	2018	Second round (2018)
Goldey–Beacom	1	2017	–	2017	2017	Second round (2017)
Utah Tech (Note: Played in Division II as Dixie State University, the Trailblazers' former name. Also as three nicknames, Rebels, Red Storm, and Trailblazers.)	1	2016	–	2016	2016	First round (2016)
Upper Iowa	1	2015	–	2015	2015	Third round (2015)
Barton	1	2014	–	2014	2014	First round (2014)
USC Aiken	1	2014	–	2014	2014	First round (2014)
St. Thomas Aquinas	1	2011	–	2011	2011	Second round (2011)
Coker	1	2011	–	2011	2011	First round (2011)
Alliance (Note: Played as Nyack College until the 2021 season.)	1	2011	–	2011	2011	First round (2011)
Missouri S&T	1	2010	–	2010	2010	Second round (2010)
Bloomfield	1	2010	–	2010	2010	First round (2010)
Wheeling	1	2000	–	2000	2000	Quarterfinals (2002)
Purdue Fort Wayne (Note: This program represented the now-defunct Indiana University – Purdue University Fort Wayne, or IPFW. In July 2018, the Indiana University and Purdue University systems dissolved IPFW, with each system establishing a new Fort Wayne campus. The IPFW athletic program, along with its history and records, was transferred to the Purdue-affiliated institution.)	1	1999	–	1999	1999	Quarterfinals (1999)
Southampton	1	1999	–	1999	1999	Quarterfinals (1999)
Alabama–Huntsville	1	1997	–	1997	1997	First round (1997)
Presbyterian	1	1995	–	1995	1995	First round (1995)
Cheyney (PA)	1	1982	–	1982	1982	First round (1982)
UMBC	1	1977	–	1977	1977	First round (1977)
Old Dominion	1	1975	–	1975	1975	Quarterfinals (1975)
UIC	1	1974	–	1974	1974	First round (1974)
WPI	1	1974	–	1974	1974	First round (1974)
Elizabethtown	1	1973	–	1973	1973	Second round (1973)
MacMurray	1	1973	–	1973	1973	Second round (1973)
Albany	1	1973	–	1973	1973	First round (1973)
Merchant Marine	1	1973	–	1973	1973	First round (1973)
Washington (MO)	1	1973	–	1973	1973	First round (1973)
Westfield State	1	1973	–	1973	1973	First round (1973)
SUNY Oneonta	1	1972	–	1972	1972	Runners-up (1972)
Akron	1	1972	–	1972	1972	Quarterfinals (1972)
Hartwick	1	1972	–	1972	1972	Second round (1972)
South Florida	1	1972	–	1972	1972	Second round (1972)
Brockport	1	1972	–	1972	1972	First round (1972)
James Madison	1	1972	–	1972	1972	First round (1972)
Montclair State	1	1972	–	1972	1972	First round (1972)
Binghamton	0†	1973†	–	†	†	†

Schools in Italics no longer compete in Division II.

† = Appearance vacated by the NCAA.

== See also ==
- NCAA Division I men's soccer tournament appearances by school
