= RMAC women's basketball tournament =

Rocky Mountain Athletic Conference women's basketball tournament
- Conference basketball championship
- Sport: Basketball
- Conference: Rocky Mountain Athletic Conference
- Number of teams: 8
- Format: Single-elimination tournament
- Played: 1995–present
- Current champion: Colorado Mesa (6th)
- Most championships: Colorado Mesa (6); CSU Pueblo (6); Nebraska–Kearney (6)
- Official website: RMAC women's basketball

The Rocky Mountain Athletic Conference women's basketball tournament is the annual conference women's basketball championship tournament for the Rocky Mountain Athletic Conference. The tournament has been held every year since 1995. It is a single-elimination tournament and seeding is based on regular season records.

The winner receives the RMAC's automatic bid to the NCAA Women's Division II Basketball Championship.

== Results ==
Year	Champions	Score	Runner-up	Venue
1995	Chadron State	81–80 (OT)	Fort Hays State	Auraria Events Center (Denver, CO)
1996	Nebraska–Kearney	81–64	Mesa State	Auraria Events Center (Denver, CO)
1997	Nebraska–Kearney	103–63	Mesa State	Auraria Events Center (Denver, CO)
1998	Metro State	69–54	Mesa State	Auraria Events Center (Denver, CO)
1999	Nebraska–Kearney	71–48	Regis	Auraria Events Center (Denver, CO)
2000	Nebraska–Kearney	86–74	Regis	Magness Arena (Denver, CO)
2001	Nebraska–Kearney	76–66	Mesa State	Magness Arena (Denver, CO)
2002	Mesa State	67–63	Nebraska–Kearney	Magness Arena (Denver, CO)
2003	Regis	82–64	Nebraska–Kearney	Colorado Springs World Arena (Colorado Springs, CO)
2004	Nebraska–Kearney	59–44	Fort Lewis	Colorado Springs World Arena (Colorado Springs, CO)
2005	Metro State	61–57	Regis	Colorado Springs World Arena (Colorado Springs, CO)
2006	CSU Pueblo	0–0	Colorado Mines	Colorado State Fair Events Center (Pueblo, CO)
2007	Regis	76–62	Metro State	Colorado State Fair Events Center (Pueblo, CO)
2008	CSU Pueblo	70–54	Nebraska–Kearney	Colorado State Fair Events Center (Pueblo, CO)
2009	CSU Pueblo	62–42	Colorado Mines	Colorado State Fair Events Center (Pueblo, CO)
2010	CSU Pueblo	61–60	Fort Lewis	Colorado State Fair Events Center (Pueblo, CO)
2011	Fort Lewis	65–57	Metro State	Colorado State Fair Events Center (Pueblo, CO)
2012	Fort Lewis	87–78	Western State	Colorado State Fair Events Center (Pueblo, CO)
2013	Colorado Mesa	60–47	Colorado Christian	Brownson Arena (Grand Junction, CO)
2014	Colorado Mesa	73–55	Black Hills State	Brownson Arena (Grand Junction, CO)
2015	Colorado Christian	52–44	CSU Pueblo	Brownson Arena (Grand Junction, CO)
2016	CSU Pueblo	72–61	Fort Lewis	Massari Arena (Pueblo, CO)
2017	Colorado–Colorado Springs	53–37	Regis	Massari Arena (Pueblo, CO)
2018	CSU Pueblo	84–69	Black Hills State	Massari Arena (Pueblo, CO)
2019	Colorado Mesa	67–50	Westminster	Brownson Arena (Grand Junction, CO)
2020	Colorado Mesa	60–48	Westminster	Brownson Arena (Grand Junction, CO)
2021	Black Hills State	†	Colorado Mines	Lockridge Arena (Golden, CO)
2022	MSU Denver	76–68	CSU Pueblo	Lockridge Arena (Golden, CO)
2023	Regis	65–61	Colorado Mines	Regis Field House (Denver, CO)
2024	Regis	76–64	UCCS	Regis Field House (Denver, CO)
2025	UCCS	63–61	Colorado Mesa	Brownson Arena (Grand Junction, CO)
2026	Colorado Mesa	92–67	UCCS	Brownson Arena (Grand Junction, CO)

- † Black Hills State was declared champion after the championship game was cancelled due to COVID-19 protocols.

== Championship appearances by school ==
School	Finals Record	Finals Appearances	Years
Colorado Mesa (Mesa State)	6–5	11	2002, 2013, 2014, 2019, 2020, 2026
Nebraska–Kearney	6–4	10	1996, 1997, 1999, 2000, 2001, 2004
CSU Pueblo (Southern Colorado)	6–2	8	2006, 2008, 2009, 2010, 2016, 2018
Regis	4–4	8	2003, 2007, 2023, 2024
MSU Denver (Metro State)	3–2	5	1998, 2005, 2022
Fort Lewis	2–3	5	2011, 2012
UCCS (Colorado–Colorado Springs)	2–2	4	2017, 2025
Black Hills State	1–2	3†	2021
Colorado Christian	1–1	2	2015
Chadron State	1–0	1	1995
Colorado Mines	0–4	4†	
Westminster	0–2	2	
Fort Hays State	0–1	1	
Western Colorado (Western State)	0–1	1	

- Adams State, New Mexico Highlands, and South Dakota Mines have yet to advance to the RMAC tournament final.
- Utah Tech (Dixie State) and Western New Mexico never qualified for the RMAC tournament final before departing the conference.
- Schools highlighted in pink are former RMAC members.

== See also ==
- RMAC Men's Basketball Shootout
