= Pueblo Levee Mural Project =

Mural in Pueblo, Colorado

The Pueblo Levee Mural Project is a mural along a levee of the Arkansas River certified by the Guinness Book of Records as the longest painting in the world. It is a 3-mile long continuous mural located in Pueblo, Colorado. The mural was originally started in the 1970s, according to the city website, when students of nearby Colorado State University–Pueblo began painting over existing graffiti. They worked at night to evade notice by the police, and in the end the work received support from the community; since 1988 it has a dedicated coordinator.

By 2014 the levee itself was in poor condition: 90 years old, it started "bulging and cracking" and needed to be resurfaced, which would destroy the mural.
