= John Massaro =

John Massaro may refer to:

- John Massaro (conductor) (born 1957), American conductor, pianist, composer, and opera director
- John R. Massaro (born 1930), US marine
- John Massaro (guitarist) (fl. 1970s–1980s), Steve Miller Band

== See also ==
- Massari (disambiguation)
- Massaro, a surname
