= Tony Frank =

Tony Frank may refer to:

- Tony Frank (actor) (1943–2000), American actor
- Anthony A. Frank (born 1960), president of Colorado State University
- Anthony M. Frank (born 1931), United States Postmaster General
