= Judith Massare =

Paleontologist

Judith Massare is a paleontologist specializing in Mesozoic marine reptile research. In 1987, Massare published an analysis of plesiosaur feeding habits. She concluded that the long-necked plesiosauroids ate soft prey. Liopleurodon and its relatives, on the other hand, had teeth resembling those of killer whales and probably ate larger, bonier prey. The next year, Massare analyzed Mesozoic marine reptile swimming abilities and found that long-necked plesiosaurs would have been significantly slower than pliosaurs due to excess drag incurred from their large round bodies.

She is a great-granddaughter of Vincent Massari, politician member of the Colorado General Assembly and founder the Colorado State University Pueblo.
