= Massari (disambiguation) =

Massari (born 1980) is a Lebanese-Canadian R&B, pop, and hip hop singer.

Massari, meaning "money" in some other Arabic dialects, may also refer to:

== Places ==
- Massari Arena, a seat multi-purpose arena in Pueblo, Colorado
- Palazzo Massari, also known as the Palazzo Rosso, a palace located on Borso and Corso Porta Mare, in Ferrara, Italy
- Pizzo Massari, a mountain in the Lepontine Alps, located in the canton of Ticino, Switzerland

== Music ==
- Massari (album), a 2005 album by Massari
- Massari: Road to Success, a DVD released by Massari

== People ==
- Ennio Massari Filonardi (died 1565), Roman Catholic prelate, Bishop of Montefeltro
- Ettore Massari (1883–????), Italian gymnast
- Giorgio Massari (1687–1766), prominent late-Baroque Venetian architect
- Giuseppe Massari (1821-1884), 19th century Italian politician
- Jacopo Massari (born 1988), Italian volleyball player
- John Massari (born 1957), American composer and sound designer
- Lea Massari (1933–2025), Italian actress
- Lucio Massari (1569–1633), Italian painter
- Luigia Massari (1810–1898), Italian painter and embroiderer
- Mohammad al-Massari, exiled Saudi physicist and political activist
- Vincent Massari (1898-1976), American politician from Colorado
- William Massari (born 1990), professional Brazilian footballer
