= Mitchem =

Mitchem is a surname. Notable people with the surname include:

- Arnold L. Mitchem, American educator and executive
- Donavan Mitchem (born c. 1989), American activist
- Hinton Mitchem (1938–2013), American politician
