= NCAA Division I men's soccer tournament appearances by school =

The following is a list of National Collegiate Athletic Association (NCAA) Division I college soccer teams that have qualified for the NCAA Division I men's soccer tournament as of the end of the 2025 season, with teams listed by number of appearances. From 1959 through 1971, the NCAA had only one division for soccer, until the Division II tournament was started in 1972, with Division III following in 1974.

== Active programs ==
All programs are listed by their current athletic brand names, which do not always correspond with the program's branding in a given season.

NCAA Division I Men's Soccer Championship
School	Appearances	Years	Active streak	Debut	Last	Best result
Saint Louis	53	1959, 1960, 1961, 1962, 1963, 1964, 1965, 1966, 1967, 1968, 1969, 1970, 1971, 1972, 1973, 1974, 1975, 1976, 1977, 1978, 1979, 1980, 1981, 1983, 1984, 1986, 1987, 1988, 1989, 1990, 1991, 1992, 1993, 1994, 1995, 1997, 1998, 1999, 2000, 2001, 2002, 2003, 2006, 2007, 2008, 2009, 2012, 2014, 2021, 2022, 2024, 2025, 2026	3 (2024-present)	1959	2026	Champions (1959, 1960. 1962, 1963, 1965. 1967, 1969, 1970, 1972, 1973)
Indiana	51	1974, 1976, 1977, 1978, 1979, 1980, 1981, 1982, 1983, 1984, 1985, 1987, 1988;, 1989, 1990, 1991, 1992, 1993, 1994, 1995, 1996, 1997, 1998, 1999, 2000, 2001, 2002, 2003, 2004, 2005, 2006, 2007, 2008, 2009, 2010, 2011, 2012, 2013, 2014, 2015, 2016, 2017, 2018, 2019, 2020, 2021, 2022, 2023, 2024, 2025, 2026	40 (1987–present)	1974	2026	Champions (1982, 1983. 1988, 1998, 1999, 2003, 2004, 2012)
UCLA	51	1968, 1970, 1971, 1972, 1973,1974, 1975, 1976, 1977, 1980, 1983, 1984, 1985, 1986, 1987, 1988, 1989, 1990, 1991, 1992, 1993, 1994, 1995, 1996, 1997, 1998, 1999, 2000, 2001, 2002, 2003, 2004, 2005, 2006, 2007, 2008, 2009, 2010, 2011, 2012, 2013, 2014, 2015, 2016, 2018, 2021, 2022, 2023, 2024, 2025, 2026	6 (2021–present)	1968	2026	Champions (1985, 1990, 1997, 2002)
Virginia	45	1969, 1979, 1981, 1982, 1983, 1984, 1985, 1986, 1987, 1988, 1989, 1990, 1991, 1992, 1993, 1994, 1995, 1996, 1997, 1998, 1999, 2000, 2001, 2002, 2003, 2004, 2005, 2006, 2007, 2008, 2009, 2010, 2011, 2012, 2013, 2014, 2015, 2016, 2017, 2018, 2019, 2022, 2023, 2024, 2025	—	1969	2025	Champions (1989, 1991, 1992, 1993, 1994, 2009, 2014)
Maryland	43	1959, 1960, 1961, 1962, 1963, 1964, 1967, 1968, 1969, 1970, 1976, 1986, 1994, 1995, 1996, 1997, 1998, 1999, 2001, 2002, 2003, 2004, 2005, 2006, 2007, 2008, 2009, 2010, 2011, 2012, 2013, 2014, 2015, 2016, 2017, 2018, 2019, 2020, 2021, 2022, 2024, 2025, 2026	3 (2024-present)	1959	2026	Champions (1968, 2005, 2008, 2018)
Clemson	39	1972, 1973, 1974, 1975, 1976, 1977, 1978, 1979, 1981, 1982, 1983, 1984, 1985, 1987, 1990, 1991, 1993, 1995, 1997, 1998, 2000, 2001, 2002, 2003, 2005, 2006, 2013, 2014, 2015, 2016, 2017, 2019, 2020, 2021, 2022, 2023, 2024, 2025, 2026	8 (2019–present)	1972	2026	Champions (1984, 1987, 2021, 2023)
SMU	38	1979, 1980, 1983, 1984, 1985, 1986, 1987, 1988, 1989, 1990, 1991, 1992, 1993, 1994, 1995, 1996, 1997, 1998, 2000, 2001, 2002, 2004, 2005, 2006, 2007, 2009, 2010, 2011, 2012, 2015, 2017, 2018, 2019, 2022, 2023, 2024, 2025, 2026	5 (2022–present)	1979	2026	Semifinals (2000, 2005)
UConn	37	1960, 1966, 1972, 1973, 1974, 1975, 1976, 1978, 1979, 1980, 1981, 1982, 1983, 1984, 1985, 1987, 1988, 1989, 1998, 1999, 2000, 2001, 2002, 2003, 2004, 2005, 2006, 2007, 2008, 2009, 2010, 2011, 2012, 2013, 2015, 2018, 2025	—	1960	2025	Champions (1981, 2000)
Penn State	35	1970, 1971, 1972, 1973, 1974, 1975, 1976, 1977, 1978, 1979, 1980, 1981, 1982, 1984, 1985, 1986, 1988, 1989, 1992, 1993, 1994, 1995, 1998, 1999, 2001, 2002, 2004, 2005, 2009, 2010, 2013, 2014, 2019, 2020, 2021	—	1970	2021	Semifinals (1979)
Akron	34	1966, 1967, 1968, 1970, 1971, 1975, 1976, 1983, 1984, 1985, 1986, 1998, 2001, 2002, 2003, 2004, 2005, 2007, 2008, 2009, 2010, 2011, 2012, 2013, 2014. 2015, 2016, 2017, 2018, 2021, 2022, 2024, 2025, 2026	3 (2024-present)	1966	2026	Champions (2010)
North Carolina	33	1968, 1987, 1988, 1990, 1991, 1993, 1994, 1999, 2000, 2001, 2002, 2003, 2004, 2005, 2006, 2008, 2009, 2010, 2011, 2012, 2013, 2014, 2105, 2016, 2017, 2018, 2020, 2021, 2022, 2023, 2024, 2025, 2026	7 (2020–present)	1968	2026	Champions (2001, 2011)
Duke	32	1972, 1980, 1981, 1982, 1983, 1985, 1986, 1987, 1989, 1992, 1993, 1994, 1995, 1998, 1999, 2000, 2002, 2004, 2005, 2006, 2007, 2008, 2009, 2010, 2011, 2017, 2018, 2021, 2022, 2023, 2024, 2025	—	1972	2025	Champions (1986)
Washington	31	1972, 1973, 1976, 1978, 1982, 1989, 1992, 1995, 1996, 1997, 1998, 1999, 2000, 2001, 2003, 2004, 2006, 2007, 2012, 2013, 2014, 2016, 2017, 2018, 2019, 2020, 2021, 2022, 2024, 2025, 2026	3 (2024-present)	1972	2026	Champions (2025)
San Francisco	30†	1959, 1961, 1963, 1965, 1966, 1967, 1968, 1969, 1970, 1971, 1973, 1974, 1975, 1976, 1977, 1978†, 1979, 1980, 1981, 1982, 1983, 1984, 1986, 1987, 1991, 1993, 1994, 2004, 2005, 2006, 2008†, 2017	—	1959	2017	Champions (1966, 1975, 1976, 1980)
Wake Forest	29	1988, 1989, 1990, 1991, 1999, 2001, 2002, 2003, 2004, 2005, 2006, 2007, 2008, 2009, 2011, 2012, 2013, 2014, 2015, 2016, 2017, 2018, 2019, 2020, 2021, 2022, 2023, 2024, 2026	1 (2026)	1988	2026	Champions (2007)
Brown	27	1963, 1965, 1968, 1969, 1970, 1971, 1972, 1973, 1974, 1975, 1976, 1977, 1978, 1994, 1995, 1997, 1998, 1999, 2000, 2003, 2005, 2006, 2007, 2009, 2010, 2011, 2012	—	1963	2012	Semifinals (1968, 1973, 1975)
Creighton	27	1992, 1993, 1994, 1995, 1996, 1997, 1998, 1999, 2000, 2001, 2002, 2003, 2004, 2005, 2006, 2007, 2008, 2010, 2011, 2012, 2013, 2014, 2015, 2016, 2021, 2022, 2026	1 (2026)	1992	2026	Runners-Up (2000)
Notre Dame	25	1988, 1993, 1994, 1996, 2001, 2002, 2003, 2004, 2005, 2006, 2007, 2008, 2009, 2010, 2012, 2013, 2014, 2015, 2016, 2017, 2018, 2019, 2021, 2023, 2025	—	1988	2025	Champions (2013)
Stanford	24	1962, 1978, 1991, 1992, 1997, 1998, 1999, 2000, 2001, 2002, 2009, 2013, 2014, 2015, 2016, 2017, 2018, 2019, 2020, 2022, 2023, 2024, 2025, 2026	5 (2022–present)	1962	2026	Champions (2015, 2016, 2017)
South Carolina	23	1979, 1985, 1986, 1987, 1988, 1989, 1990, 1992, 1993, 1994, 1995, 1997, 1998, 2000, 2001, 2002, 2004, 2005, 2010, 2011, 2015, 2016, 2026	1 (2026)	1979	2026	Runners-Up (1993)
St. John's	23	1992, 1993, 1994, 1995, 1996, 1997, 1998, 1999, 2000, 2001, 2002, 2003, 2004, 2005, 2006, 2008, 2009, 2011, 2012, 2013, 2019, 2021, 2025	—	1992	2025	Champions (1996)
South Florida	22	1969, 1970, 1971, 1973, 1975, 1982, 1996, 1997, 1998, 2001, 2005, 2007, 2008, 2009, 2010, 2011, 2012, 2013, 2015, 2016, 2019, 2022	—	1969	2022	Quarterfinals (1997, 2008, 2011)
California	21	1960, 1977, 1981, 1983, 1985, 1986, 1996, 2001, 2002, 2003, 2004, 2005, 2006, 2007, 2008, 2010, 2013, 2014, 2017, 2019, 2026	1 (2026)	1960	2026	Quarterfinals (2005)
Michigan State	21	1962, 1963, 1964, 1965, 1966, 1967, 1968, 1969, 2001, 2004, 2007, 2008, 2009, 2010, 2012, 2013, 2014, 2016, 2017, 2018, 2026	1 (2026)	1962	2026	Champions (1967, 1968)
Portland	21	1988, 1989, 1990, 1991, 1992, 1993, 1995, 1999, 2001, 2002, 2003, 2004, 2007, 2009, 2016, 2018, 2021, 2022, 2023, 2025, 2026	2 (2025-present)	1988	2026	Semifinals (1988, 1995)
Santa Clara	21	1973, 1978, 1979, 1989, 1990, 1991, 1993, 1995, 1996, 1997, 1998, 1999, 2001, 2003, 2004, 2005, 2006, 2007, 2010, 2015, 2021	—	1973	2021	Champions (1989)
Fairleigh Dickinson	20	1963, 1964, 1967, 1968, 1974, 1975, 1982, 1983, 1984, 1988, 1989, 2001, 2002, 2003, 2008, 2012, 2019, 2022, 2025, 2026	2 (2025-present)	1963	2026	Quarterfinals (2001)
Charlotte	19	1991, 1992, 1994, 1996, 1997, 2009, 2011, 2012, 2013, 2014, 2015, 2016, 2018, 2019, 2020, 2021, 2023, 2024, 2026	1 (2026)	1991	2026	Runners-Up (2011)
NC State	19	1981, 1983, 1984, 1985, 1986, 1987, 1990, 1991, 1992, 1994, 2003, 2005, 2009, 2017, 2018, 2019, 2024, 2025, 2026	3 (2024-present)	1981	2026	Runners-Up (2025)
Rutgers	19	1960, 1961, 1983, 1987, 1989, 1990, 1991, 1993, 1994, 1996, 1997, 1999, 2001, 2003, 2006, 2011, 2015, 2022, 2026	1 (2026)	1960	2026	Runners-Up (1990)
San Diego	19	1990, 1992, 1993, 1994, 1995, 1998, 1999, 2000, 2001, 2002, 2003, 2009, 2012, 2014, 2022, 2023, 2024, 2025, 2026	5 (2022–present)	1990	2026	Runners-Up (1992)
West Virginia	19	1966, 1968, 1971, 1972, 1973, 1981, 1992, 2005, 2006, 2007, 2010, 2011, 2018, 2019, 2021, 2023, 2024, 2025, 2026	4 (2023-present)	1966	2026	Quarterfinals (2021, 2023)
Dartmouth	18	1964, 1977, 1978, 1990, 1992, 1997, 2000, 2004, 2005, 2007, 2008, 2009, 2010, 2011, 2014, 2015, 2016, 2017	—	1964	2017	Quarterfinals (1990, 1992)
LIU (Note: All appearances were made by the team that represented Long Island University's Brooklyn campus before July 2019. At that time, LIU merged Brooklyn's athletic program with the Division II program of the university's Post campus. The merged men's soccer team inherited the history and records of the Brooklyn campus.)	18	1963, 1965, 1966, 1967, 1971, 1972, 1973, 1977, 1981, 1982, 1985, 1986, 2004, 2015, 2018, 2021, 2023, 2024	–	1963	2024	Runners-Up (1966)
Coastal Carolina	17	1992, 1995, 2001, 2002, 2003, 2004, 2005, 2010, 2011, 2012, 2013, 2014, 2015, 2016, 2017, 2019, 2020	—	1992	2020	Third round (1992, 2003, 2013, 2017)
Georgetown	17	1994, 1997, 2010, 2012, 2013, 2014, 2015, 2017, 2018, 2019, 2020, 2021, 2022, 2023, 2024, 2025, 2026	10 (2017–present)	1994	2026	Champions (2019)
SIU Edwardsville	17	1969, 1970, 1971, 1973, 1974, 1975, 1976, 1977, 1978, 1979, 1980, 1981, 1982, 2014, 2016, 2023, 2024	–	1969	2024	Champions (1979)
Boston University	16	1980, 1985, 1986, 1988, 1990, 1991, 1993, 1994, 1995, 1996, 1997, 2004, 2007, 2008, 2015, 2023	—	1980	2023	Quarterfinals (1985)
Harvard	16	1968, 1969, 1970, 1971, 1972, 1974, 1984, 1986, 1987, 1994, 1996, 2001, 2006, 2007, 2008, 2009	—	1968	2009	Semifinals (1969, 1971, 1986, 1987)
James Madison	16	1973, 1976, 1992, 1993, 1994, 1995, 1996, 2000, 2001, 2005, 2011, 2014, 2018, 2019, 2020, 2023	—	1973	2023	Quarterfinals (1994, 1995)
Louisville	16	2007, 2008, 2009, 2010, 2011, 2012, 2013, 2014, 2016, 2017, 2018, 2019, 2021, 2022, 2023, 2026	1 (2026)	2007	2026	Runners-Up (2010)
Vermont	16	1975, 1977, 1978, 1981, 1989, 1990, 2000, 2007, 2015, 2016, 2021, 2022, 2023, 2024, 2025, 2026	6 (2021–present)	1975	2026	Champions (2024)
William & Mary	16	1980, 1983, 1987, 1992, 1993, 1995, 1996, 1997, 1998, 1999, 2000, 2002, 2008, 2010, 2013, 2017	—	1980	2017	Quarterfinals (1980, 1996)
Boston College	15	1982, 1990, 2000, 2001, 2002, 2004, 2007, 2008, 2009, 2010, 2011, 2012, 2015, 2016, 2019	—	1982	2019	Quarterfinals (2002)
Kentucky	15	1999, 2000, 2001, 2003, 2012, 2014, 2015, 2016, 2018, 2019, 2020, 2021, 2022, 2023, 2025	—	1999	2025	Quarterfinals (2018)
UC Santa Barbara	15	2002, 2003, 2004, 2005, 2006, 2007, 2008, 2009, 2010, 2011, 2013, 2015, 2019, 2021, 2024	–	2002	2024	Champions (2006)
Air Force	14	1964, 1965, 1968, 1969, 1972, 1977, 1985, 1992, 1993, 1997, 2012, 2017, 2018, 2020	—	1964	2020	Quarterfinals (1968, 1993)
Columbia	14	1970, 1978, 1979, 1980, 1981, 1982, 1983, 1984, 1985, 1989, 1990, 1991, 1993, 2017	—	1970	2017	Runners-Up (1983)
Cornell	14	1971, 1972, 1974, 1975, 1976, 1977, 1980, 1995, 1996, 2012, 2022, 2024, 2025, 2026	3 (2024-present)	1971	2026	Semifinals (1972)
Denver	14	1970, 2008, 2010, 2013, 2014, 2015, 2016, 2018, 2019, 2021, 2022, 2023, 2024, 2025	—	1970	2025	Semifinals (2016, 2024)
Old Dominion	14	1989, 1991, 2002, 2003, 2004, 2005, 2006, 2007, 2010, 2011, 2012, 2013, 2014, 2017	—	1989	2017	Third round (2007)
San Jose State	14	1963, 1964, 1966, 1967, 1968, 1969, 1970, 1971, 1972, 1974, 1976, 1998, 2000, 2003	—	1963	2003	Semifinals (1968)
Seton Hall	14	1986, 1987, 1988, 1990, 1991, 1992, 2001, 2002, 2003, 2004, 2005, 2020, 2022, 2025	—	1986	2025	Quarterfinals (1988, 2020)
Tulsa	14	1991, 2003, 2004, 2007, 2008, 2009, 2010, 2012, 2014, 2015, 2016, 2021, 2022, 2026	1 (2026)	1991	2026	Quarterfinals (2004, 2009)
FIU	13	1991, 1994, 1996, 1997, 2001, 2002, 2003, 2004, 2015, 2017, 2021, 2022, 2023	–	1991	2023	Runners-Up (1996)
Furman	13	1991, 1993, 1999, 2000, 2001, 2002, 2007, 2011, 2014, 2015, 2018, 2024, 2025	—	1991	2025	Semifinals (2025)
Princeton	13	1977, 1979, 1989, 1993, 1995, 1999, 2001, 2009, 2010, 2018, 2021, 2024, 2025	—	1977	2025	Semifinals (1993)
Rhode Island	13	1972, 1976, 1977, 1979, 1995, 1996, 1999, 2000, 2003, 2005, 2006, 2018, 2019	—	1972	2019	Quarterfinals (1979)
UNC Greensboro	13	1993, 1994, 1995, 1996, 1998, 2004, 2005, 2006, 2008, 2010, 2020, 2022, 2025	—	1993	2025	Quarterfinals (2022)
Army	12	1963, 1964, 1965, 1966, 1967, 1968, 1970, 1971, 1972, 1973, 1975, 1996	—	1963	1996	Semifinals (1963, 1964, 1965, 1966)
Cleveland State	12	1969, 1970, 1974, 1975, 1977, 1978, 1979, 1980, 2012, 2022, 2025, 2026	2 (2025-present)	1969	2026	Quarterfinals (1969, 1977, 1980)
Evansville	12	1982, 1984, 1985, 1986, 1987, 1988, 1989, 1990, 1991, 1992, 1996, 2024	–	1982	2024	Semifinals (1985, 1990)
Navy	12	1963, 1964, 1965, 1966, 1967, 1969, 1970, 1971, 1974, 1988, 2013, 2022	—	1963	2022	Champions (1964)
Ohio State	12	2000, 2001, 2004, 2005, 2007, 2008, 2009, 2010, 2014, 2015, 2022, 2024	–	2000	2024	Runners-Up (2007)
Penn	12	1969, 1970, 1971, 1972, 1973, 1977, 2002, 2008, 2010, 2013, 2022, 2024	–	1969	2024	Quarterfinals (1969, 1972, 1973)
Providence	12	1983, 2005, 2006, 2007, 2010, 2011, 2013, 2014, 2016, 2019, 2021, 2024	–	1983	2024	Semifinals (2014)
George Mason	11	1982, 1984, 1985, 1986, 1987, 1989, 1990, 1996, 2006, 2008, 2013	—	1982	2013	Third round (2008)
Howard	11†	1962, 1963, 1970†, 1971†, 1972, 1974, 1975, 1976, 1977, 1980, 1988, 1989, 1997	—	1962	1997	Champions (1974)
Oregon State	11	2002, 2003, 2014, 2018, 2020, 2021, 2022, 2023, 2024, 2025, 2026	7 (2020–present)	2002	2026	Semifinals (2023)
Syracuse	11	1984, 2012, 2014, 2015, 2016, 2018, 2019, 2022, 2023, 2025, 2026	2 (2025-present)	1984	2026	Champions (2022)
Cal State Fullerton	10	1975, 1986, 1993, 1994, 1996, 1998, 2000, 2014, 2015, 2017	—	1975	2017	Semifinals (1993)
Hofstra	10	1968, 2004, 2005, 2006, 2015, 2021, 2022, 2023, 2024, 2025	—	1968	2025	Third round (2021, 2023)
Michigan	10	2002, 2004, 2008, 2010, 2012, 2017, 2018, 2019, 2024, 2025	—	2003	2025	Semifinals (2010)
Milwaukee	10	1979, 1980, 1990, 2001, 2002, 2003, 2004, 2005, 2013, 2020	—	1979	2020	Second round (2002, 2003, 2004, 2005)
Missouri State	10	1997, 1999, 2009, 2019, 2020, 2021, 2022, 2023, 2024, 2026	1 (2026)	1997	2026	Third round (2020)
UCF	10	2002, 2003, 2004, 2010, 2011, 2018, 2019, 2020, 2023, 2025	—	2002	2025	Third round (2019, 2020)
Virginia Tech	10	2003, 2005, 2006, 2007, 2016, 2017, 2018, 2019, 2020, 2021	—	2003	2021	Semifinals (2007)
American	9	1978, 1979, 1984, 1985, 1997, 2001, 2002, 2004, 2020	—	1978	2020	Runners-Up (1985)
Bowling Green	9	1972, 1973, 1992, 1995, 1996, 1997, 2020, 2021, 2026	1 (2026)	1972	2026	Third round (1972, 1973, 1996, 1997)
Butler	9	1995, 1997, 1998, 2001, 2009, 2010, 2016, 2017, 2019	—	1995	2019	Third round (1995, 1998, 2017)
Loyola (MD)	9	1986, 1987, 1993, 2001, 2002, 2007, 2008, 2009, 2021	—	1986	2021	Quarterfinals (1986, 1987)
Loyola Marymount	9	2001, 2002, 2003, 2004, 2009, 2013, 2019, 2020, 2023	—	2001	2023	Quarterfinals (2023)
Northwestern	9	2004, 2006, 2007, 2008, 2009, 2011, 2012, 2013, 2014	—	2004	2014	Quarterfinals (2006, 2008)
Pittsburgh	9	1962, 1965, 2019, 2020, 2021, 2022, 2023, 2024, 2026	1 (2026)	1962	2026	Semifinals (2020)
VCU	9	1997, 1998, 1999, 2002, 2003, 2004, 2012, 2013, 2017	–	1997	2017	Quarterfinals (2004)
Bucknell	8	1974, 1975, 1976, 2006, 2009, 2010, 2014, 2024	–	1974	2024	Third round (1974)
Colgate	8	1959, 1966, 2007, 2008, 2011, 2016, 2017, 2018	—	1959	2018	Third round (1993, 2003, 2012, 2013, 2017)
Marshall	8	2019, 2020, 2021, 2022, 2023, 2024, 2025, 2026	8 (2019–present)	2019	2026	Champions (2020)
New Hampshire	8	1994, 2017, 2018, 2019, 2020, 2021, 2022, 2023	–	1994	2023	Third round (2017, 2023)
Oakland	8	2002, 2003, 2007, 2008, 2010, 2014, 2015, 2021	—	2002	2021	Second round (2007, 2014)
San Diego State	8†	1969, 1981†, 1982, 1987, 1988, 1989, 2005, 2006, 2016	—	1969	2016	Runners-Up (1987)
UAB	8	1994, 1999, 2000, 2001, 2006, 2011, 2012, 2014	—	1994	2014	Quarterfinals (1999)
UC Irvine	8	2008, 2009, 2011, 2013, 2014, 2018, 2023, 2025	—	2008	2025	Third round (2008, 2013, 2014)
UIC	8	1999, 2000, 2006, 2007, 2008, 2016, 2017, 2018	—	1999	2018	Quarterfinals (2007)
Wisconsin	8	1981, 1989, 1993, 1994, 1995, 2013, 2017, 2026	1 (2026)	1981	2026	Champions (1995)
Yale	8	1973, 1986, 1989, 1991, 1999, 2005, 2019, 2023	—	1973	2023	Quarterfinals (1991)
Bradley	7	2000, 2002, 2005, 2007, 2010, 2011, 2013	—	2000	2013	Second round (2007, 2013)
Cal State Northridge	7	2002, 2003, 2004, 2005, 2012, 2013, 2016	—	2002	2016	Third round (2005)
Seattle	7	2013, 2015, 2017, 2019, 2021, 2023, 2024	–	2013	2024	Third round (2015)
Temple	7	1966, 1967, 1968, 1973, 1976, 1978, 1985	—	1966	1985	Quarterfinals (1966)
Charleston	6	1994, 1995, 1996, 2004, 2010, 2026	1 (2026)	1994	2026	Quarterfinals (1994)
Elon	6	2011, 2012, 2013, 2015, 2022, 2025	—	2011	2025	Second round (2013, 2015)
Fordham	6	1996, 2014, 2016, 2017, 2020, 2024	–	1996	2024	Quarterfinals (2017)
George Washington	6	1974, 1977, 1978, 1989, 2002, 2004	—	1974	2004	Second round (1989, 2004)
Kansas City	6	2001, 2003, 2008, 2024, 2025, 2026	3 (2024-present)	2001	2026	Third round (2024)
Lafayette	6	1995, 1998, 2003, 2005, 2012, 2025	—	1995	2025	Third round (1995)
Lehigh	6	2000, 2002, 2006, 2015, 2019, 2026	1 (2026)	2000	2026	Third round (2006)
Mercer	6	2001, 2016, 2017, 2019, 2021, 2023	—	2001	2023	First round (2001, 2016, 2017, 2019, 2021, 2023)
Monmouth	6	2006, 2009, 2010, 2011, 2014, 2020	—	2006	2020	Second round (2009, 2011)
Rider	6	1997, 1998, 2015, 2016, 2018, 2023	–	1997	2023	First round (1997, 1998, 2015, 2016, 2018, 2023)
UMass	6	2001, 2007, 2008, 2017, 2020, 2024	–	2001	2024	Semifinals (2007)
UNLV	6	1983, 1984, 1985, 1987†, 1988, 2014, 2016	—	1983	2016	Third round (1983, 1985)
Western Illinois	6	2004, 2005, 2006, 2009, 2011, 2012	—	2004	2012	First round (2004, 2005, 2006, 2009, 2011, 2012)
Western Michigan	6	2003, 2017, 2022, 2023, 2024, 2025	—	2003	2025	Third round (2017, 2022, 2023)
Winthrop	6	2002, 2006, 2008, 2009, 2012, 2015	—	2002	2015	Second round (2012)
Delaware	5	1968, 1970, 2011, 2013, 2016	—	1968	2016	Second round (2011)
Grand Canyon	5	2018, 2020, 2021, 2025, 2026	2 (2025-present)	2018	2026	Second round (2020, 2025)
High Point	5	2018, 2020, 2022, 2023, 2025	—	2018	2025	Second round (2020, 2022, 2025)
Lipscomb	5	2017, 2018, 2021, 2022, 2023	–	2017	2023	Second round (2022)
Loyola Chicago	5	2006, 2008, 2011, 2016, 2019	—	2006	2019	Second round (2016)
UMBC	5	1999, 2010, 2012, 2013, 2014	—	1999	2014	Semifinals (2014)
UNC Wilmington	5	2009, 2014, 2017, 2018, 2026	1 (2026)	2009	2026	Second round (2009, 2014, 2017, 2026)
Xavier	5	2010, 2011, 2012, 2014, 2023	—	2010	2023	Third round (2014)
Dayton	4	2008, 2015, 2023, 2024	–	2008	2024	Third round (2024)
Drexel	4	1963, 1972, 2012, 2013	—	1963	2013	Third round (1963)
Fairfield	4	2006, 2008, 2011, 2017	—	2006	2017	Second round (2006)
Florida Gulf Coast	4	2011, 2012, 2014, 2016	—	2011	2016	Second round (2016)
Marquette	4	1997, 2012, 2013, 2020	—	1997	2020	Third round (2013, 2020)
Memphis	4	1993, 2004, 2022, 2023	–	1993	2023	Second round (2023)
North Florida	4	2015, 2024, 2025, 2026	3 (2024-present)	2015	2026	First round (2015, 2024, 2025, 2026)
Northern Illinois	4	1973, 2006, 2011, 2021	—	1973	2021	Third round (1973)
Omaha	4	2017, 2020, 2023, 2026	1 (2026)	2017	2026	Second round (2020, 2026)
Robert Morris	4	1993, 1994, 2005, 2024	–	1993	2024	First round (1993, 1994, 2005, 2024)
Saint Mary's	4	2009, 2011, 2018, 2019	—	2009	2019	Quarterfinals (2011)
UC Davis	4	2007, 2008, 2019, 2024	–	2007	2024	Second round (2008, 2019)
Bryant	3	2023, 2025, 2026	2 (2025-present)	2023	2026	Second round (2025, 2026)
Cal Poly	3	1995, 2008, 2015	—	1995	2015	Second round (2008)
Campbell	3†	2007, 2018†, 2019, 2021	—	2007	2021	Second round (2019)
Drake	3	2008, 2009, 2015	—	2008	2015	Quarterfinals (2009)
East Tennessee State	3	2010, 2013, 2016	—	2010	2016	First round (2010, 2013, 2016)
Georgia State	3	2011, 2018, 2021	—	2011	2021	Second round (2021)
Green Bay	3	1983, 2009, 2023	—	1983	2023	First round (1983, 2009, 2023)
Liberty	3	2007, 2011, 2026	1 (2026)	2007	2026	First round (2007, 2011, 2026)
Marist	3	2004, 2005, 2021	—	2004	2021	First round (2004, 2005, 2021)
Pacific	3	2016, 2017, 2018	—	2016	2018	Second round (2016, 2017)
Saint Joseph's	3	1966, 1971, 1972	—	1966	1972	First round (1966, 1971, 1972)
St. Peter's	3	2003, 2007, 2010	—	2003	2010	Second round (2003)
Stony Brook	3	2005, 2009, 2011	—	2005	2011	Second round (2005)
Albany	2	2016, 2017	—	2016	2017	Third round (2016)
Binghamton	2	2003, 2006	—	2003	2006	Second round (2003)
Cal State Bakersfield	2	2011, 2026	1 (2026)	2011	2026	First round (2011, 2026)
California Baptist	2	2022, 2023	–	2022	2023	Second round (2023)
Central Arkansas	2	2017, 2018	—	2017	2018	First round (2017, 2018)
Davidson	2	1992, 2003	—	1992	2003	Semifinals (1992)
Eastern Illinois	2†	1981†, 1982, 1983	—	1982	1983	Third round (1983)
Gardner-Webb	2	2006, 2024	–	2006	2024	Second round (2006, 2024)
Gonzaga	2	2001, 2007	—	2001	2007	First round (2001, 2007)
Iona	2	2019, 2024	–	2019	2024	First round (2019, 2024)
Jacksonville	2†	1998†, 2008, 2020	—	2008	2020	Second round (2008)
Northeastern	2	2002, 2012	—	2002	2012	Second round (2002, 2012)
Quinnipiac	2	2013, 2022	—	2013	2022	First round (2013, 2022)
Radford	2	2015, 2016	—	2015	2016	First round (2015, 2016)
Sacramento State	2	2009, 2010	—	2009	2010	Second round (2009, 2010)
Stetson	2	2005, 2009	—	2005	2009	First round (2005, 2009)
UC Riverside	2	2018, 2022	—	2018	2022	First round (2018, 2022)
Villanova	2	2016, 2021	—	2016	2021	Second round (2021)
Central Connecticut	1	2007	—	2007	2007	Third round (2007)
DePaul	1	2007	—	2007	2007	First round (2007)
Detroit Mercy	1	1996	—	1996	1996	First round (1996)
Florida Atlantic	1	2025	—	2025	2025	First round (2025)
Holy Cross	1	2002	—	2002	2002	First round (2002)
Houston Christian	1	2026	1 (2026)	2026	2026	First round (2026)
IU Indy	1	2000	—	2000	2000	First round (2000)
La Salle	1	1978	—	1978	1978	First round (1978)
Lindenwood	1	2025	—	2025	2025	First round (2025)
Longwood	1	2026	1 (2026)	2026	2026	First round (2026)
Niagara	1	2012	—	2012	2012	First round (2012)
NJIT	1	2019	—	2019	2019	First round (2019)
Presbyterian	1	2017	—	2017	2017	First round (2017)
Sacred Heart	1	2026	1 (2026)	2026	2026	First round (2026)
Siena	1	2025	—	2025	2025	First round (2025)
Utah Valley	1	2015	—	2015	2015	First round (2015)
Wofford	1	2009	—	2009	2009	First round (2009)
Wright State	1	2019	—	2019	2019	Second round (2019)

== Former programs ==
NCAA Division I Men's Soccer Championship appearances
School	Status	Bids	Appearances	Debut	Last	Best Result
Hartwick	Division III	25	1962, 1964, 1968, 1969, 1970, 1971, 1973, 1974, 1975, 1976, 1977, 1978, 1979, 1980, 1983, 1984, 1985, 1986, 1987, 1989, 1993, 1995, 2005, 2014, 2015	1962	2015	Champions (1977)
Jefferson (Philadelphia Textile) (Note: Jefferson made all of its appearances as Philadelphia Textile (in full, Philadelphia College of Textiles & Science). The school changed its name to Philadelphia University in 1999, and merged with Thomas Jefferson University, an institution with no athletic program, in 2017. The merged institution adopted the Thomas Jefferson name and inherited the PhilaU athletic program, which now competes as Jefferson.)	Division II	16	1969, 1970, 1973, 1974, 1975, 1976, 1977, 1978, 1979, 1980, 1981, 1982, 1983, 1984, 1988, 1989	1969	1989	Semifinals (1981)
Fresno State	Discontinued	14	1972, 1982, 1984, 1985, 1986, 1987, 1988, 1989, 1990, 1991, 1993, 1994, 1996, 1998	1972	1998	Semifinals (1986)
New Mexico	Discontinued	12	2001, 2002, 2004, 2005, 2006, 2007, 2009, 2010, 2011, 2012, 2013, 2016	2001	2016	Runners-Up (2005)
Bridgeport	Division II	12	1959, 1961, 1963, 1964, 1966, 1967, 1969, 1971, 1973, 1974, 1975, 1976	1959	1976	Runners-Up (1959)
St. Francis Brooklyn	Discontinued	10	1974, 1976, 1977, 1978, 1982, 2013, 2014, 2016, 2017, 2020	1974	2020	Quarterfinals (1978)
Adelphi	Division II	10	1963, 1969, 1976, 1978, 1987, 1988, 1990, 1991, 1992, 2006	1963	2006	Third round (1963, 1987, 1990)
West Chester (West Chester State)	Division II	8	1959, 1960, 1961, 1963, 1965, 1967, 1968, 1969	1959	1969	Champions (1961)
Alabama A&M	Discontinued	5	1980, 1981, 1982, 1983, 1984	1980	1984	Runners-Up (1981)
Hartford	Division III	4	1991, 1992, 1996, 1999	1991	1999	Quarterfinals ([1996)
Appalachian State	Discontinued	4	1975, 1977, 1978, 1980	1975	1980	Third round (1977, 1978)
Trinity (CT)	Division III	4	1964, 1965, 1967, 1968	1964	1968	Quarterfinals (1964, 1965, 1967)
Cincinnati	Discontinued	3	1998, 2003, 2006	1998	2006	First round (1998, 2003, 2006)
Richmond	Discontinued	3	1990, 1998, 2002	2013	1990	First round (1990, 1998, 2002)
Oneonta	Division III	3	1973, 1974, 1975	1973	1975	Third round (1973)
Colorado College	Division III	3	1966, 1967, 1975	1966	1975	Third round (1975)
Ohio	Discontinued	3	1965, 1971, 1972	1965	1972	Quarterfinals (1972)
East Stroudsburg (East Stroudsburg State)	Division II	3	1964, 1965, 1971	1964	1971	Quarterfinals (1964, 1965)
NYU	Division III	3	1961, 1969, 1972	1961	1972	Second round (1969)
Brooklyn	Division III	3	1960, 1988, 1990	1960	1990	Quarterfinals (1960)
Cortland	Division III	3	1960, 1964, 1966	1960	1966	First round (1960, 1964, 1966)
Chico State	Division II	2	1971, 1974	1971	1974	Second round (1971, 1974)
Buffalo State	Division III	2	1967, 1970	1967	1970	Quarterfinals (1967)
Southern Connecticut State	Division II	2	1969, 1971	1969	1971	First round (1969, 1971)
Middlebury	Division III	2	1965, 1970	1965	1970	First round (1965, 1970)
Brockport	Division III	2	1961, 1968	1961	1968	Second round (1968)
Springfield	Division III	2	1962, 1963	1962	1963	Semifinals (1962)
Towson	Discontinued	2	2001, 2006	2001	2006	Third Round (2006)
North Texas	Discontinued	1	1982	1982	1982	Third round (1982)
Charleston Southern	Discontinued	1	1997	1997	1997	First round (1997)
Illinois State	Discontinued	1	1990	1990	1990	First round (1990)
WPI	Division III	1	1970	1970	1970	First round (1970)
Montclair State	Division III	1	1969	1969	1969	First round (1969)
RPI	Division III	1	1969	1969	1969	First round (1969)
Baltimore	Discontinued	1	1965	1965	1965	First round (1965)
Ithaca	Division III	1	1965	1965	1965	First round (1965)
Franklin & Marshall	Division III	1	1964	1964	1964	First round (1964)
CCNY	Division III	1	1959	1959	1959	Semifinals (1959)
Williams College	Division III	1	1959	1959	1959	First round (1959)

† = Appearance vacated by the NCAA.

== See also ==
- NCAA Division II men's soccer tournament appearances by school
