= Anthony A. Frank =

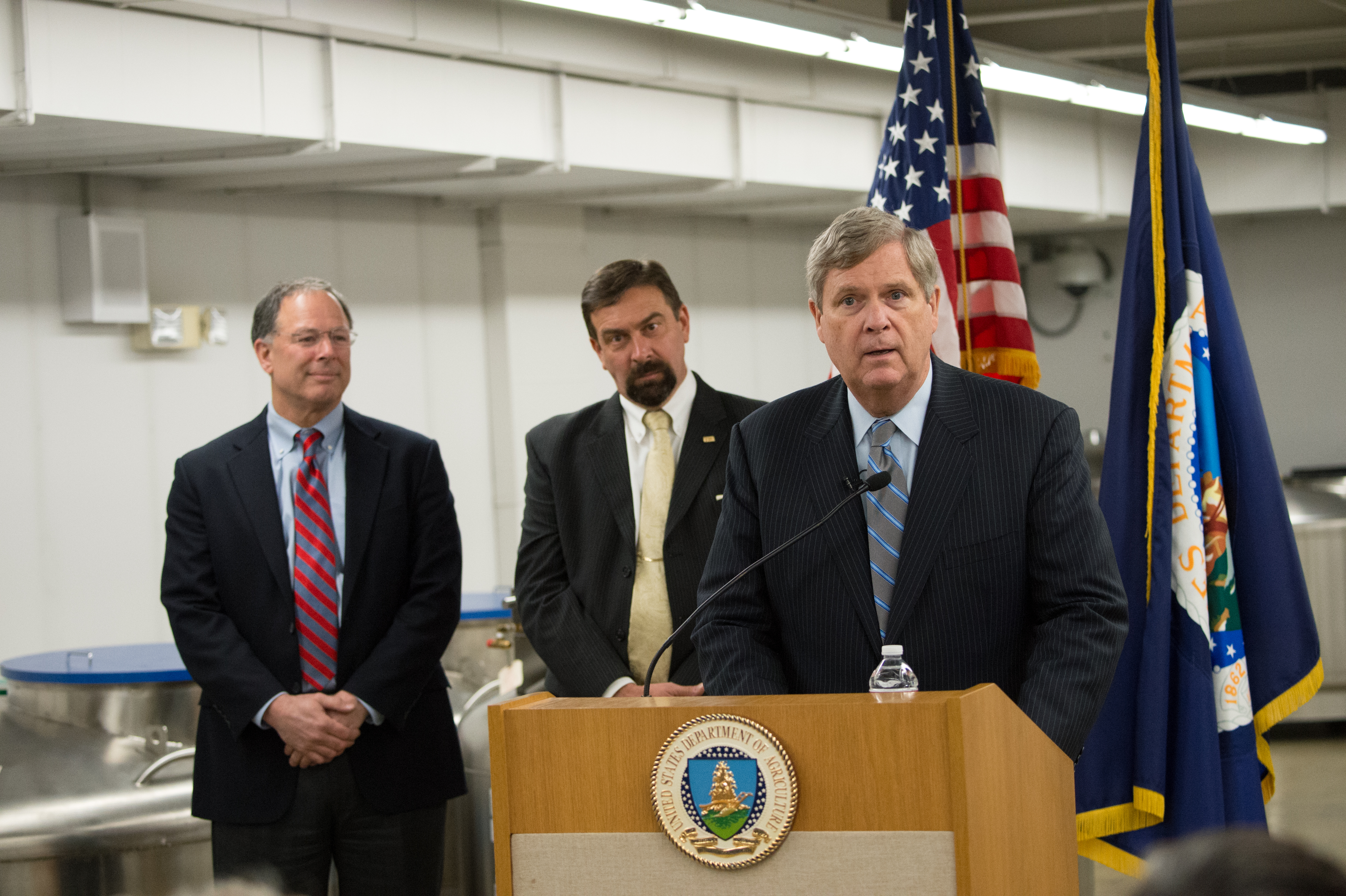

President of Colorado State University
- In office 2008–2019

Chancellor of Colorado State University
- Incumbent
- Assumed office 2015

Personal details
- Born: 1960 (age 65–66)
- Education: Wartburg College; College of Veterinary Medicine (University of Illinois Urbana-Champaign); Purdue University

Anthony Alan "Tony" Frank (born 1960) is the former president and current Chancellor of Colorado State University.

Tony Frank was named president of Colorado State University in 2008 and served as interim chancellor of the Colorado State University System from February 2015-July 2019. He has served as full-time system chancellor since July 2019. The chancellor is the chief executive officer of the Colorado State University System – which includes CSU, CSU Pueblo and the CSU-Global Campus – and is tasked with working with the Board to lead the System's operations, set legislative strategy, serve as the primary spokesperson and increase engagement among alumni, donors and the business community.

Frank has served in a number of capacities at Colorado State since joining the university in 1993, including faculty member, researcher, department chair, associate dean of the college of Veterinary Medicine and Biomedical Sciences, vice president for research, and provost and senior vice president. He was the 14th president of CSU.

On September 30, 2018, Frank announced he was stepping down from his role as president effective July 1, 2019, and moving into the full-time role of Chancellor of the Colorado State University System.

Frank has degrees from Wartburg College, the College of Veterinary Medicine (University of Illinois Urbana-Champaign), and Purdue University.
