= Dax Charles =

American wrestler and coach

Dax Charles is a former NCAA Division II national champion wrestler and current wrestling coach at Colorado State University Pueblo. He has also been elected to the Division II Hall of Fame. In 1992, he became the first winner of a national championship title in the 150 lb class at the then University of Southern Colorado. He has also been awarded All American Honors in 1991, 1992 and 1994 including All American Academic honors in 1994.
