= Derrick White =

American basketball player (born 1994)

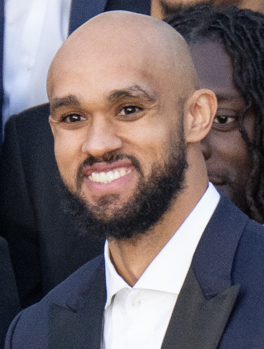
- White at the White House in 2024

No. 9 – Boston Celtics
- Position: Shooting guard / point guard
- League: NBA

Personal information
- Born: July 2, 1994 (age 32) Parker, Colorado, U.S.
- Listed height: 6 ft 4 in (1.93 m)
- Listed weight: 210 lb (95 kg)

Career information
- High school: Legend (Parker, Colorado)
- College: UCCS (2012–2015); Colorado (2016–2017)
- NBA draft: 2017: 1st round, 29th overall pick
- Drafted by: San Antonio Spurs
- Playing career: 2017–present

Career history
- 2017–2022: San Antonio Spurs
- 2017–2018: →Austin Spurs
- 2022–present: Boston Celtics

Career highlights
- NBA champion (2024); NBA All-Defensive First Team (2026); 2× NBA All-Defensive Second Team (2023, 2024); NBA G League champion (2018); First-team All-Pac-12 (2017); 2× NCAA Division II All-American (2014, 2015); 2× First-team All-RMAC (2014, 2015); RMAC tournament MVP (2015); RMAC Freshman of the Year (2013)
- Stats at NBA.com
- Stats at Basketball Reference
Medals
Men's basketball
Representing the United States
Olympic Games
Gold medal – first place	2024 Paris	Team

Derrick Richard White (born July 2, 1994) is an American professional basketball player for the Boston Celtics of the National Basketball Association (NBA). Nicknamed "the Buffalo" or "the Swiss Army Knife" by his Celtics teammate Neemias Queta, he played three years of college basketball in Division II for the Colorado–Colorado Springs Mountain Lions before transferring to Division I's Colorado Buffaloes for his final year.

White was selected 29th overall by the San Antonio Spurs in the 2017 NBA draft. He was traded to the Celtics in February 2022, becoming a key contributor when they reached the 2022 NBA Finals. White became a starter in the 2022–23 season and was selected to his first NBA All-Defensive Team that season and his second the following season. White won his first NBA championship when the Celtics defeated the Dallas Mavericks in five games during the 2024 NBA Finals. White also won a gold medal as a member of the 2024 U.S. Olympic team.

== High school career ==
White attended Legend High School, a brand-new high school in Parker, Colorado, and was a part of its first graduating class. As a freshman on the basketball team, he played with 11 other freshmen en route to a victory in league play. As a senior, White averaged 17.1 points, 3.8 rebounds, 3.1 assists, and 2.1 steals per game.

White scored over 1,000 points in his career. At the time of his graduation in 2012, White was a six-foot combo guard. In February 2023, he was honored as the first-ever Legend Hall of Fame inductee.

== College career ==
White was lightly recruited out of high school, receiving no scholarship offers from any four-year institutions. At the time of his high school graduation, which fell about two months before his 18th birthday, White was barely six feet (1.83 m) tall—after growing 2 inches (5.1 cm) as a senior. The only head coach at a four-year school who showed sustained interest in White was Jeff Culver, then the head coach at the Denver campus of Johnson & Wales University, a non-scholarship NAIA member better known for its culinary program. By the time White was preparing to make his college decision, Culver was hired as head coach at NCAA Division II's Colorado–Colorado Springs and offered White a room-and-board stipend for his freshman season.

Culver only expected White to become a starter late in his college career. He was aware that White's father had a late growth spurt in college, and also knew that doctors had projected White to potentially reach 6 feet 5 inches (1.96 m). As it turned out, White nearly reached that potential height by the time he enrolled at Colorado–Colorado Springs, falling just 1 inch (2.5 cm) short. With his newfound size and athleticism, White became a star at UCCS, starting every game of his three-year career and left as the school's career leader in points (1,912) and assists (343). As a junior, White averaged 25.8 points, 7.3 rebounds and 5.2 assists for the Mountain Lions, leading the team to the 2015 NCAA tournament. He was named an All-American.

Following his junior season, White opted to transfer to Division I Colorado to play for Tad Boyle and test his skills in the Pac-12 Conference, one of the top conferences in the country. After sitting out the 2015–16 season per NCAA rules, White excelled in his lone season with the Buffaloes, averaging 18.1 points, 4.1 rebounds, and 4.4 assists per game. White was named first-team All-Pac-12 and a member of the five-man All-Defensive team.

== Professional career ==
=== San Antonio Spurs (2017–2022) ===
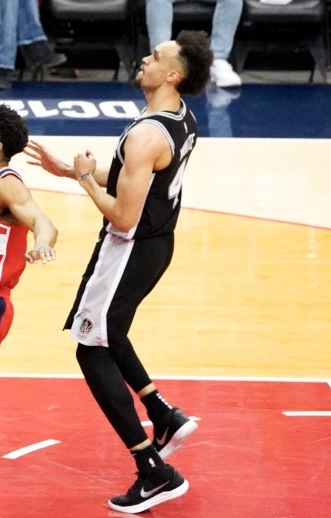
White in 2019

White was one of 60 NBA prospects invited to the 2017 NBA draft combine. He was one of only 15 combine invitees who had not been Rivals top-150 prospects in high school, and one of only three who did not sign with Division I programs out of high school. In addition, according to Yahoo! Sports writer Jeff Eisenberg, White was also "the only one who will use part of his first NBA contract to pay off student loans he accumulated paying for tuition at UCCS as a freshman."

The San Antonio Spurs drafted White with the 29th pick of the 2017 NBA draft. He was later included in the Spurs' 2017 NBA Summer League roster. On July 6, 2017, White signed with the Spurs.

On October 18, 2017, White made his NBA debut, coming off the bench in a 107–99 victory over the Minnesota Timberwolves, yet he recorded no statistics. On October 31, White and Dāvis Bertāns were sent to the Austin Spurs of the NBA G League. White suffered a fractured wrist during a G League game against the Texas Legends. He was later recalled to San Antonio. On March 12, 2018, White scored a career-high 14 points along with four rebounds, an assist, and a block in a 109–93 loss to the Houston Rockets.

On April 14, 2018, White made his NBA playoffs debut, coming off the bench with seven points, an assist, a steal, and a block in a 113–92 loss to the Golden State Warriors in Game 1 of the series.

On October 12, 2018, White was revealed to have a left plantar fascia tear. On November 7, he made his season debut, recording a rebound and three assists in a 95–88 loss to the Miami Heat. On December 31, White scored a career-high 22 points with three rebounds, three assists, two blocks, and a steal in a 120–111 victory over the Boston Celtics. On January 10, 2019, he scored another career-high 23 points with eight assists, five rebounds, two steals, and a block in a 154–147 double-overtime victory over the Oklahoma City Thunder. On January 31 against the Brooklyn Nets, White recorded a then-career-high 26 points as the Spurs won 117–114. On April 18 against the Denver Nuggets, he recorded a then-playoff career-high of 36 points to give San Antonio a 2–1 lead in the first round of the 2019 playoffs.

On December 21, 2020, the Spurs announced that they had signed White to a reported four-year, $73 million rookie-scale extension. On April 1, 2021, against the Atlanta Hawks, he hit a career-high seven three-pointers and finished the 134–129 double-overtime loss with 29 points, three assists, two blocks, and a rebound.

=== Boston Celtics (2022–present) ===
==== 2021–22 season: First NBA Finals appearance ====
On February 10, 2022, White was traded to the Boston Celtics in exchange for Josh Richardson, Romeo Langford, a 2022 first-round pick (which turned into Blake Wesley), and the rights to swap 2028 first-round picks. He made his Celtics debut the following day against the Denver Nuggets and finished the 108–102 victory with 15 points, six rebounds, two assists, and a steal.

During Game 6 of the Eastern Conference Finals against the Miami Heat on May 27, White scored 22 points on 7-for-14 shooting, alongside five assists, three steals, and a block in a 111–103 loss. The Celtics would go on to eliminate the Heat in seven games, earning White his first NBA Finals appearance in his career. In Game 1 of the NBA Finals on June 2, White had 21 points, three assists, and a rebound during a 120–108 comeback victory over the Golden State Warriors. The Celtics went on to lose the series in six games despite a 2–1 lead.

==== 2022–23 season: Transition to starter ====
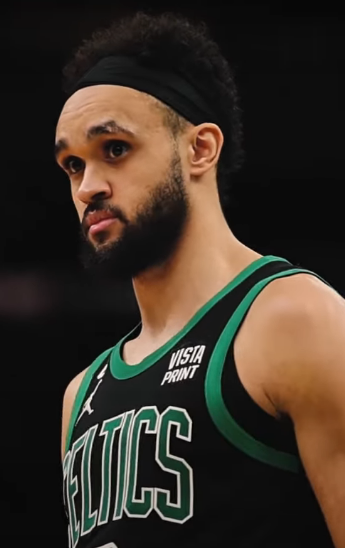
White in 2023

White began the season as a starter for the Celtics. On February 10, 2023, against the Charlotte Hornets, he scored a career-high 33 points in a 127–116 victory. Three days later, White was named Eastern Conference Player of the Week after averaging 24.5 points, 4.8 rebounds, and 7.5 assists as a starter in place of the injured Marcus Smart.

White started in 70 games and appeared in all 82 regular season games, both career highs. He also shot 38.1 percent from three and 87.5 percent from the free throw line, while registering 76 blocked shots (all career highs). In May, White was named to the NBA All-Defensive second team for the first time in his career.

In Game 6 of the Eastern Conference Finals on May 27, White had 11 points, six assists, four rebounds, three blocks, and a steal while making a buzzer-beating put-back shot as time expired to narrowly defeat the Miami Heat 104–103 to force a Game 7 in Boston, saving the Celtics from elimination. He became the second player in NBA history to hit a buzzer-beating game-winner with his team trailing and facing elimination, joining Michael Jordan's "The Shot" in 1989. Two days later, the Celtics went on to lose Game 7 103–84, where White had 18 points, two rebounds, an assist, and a steal.

==== 2023–24 season: First NBA championship ====
White remained a starter after Marcus Smart was traded to the Memphis Grizzlies in the offseason. White's production increased as he averaged 15.2 points, 5.2 assists, and 4.2 rebounds per game. White appeared in 73 games (all starts) and shot 46.1 percent from the field, including a career-high 39.6 percent from three. On March 18, 2024, White recorded his first career triple-double with 22 points, 10 rebounds, and 10 assists in a 119–94 victory over the Detroit Pistons.

During Game 4 of the first round of the playoffs against the Miami Heat on April 29, 2024, White had a playoff career-high 38 points, four rebounds, three assists, and three blocks in a 102–88 road victory. During Game 4 of the Eastern Conference Finals against the Indiana Pacers on May 27, he scored 22 points on 7-for-14 shooting, alongside five steals, four rebounds, four assists, and three blocks while making the game-winning three-pointer as the Celtics completed a 105–102 comeback victory and advanced to the NBA Finals for the second time in three years. White helped the Celtics win the NBA Finals, where they defeated the Dallas Mavericks in five games.

==== 2024–25 season: Contract extension ====
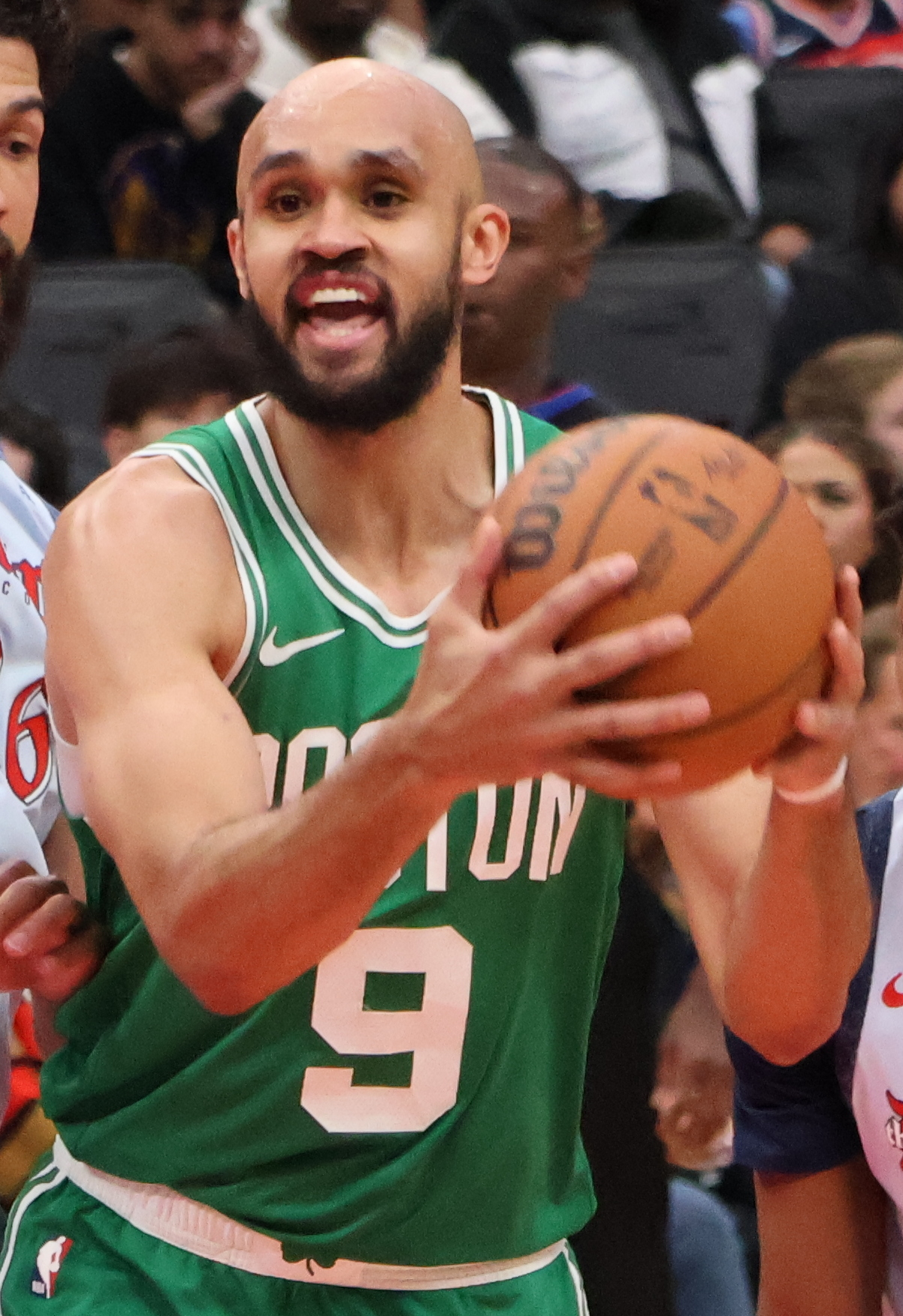
White in 2024

On July 1, 2024, a day before his 30th birthday, White signed a four-year, $125.9 million extension with the Celtics.

On March 5, 2025, White scored a career-high 41 points in addition to recording three steals, three rebounds, two assists, and a block in a 128–118 victory over the Portland Trail Blazers as he and Payton Pritchard became the first Celtics teammates to make nine or more three-pointers in the same game (Pritchard had 10) and the first to score 40 or more points in the same game (Pritchard had 43). They are also the first NBA teammates to score 19 three-pointers in a single game, and the first to have at least 40 points and seven three-pointers each. On March 31 against the Memphis Grizzlies, White had 14 points, eight rebounds, and 10 assists in the 117–103 victory while setting the Celtics franchise record with the most three-pointers in a season, with 246. He finished the season playing and starting in 76 games, marking the first time White started in every game he played during his career as he averaged 16.4 points, 4.8 assists, and 4.5 rebounds per game.

During Game 1 of the first round of the playoffs against the Orlando Magic, White led the Celtics in scoring with 30 points while also recording four rebounds, two assists, and two blocks. In Game 5 of the Eastern Conference Semifinals on May 14, he had 34 points, three blocks, three rebounds, and two assists as the Celtics defeated the New York Knicks 127–102 to force a Game 6 in New York, saving the Celtics from elimination. The Celtics went on to lose the series in six games.

==== 2025–26 season: First All-Defensive First Team selection ====
On December 30, 2025, White had 27 points, seven rebounds, six assists, and a career-high seven blocks in a 129–119 victory over the Utah Jazz. His seven blocks tied George Gervin, Dennis Johnson, Doug Christie, and Tracy McGrady for the most recorded in a game by a guard in NBA history.

On March 3, 2026, the NBA announced that White had been named the Eastern Conference Defensive Player of the Month for February. On April 23, he was named as the recipient of the NBA Sportsmanship Award for the 2025–26 season. On May 22, White was named to his first NBA All-Defensive First Team, while averaging career-highs of 1.1 steals and 1.3 blocks per game.

== National team career ==
On August 24, 2019, White was included in the US national team's final roster for the 2019 FIBA Basketball World Cup.

On July 10, 2024, White was chosen as a member of the 2024 United States men's Olympic basketball team as part of the 2024 Summer Olympics in Paris. Team USA was in need of a replacement player for Kawhi Leonard, who withdrew from the roster that same day. Throughout the tournament, White averaged 3.8 points, 1.4 rebounds, 1.8 assists, 1.4 steals, and 1 block per game. He helped the team win the gold medal.

== Personal life ==
White married Hannah Schneider in August 2021. Their first son, Hendrix James, who is named for Jimi Hendrix, was born on May 19, 2022. Their second son, Daxton, was born on November 4, 2023.

In September 2024, White was attending a Colorado vs. Colorado State football game in Fort Collins when a fan struck him in the back of the head.

== Endorsements ==
White has endorsement deals with the Boston-based beverage companies Samuel Adams and Culture Pop, and has appeared in commercials and on billboards advertising these brands.

== Career statistics ==
Legend
GP	Games played	GS	Games started	MPG	Minutes per game
FG%	Field goal percentage	3P%	3-point field goal percentage	FT%	Free throw percentage
RPG	Rebounds per game	APG	Assists per game	SPG	Steals per game
BPG	Blocks per game	PPG	Points per game	**Bold**	Career high
†	Won an NBA championship

=== NBA ===
==== Regular season ====
Year	Team	GP	GS	MPG	FG%	3P%	FT%	RPG	APG	SPG	BPG	PPG
2017–18	San Antonio	17	0	8.2	**.485**	**.615**	.700	1.5	.5	.2	.2	3.2
2018–19	San Antonio	67	55	25.8	.479	.338	.772	3.7	3.9	1.0	.7	9.9
2019–20	San Antonio	68	20	24.7	.458	.366	.853	3.3	3.5	.6	.9	11.3
2020–21	San Antonio	36	32	29.5	.411	.346	.851	3.0	3.5	.7	1.0	15.4
2021–22	San Antonio	49	48	30.3	.426	.314	.869	3.5	**5.6**	1.0	.9	14.4
2021–22	Boston	26	4	27.4	.409	.306	.853	3.4	3.5	.6	.6	11.0
2022–23	Boston	**82**	70	28.3	.462	.381	.875	3.6	3.9	.7	.9	12.4
2023–24†	Boston	73	73	32.6	.461	.396	.901	4.2	5.2	1.0	1.2	15.2
2024–25	Boston	76	76	33.9	.442	.384	.839	**4.5**	4.8	.9	1.1	16.4
2025–26	Boston	77	**77**	**34.1**	.394	.327	**.902**	4.4	5.4	**1.1**	**1.3**	**16.5**
Career		571	455	29.3	.438	.360	.859	3.8	4.3	.9	1.0	13.4

==== Playoffs ====
Year	Team	GP	GS	MPG	FG%	3P%	FT%	RPG	APG	SPG	BPG	PPG
2018	San Antonio	3	0	6.1	.500	**.500**	—	.0	.3	.3	.7	2.3
2019	San Antonio	7	7	27.2	**.547**	.294	.731	3.0	3.0	.7	.7	15.1
2022	Boston	**23**	3	25.4	.364	.313	.824	3.0	2.7	**.9**	.6	8.5
2023	Boston	20	16	29.7	.505	.455	.912	3.0	2.1	.6	1.0	13.4
2024†	Boston	19	**19**	35.6	.452	.404	**.921**	4.3	**4.1**	**.9**	1.2	16.7
2025	Boston	11	11	**37.7**	.463	.385	.861	**5.1**	3.5	.6	1.1	**18.8**
2026	Boston	7	7	35.9	.321	.273	.846	3.3	3.1	**.9**	**1.4**	11.1
Career		90	63	30.3	.444	.380	.854	3.4	2.9	.8	.9	13.1

=== College ===
Year	Team	GP	GS	MPG	FG%	3P%	FT%	RPG	APG	SPG	BPG	PPG
2012–13	UCCS	24	24	29.6	.426	.342	.808	3.8	2.1	1.5	1.0	16.8
2013–14	UCCS	28	28	30.6	.480	.286	.826	6.3	4.2	1.1	1.5	22.2
2014–15	UCCS	33	**33**	32.2	**.529**	.336	**.838**	**7.4**	**5.2**	**2.2**	**2.1**	**25.8**
2016–17	Colorado	**34**	32	**32.8**	.507	**.396**	.813	4.1	4.4	1.2	1.4	18.1
Career		119	117	31.5	.494	.350	.824	5.4	4.1	1.5	1.5	20.9
