= Arnold L. Mitchem =

American educator and executive

Arnold Mitchem

Arnold L. Mitchem is an American educator and executive who was the president and founder of the non-profit Council for Opportunity in Education in Washington, DC. He currently serves as President Emeritus for the organization.

Mitchem is an advocate for equal access to post-secondary education and success of students in the United States—which he views as an extension of the Civil Rights Movement. He is responsible for creating minority leadership for college access issues.

Mitchem formulated the concept of “first-generation” students. This term best described students he sought to assist. It also moved access issues beyond racial boundaries to show that access to education was a more widespread problem in the United States. The concept of "First Generation" students was adopted in the re-authorization of the Higher Education Act of 1980.

== Education ==
Mitchem received a B.A. in History and Education from the University of Southern Colorado (now Colorado State University Pueblo). He has a Ph.D. in the History and Philosophy of Education from Marquette University.

== Awards ==
Mitchem has received honorary doctoral degrees from:

- University of Illinois,
- Saint Joseph's University
- DePaul University
- Marquette University
- CUNY-Lehman College
- Saint Louis University
- University of Massachusetts-Boston
- Lewis University
- Marycrest College

He is the only American to receive an honorary degree from the University of Liverpool.

Other awards include:

- Alumnus of the Year Award from Marquette University,
- Academic Advancement Program Leadership Award from UCLA,
- Outstanding Contribution to Higher Education Award from the National Association of Student Personnel Administrators.
- A fellowship named after him at DePaul University.

== Board positions ==
Mitchem has served on the Board and Executive Committees of many universities and organizations such as the Board of Trustees of Marquette University, the Advisory Panel of the Louisiana Board of Regents, Advisory Board of the Jack Kent Cooke Foundation's Community College Transfer Initiative, and the executive committee of the European Access Network.

Mitchem has testified before the US Congress on Education Regulations, non-profit institutions, and the Higher Education Act

== Career ==
Before coming to COE, Mitchem served as the director of the Educational Opportunity Program at Marquette University.

Mitchem has served on the Board of Trustees of Marquette University, the Advisory Panel of the Louisiana Board of Regents, Advisory Board of the Jack Kent Cooke Foundation's Community College Transfer Initiative, and the executive committee of the European Access Network.

Mitchem is a leading advocate for the federally funded TRIO programs which help low-income and first-generation learners, students with disabilities, adult learners, and veterans overcome financial, social, and cultural barriers to education.
