= Vincent Massari =

American politician

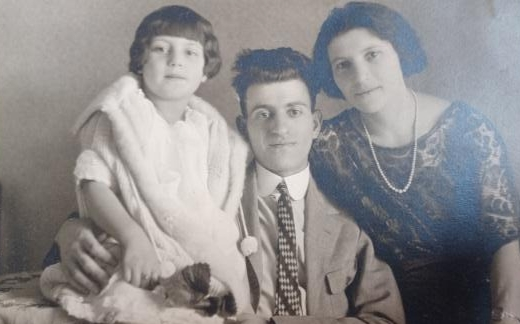
- Vincent Massari and his family in 1921

Member of the Colorado Senate from the 25th district
- In office January 9, 1973 – November 16, 1976

Member of the Colorado Senate from the 19th district
- In office January 8, 1969 – January 9, 1973

Member of the Colorado Senate from the 17th district
- In office January 12, 1965 – January 8, 1969

Member of the Colorado House of Representatives from the Pueblo County district
- In office January 11, 1955 – January 12, 1965

Personal details
- Born: November 29, 1898 Luco dei Marsi, Italy
- Died: November 16, 1976 (aged 77) Pueblo, Colorado
- Party: Democratic Party
- Spouse: Amalia Perasso
- Children: Angelina, Rose
- Profession: Newspaper editor and politician

Vincent Massari (November 29, 1898 – November 16, 1976) was a member of the Colorado General Assembly for 22 years, from 1955 to 1976, the year of his death. He served five two-year terms in the Colorado House of Representatives, from 1955 to 1965, representing Pueblo County. He was elected three times to the Colorado Senate, in 1964, 1968 and 1972. For 42 years he served as president of the Columbian Federation of Italian-American Societies founded on Columbus Day October 12, 1893, in Chicago, Illinois. His legislative efforts led to the establishment of Southern Colorado State College in 1961, known today as Colorado State University Pueblo.

== Biography ==
Vincent Massari, originally named Vincenzo Massari, was born in Luco dei Marsi (AQ), Abruzzo, on November 29, 1898. He emigrated from Italy in 1915, after studying at a Catholic seminary in the town of Penne (now part of the province of Pescara), just a few days before the devastating 1915 Avezzano earthquake, which resulted in thousands of casualties. Upon arriving in the United States of America to Ellis Island, he settled in Las Animas County, Colorado, before finally moving to Pueblo with his parents. As a staunch anti-fascist, he worked in journalism and served in trade unions as a teenager, collaborating with newspapers primarily read by Italian Americans. He wrote for and managed editorial offices such as L'Unione (approximately from 1925 to 1945), founded by Hector Chiariglione, one of the fathers of Columbus Day, and Marsica Nuova, a newspaper that Massari founded in 1918. Through its pages, he published news from Abruzzo and came into contact with important figures of Italian anti-fascism such as Carlo Tresca. He has covered topics such as the history of Fucino Lake and the years after its drainage, as well as the reconstruction of Marsica following the Avezzano earthquake. He also promoted the works of Ignazio Silone, publishing the novel Fontamara in installments on L'Unione.

In 1937, he was elected president of the Columbian Federation of Italian-American Societies and became a member of the Chamber of Commerce of Pueblo. In 1954 he ran for the Colorado House of Representatives and served in the house for 10 years until he moved to the state senate in 1965.

In 1960 he received the Star of Italian Solidarity from the President of the Republic Giovanni Gronchi, in recognition for having cemented the good relations between Italy and the United States.

He was elected to the Colorado Senate three times, serving from 1965 to 1976 as a member of the Democratic Party. Thanks to his political dedication, the Colorado State University Pueblo was established as an official institution in 1975.

== Death ==
Massari died on November 16, 1976, age 77, in the Colorado State Hospital. The Massari Arena, in Pueblo, is dedicated to his memory.

== Personal life ==
Vincent Massari was married to Amalia Perasso on August 21, 1917. They had two daughters: Angelina and Rose. One of his great-granddaughters is Judy A. Massare, famous paleontologist specializing in Jurassic marine reptile research.

== Bibliography ==
- De Stefano, Alessio (2023). Vincent Massari: Cronache di un abruzzese d'America (in Italian). Capistrello: Radici Edizioni. ISBN 9791281235052.
- Dodds, Joanne West (2005). Vincent Massari 1897-1976: The Italian Lion. Pueblo: LaFamiglia Italiano. ISBN 9780977421510.
