= College of Veterinary Medicine (University of Illinois Urbana-Champaign) =

Veterinary medicine college in Urbana, Illinois, US

Coordinates: 40°5′34.7″N 88°13′15.4″W

The College of Veterinary Medicine is a graduate school at the University of Illinois Urbana-Champaign. It is located in Urbana, Illinois.
