= Colorado State University Pueblo =

Public university in Pueblo, Colorado, US

Coordinates: 38°18′27″N 104°34′42″W

- Former names: Southern Colorado Junior College (1933–1937); Pueblo Junior College (1937–1961); Southern Colorado State College (1961–1975); University of Southern Colorado (1975–2003)
- Type: Public Hispanic-Serving Institution
- Established: 1933
- Parent institution: Colorado State University System
- Academic affiliations: Space-grant
- Chancellor: Tony Frank
- President: Rhonda Epper
- Faculty: 372
- Students: 3,730 (fall 2024)
- Undergraduates: 3,228 (fall 2024)
- Postgraduates: 502 (fall 2024)
- Location: Pueblo, Colorado, United States
- Campus: Urban, 279 acres (112.9 ha)
- Newspaper: The Today
- Colors: Blue and red
- Nickname: ThunderWolves
- Sporting affiliations: NCAA Division II – RMAC
- Mascots: Wolfie (costume); Tundra (living mascot)
- Website: csupueblo.edu
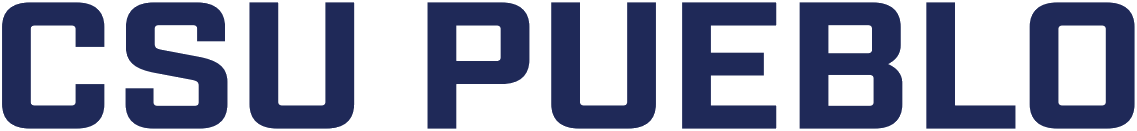

Colorado State University Pueblo (CSU Pueblo) is a regional comprehensive public university in Pueblo, Colorado, United States. It is part of the Colorado State University System and a Hispanic-Serving Institution (HSI).

== History ==
=== 1933 to 1959 ===
The idea for starting a college in Pueblo was initially proposed in 1926, when a bill was put before the state senate to begin a four-year school in the city. The bill was defeated by one vote.

In the years following the Great Depression, the idea for a college in Pueblo was revived through the efforts of a local teacher at Centennial High School, Eric T. Kelly.

At the time, Pueblo's primary employer, steelmaker Colorado Fuel & Iron Corp., was no longer hiring, drought and dust storms were plaguing all of Southern Colorado, and the city still was trying to recover from the devastating floods of 1921.

Kelly organized a committee that was composed of several local business leaders to discuss the possibility of getting a college started, among them Frank Hoag Jr., publisher of The Pueblo Chieftain and Star-Journal newspapers; C.N. Caldwell; and J. Arthur Phelps.

The school originally was to be named San Isabel Junior College, but by the time the school had received incorporation it was changed to Southern Colorado Junior College (SCJC). The name change was made in an effort to broaden the recruitment area for the college.

The first classes at SCJC were held in the fall of 1933 in three vacant rooms on the third-floor of the Pueblo County Courthouse. Sixty-three students (31 full-time and 32 part-time) enrolled and the staff consisted of two full-time and eight part-time instructors, a registrar and Kelly, who agreed to serve as the dean of students, of that first class of students, 17 would earn a degree with the first graduating class of 1935.

By 1935, the school's enrollment was steadily increasing, and the need to find a permanent location was imminent. With land donated by the CF&I and local money from the City Federation of Women's Club and the Works Progress Administration, construction of the college's first building—a 55,000-square-foot (5,100 m^{2}) arts building—began in 1936. The property donated for the college was bordered by the Bessemer ditch, Marilyn Place, Orman Avenue and the alley at Orman and Arthur and became known as the Orman campus.

Kelly gave up his position as dean in 1936, and L.R. Wren took over as president and served in that position until 1939. A year later, Pueblo County residents formed the Pueblo County Junior College District, which allowed for the college to receive tax dollars.

=== Name changes ===
The university has operated under five different names:

==== 1933: Southern Colorado Junior College (SCJC) ====
Southern Colorado Junior College provided two years of college instruction in the arts, literature, and science, adult education and vocational opportunities, and coursework to complete a high school program.

==== 1937: Pueblo Junior College (PJC) ====
Taking advantage of the Junior College Act of the General Assembly, the Pueblo County Junior College District was formed, making the college part of the public school system supported by county-wide taxes. The name change to Pueblo Junior College brought a change in mission. The institution offered the first two years of general study at the college level, providing the educational foundation for students seeking to transfer to complete their higher education degrees at four-year colleges and universities, and continued to offer a range of practical courses for those not seeking a higher education degree.

==== 1961: Southern Colorado State College (SCSC) ====
The 30th anniversary year saw the state enact legislation making the institution a four-year degree granting college and a member of the state system of higher education. The first juniors were enrolled in 1963, followed in 1964 by the first seniors and the first bachelor's degrees awarded in 1965. The name change to Southern Colorado State College reflected recognition of the need for more advanced degrees and an increase in the number of students pursuing a four-year degree in the southeastern region of Colorado. In 1964, Colorado State Senator Vincent Massari led the college's push to become a four-year university. Massari was instrumental in obtaining funds for a new campus in the Belmont area of Pueblo, moving from the old junior college campus on Orman Avenue.

==== 1975: University of Southern Colorado (USC) ====
As the demand for higher education programs increased, the number of academic degrees offered at the undergraduate and graduate levels increased. The first graduate program to be offered was the Master of Arts in Teaching with an emphasis in industrial education beginning in 1972. The institution was granted university status and renamed the University of Southern Colorado. In 1978, the Colorado Commission on Higher Education designated USC as a polytechnic institution. In 1985, USC was integrated into the newly created Colorado State University System (CSU System) with Colorado State University, Colorado's land-grant university, and Fort Lewis College. In 2002, Fort Lewis College chose to be a separate entity. Today, the CSU System comprises CSU, CSU Pueblo and CSU Global.

==== 2003: Colorado State University Pueblo (CSU Pueblo) ====
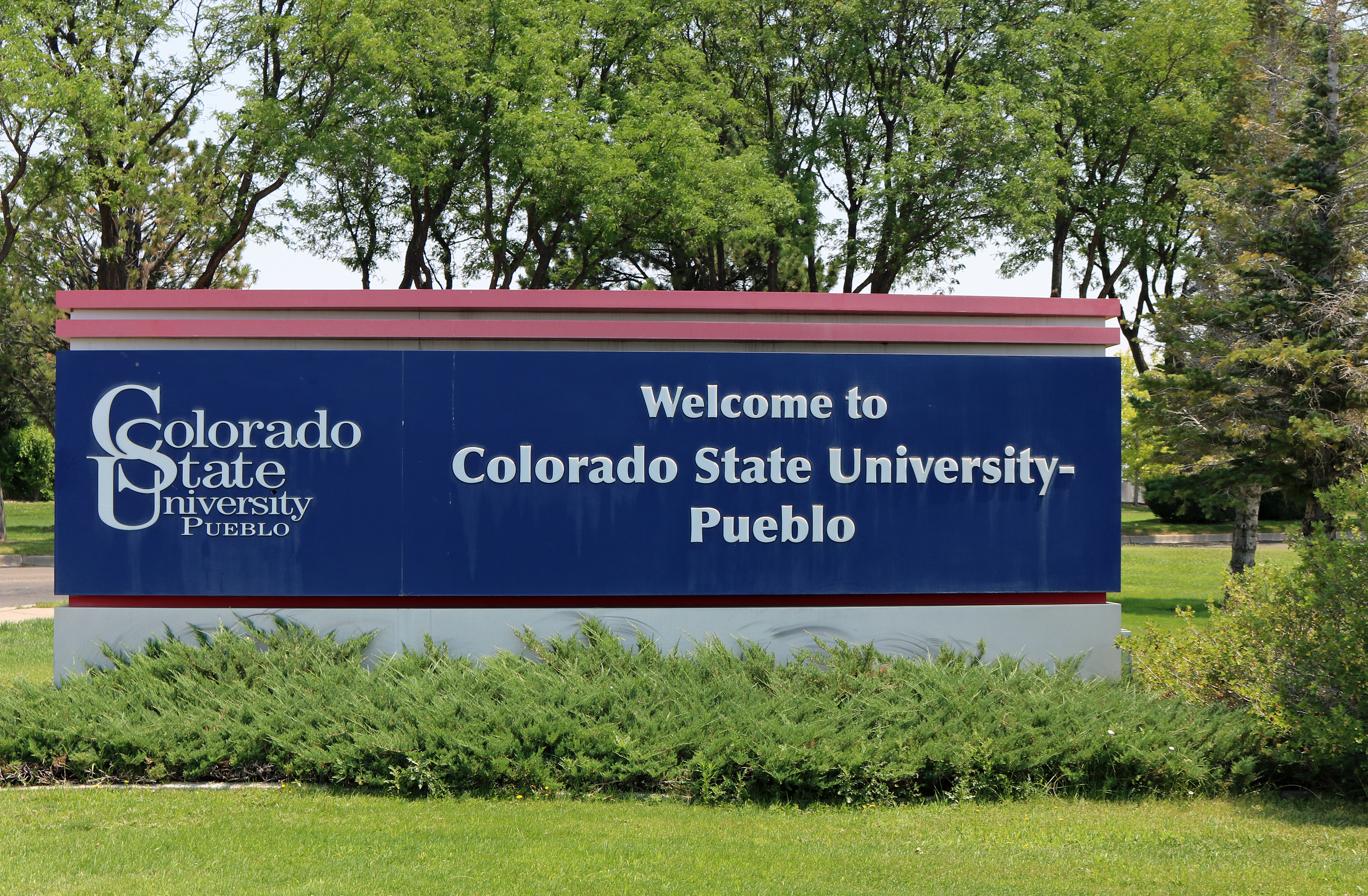
The university's welcome sign

With its long history of collaboration with Colorado State University (CSU) and being a Colorado State University System (CSU System) member since 1985, eventually a name change was forthcoming. Also, an independent study of higher education in Colorado recommended to change the university's name to reflect the unique relationship with CSU. In May 2002, Governor Bill Owens signed legislation changing the institution's mission and name to Colorado State University Pueblo effective July 1, 2003. Today, CSU Pueblo is a regional comprehensive university.

=== Federal designation and awards ===
In 2002, CSU Pueblo was designated a Hispanic-Serving Institution by the United States Department of Education. In 2008, CSU Pueblo was awarded the Outstanding HACU-Member Institution Award by the Hispanic Association of Colleges and Universities. In 2015, the university won the Hispanic Association of Colleges and Universities (HACU) and Solution Generation Leadership in Climate Change Award.

=== Birth of the ThunderWolves ===
Prior to the 1995–96 academic school year, the University of Southern Colorado (now Colorado State University Pueblo) adopted the "ThunderWolf" as its mascot. The ThunderWolf came to life as USC looked to modernize its image following more than 60 years as the "Indians."

The original ThunderWolf logo was put into place prior to the 1995–96 school year. Designed to elicit fear and reverence, the original logo contained a detailed head of a ThunderWolf with a mountain range in the background. After a few years of use, the logo was eventually scrapped for a more easily reproduced logo that contained the letters "USC".

The logo remained in use until the University of Southern Colorado changed its name prior to the 2003–04 school year to Colorado State University Pueblo.

== Campus ==
CSU Pueblo is located north of CO-47 in Pueblo, Colorado, a city of approximately 112,000 residents located in the Pikes Peak region of southern Colorado. The university's 275-acre (1.11 km^{2}) main campus is located in the Belmont area of northern Pueblo. The original 850-acre land was donated to build the campus. In 1985, the university determined that the current campus and anticipated growth could be accommodated on 275 acres. Over time the university has sold the excess property. To the northwest of campus sits the Walking Stick Golf Course.

The campus architecture style was called "Modern Aztec" by the designers in 1963. The unique architecture of the buildings earned a national award by the American Institute of Architects. Most campus buildings reflect the International Style of the 1960s. Today, there are 18 buildings, numerous baseball and softball fields, a soccer/lacrosse complex and the ThunderBowl. These include an administration building, student center, library, child care center and student recreation center which is adjacent to the university's primary athletic complex, Massari Arena.

The campus began a major renovation in 2007, as renovations were made to Massari Arena and construction began on the new student recreation center, which was completed in time for the start of the 2008–2009 academic year. In 2011, a multimillion-dollar renovation project was completed on the university's Library and Academic Resources Center (LARC) and a 1.2 megawatt solar array, as well as construction of three new residence halls (Culebra, Crestone, and Greenhorn). The LARC was LEED Platinum certified by the U.S. Green Building Council, the council's highest certification.

The newly renovated Occhiato Student Center opened in January 2018. Future plans include expanding the soccer facility to provide for more services and to allow the addition of a lacrosse program. Construction on the General Classroom Building began in the summer of 2014, located just west of the Chemistry Building.

=== ThunderBowl ===
The ThunderBowl, previously known the Neta and Eddie DeRose ThunderBowl, is an eight thousand person capacity artificial turf stadium on the CSU Pueblo campus, east of the Rawlings Sports Complex. It was built in 2008 using donations made by the Pueblo community and CSU Pueblo alumni and is primarily used by the ThunderWolves football team.

== Organization ==
=== Administration ===
A board of governors presides over the Colorado State University System (CSU System), which comprises Colorado State University, Colorado State University Pueblo, and Colorado State University Global. The board consists of nine voting members appointed by the governor of Colorado and confirmed by the Colorado State Senate and four elected non-voting members. Voting members are community leaders from many fields, including agriculture, business, and public service. A student and faculty representative from each university act as non-voting board members. The board also appoints a chancellor to oversee both university presidents.

=== Presidents ===
- Eric T. Kelly – 1933–36 (SCJC)
- Leo R. Wren – 1936–39 (PJC)
- Charles E. Haines – 1939–42 (PJC)
- LuLu Cuthbertson – May 1942 – Aug. 1942 (PJC), first female president of the college
- William A. Black – 1942–45 (PJC)
- Marvin C. Knudson – 1945–64 (PJC, PC, SCSC)
- J. Victor Hopper – 1964–71 (SCSC)
- Budge Threlkeld – 1971 (SCSC)
- Harry P. Bowes – 1971–77 (SCSC, USC)
- Gerald Caduff – May 1977 – Oct. 1977 (USC)
- Richard Pesqueria – 1977–79 (USC)
- Alan Love – July 1979 – Aug. 1980 (USC)
- Lyle Wilcox – 1980–84 (USC)
- Robert Shirley – 1984–95 (USC)
- Leslie Wong – 1996–97 (USC)
- Tito Guerrero – 1997–2001 (USC)
- Robert Glennen – 2001–02 (USC)
- Ron Applbaum – 2002–06 (USC, CSU Pueblo)
- Joseph A. Garcia – 2006–10 (CSU Pueblo)
- Tony Frank – 2010 (interim)
- Julio Leon – 2010–11 (Interim)
- Lesley Di Mare – 2011 (CSU Pueblo), first female president of the university
- Timothy Mottet – 2017–2024
- Armando Valdez – 2024–2025
- Rico Munn (interim) 2025-2026
- Rhonda Epper - 2026-Present

== Academics ==
Undergraduate demographics as of Fall 2023
Race and ethnicity	Total
White	42%
Hispanic	36%
Two or more races	9%
Black	6%
Asian	2%
International student	2%
Unknown	2%
American Indian/Alaska Native	1%
Economic diversity
Low-income (Note: The percentage of students who received an income-based federal Pell grant intended for low-income students.)	44%
Affluent (Note: The percentage of students who are a part of the American middle class at the bare minimum.)	56%

Students can choose from 31 undergraduate and 9 graduate programs.

Colorado State University Pueblo's academic colleges are:

- College of Education
- College of Humanities, Arts and Social Sciences
- College of Science, Technology, Engineering and Mathematics
- Hasan School of Business
- School of Health Sciences and Human Movement
- School of Nursing

== Athletics ==
CSU Pueblo is a member of the Rocky Mountain Athletic Conference (RMAC), the oldest conference operating in NCAA Division II and the fourth oldest athletic conference in the United States (founded in 1909). The athletics department supports 16 intercollegiate athletics programs.

In 2007, the Board of Governors of the Colorado State University System approved to bring back football, wrestling, and women's indoor and outdoor track & field. All three programs returned during the 2008–09 school year, and the football program, playing in the ThunderBowl, finished in the top 10 in the nation in attendance, averaging more than 8,000 fans per game during the 2008 season.

In 2008–09, CSU Pueblo athletics programs won two Rocky Mountain Athletic Conference championships—in women's basketball (its third RMAC title in four seasons) and baseball (its first since 2004). The seven-year-old CSU Pueblo football team has won the title of Rocky Mountain Athletic Conference champions in the 2011–2014 seasons.

In 2014, the football team won the NCAA Division II Championship, beating Minnesota State University, Mankato, 13–0.

=== Clubs and activities ===
CSU Pueblo features a cheerleading squad and dance team, club baseball, racquetball, climbing, rugby, and men's soccer. Since its establishment in 1996, the CSU Pueblo racquetball team has won 17 NCAA Division I championships (nine straight from 2004 to 2012).

== Notable alumni ==
- Michael Arnzen, English professor and author
- Beau Brieske, professional baseball player
- Dax Charles, college wrestler and coach
- Dan DeRose, businessman
- Rick L. Edgeman, statistician, professor and quality professional
- Morgan Fox, professional football player
- Frank Grant (SCSC), professional football player
- Herman Heard, professional football player
- Ryan Jensen, professional football player
- Patricia Marcantonio, fiction writer
- Tisha Mauro, politician
- Arnold L. Mitchem, educator and executive
- Mike Pennel, professional football player
- Dana Perino, White House Press Secretary (2007–09) and TV personality
- Jim Ryan, college football coach

== In popular culture ==
CSU Pueblo has a peripheral role in the urban legend of Van Halen's requirement in their technical rider that a bowl of M&M's, with all brown pieces removed, be present in their dressing room. Notably, media reports in the 1980s often claimed that the band had done more than $85,000 of damage to CSU Pueblo's Massari Arena after discovering brown M&M's backstage. In his autobiography, Van Halen's then-lead singer David Lee Roth says that the demand was added as a test of each venue's attention to detail after technical errors at smaller venues led to dangerous and even life-threatening situations. In Roth's telling of the CSU Pueblo incident, he admitted to having done about $12,000 of backstage damage after noticing brown M&M's, but indicated that over $80,000 of damage was done to the newly installed basketball floor because it could not support the band's extremely heavy staging.

== See also ==
- List of colleges and universities in Colorado
