= UCCS Mountain Lions =

Intercollegiate sports teams of the University of Colorado Colorado Springs

- University: University of Colorado Colorado Springs
- NCAA: Division II
- Conference: RMAC
- Athletic director: Nathan Gibson
- Location: Colorado Springs, Colorado
- Varsity teams: 12 (5 men's, 7 women's)
- Basketball arena: Gallogly Events Center
- Baseball stadium: Mountain Lion Field
- Soccer stadium: Mountain Lion Stadium
- Nickname: Mountain Lions
- Colors: Black and gold
- Mascot: Clyde
- Website: gomountainlions.com
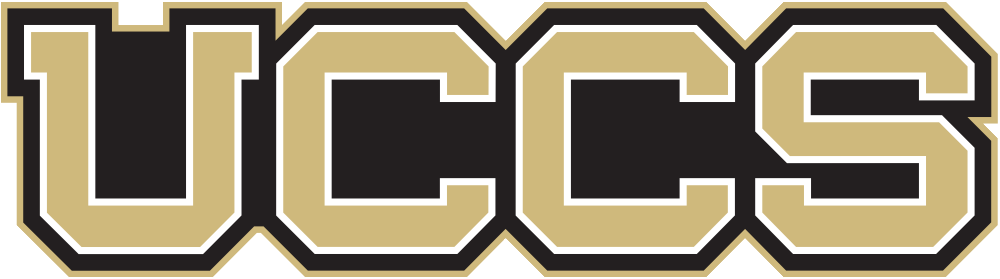

The UCCS Mountain Lions is the official name of the athletic teams that represent the University of Colorado Colorado Springs, located in Colorado Springs, Colorado, in NCAA Division II intercollegiate sports. The Mountain Lions compete as members of the Rocky Mountain Athletic Conference for all 16 varsity sports. The school mascot is the mountain lion, Clyde, with official colors of gold and black, the same de facto school colors of University of Colorado Boulder.

== Facilities ==
Varsity basketball and volleyball are currently played in the Lions Den gymnasium at the University Center, which seats 400 and is the smallest venue in all Division II schools, the size of many smaller high school gymnasiums. With the recent success of Men’s Basketball, achieving the best record in UCCS history, among other things, led to an acceleration of plans to replace the facility with mounting pressure from students and athletes alike. A temporary fix that was completed in early 2007 cost $40,000 and only slightly expanded and upgraded seating. Attempts at separating seating sections did not significantly help in alleviating overcrowding where students are often turned away at popular events. There also exists major problems with the lack of locker room space for use by the athletic teams during competitions. $2 million of CU Presidential Initiative funds were directed towards the construction of a new athletic field house.

After projected costs for the field house more than doubled, the university decided that a permanent events center would be a better use of funds amid plans for a major sports arena to be built in less than 10 years. The events center, to be completed by January 2010, will seat about 1,200 to 1,400 sporting event fans and have the ability to hold more conferences, camps, and convocation events. The new events center will not, however, have an indoor track, weight room, as well as other athletic amenities promised with the field house.

An agreement between the university and the Colorado Springs Christian School nearby lead to the construction of a professional quality soccer and football field at the recently built 4-diamonds sports complex that also consists of three softball fields which are sometimes contracted for use by high school and little league teams. The varsity soccer and softball teams practice and compete at these facilities as well as club and intramural sports.

The varsity cross country, track and field, and golf teams find practice and competition spaces mostly off-campus often at nearby colleges, high schools, or other facilities and locations if required.

A brand new Student Recreation Center was completed in August and September 2007 which houses the Recreation Department overseeing club and intramural sports. The Recreation Center consists of a pool and hot tub, gymnasium, indoor jogging track, bouldering wall, aerobics room, and a cardiovascular and weight lifting floor as well as a small smoothie shop. The Recreation Center was certified as a LEED-Gold building in early 2009 by the U.S. Green Building Council. This was the first LEED-certified building in the campus' history and the first LEED-Gold public building in Southern Colorado. It is believed to be the second recreation center in the U.S. to receive LEED-Gold designation.

== Varsity sports ==
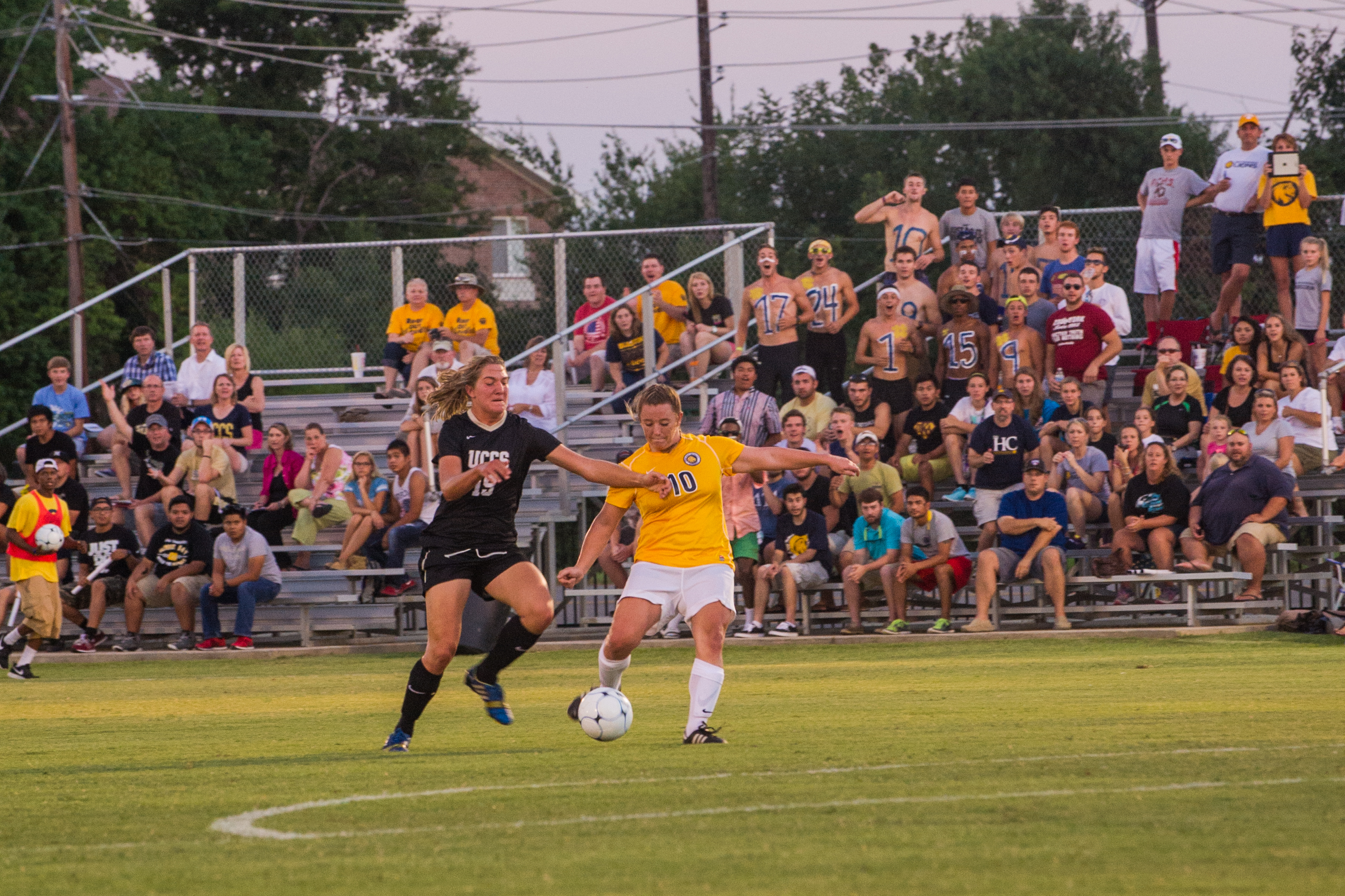
The Mountain Lions women's soccer team in action against the Texas A&M–Commerce Lions in 2014

=== Teams ===
Men's sports

- Baseball
- Basketball
- Cross Country
- Soccer
- Track & Field

Women's sports

- Basketball
- Cross Country
- Lacrosse
- Soccer
- Softball
- Track & Field
- Volleyball

=== Cross country ===
- In 2014, the men's Cross Country team qualified and finished in 23rd place at the NCAA Div. II National Cross Country Championships in Louisville, Kentucky. The team was led by fifth-year senior Luke Dakin. The women's team also qualified and finished 20th. Heather Bates finished 16th as an All-American to lead the women's team. It is the fourth-highest finish for a Mountain Lion at the national championships in program history.
- In 2013, the women's Cross Country team again qualified for the NCAA Div. II National Cross Country Championship in Spokane, Washington and placed 20th. This was the first time the women's program qualified two years in a row.
- In 2012, the men's Cross Country team qualified and finished 11th place at the NCAA Div. II National Cross Country Championships in Joplin, Missouri. The women's team also qualified and finished 10th. This was the first time both teams qualified in the same year.
- In 2011, the men's Cross Country team qualified for the NCAA National Championships in Spokane, Washington and finished 19th overall, led by senior Michael Johnson.
- In 2008, the men's Cross Country team qualified for the NCAA National Championships and finished 17th in the nation, led by seniors Gabe Small, Dan Pinter, Carlos Ruibal and Alex Tiernan. Shannon Payne individually qualified for the NCAA National Championships and finished 3rd overall as an All-American.
- In 2006, the women's cross country team placed 7th at the NCAA Div. II National Cross Country Championship, with Shannon Payne finishing 10th, Jenna Dorsey-Spitz 25th, and Ashley Birger 33rd.
- In 2005, Shannon Payne finished 10th at the NCAA Div. II National Cross Country Championships.

=== Track and field ===
- In 2007, Shannon Payne placed 7th in the women's 3,000 meters and 10th in the 5,000 meters at the outdoor NCAA Div. II National Track and Field Championship.
- In 2005, Moses Tum won the 1,500-meter race at the outdoor NCAA Div. II National Track and Field Championship becoming the program's first national champion, also placing 7th in the 800 meters.
- At the outdoor 2005 NCAA Div. II National Track and Field Championship, Sarah Shepard placed 7th, Ashley Birger 10th, and Tina Gray 11th in the women's 3,000-meter steeplechase, with Shannon Payne placing 8th in the women's 10,000 meters.
- In 2005, Craig Galaydick took 12th place in the Discus Throw at the outdoor NCAA Div II National Track and Field Championship, becoming the first field athlete in UCCS history to place in a National Championship.
- In 2004, Tina Gray placed 6th in the 3,000m steeplechase at the outdoor NCAA Div. II National Track and Field Championship.
- In 2001, Sarah Gray became the third University of Colorado at Colorado Springs runner to earn a top-10 finish at nationals. Gray finished fourth in the women's 3,000 steeplechase at the NCAA Division II Outdoor National Track and Field Championships to join UCCS teammates Trent Briney and Maddi Bosen in ranking among the nation's top 10. Briney placed second in the men's 10,000 and was the top American finisher. Bosen took 10th in the women's 10,000.

=== Volleyball ===
The women's volleyball team made it to the 2007 NCAA tournament.

=== Basketball ===
All American Derrick White (born July 2, 1994), played three years at the Colorado-Colorado Springs Mountain Lions (Division II) as a member of the Men's Basketball program before transferring to the University of Colorado - Buffaloes (Division I) where he finished his collegiate career. Following the 2017 NCAA tournament, White would be chosen as one of the 60 prospects to attend the 2017 NBA combine, and one of only three who did not sign with Division I programs out of high school. White was drafted as the 29th pick overall in the 2017 NBA draft to the San Antonio Spurs.

=== Golf ===
Men's and Women's Varsity Golf programs were eliminated after the 2022-23 academic year.

== Non-NCAA sports ==
=== Club sports ===
UCCS has a large number of club sports including a dance team, a cheerleading club, cycling, baseball, billiards, fencing, hockey, karate, kendo, kung fu, lacrosse, paintball, racquetball, rugby, tai chi, tennis, ultimate frisbee, volleyball, women's soccer and an active intramural program. The intramural sports include flag football, ultimate frisbee, outdoor soccer, table tennis, root beer pong, volleyball, basketball, billiards, and a 3-point shooting contest. Snowboarding, skiing, rock climbing, bouldering, hiking, mountain biking, trail running, lesser common slack roping, and 4-wheeling are popular student activities at UCCS due to the proximity to Pikes Peak, Garden of the Gods, and the surrounding mountainous terrain.
