= CSU Pueblo ThunderWolves =

Intercollegiate athletic teams of Colorado State University Pueblo

- University: Colorado State University Pueblo
- Conference: RMAC
- NCAA: Division II
- Athletic director: Paul Plinske
- Location: Pueblo, Colorado
- Varsity teams: 19 (8 men's, 10 women's)
- Football stadium: Neta and Eddie DeRose ThunderBowl
- Basketball arena: Massari Arena
- Baseball stadium: Rawlings Field
- Mascot: Tundra The T-Wolf
- Nickname: ThunderWolves
- Colors: Red and blue
- Website: gothunderwolves.com

The CSU Pueblo ThunderWolves are the athletic teams at Colorado State University Pueblo. The ThunderWolves are a member of the Rocky Mountain Athletic Conference. They were previously known as the Southern Colorado Indians and then the Southern Colorado ThunderWolves. The program includes eight men's sports: baseball, basketball, cross country, football, golf, soccer, track and field, and wrestling. The women's program has ten sports: basketball, cross country, golf, soccer, softball, swimming and diving, tennis, track and field, and volleyball. Dropped following the 1984 season, football returned in 2008 and the team posted a 4–6 record. The ThunderWolves won the 2014 NCAA Division II Football National Championship, its first in football program history, by blanking previously undefeated Minnesota State University, Mankato 13–0.

== Conference affiliations ==
- 1938–39 to 1962–63: Colorado Junior College Conference / Empire Junior College Conference
- 1963–64 to 1967–68 NAIA independent
- 1968–69 to 1971–72: Rocky Mountain Athletic Conference—Plains Division
- 1972–73 to 1975–76: Great Plains Athletic Conference
- 1976–77 to 1989–90: Rocky Mountain Athletic Conference
- 1990–91 to 1995–96: Colorado Athletic Conference
- 1996–97 to present: Rocky Mountain Athletic Conference

== History ==
=== 1980s ===
In 1984, the school ended its football and baseball programs due to budget cuts.

=== 1990s ===
In 1994, Dan DeRose, the athletic director, re-established the school's baseball program and had a new stadium complex built for baseball.

=== 2000s ===
CSU Pueblo saw the return of football in 2008 with the construction and completion of its new football stadium, the Neta and Eddie DeRose ThunderBowl.

=== 2010s to present ===
CSU Pueblo announced further restoration of athletic programs under new president Lesley Di Mare.

== Mascot ==
The ThunderWolves mascot is Wolfie.
