= Massari Arena =

Multi-purpose arena in Pueblo, Colorado

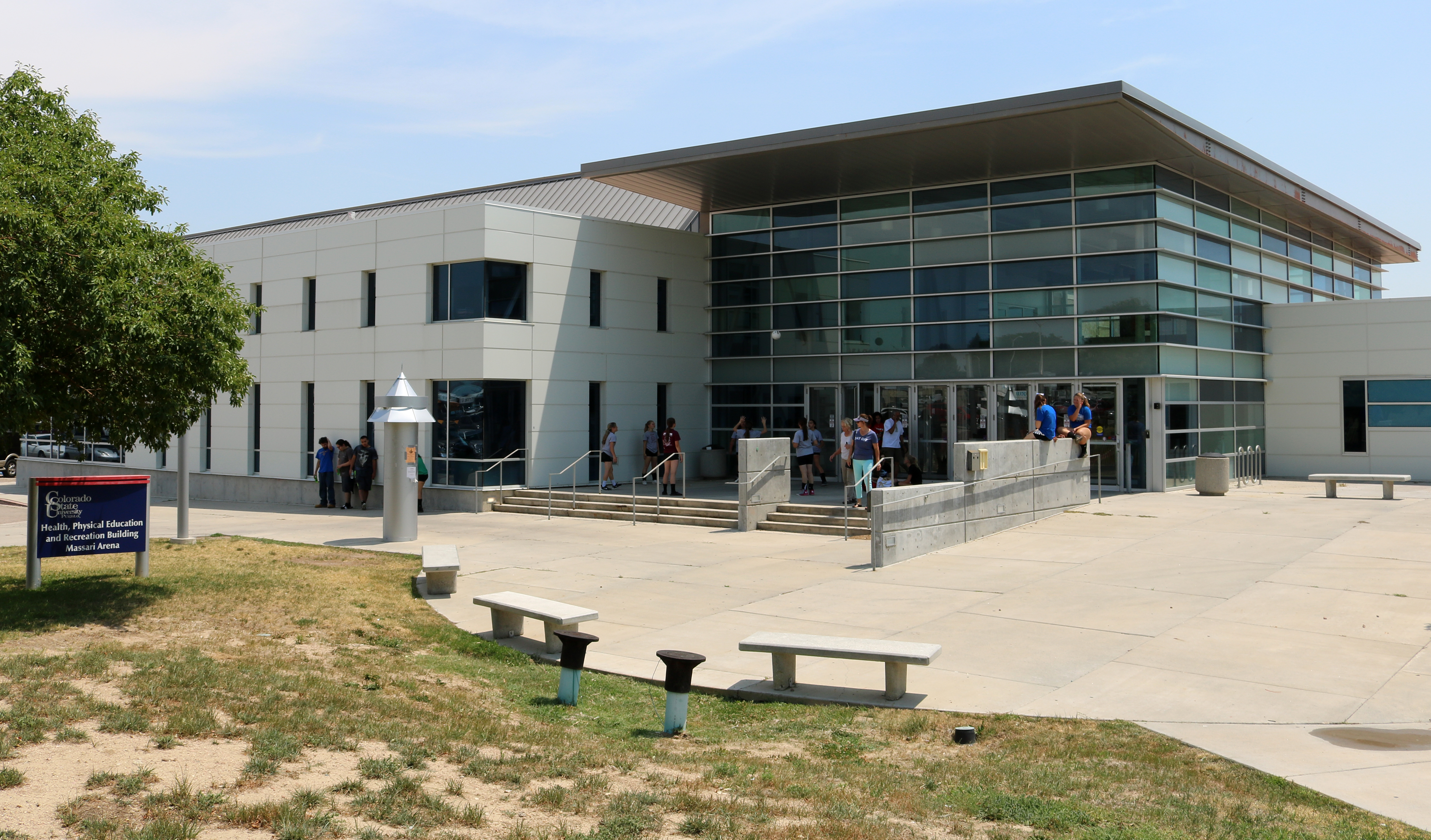
- The arena's main entrance.
- Interactive map of Massari Arena
- Location: 2200 Bonforte Blvd. Pueblo, CO
- Coordinates: 38.309517°N 104.575499°W
- Owner: Colorado State University Pueblo

Construction
- Opened: 1971
- Renovated: 2006–08

Massari Arena is a 3,900 seat multi-purpose arena in Pueblo, Colorado. It was built in 1971, and underwent a reconstruction starting in 2006 and ending in 2008. The arena is the home of the CSU Pueblo ThunderWolves men's and women's basketball, wrestling, and volleyball programs.

The arena is named for Colorado State Senator Vincent Massari who led the college's push to become a four-year university. Senator Massari was instrumental in obtaining funds for a new campus in the Belmont area of Pueblo, moving from the old junior college campus on Orman Avenue.

The arena was the site of a 1980 Van Halen concert that provided the backdrop for an enduring urban legend surrounding the band. The band's technical rider stated that concert organizers had to supply a bowl of M&M's backstage, with all brown pieces removed. In the wake of the concert, media reports indicated that the band caused $85,000 of damage to the arena after noticing brown M&M's. In his autobiography, lead singer David Lee Roth told a different story—he admitted to doing $12,000 in damage backstage, but indicated that over $80,000 of damage had been done to the arena's newly installed basketball floor because it could not support the band's extremely heavy staging.
