= 2007 in basketball =

The following are the basketball events of the year 2007 throughout the world.

Tournaments include international (FIBA), professional (club) and amateur and collegiate levels.

== Events ==
- February 21: The International Basketball Federation lifts the suspension of the Philippines as it recognizes the new basketball federation.
- July 20: The NBA acknowledges that the U.S. FBI is investigating whether referee Tim Donaghy bet on NBA games, including those he officiated.

== Tournaments ==
=== Men's tournaments ===
==== Olympic qualifiers ====
Boldfaced entries qualify for the Olympics; italicized entries will participate in a wild-card competition.

- FIBA Africa Championship 2007 at Angola
  1. **Angola**
  2. Cameroon
  3. Cape Verde
- FIBA Americas Championship 2007 at Las Vegas, United States
  1. **United States**
  2. **Argentina**
  3. Puerto Rico
- FIBA Asia Championship 2007 at Tokushima, Japan
  1. **Iran**
  2. Lebanon
  3. South Korea
- EuroBasket 2007 at Spain
  1. **Russia**
  2. **Spain**
  3. **Lithuania**
- FIBA Oceania Championship 2007 at Australia
  1. **Australia**
  2. New Zealand

==== Other tournaments ====
- All-Africa Games at Algeria
  1. Angola
  2. Egypt
  3. Nigeria
- Pan American Games at Rio de Janeiro, Brazil
  1. Brazil
  2. Puerto Rico
  3. Uruguay
- Southeast Asian Games at Nakhon Ratchasima, Thailand
  1. Philippines
  2. Indonesia
  3. Malaysia
- Southeast Asia Basketball Association Championship 2007 at Ratchaburi, Thailand
  1. Philippines
  2. Indonesia
  3. Malaysia
  - Philippines and Indonesia advanced to the FIBA Asia Championship.

=== Women's tournaments ===
==== Olympic qualifiers ====
- FIBA Africa Championship for Women 2007 at Senegal
  1. **Mali**
  2. Senegal
  3. Angola
- FIBA Americas Championship for Women 2007 at Valdivia, Chile
  1. **United States**
  2. Cuba
  3. Brazil
- FIBA Asia Championship for Women 2007 at Incheon, South Korea
  1. **South Korea**
  2. **China**
  3. Japan
- EuroBasket Women 2007 at Italy
  1. **Russia**
  2. Spain
  3. Belarus
  - Russia qualifies for the 2008 Olympics.
- FIBA Oceania Championship for Women 2007 at Dunedin, New Zealand
  1. **Australia**
  2. **New Zealand**
  3. Fiji

==== Other tournaments ====
- Pan American Games at Rio de Janeiro, Brazil
  1. United States
  2. Brazil
  3. Cuba
- Southeast Asian Games at Nakhon Ratchasima, Thailand
  1. Thailand
  2. Malaysia
  3. Philippines
- Southeast Asia Basketball Association Championship for Women 2007 at Phuket, Thailand
  1. Thailand
  2. Philippines
  3. Malaysia

=== Youth tournaments ===
- FIBA Under-19 World Championship at Novi Sad, Serbia:
  1. Serbia
  2. United States
  3. France
- FIBA Under-19 World Championship for Women at Bratislava, Slovakia
  1. United States
  2. Sweden
  3. Serbia
- FIBA Under-21 World Championship for Women at Moscow Oblast, Russia
  1. United States
  2. Australia
  3. France

== Club championships ==
=== Transnational seasons ===
Region	League / Tournament	Champion	Runner-up	Result	Playoff format
Euroleague Basketball	2006–07 Euroleague	(Greece) Panathinaikos	(Russia) CSKA Moscow	93–91	One-game playoff
Euroleague Basketball	2006–07 ULEB Cup	(Spain) Real Madrid	(Lithuania) Lietuvos Rytas	87–75	One-game playoff
FIBA Asia	2007 FIBA Asia Champions Cup	(Iran) Saba Battery Tehran	(Syria) Al Jalaa	83–75	One-game playoff
South America	2007 LSB season	(Argentina) Libertad de Sunchales	(Brazil) Unimed / Franca	3–1	Best-of-5 series

=== National championships ===
Men:

- (United States) (Canada) NBA
  - Season:
    - Western Conference and League: Dallas Mavericks (67-15)
    - Eastern Conference: Detroit Pistons (53-29)
    - Other Division champions: Phoenix Suns, Utah Jazz, Toronto Raptors and Miami Heat.
  - Finals: The San Antonio Spurs defeat the Cleveland Cavaliers 4-0 in the best-of-seven finals. Finals MVP: Tony Parker
- (Australia) National Basketball League, 2006-07 season: Brisbane Bullets defeat the Melbourne Tigers 3-1 in the best-of-five Grand Final.
- (China) Chinese Basketball Association, 2006-07 season: Bayi Rockets defeated the Guangdong Southern Tigers 4-1 in the best-of-seven finals.
- (Croatia) Croatian League: Cibona defeat Zadar 3-2 in the best-of-five finals.
- (Estonia) Estonian League, 2006–07: TÜ/Rock defeat Kalev/Cramo 4–2 in the best-of-7 final.
- (France) French League: Roanne defeat Nancy 81-74 in the one-off final.
- (Germany) German Bundesliga: Brose Baskets defeat Artland Dragons 3-1 in the best-of-five finals.
- (Greece) Greek League: Panathinaikos defeat Olympiacos 3-2 in the best-of-five finals.
- (Iran) Iranian Super League, 2006-07 season: Saba Battery defeat Petrochimi 2–0 in the best-of-three final.
- Israel Premier League: Maccabi Tel Aviv defeat Hapoel Jerusalem 80-78 in the one-off final.
- (Italy) Italian Serie A: Montepaschi Siena sweep VidiVici Bologna 3-0 in the best-of-five finals.
- (Lithuania) Lithuanian LKL: Žalgiris defeat Lietuvos Rytas 4-2 in the best-of-seven finals.
- Montenegro League: Budućnost Podgorica sweep Lovćen 3-0 in the best-of-five finals.
- (Philippines) Philippine Basketball Association, 2006-07 season:
  - Philippine Cup: Barangay Ginebra Kings defeat the San Miguel Beermen 4-2 in the best-of-seven finals. Finals MVP: Jayjay Helterbrand
  - Fiesta Conference: Alaska Aces defeat the Talk 'N Text Phone Pals 4-3 in the best-of-seven finals. Finals MVP: Willie Miller
- (Poland) Polish League: Prokom Trefl Sopot defeat Turów Zgorzelec 4-1 in the best-of-seven finals.
- (Russia) Russian Super League: CSKA Moscow sweep UNICS Kazan 3-0 in the best-of-five finals.
- Serbia Super League: Partizan defeat Red Star 3-1 in the best-of-five finals.
- (Slovenia) Slovenian League: Helios Domžale defeat Union Olimpija 3-2 in the best-of-five finals.
- (Spain) Spanish ACB:
  - Season: TAU Cerámica topped the league standings.
  - Playoffs: Real Madrid defeat Winterthur FCB 3-1 in the best-of-five Finals.
- (Turkey) Turkish Basketball League: Fenerbahçe Ülker sweep Efes Pilsen 4-0 in the best-ot-seven finals.
- (United Kingdom) British Basketball League, 2006-07:
  - Season: Guildford Heat win the regular-season crown.
  - Playoffs: Newcastle Eagles defeat the Scottish Rocks 95-82 to win the postseason playoffs.
- (Bosnia and Herzegovina) (Croatia) (Montenegro) (Serbia) (Slovenia) Adriatic League: Partizan defeat FMP 2-0 in the best-of-three finals.

Women:

- (United States) 2007 WNBA Finals: The Phoenix Mercury defeated the Detroit Shock, 3-2. Finals MVP: Cappie Pondexter
- EuroLeague Women 2006-07: (Russia) Spartak Moscow Region defeated (Spain) Ros Casares Valencia, 76-62 in the final.

=== College ===
Men:

- (United States) NCAA
  - Division I: Florida 84, Ohio State 75
    - Most Outstanding Player: Corey Brewer, Florida
  - National Invitation Tournament: West Virginia 78, Clemson 73
  - Division II: Barton 77, Winona State 75
  - Division III: Amherst 80, Virginia Wesleyan 67
- (United States) NAIA
  - NAIA Division I: Oklahoma City 79, Concordia (CA) 71
  - NAIA Division II: MidAmerica Nazarene (Kan.) 78, Mayville State (N.D.) 60
- (United States) NJCAA
  - Division I: Midland CC TX 94, Chipola JC 75
  - Division II: Mott Community College (Flint, MI) 75, Monroe Community College (Rochester, NY) 61
  - Division III: Sullivan County 74, Northland CTC 68
- (Philippines) UAAP Men's: La Salle beat UE 2-0 in the best-of-3 finals
- NCAA (Philippines) Seniors': San Beda beat Letran, 2-0 in the best-of-3 finals

Women:

- (United States) NCAA
  - Division I: Tennessee 59, Rutgers 46
    - Most Outstanding Player: Candace Parker, Tennessee
  - WNIT: Wyoming 72, Wisconsin 56
  - Division II: Southern Connecticut 61, Florida Gulf Coast 45
  - Division III DePauw 55, Washington University in St. Louis 52
- (United States) NAIA
  - NAIA Division I: Lambuth (Tenn.) 63, Cumberla nd (Tenn.) 50
  - NAIA Division II: Indiana Wesleyan 48, College of the Ozarks 34
- (United States) NJCAA
  - Division I: Odessa College TX 73, Central Arizona College 50
  - Division II: Kirkwood Community College 84, Kankakee Community College 55
  - Division III: Anoka-Ramsey CCMinn. 52, Mohawk Valley CC NY 44
- (Philippines) UAAP Women's: Ateneo beat UP, 2-0 in the best-of-3 series

=== Prep ===
- (United States) USA Today Boys Basketball Ranking #1: Lincoln High School, Dallas, Texas
- (United States) USA Today Girls Basketball Ranking #1: Collins Hill High School, Suwanee, Georgia
- NCAA (Philippines) Juniors: San Sebastian beat Letran, 2-0 in the best-of-3 series
- (Philippines) UAAP Juniors: Zobel beat Ateneo, 2-0 in the best-of-3 series

== Awards and honors ==
=== Naismith Memorial Basketball Hall of Fame ===
- Class of 2007:
  - Van Chancellor
  - Pedro Ferrandiz
  - Phil Jackson
  - Mirko Novosel
  - Marvin Rudolph
  - Texas Western
  - Roy Williams

=== Women's Basketball Hall of Fame ===
- Class of 2007
  - Daedra Charles-Furlow
  - Bridgette Gordon
  - Mel Greenberg
  - Pamela Kelly-Flowers
  - Andy Landers
  - Andrea Lloyd-Curry

=== FIBA Hall of Fame ===
- Class of 2007
  - Players

- Alexander Belov
- Amaury Pasos
- Ann Meyers
- Bill Russell
- Dražen Dalipagić
- Dražen Petrović
- Emiliano Rodríguez

- Fernando Martín
- Hortência Marcari
- Ivo Daneu
- Krešimir Ćosić
- Liliana Ronchetti
- Mirza Delibašić
- Nikos Galis

- Oscar Furlong
- Pierluigi Marzorati
- Radivoj Korać
- Sergei Belov
- Teófilo Cruz
- Uljana Semjonova
- Vanya Voynova

- Coaches

- Aleksandar Nikolić
- Alexander Gomelsky
- Antonio Díaz-Miguel
- Dean Smith
- Giancarlo Primo
- Henry "Hank" Iba
- Lidia Alexeyeva
- Ranko Žeravica
- Togo Renan Soares "Kanela"
- Vladimir Kondrashin

- Referees

- Allen Rae
- Ervin Kassai
- Mario Hopenhaym
- Obrad Belošević
- Pietro Reverberi
- Renato Righetto
- Vladimir Kostin

- Contributors

- Borislav Stankovic

=== Professional ===
- Men
  - NBA Most Valuable Player Award: Dirk Nowitzki, Dallas Mavericks
  - NBA Rookie of the Year Award: Brandon Roy, Portland Trail Blazers
  - NBA Defensive Player of the Year Award: Marcus Camby, Denver Nuggets
  - NBA Sixth Man of the Year Award: Leandro Barbosa, Phoenix Suns
  - NBA Most Improved Player Award: Monta Ellis, Golden State Warriors
  - NBA Coach of the Year Award: Sam Mitchell, Toronto Raptors
  - FIBA Europe Player of the Year Award: Andrei Kirilenko, Utah Jazz and Russia
  - Euroscar Award: Tony Parker, San Antonio Spurs and France
  - Mr. Europa: Dimitris Diamantidis, Panathinaikos and Greece
- Women
  - WNBA Most Valuable Player Award: Lauren Jackson, Seattle Storm
  - WNBA Defensive Player of the Year Award: Lauren Jackson, Seattle Storm
  - WNBA Rookie of the Year Award: Armintie Price, Chicago Sky
  - WNBA Sixth Woman of the Year Award: Plenette Pierson, Detroit Shock
  - WNBA Most Improved Player Award: Janel McCarville, New York Liberty
  - Kim Perrot Sportsmanship Award: Tully Bevilaqua, Indiana Fever
  - WNBA Coach of the Year Award: Dan Hughes, San Antonio Silver Stars
  - WNBA All-Star Game MVP: Cheryl Ford, Detroit Shock
  - WNBA Finals Most Valuable Player Award: Cappie Pondexter, Phoenix Mercury
  - FIBA Europe Player of the Year Award: Anete Jēkabsone-Žogota, (Russia) Dynamo Moscow and Latvia

=== Collegiate ===
- Combined
  - Legends of Coaching Award: Gene Keady, Purdue
- Men
  - John R. Wooden Award: Kevin Durant, Texas
  - Naismith College Coach of the Year: Tony Bennett, Washington State
  - Frances Pomeroy Naismith Award: Tre Kelley, South Carolina
  - Associated Press College Basketball Player of the Year: Kevin Durant, Texas
  - NCAA basketball tournament Most Outstanding Player: Mario Chalmers, Kansas
  - USBWA National Freshman of the Year: Kevin Durant, Texas
  - Associated Press College Basketball Coach of the Year: Tony Bennett, Washington State
  - Naismith Outstanding Contribution to Basketball: Bob Knight
- Women
  - John R. Wooden Award: Candace Parker, Tennessee
  - Naismith College Player of the Year: Lindsey Harding, Duke
  - Naismith College Coach of the Year: Gail Goestenkors, Duke
  - Wade Trophy: Candace Parker, Tennessee
  - Frances Pomeroy Naismith Award: Lindsey Harding, Duke
  - Associated Press Women's College Basketball Player of the Year: Candace Parker, Tennessee
  - NCAA basketball tournament Most Outstanding Player: Candace Parker, Tennessee
  - Basketball Academic All-America Team: Chrissy Givens, Middle Tennessee
  - Carol Eckman Award: Theresa Grentz, Illinois
  - Maggie Dixon Award: Krista Kilburn-Steveskey, Hofstra
  - USBWA National Freshman of the Year: Tina Charles, Connecticut
  - Associated Press College Basketball Coach of the Year: Gail Goestenkors, Duke
  - List of Senior CLASS Award women's basketball winners: Alison Bales, Duke
  - Nancy Lieberman Award: Lindsey Harding, Duke
  - Naismith Outstanding Contribution to Basketball: Kay Yow

== Deaths ==
- January 9 — Zeke Zawoluk, American college All-American (St. John's) and NBA player (Indianapolis Olympians, Philadelphia Warriors) (born 1930)
- February 7 — Ray Corley, American NBA player (born 1928)
- February 8 — Shelby Metcalf, American college coach (Texas A&M) (born 1930)
- February 21 — Barry Stevens, American NBA player (born 1963)
- February 22 — Dennis Johnson, American Hall of Fame NBA player (Seattle SuperSonics, Phoenix Suns, Boston Celtics) (born 1954)
- March 1 — Bobby Speight, All-American at NC State (born 1930)
- March 20 — Frank Baird, American NBL player (Indianapolis Kautskys) (born 1912)
- April 13 — Steve Malovic, American NBA player (born 1956)
- April 18 — Harry Miller, Toronto Huskies player (born 1923)
- May 27 — Howard Porter, former NBA player and 1971 NCAA Tournament Most Outstanding Player (born 1948)
- June 10 — Jim Killingsworth, American college coach (Idaho State, Oklahoma State, TCU) (born 1923)
- June 11 — Ray Mears, American college coach (Tennessee) (born 1926)
- July 26 — Skip Prosser, College coach of the Wake Forest Demon Deacons (born 1950)
- August 17 — Eddie Griffin, former Seton Hall and NBA player (born 1982)
- August 22 — Butch van Breda Kolff, former college and NBA coach (born 1922)
- September 14 — Dave Humerickhouse, All-American college player (Bradley) (born 1924)
- September 17 — Charlotte Lewis, American Olympic women's basketball player (born 1955)
- November 28 — Bob Simpson, Canadian Olympic player (1952) (born 1930)
- November 29 — Ralph Beard, All-American at Kentucky. Two-time National Champion and Olympic Gold Medalist (born 1927)
- December 13 — Jack Thornton, American NBL player (Hammond Ciesar All-Americans, Sheboygan Red Skins) (born 1914)
- December 28 — Aidin Nikkhah Bahrami, Iran national basketball team player (born 1982)

== See also ==
- Timeline of women's basketball
