= 2007 NCAA Division II women's basketball tournament =

- Teams: 64
- Finals site: Health and Sports Center, Kearney, Nebraska
- Champions: Southern Connecticut Fighting Owls (1st title)
- Runner-up: Florida Gulf Coast Eagles (1st title game)
- Semifinalists: Clayton State Lakers (1st Final Four); UC San Diego Tritons (1st Final Four)
- Winning coach: Joe Frager (1st title)
- MOP: Kate Lynch (Southern Connecticut)

The 2007 NCAA Division II women's basketball tournament was the 26th annual tournament hosted by the NCAA to determine the national champion of Division II women's collegiate basketball in the United States.

Southern Connecticut defeated Florida Gulf Coast in the championship game, 61–45, to claim the Owls' first NCAA Division II national title.

The championship rounds were contested at the Health and Sports Center on the campus of the University of Nebraska at Kearney in Kearney, Nebraska.

== Regionals ==
=== East - Glenville, West Virginia ===
Location: Jesse Lilly Gym Host: Glenville State University

First round Round of 64; March 9
1	Glenville State	81
8	St. Andrews	44
4	Anderson (SC)	61
5	California (PA)	57
3	Indiana (PA)	71
6	Barton	65
7	Pittsburgh-Johnstown	71
2	Pfeiffer	58

Regional semifinals Round of 32; March 10
1	Glenville State	78
4	Anderson (SC)	64
3	Indiana (PA)	75
7	Pittsburgh-Johnstown	59

Regional finals Sweet Sixteen; March 12
1	Glenville State	65
3	Indiana (PA)	59

=== South - Fort Myers, Florida ===
Location: Alico Arena Host: Florida Gulf Coast University

First round Round of 64; March 9
1	Florida Gulf Coast	78
8	Benedict	49
4	Valdosta State	64
5	Tampa	57
3	Arkansas Tech	65
6	Rollins	62
2	Delta State	67
7	Florida Tech	50

Regional semifinals Round of 32; March 10
1	Florida Gulf Coast	50
4	Valdosta State	41
3	Arkansas Tech	40
2	Delta State	43

Regional finals Sweet Sixteen; March 12
1	Florida Gulf Coast	57
2	Delta State	44

* – Denotes overtime period

=== North Central - Grand Forks, North Dakota ===
Location: Betty Engelstad Sioux Center Host: University of North Dakota

First round Round of 64; March 9
1	North Dakota	98
8	Minnesota State-Moorhead	66
4	Regis	67
5	Metro State	66
6	Concordia St. Paul	82
3	South Dakota	74
7	Nebraska-Kearney	75
2	Augustana (SD)	68

Regional semifinals Round of 32; March 10
1	North Dakota	78
4	Regis	63
6	Concordia-St. Paul	89
7	Nebraska-Kearney	92*

Regional finals Sweet Sixteen; March 12
1	North Dakota	108
7	Nebraska-Kearney	75

* – Denotes overtime period

=== Northeast - New Haven, Connecticut ===
Location: James W. Moore Fieldhouse Host: Southern Connecticut State University

First round Round of 64; March 9
1	Southern Connecticut	68
8	New Haven	45
5	Holy Family	78
4	St. Rose	65
3	Pace	77
6	American International	59
2	Bentley	58
7	Stonehill	55

Regional semifinals Round of 32; March 10
1	Southern Connecticut	68
5	Holy Family	51
3	Pace	61
2	Bentley	69

Regional finals Sweet Sixteen; March 12
1	Southern Connecticut	59
2	Bentley	49

=== South Atlantic - Morrow, Georgia ===
Location: Athletics Center Host: Clayton State University

First round Round of 64; March 9
1	Clayton State	60
8	Carson-Newman	36
5	Columbus State	59
4	Elizabeth City State	57
6	Georgia College	87
3	Wingate	67
2	North Carolina Central	73
7	Newberry	66

Regional semifinals Round of 32; March 10
1	Clayton State	63
5	Columbus State	60
6	Georgia College	72
2	North Carolina Central	63

Regional finals Sweet Sixteen; March 12
1	Clayton State	66*
6	Georgia College	65

* – Denotes overtime period

=== Great Lakes - Romeoville, Illinois ===
Location: Neil Corey Arena Host: Lewis University

First round Round of 64; March 9
1	Lewis	82
8	Bellarmine	62
4	Drury	76
5	SIU Edwardsville	61
6	Gannon	66
3	Grand Valley State	59
7	Ferris State	70
2	Northern Kentucky	69

Regional semifinals Round of 32; March 10
1	Lewis	62
4	Drury	67
6	Gannon	61
7	Ferris State	80

Regional finals Sweet Sixteen; March 12
4	Drury	79
7	Ferris State	69

=== South Central - St. Joseph, Missouri ===
Location: MWSU Fieldhouse Host: Missouri Western State University

First round Round of 64; March 9
1	Missouri Western	80
8	Montana State Billings	59
4	Texas A&M Commerce	81
5	Emporia State	77
3	Washburn	74
6	Angelo State	54
2	West Texas A&M	87
7	Northwest Missouri State	72

Regional semifinals Round of 32; March 10
1	Missouri Western	72
4	Texas A&M Commerce	73
3	Washburn	54
2	West Texas A&M	39

Regional finals Sweet Sixteen; March 12
4	Texas A&M Commerce	71
3	Washburn	70

=== West - La Jolla, California ===
Location: RIMAC Arena Host: University of California, San Diego

First round Round of 64; March 9
1	UC-San Diego	78
8	Western Washington	45
4	Alaska Anchorage	49
5	Cal State Dominguez Hills	48
3	Seattle Pacific	69
6	Sonoma State	60
2	Chico State	63
7	Cal State San Bernardino	50

Regional semifinals Round of 32; March 10
1	UC-San Diego	66
4	Alaska Anchorage	51
3	Seattle Pacific	60
2	Chico State	75

Regional finals Sweet Sixteen; March 12
1	UC-San Diego	80
2	Chico State	63

== Elite Eight - Kearney, Nebraska ==
Location: Health and Sports Center Host: University of Nebraska at Kearney

National quarterfinals Elite Eight; March 21
Clayton State	60
Texas A&M–Commerce	55
Florida Gulf Coast	83
North Dakota	64
UC San Diego	71
Glenville State	61
Southern Connecticut	74
Drury	54

National semifinals Final Four; March 22
Clayton State	57
Florida Gulf Coast	61
UC San Diego	53
Southern Connecticut	67

National championship March 24
Florida Gulf Coast	45
Southern Connecticut	61

== All-tournament team ==
- Kate Lynch, Southern Connecticut
- LaShauna Jones, Southern Connecticut
- Shamika Jackson, Southern Connecticut
- Katie Schrader, Florida Gulf Coast
- Steffi Sorensen, Florida Gulf Coast

== See also ==
- 2007 NCAA Division I women's basketball tournament
- 2007 NCAA Division III women's basketball tournament
- 2007 NAIA Division I women's basketball tournament
- 2007 NAIA Division II women's basketball tournament
- 2007 NCAA Division II men's basketball tournament
