= Barton Bulldogs =

- University: Barton College
- Nickname: Bulldogs
- NCAA: Division II
- Conference: Conference Carolinas (primary); South Atlantic (football)
- Athletic director: Chip Hester
- Location: Wilson, North Carolina
- Varsity teams: 26 (13 men's, 13 women's)
- Football stadium: Electric Supply Company Field at Truist Stadium
- Basketball arena: Wilson Gymnasium
- Baseball stadium: Nixon Field
- Softball stadium: Jeffries Field
- Soccer stadium: Soccer Field
- Aquatics center: Kric Swimming Pool
- Lacrosse stadium: Electric Supply Company Field at Truist Stadium
- Tennis venue: Tennis Complex
- Colors: Royal blue and white
- Mascot: Blue the Bulldog
- Website: bartonbulldogs.com

Team NCAA championships
- 1

The Barton Bulldogs (formerly known as the Atlantic Christian Bulldogs) are the athletic teams that represent Barton College, located in Wilson, North Carolina, in intercollegiate sports at the Division II level of the National Collegiate Athletic Association (NCAA), primarily competing in the Conference Carolinas since the 1930–31 academic year. The Bulldogs are the only remaining founding member of the conference.

Barton competes in 26 intercollegiate varsity sports. Men's sports include baseball, basketball, cross country, football, golf, lacrosse, soccer, swimming, tennis, track and field (indoor and outdoor), and volleyball; while women's sports include acrobatics and tumbling, basketball, cross country, golf, lacrosse, soccer, softball, swimming, tennis, track and field (indoor and outdoor), and volleyball.

After a very controversial stint as Vice President of Athletics, Ken Tyler was forced to resign and accept a new position at Townsend University. Controversies stemmed largely from long term coaches seeking out other positions, or retirement under his leadership, as well as the manner in which he chose to hire new coaches. It is also of note that there was controversy in the firing of a 1st year swim coach in February 2026, that had controversy of it own. In his absence, the College quickly promoted head football coach Chip Hester as a permanent replacement. Hester will continue to be coach the football team for the teams 2026 campaign, it is not yet known if he will past that.

== Conference affiliations ==
NCAA

- Conference Carolinas (1930–present)

== Varsity teams ==
Men's sports	Women's sports
Baseball	Acrobatics and tumbling
Basketball	Basketball
Cross country	Cross country
Football	Golf
Golf	Lacrosse
Lacrosse	Soccer
Soccer	Softball
Swimming	Swimming
Tennis	Tennis
Track and field^{†}	Track and field^{†}
Triathlon	Triathlon
Volleyball	Volleyball
† – Track and field includes both indoor and outdoor

== Championships ==
=== Team national championships ===
Sport	Association	Division	Year	Opponent/Runner-Up	Score
Men's basketball (1)	NCAA	Division II	2007	Winona State	77–75
Men's tennis (2)	NAIA	Single	1984	Belhaven	29–28
Men's tennis (2)	NAIA	Single	1979	Gustavus Adolphus	28–26

=== 2006–07 Men's Basketball Team ===
On March 24, 2007, the men's basketball team won the NCAA Men's Division II Basketball Championship. The team, with a 31–5 record in 2006–07, defeated the previously undefeated defending champion Winona State Warriors, who held an NCAA Division II-record 57-game winning streak at the time. Winona State looked to repeat as champs, taking a 74–67 lead with 45 seconds remaining. Barton's Anthony Atkinson then scored 10 points in the last 39 seconds, including the winning layup at the buzzer for a 77–75 victory. Atkinson has since become a fan favorite with the Harlem Globetrotters.

== Notable alumni ==
=== Baseball ===
- Bill Brooks
- Billy Godwin

=== Basketball ===
- Chris Flemmings

=== Football ===
- Kameron Johnson
