= 2007 NAIA Division II men's basketball tournament =

- Teams: 32
- Finals site: Keeter Gymnasium, Point Lookout, Missouri
- Champions: MidAmerica Nazarene Pioneers (1st title, 1st title game, 2nd Fab Four)
- Runner-up: Mayville State Comets (1st title game, 1st Fab Four)
- Semifinalists: Northwest Eagles (1st Fab Four); Northwestern Red Raiders (5th Fab Four)
- Charles Stevenson Hustle Award: Eric Kruger (Northwestern (IA))
- Chuck Taylor MVP: Adam Hepker (MidAmerica Nazarene)
- Top scorer: Monty Rogers (Mayville State) (110 points)

The 2007 NAIA Division II Men's Basketball national championship was held in March at Keeter Gymnasium in Point Lookout, Missouri. The 16th annual NAIA basketball tournament featured 32 teams playing in a single-elimination format.

== Awards and honors ==
- Leading scorer: 110 - Monty Rogers (Mayville State)
- Leading rebounder: 52 - Chad Schuiteman (Northwestern Iowa)
- Tournament MVP: Adam Hepker (MidAmerica Nazarene)
- Coach of the Year: Craig Smith (Mayville State)

== Bracket ==
First round March 7–8 | Second round March 9
1 | Bellevue (NE) | 95
-- | Fisher (MA) | 54
1 | Bellevue (NE) | 56
16 | Northwest (WA) | 61
-- | Holy Names (CA) | 74
16 | Northwest (WA) | 86
1st SEED TIER; March 9
9 | Sioux Falls (SD) | 60
-- | Cornerstone (MI) | 74
-- | Cornerstone (MI) | 78
8 | Walsh (OH) | 56
-- | King (TN) | 69
8 | Walsh (OH) | 78
5 | Warner Pacific (OR) | 82
-- | Friends (KS) | 75
5 | Warner Pacific (OR) | 75
12 | Cedarville (OH) | 86
-- | Evangel (MO) | 83
12 | Cedarville (OH) | 97
4th SEED TIER; March 9
13 | Mayville State (ND) | 101
-- | William Penn (IA) | 86
13 | Mayville State (ND) | 88
-- | Florida Memorial | 72
-- | Florida Memorial | 67
4 | Huntington (IN) | 64
3 | Point Park (PA) | 63
-- | Spalding (KY) | 78
-- | Spalding (KY) | 61
-- | College of the Ozarks (MO) | 66
-- | College of the Ozarks (MO) | 91
14 | Saint Francis (IN) | 59
3rd SEED TIER; March 10
11 | Northwestern (IA) | 99
-- | Albertson (ID) | 77
11 | Northwestern (IA) | 74
6 | Kansas Wesleyan | 54
-- | Bluefield (VA) | 77
6 | Kansas Wesleyan | 92
7 | Oregon Tech | 90
-- | Northwood (FL) | 72
7 | Oregon Tech | 82
10 | Indiana Wesleyan | 95
-- | Aquinas (MI) | 54
10 | Indiana Wesleyan | 80
2nd SEED TIER; March 10
15 | Mt. Vernon Nazarene (OH) | 73
-- | Dakota Wesleyan (SD) | 72
15 | Mt. Vernon Nazarene (OH) | 73
2 | MidAmerica Nazarene | 75
-- | Trinity International | 59
2 | MidAmerica Nazarene | 69

Quarterfinals; March 10
16 | Northwest (WA) | 98
-- | Cornerstone (MI) | 69
12 | Cedarville (OH) | 81
13 | Mayville State (ND) | 82
-- | College of the Ozarks (MO) | 57
11 | Northwestern (IA) | 73
10 | Indiana Wesleyan | 68
2 | MidAmerica Nazarene | 77

Semifinals; March 12
16 | Northwest (WA) | 65
13 | Mayville State (ND) | 74
11 | Northwestern (IA) | 71
2 | MidAmerica Nazarene | 81

National championship March 13
13 | Mayville State (ND) | 60
2 | MidAmerica Nazarene | 78

- * denotes overtime.

== See also ==
- 2007 NAIA Division I men's basketball tournament
- 2007 NCAA Division I men's basketball tournament
- 2007 NCAA Division II men's basketball tournament
- 2007 NCAA Division III men's basketball tournament
- 2007 NAIA Division II women's basketball tournament
