= Southern Guilford High School =

American public school in North Carolina

Location
- 5700 Drake Road; Greensboro, North Carolina 27406; United States; 35°56′57″N 79°51′19″W

Information
- Type: Public
- Established: 1970 (56 years ago)
- Oversight: Guilford County Schools
- CEEB code: 341620
- Principal: Rodney Boone
- Staff: 62.33 (FTE)
- Grades: 9–12
- Enrollment: 938 (2022-23)
- Student to teacher ratio: 15.05
- Campus type: Rural
- Colors: Maroon and gold
- Athletics conference: 3-A; Mid Piedmont Conference
- Nickname: Storm
- Website: southernhs.gcsnc.com

Southern Guilford High School was founded in 1970 in the Sumner area of Guilford County, North Carolina, United States. For the 2014–2015 school year, Southern had an enrollment of 1220 in grades 9–12, and 70 teachers. The school's current principal is Rodney Boone.

The school operates on a block, college-styled schedule (with four classes each semester), as opposed to the traditional bell schedule that has six periods year-long.

== Colors and mascot ==
Southern Guilford's colors are maroon and gold. Its mascot is the Storm. In 2004 the Guilford County Board of Education voted to retire the school's former mascot, the Indian.

== Southern Academy ==
In 2005 Southern Guilford was turned into a magnet school for the study of agriscience, education, and medicine. Students are able to explore the fields of pre-medicine, sports medicine, nursing, biotechnology, and agriscience research, botany and horticulture science, veterinary technology and elementary, middle, and upper grades education. Preset course schedules not only reflect state graduation standards, but also incorporate honors and AP courses in the student-selected specialized area of the Advanced Sciences or Education strand. Fifteen credits of the total coursework are academy-designated classes required to graduate Southern Guilford's Academy. The students in the Academy also get priority, in regards to class registration, over the students who actually attend their own district school.

Some students actively switch to Southern in an attempt at a higher class ranking, due to the small size of the original student body population.

Currently, the academy is one of the biggest in the county, and enrolls students from high schools all over the county.

=== Academy strands ===
Southern Guilford has had a focus on agricultural fields since its opening in 1970. The Agriscience program consists of studies in botany, horticulture, biotechnology and animal science. Academy courses include agriscience applications, animal science I and II, horticulture I and II, agriscience advanced studies and horticulture landscape construction. The school has a "barn" facility on campus which allows students a dually immersive and basic introduction to agricultural practice.

Th Education has the smallest number of students out of the three strands. Academy courses include teacher cadet I and II, and advanced placement psychology.

The Medicine strand concentrates on sports medicine, nursing and pre-medicine. Academy courses include health team relations, sports medicine I and II, medical careers I and II, anatomy/physiology, biomedicine and pharmacy tech.

== Notable alumni ==
- Marcus Brandon — member of the North Carolina House of Representatives
- Dino Hackett — former NFL linebacker
- Joey Hackett — former NFL tight end
- Isaac Parks — former college football punter
- Jake Smith — winner of the Johnny Bench Award as the top collegiate catcher in 2006
- Jeff Varner — former Survivor contestant
