= 2007 NAIA Division I men's basketball tournament =

College basketball tournament

- Teams: 32
- Finals site: Municipal Auditorium; Kansas City, Missouri
- Champions: Oklahoma City (5th title)
- Runner-up: Concordia (CA) (3rd title game)
- Semifinalists: Robert Morris (IL) (3rd Final Four); Faulkner (2nd Final Four)
- Coach of the year: Ray Harper (Oklahoma City)
- Player of the year: Jarekus Singleton (William Carey)
- Charles Stevenson Hustle Award: Adam Greenaway (Concordia (CA))
- Chuck Taylor MVP: Kameron Gray (Oklahoma City)
- Attendance: 19,302
- Top scorer: Eddie Smith (Illinois–Springfield) (67 points)

The 2007 Buffalo Funds - NAIA Men's Division I Basketball Tournament was held from March 14 to 20 at Municipal Auditorium in Kansas City, Missouri. This was the 70th annual NAIA basketball tournament and features 32 teams playing in a single-elimination format. This tournament had the most total points scored for both teams in one game in the history of the NAIA tournament. Totaling 243pts when Concordia (CA) got 124pts and beat Robert Morris (IL) who has 119pts. That game went into 4 overtimes. (The longest game was a 5OT game back in 1978 when Grand Canyon beat Central State (OH) 88-82.) Concordia would go on to be the 2007 runner-up to Oklahoma City University. Oklahoma City University would beat Concordia 79 to 71.

== Awards and honors ==
- Leading scorer: Eddie Smith, of Illinois–Springfield scored 33.5 points in just two games.
- Leading rebounder: Zach Allender of Campbellsville in two games Zach had 31 rebounds.
- Most Points, both teams, in tournament history: 243, done by Concordia (CA) (124) vs Robert Morris (IL) (119) (4OT)
- Most consecutive tournament appearances: 16th, Georgetown (KY)
- Most tournament appearances: Georgetown (KY), 26th of 30, appearances to the NAIA Tournament.

== Bracket ==
First round March 14 and 15	Second round March 16
1	Robert Morris (IL)	81
–	Westmont	68
1	Robert Morris (IL)	86
16	Oklahoma Baptist	76
16	Oklahoma Baptist	77
–	Cumberlands	72
TOP TIER; March 14
8	Auburn–Montgomery	61
–	Jarvis Christian	60
8	Auburn–Montgomery	73
9	Crichton	70
9	Crichton	98
–	Tougaloo	73
13	Houston Baptist	80
–	Campbellsville	55
13	Houston Baptist	72
4	Concordia (CA)	83
4	Concordia (CA)	77
–	Lee	61
TOP TIER; March 14
5	Southern Nazarene	72
–	Westminster (UT)	67
5	Southern Nazarene	81
12	Union (TN)	82
–	California Baptist	62
12	Union (TN)	75
3	Georgetown (KY)	79
–	Xavier (La.)	82
–	Xavier (LA)	57
–	NW Oklahoma State	58
–	NW Oklahoma State	61
14	Lewis–Clark State	57
BOTTOM TIER; March 15
11	San Diego Christian	76
–	Faulkner	86
–	Faulkner	87
–	McKendree	79
–	McKendree	86
6	Mountain State	80
7	Park	68
–	Olivet Nazarene	62
7	Park	88
10	Azusa Pacific	91
–	LSU–Shreveport	56
10	Azusa Pacific	61
BOTTOM TIER; March 15
15	Illinois–Springfield	104
–	Lambuth	89
15	Illinois–Springfield	78
2	Oklahoma City	90
–	Wiley	74
2	Oklahoma City	90

Elite Eight; March 17
1	Robert Morris (IL)	116
9	Crichton	96
4	Concordia (CA)	88
12	Union (TN)	68
–	NW Oklahoma State	59
–	Faulkner	76
10	Azusa Pacific	68
2	Oklahoma City	84

NAIA national semifinals March 19
1	Robert Morris (IL)	119 (4 OT)
4	Concordia (CA)	124
–	Faulkner	61
2	Oklahoma City	76

NAIA national championship March 20
4	Concordia (CA)	71
2	Oklahoma City	79

== See also ==
- 2007 NAIA Division I women's basketball tournament
- 2007 NCAA Division I men's basketball tournament
- 2007 NCAA Division II men's basketball tournament
- 2007 NCAA Division III men's basketball tournament
- 2007 NAIA Division II men's basketball tournament
