= Billy Godwin =

College baseball coash in America

Biographical details
- Born: November 19, 1964 (age 61); Rocky Mount, North Carolina, U.S.

Playing career
- 1986: Atlantic Christian College
- Position: Pitcher

Coaching career (HC unless noted)
- 1999–2005: Louisburg College
- 2006–2014: East Carolina
- 2020–2023: UNC Greensboro

Head coaching record
- Overall: 411–308–1 (NCAA); 262–85 (NJCAA)
- Tournaments: NCAA: 10–11; C-USA: 12–16; SoCon: 9–3

Accomplishments and honors

Championships
- Conference USA regular season (2009); SoCon tournament (2022)

Awards
- NJCAA Division I Region X Coach of the Year (2005); North Carolina College Coach of the Year Award (2002); C-USA Coach of the Year (2009)

Billy Godwin (born November 19, 1964) is an American college baseball coach and former pitcher. He is the former head baseball coach at the University of North Carolina at Greensboro. Godwin played college baseball at Atlantic Christian College in 1986. He was the head baseball coach of East Carolina from 2006 to 2014. In 2015, Godwin was listed as an area scout, based in Emerald Isle, North Carolina, for the New York Yankees of Major League Baseball.

== Early years ==
Godwin was born in Rocky Mount, North Carolina, and attended Northern Nash High School. He then earned an athletic scholarship as a pitcher in 1982 to attend Atlantic Christian College, now Barton College. He was named team captain in 1986 and Kiwanis Award for the Most Outstanding Male Student-Athlete. He graduated in 1986 in Business Administration. His first coaching job came at North Carolina Wesleyan College in 1989 and 1990. He was the assistant coach to former UNC head coach Mike Fox. The two guided North Carolina Wesleyan College to the NCAA Division III baseball championship in 1989 and a third-place finish a year later.

== Head coach ==
Godwin's first head coaching stint came at Enfield Academy, a private school in Nash County, North Carolina. Starting in 1991 he was the athletic director and head baseball coach. During the seven seasons (1991–1997) as head coach, he accumulated a 131–57 (.697) record. During this time Enfield Academy baseball team had five consecutive conference championships, four straight Final Four appearances and a state title in 1994.

After Enfield Academy, Godwin became Cary Academy's first athletic director in 1997.

Godwin's next head coaching job came at Louisburg College. During his six-year term, he earned a 262–85 (.755) overall record. During the 2005 season, Godwin guided the Hurricanes to Region X regular season and tournament titles on his way to earning Region X Coach-of-the-Year honors. The 2005 Hurricanes finished the regular season with a 49–13 record and stood sixth nationally in the NJCAA Division I final regular season poll. In 2004, the Hurricanes went 40–18 and claimed the top seed at the Region X Tournament before finishing the campaign as a regional finalist.

After taking the helm at Louisburg College in the fall of 1999, Godwin kept the Hurricanes in the national spotlight by averaging 43 wins per season. The Hurricanes finished with a school-record 51–11 mark in 2002 and made their tenth trip to the College World Series in Grand Junction, Colorado. During his tenure at Louisburg, Godwin earned Region X and Eastern District Coach-of-the-Year honors, received the North Carolina College Coach-of-the-Year award in 2002.

== East Carolina ==
Godwin first came to ECU as an assistant coach on June 9, 2005. After Randy Mazey resigned his position as head coach, Godwin was tapped as interim head coach on October 10, 2005, then was named permanently to the position on October 28, 2005. For his first year as head coach, his record was 33–26.

Godwin's team also earned many awards and recognition during his first year. Senior catcher Jake Smith earned the Johnny Bench Award, which is given annually to the nations top collegiate catcher. Four Pirates earned All-Conference honors. The 2006 Pirates ranked among the league leaders (all games) in average (.305), runs scored (381), total bases (939), slugging percentage (.452), hits (633), triples (13), RBI (342), home runs (58), ERA (4.34), runs allowed (296), opposing batting average (.282) and runners picked off (10). His 2009 team made it to the Super Regionals before losing to the University of North Carolina at Chapel Hill. Godwin earned a master's degree in education in 1995 from East Carolina University.

== UNC Greensboro ==
On August 8, 2019, Godwin was named the head baseball coach at the University of North Carolina at Greensboro.

On December 19, 2023, Godwin announced he was stepping down from his position at UNCG to rejoin the New York Yankees in a scouting role.

== Head coaching records ==
Below is a table of Godwin's yearly records as an NCAA head baseball coach.

Record table
Season	Team	Overall	Conference	Standing	Postseason
East Carolina Pirates (Conference USA) (2006–2014)
2006	East Carolina	33–26	10–14	6th	
2007	East Carolina	40–23	14–9	2nd	NCAA Regional
2008	East Carolina	42–21	13–11	5th	NCAA Regional
2009	East Carolina	46–20	17–7	1st	NCAA Super Regional
2010	East Carolina	32–27	11–13	t-5th	
2011	East Carolina	41–21	14–10	3rd	NCAA Regional
2012	East Carolina	36–24–1	13–10–1	6th	NCAA Regional
2013	East Carolina	31–26	14–10	t-3rd	
2014	East Carolina	33–26	16–14	t-6th	
East Carolina:		314–214–1	122–98–1		
UNC Greensboro Spartans (Southern Conference) (2020–2023)
2020	UNC Greensboro	11–5	0–0		Season canceled due to COVID-19
2021	UNC Greensboro	27–25	12–17	4th (Blue)	
2022	UNC Greensboro	34–30	12–9	T–2nd	NCAA Regional
2023	UNC Greensboro	25–34	9–12	6th	Southern tournament
UNC Greensboro:		97–94	33–38		
Total:		411–308–1			
National champion Postseason invitational champion Conference regular season champion Conference regular season and conference tournament champion Division regular season champion Division regular season and conference tournament champion Conference tournament champion
