= Isaac Parks =

American football player (born 1997)

Profile
- Position: Punter

Personal information
- Born: May 14, 1997 (age 29)
- Listed height: 6 ft 0 in (1.83 m)
- Listed weight: 210 lb (95 kg)

Career information
- High school: Southern Guilford (Greensboro, North Carolina)
- College: North Carolina A&T (2015–2016); UNC Pembroke (2017–2019)

Career history

Playing
- 2025–2026: Ohio Valley Ironmen

Coaching
- 2023: North Carolina A&T Aggies; Special team analyst
- 2025: Montgomery Central (NC); Assistant coach

Awards and highlights
- First-team Little All-American (2019); Second-team Little All-American (2018)

Other information

YouTube information
- Channel: Isaac Punts
- Years active: 2016–present
- Subscribers: 171,000
- Views: 185 million
- Last updated: July 2, 2026

Isaac Sebastian Parks (born May 14, 1997) is an American football punter known for his YouTube channel Isaac Punts. He played college football for the UNC Pembroke Braves, earning first-team All-American honors after leading NCAA Division II in punting average in 2019.

== Early life ==
Parks grew up in Greensboro, North Carolina, one of three children born to Cynthia and Alex Parks. He was originally an offensive lineman at Southern Guilford High School, but after seeing limited playing time and sustaining a concussion, he decided to learn to punt after his freshman year. He was awarded letters twice and was named all-conference in his senior season after helping the team go 13–1 and reach the NCHSAA Class 3A semifinals.

== College career ==
Parks began college as a backup punter for his hometown North Carolina A&T Aggies. After two seasons without seeing the field, he transferred to the NCAA Division II–level UNC Pembroke Braves in 2017. He punted 56 times in his redshirt freshman season and averaged 38.6 yards per attempt, with 17 punts landing inside the 20-yard line and a season long of 62 yards. He later said his freshman performance was below the "standard I set for myself". The following year in 2018, Parks distinguished himself among the best punters in Division II, making 51 punts that averaged 43.8 yards, with 21 of them landing inside the 20. He was named All-American by the American Football Coaches Association, the Associated Press, and D2Football.com. Pembroke went 2–8 in both the 2017 and 2018 seasons.

Parks set multiple career highs in his redshirt junior season in 2019. In week two, he kicked a single-game career-high 366 yards on eight punts (45.75 average) against Virginia State. The following week, a video of him went viral when he proposed to his girlfriend on the field after the win against Catawba. In week six, Parks posted a career-best 52.50 yards per punt on four attempts against Mars Hill. He helped Pembroke improve to 4–7 in the 2019 season and led Division II with 45.7 yards per punt on 52 attempts. He landed 19 punts inside the 20 and kicked two career-long 67-yarders. He earned first-team All-American honors from the Associated Press, the D2CCA, and D2Football.com. In three seasons with the Braves, Parks set program career records in punting yards, punt attempts, and punting average (42.6 yards per punt).

After missing the 2020 season during the COVID-19 pandemic, Parks said that attempted transfers to the Charlotte 49ers and the Division II Lake Erie Storm did not work out due to NCAA eligibility mix-ups.

== YouTube and later career ==
Parks began regularly posting football analyses on his YouTube channel, Isaac Punts, in 2021.

Parks was a special teams analyst for his former school North Carolina A&T in 2023. He became an assistant coach at Montgomery Central High School in Troy, North Carolina, in 2025.

After college, Parks played semi-professional football and documented his efforts to make the professional game on his YouTube channel. In 2025, six years after his last college season, Parks signed with the Ohio Valley Ironmen of the newly established International Football Alliance (IFA). Head coach Manny Matsakis organized an independent schedule after several other teams in the league withdrew before the season. However, the Ironmen outscored their opponents so badly that Parks made only one punt attempt, a touchback, through three games before the rest of the season was cancelled.

== Personal life ==
Parks and his wife, Shania, have two children.
