= 2022 The Citadel Bulldogs baseball team =

American college baseball season

2022 The Citadel Bulldogs baseball
- Conference: Southern Conference
- Record: 26–31 (5–16 SoCon)
- Head coach: Tony Skole (5th season)
- Hitting coach: Zach Lucas (3rd season)
- Pitching coach: Blake Cooper (5th season)
- Home stadium: Joseph P. Riley Jr. Park

2022 Southern Conference baseball standings
	Conf.						Overall
Team	W		L		T	PCT	W		L		T	PCT
Wofford ‍†‍‍	16	–	4	–	1	.786	42	–	16	–	1	.720
Mercer ‍‍‍	12	–	9	–	0	.571	40	–	18	–	0	.690
Samford ‍‍‍	12	–	9	–	0	.571	28	–	29	–	0	.491
UNC Greensboro ‍‍‡‍^{y}	12	–	9	–	0	.571	34	–	28	–	0	.548
East Tennessee State ‍‍‍	11	–	10	–	0	.524	31	–	21	–	0	.596
Western Carolina ‍‍‍	9	–	11	–	1	.452	26	–	31	–	1	.457
VMI ‍‍‍	6	–	15	–	0	.286	16	–	40	–	0	.286
The Citadel ‍‍‍	5	–	16	–	0	.238	26	–	31	–	0	.456
† – Conference champion ‡ – Tournament champion y – Invited to the NCAA tournament Rankings from D1Baseball

2022 The Citadel Bulldogs baseball team represented The Citadel in the 2022 NCAA Division I baseball season. The Bulldogs played their home games at Joseph P. Riley Jr. Park in Charleston, South Carolina. The team were coached by Tony Skole, in his 5th season at The Citadel.

The Citadel recorded an overall record of 26–31, and finished in 8th place with a record of 5–16 in the Southern Conference.

== Previous season ==
The Bulldogs finished 12–39 overall, and 4–25 in the Southern Conference in 2021. They were 8–7 on March 19 before struggling through the remainder of the season.

== Personnel ==
=== Roster ===
2022 The Citadel Bulldogs baseball roster
Pitchers: 4 - Will Bastian - Senior; 13 - George Derek Floyd - Freshman; 15 - Cameron Reeves - Senior; 17 - Fisher Paulsen - Freshman; 18 - Lathan Todd - Senior; 23 - Will Holmes - Freshman; 24 - Gant Starling - Junior; 28 - Landon Beverly - Freshman; 30 - Luke Kissenberth - Sophomore; 31 - Caleb Speedy - Junior; 33 - Devin Beckley - Graduate Student; 36 - Tyler Dunn - Graduate Student; 37 - Simon Graf - Junior; 39 - Chace Cooper - Junior; 42 - Matthew Polk - Freshman; 45 - Conner Cummiskey - Sophomore; 48 - Rohan Shah - Sophomore; 52 - Josh Woody - Freshman; 54 - Jack Benedict - Freshman	Catchers: 9 - Ben Hutchins - Sophomore; 14 - Travis Lott - Junior; 40 - Gray Sobel - Sophomore; Infielders: 1 - Dylan Costa - Graduate Student; 5 - Sawyer Reeves - Sophomore; 6 - Anthony Badala - Junior; 8 - Garrett Dill - Freshman; 10 - Crosby Jones - Junior; 20 - Travis Elliott - Sophomore; 21 - John Lanier - Junior; 22 - Tilo Skole - Graduate Student; 32 - Noah Mitchell - Junior; 44 - Jeffrey Zeigler - Sophomore; 46 - Campbell Brusman - Freshman; 47 - Antonio Colon - Sophomore	Outfielders: 0 - Wells Sykes - Freshman; 2 - Wesley Lane - Senior; 12 - Ryan McCarthy - Graduate Student; 25 - Chase Loggins - Freshman; 34 - Cole Simpson - Senior; 50 - Clay Wilson - Junior; 53 - Max Childress - Freshman; 55 - Grant Dowis - Junior; Utility: 3 - Luke Montenery - Junior; 38 - Wyatt Spurrier - Sophomore

=== Coaches ===
2022 The Citadel Bulldogs baseball coaching staff
- Tony Skole – Head coach – 5th year
- Zach Lucas – Assistant coach (hitting/recruiting) – 3rd year
- Blake Cooper – Assistant coach (pitching) – 5th year

== Schedule ==
Legend
	The Citadel win
	The Citadel loss
	Cancellation
**Bold**	The Citadel team member
*	Non-Conference game

2022 The Citadel Bulldogs baseball game log
Regular season

February
Date	Opponent	Site/stadium	Score	Win	Loss	Save	Attendance	Overall record	SoCon Record
Feb 18	Fairleigh Dickinson*	Joseph P. Riley Jr. Park • Charleston, SC	**W** 8–1	**Reeves (1–0)**	Stewart (0–1)	None	537	1–0	
Feb 19	Fairleigh Dickinson*	Joseph P. Riley Jr. Park • Charleston, SC	**W** 11–7	**Beatson (1–0)**	Medero (0–1)	None	332	2–0	
Feb 20	Fairleigh Dickinson*	Joseph P. Riley Jr. Park • Charleston, SC	**W** 11–6	**Hutchins (1–0)**	Racobaldo (0–1)	None	293	3–0	
Feb 22	at Charleston Southern*	Buccaneer Ballpark • North Charleston, SC	**W** 16–3	**Beckley (1–0)**	Braun (0–1)	None	222	4–0	
Feb 25	Villanova*	Joseph P. Riley Jr. Park • Charleston, SC	**W** 8–7	**Cummiskey (1–0)**	Siegenthaler (0–1)	None	240	5–0	
Feb 26	Villanova*	Joseph P. Riley Jr. Park • Charleston, SC	**L** 1–6	Patten (1–1)	**Paulsen (0–1)**	None	360	5–1	
Feb 27	Villanova*	Joseph P. Riley Jr. Park • Charleston, SC	**W** 13–10	**Beckley (2–0)**	Vanderslice (0–1)	None	219	6–1	

March
Date	Opponent	Site/stadium	Score	Win	Loss	Save	Attendance	Overall record	SoCon Record
Mar 1	Charleston Southern*	Joseph P. Riley Jr. Park • Charleston, SC	**L** 5–9	Robinson (1–0)	**Graf (0–1)**	Padysak (1)	253	6–2	
Mar 4	Northern Kentucky*	Joseph P. Riley Jr. Park • Charleston, SC	**W** 9–5	**Reeves (2–0)**	Klingerbeck (1–2)	None	223	7–2	
Mar 5	Northern Kentucky*	Joseph P. Riley Jr. Park • Charleston, SC	**L** 4–8	Richardson (1–0)	**Beckley (2–1)**	None	403	7–3	
Mar 6	Northern Kentucky*	Joseph P. Riley Jr. Park • Charleston, SC	**W** 9–5	**Hutchins (2–0)**	Echeman (0–2)	None	283	8–3	
Mar 9	USC Upstate*	Joseph P. Riley Jr. Park • Charleston, SC	**L** 2–3	Parson (1–0)	**Beatson (1–1)**	Matheny (1)	148	8–4	
Mar 12	Siena*	Joseph P. Riley Jr. Park • Charleston, SC	**L** 1–9	Seiler (1–2)	**Reeves (2–1)**	Marynczak (1)		8–5	
Mar 12	Siena*	Joseph P. Riley Jr. Park • Charleston, SC	**W** 15–10	**Paulsen**	Rubino (0–2)	**Dunn (1)**	219	9–5	
Mar 13	Siena*	Joseph P. Riley Jr. Park • Charleston, SC	**W** 13–7	**Hutchins (3–0)**	Kahn (0–1)	None	154	10–5	
Mar 16	No. 2 Texas*	Joseph P. Riley Jr. Park • Charleston, SC	**L** 4–18	Sthele (2–0)	**Graf (0–2)**	None	1,316	10–6	
Mar 18	Saint Peter's*	Joseph P. Riley Jr. Park • Charleston, SC	**W** 4–0	**Beckley (3–1)**	Mahady (1–2)	None	271	11–6	
Mar 19	Saint Peter's*	Joseph P. Riley Jr. Park • Charleston, SC	**W** 7–3	**Paulsen (2–1)**	Dubois (1–3)	None	273	12–6	
Mar 20	Saint Peter's*	Joseph P. Riley Jr. Park • Charleston, SC	**W** 18–3	**Hutchins (4–0)**	Markantonatos (1–3)	None	307	13–6	
Mar 22	South Carolina*	Joseph P. Riley Jr. Park • Charleston, SC	**W** 4–3	**Dunn (1–0)**	Braswell (1–1)	None	3,533	14–6	
Mar 25	George Mason*	Joseph P. Riley Jr. Park • Charleston, SC	**W** 6–3	**Graf (1–2)**	Lyons (2–3)	**Dunn (2)**	371	15–6	
Mar 26	George Mason*	Joseph P. Riley Jr. Park • Charleston, SC	**W** 5–4	**Paulsen (3–1)**	Shields (0–1)	**Beckley (1)**	404	16–6	
Mar 27	George Mason*	Joseph P. Riley Jr. Park • Charleston, SC	**L** 4–6	Hosley (3–2)	**Dunn (1–1)**	None	308	16–7	
Mar 29	North Florida*	Joseph P. Riley Jr. Park • Charleston, SC	**W** 8–1	**Beckley (4–1)**	Holden (0–1)	None	231	17–7	

April
Date	Opponent	Site/stadium	Score	Win	Loss	Save	Attendance	Overall record	SoCon Record
Apr 1	at Creighton*	TD Ameritrade Park • Omaha, NE	**L** 2–11	Lamb (2–1)	**Reeves (2–2)**	None	1,249	17–8	
Apr 2	at Creighton*	TD Ameritrade Park • Omaha, NE	**L** 3–5	Bergstrom (2–1)	**Beckley (4–2)**	Steier (4)	1,308	17–9	
Apr 3	at Creighton*	TD Ameritrade Park • Omaha, NE	**L** 3–8	Lamb (3–1)	**Hutchins (4–1)**	None	1,494	17–10	
Apr 8	at Mercer	OrthoGeorgia Park • Macon, GA	**L** 2–8	Harlow (5–1)	**Reeves (2–3)**	None	750	17–11	0–1
Apr 9	at Mercer	OrthoGeorgia Park • Macon, GA	**L** 1–4	Lobus (5–1)	**Paulsen (3–2)**	Kelley (3)	415	17–12	0–2
Apr 10	at Mercer	OrthoGeorgia Park • Macon, GA	**L** 5–11	Farmer (5–0)	**Beatson (1–2)**	Franklin (1)	550	17–13	0–3
Apr 12	College of Charleston*	Joseph P. Riley Jr. Park • Charleston, SC	**W** 8–6	**Floyd (1–0)**	Lucas (0–1)	None	505	18–13	
Apr 15	at VMI	Gray–Minor Stadium • Lexington, VA	**L** 2–5	Morgan (1–1)	**Reeves (2–4)**	Riley (3)	1,814	18–14	0–4
Apr 16	at VMI	Gray–Minor Stadium • Lexington, VA	**L** 2–3	Riley (1–3)	**Beatson (2–2)**	None	132	18–15	0–5
Apr 17	at VMI	Gray–Minor Stadium • Lexington, VA	**W** 22–5^{7}	**Cummiskey (2–0)**	Plummer (1–3)	**Cooper (1)**	154	19–15	1–5
Apr 19	at North Florida*	Harmon Stadium • Jacksonville, FL	**L** 3–12	Griesemer	**Beverly (0–1)**	None	538	19–16	
Apr 20	Charleston Southern*	Joseph P. Riley Jr. Park • Charleston, SC	**W** 6–2	**Floyd (2–0)**	Sendziak (0–1)	**Beatson (1)**	276	20–16	
Apr 22	Western Carolina	Joseph P. Riley Jr. Park • Charleston, SC	**L** 2–4	Franklin (3–1)	**Beckley (4–3)**	Matthews (2)	305	20–17	1–6
Apr 23	Western Carolina	Joseph P. Riley Jr. Park • Charleston, SC	**L** 1–8	Mortenson (3–5)	**Reeves (2–5)**	None	206	20–18	1–7
Apr 24	Western Carolina	Joseph P. Riley Jr. Park • Charleston, SC	**W** 3–0	**Paulsen (4–2)**	Corn (3–2)	**Floyd (1)**	248	21–18	2–7
Apr 26	at Winthrop*	Winthrop Ballpark • Rock Hill, SC	**W** 11–5	**Beatson (2–3)**	Gainey (4–4)	None	214	22–18	
Apr 29	UNC Greensboro	Joseph P. Riley Jr. Park • Charleston, SC	**L** 3–6	Hoppe (6–2)	**Beatson (2–4)**	None	251	22–19	2–8
Apr 30	UNC Greensboro	Joseph P. Riley Jr. Park • Charleston, SC	**L** 0–4	Parsley (7–3)	**Reeves (2–6)**	None	364	22–20	2–9

May
Date	Opponent	Site/stadium	Score	Win	Loss	Save	Attendance	Overall record	SoCon Record
May 1	UNC Greensboro	Joseph P. Riley Jr. Park • Charleston, SC	**L** 3–5	King (1–1)	**Paulsen (4–3)**	Hoppe (2)	227	22–21	2–10
May 6	at Wofford	Russell C. King Field • Spartanburg, SC	**L** 6–8	Rhadans (6–3)	**Hutchins (4–2)**	None	302	22–22	2–11
May 8	at Wofford	Russell C. King Field • Spartanburg, SC	**L** 1–11	Buchanan (4–0)	**Reeves (2–7)**	None		22–23	2–12
May 8	at Wofford	Russell C. King Field • Spartanburg, SC	**L** 5–6	Rhadans (7–3)	**Beatson (2–5)**	None	392	22–24	2–13
May 10	Winthrop*	Joseph P. Riley Jr. Park • Charleston, SC	**L** 6–9^{11}	Jones (2–6)	**Floyd (2–1)**	Lumpkin (1)	227	22–25	
May 13	Samford	Joseph P. Riley Jr. Park • Charleston, SC	**L** 2–8	Cravey (3–3)	**Beckley (4–4)**	None	211	22–26	2–14
May 14	Samford	Joseph P. Riley Jr. Park • Charleston, SC	**W** 5–4^{10}	**Cummiskey (3–0)**	Hobbs (1–4)	None	255	23–26	3–14
May 15	Samford	Joseph P. Riley Jr. Park • Charleston, SC	**W** 10–0^{7}	**Paulsen (5–3)**	Long (2–5)	None	274	24–26	4–14
May 17	at College of Charleston*	CofC Baseball Stadium at Patriots Point • Mount Pleasant, SC	**L** 9–15	Reed (6–0)	**Dunn (1–2)**	None	713	24–27	
May 19	East Tennessee State	Joseph P. Riley Jr. Park • Charleston, SC	**W** 9–2	**Reeves (3–7)**	Kirby (3–3)	**Beckley (2)**	475	25–27	5–14
May 20	East Tennessee State	Joseph P. Riley Jr. Park • Charleston, SC	**L** 6–13	Loyd (4–4)	**Paulsen (5–4)**	Smiddy (2)	563	24–28	5–15
May 21	East Tennessee State	Joseph P. Riley Jr. Park • Charleston, SC	**L** 10–11^{8}	Bollenbacher (5–1)	**Cummiskey (3–1)**	None	415	24–29	5–16

Postseason

SoCon Tournament
Date	Opponent	Seed	Site/stadium	Score	Win	Loss	Save	Attendance	Overall record	SoConT Record
May 25	(5) East Tennessee State	(8)	Fluor Field at the West End • Greenville, SC	**W** 3–1	**Reeves (4–7)**	Kirby (3–4)	None		25–29	1–0
May 25	(4) UNC Greensboro	(8)	Fluor Field at the West End • Greenville, SC	**L** 6–7	Hoppe (8–2)	**Hutchins (4–3)**	None		25–30	1–1
May 26	(2) Mercer	(8)	Fluor Field at the West End • Greenville, SC	**L** 1–2	Kelley (7–0)	**Hutchins (4–4)**	None	1,863	25–31	1–2
