= Garrett Stubbs =

American baseball player (born 1993)

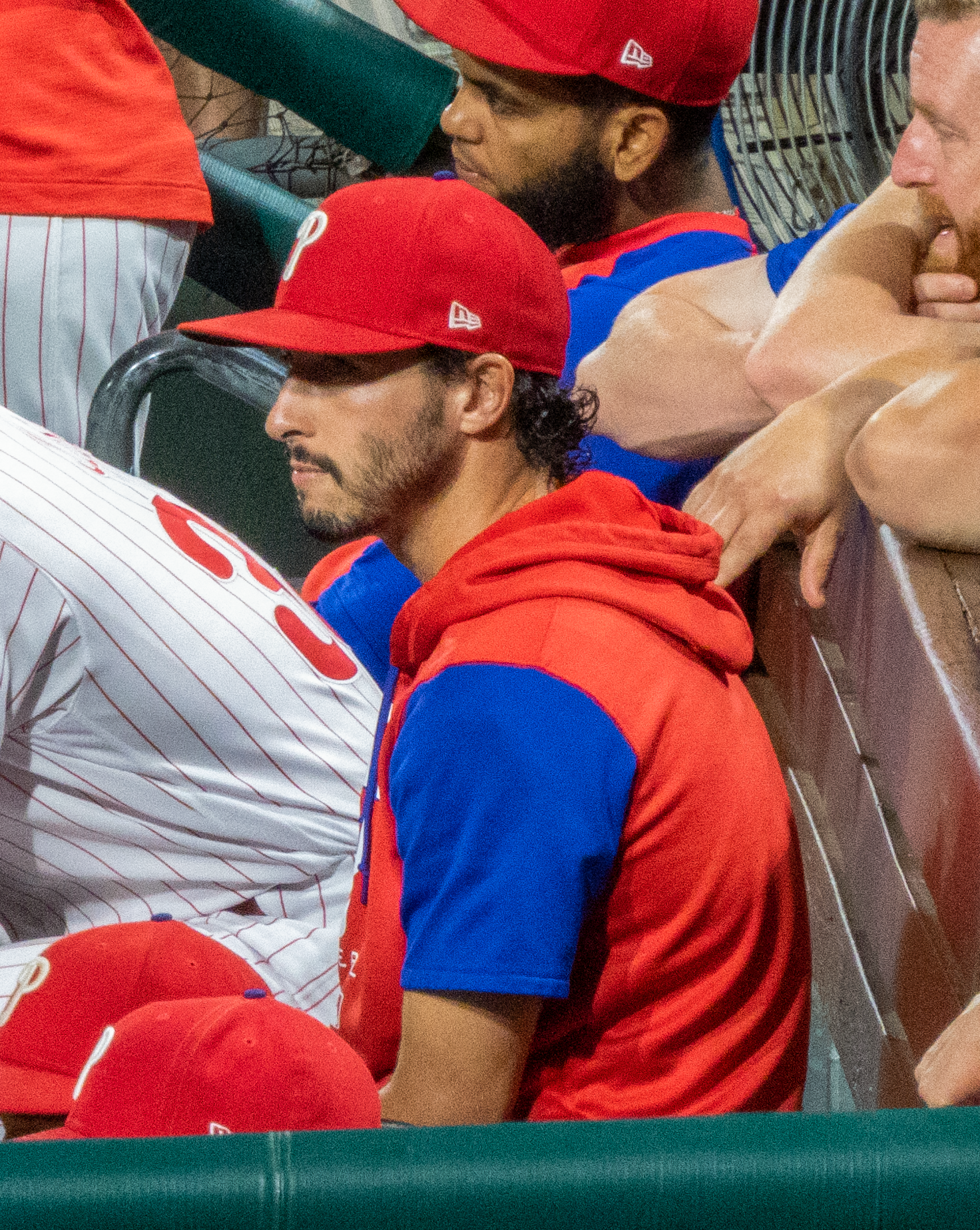
- Stubbs with the Philadelphia Phillies in 2022

Free agent
- Catcher
- Born: May 26, 1993 (age 33); San Diego, California, U.S.
- Bats: Left Throws: Right

MLB debut
- May 28, 2019, for the Houston Astros

MLB statistics (through 2026 season)
- Batting average: .208
- Home runs: 7
- Runs batted in: 48
- Stats at Baseball Reference

Teams
- Houston Astros (2019–2021); Philadelphia Phillies (2022–2026)

Garrett Patrick Stubbs (born May 26, 1993) is an American professional baseball catcher who is a free agent. He has previously played in Major League Baseball (MLB) for the Houston Astros and Philadelphia Phillies. Stubbs played college baseball for the USC Trojans, winning the Johnny Bench Award in 2015 as the nation's best collegiate catcher. The Astros selected Stubbs in the eighth round of the 2015 MLB draft, and he made his MLB debut in 2019. Stubbs played for Team Israel in the 2023 and 2026 World Baseball Classics.

== Early and personal life ==
Stubbs was born in San Diego, California, and was raised in neighboring Del Mar by parents T. Pat Stubbsand Marti Jo Gellens-Stubbs. Born to a Catholic father and Jewish mother, Stubbs is Jewish, had a bar mitzvah, attended Hebrew school, and was one of a record-setting four Jewish MLB players to appear in the 2021 World Series. Garrett and his younger brother CJ Stubbs were both active children; they began playing baseball at a young age but were also involved in music, art competitions, and theater. When Stubbs was a child, the only opportunity for children his age to play baseball was through a Little League organization, and so his father organized a traveling team for local players to continue their development outside of the Little League season. Additionally, Stubbs' step-grandfather Fred Shuey was a successful college baseball player, and Shuey arranged for a young Stubbs to practice his technique with former Major League Baseball (MLB) catcher Ed Herrmann.

Both Stubbs brothers caught for Torrey Pines High School. C.J., who followed Stubbs through Torrey Pines and USC, was taken by the Astros in the 10th round of the 2019 MLB draft, and has played primarily catcher in the minors, while also playing first base and corner outfield; he made his major league debut with the Washington Nationals in 2025. During the baseball offseason, Stubbs lived in California with Matt Chapman, the third baseman for the San Francisco Giants.

On December 14, 2024, Stubbs married his longtime girlfriend Evyn Murray in Los Cabos, Mexico.

== High school ==
Stubbs attended Torrey Pines High School in San Diego, California. In high school, despite being small for a catcher, standing 5 feet 10 inches (1.78 m) and weighing only 165 pounds (75 kg), Stubbs was a two-time All-California Interscholastic Federation Team honoree. During his senior season in 2011, Stubbs batted .391 with 27 runs scored, 13 doubles, and 18 runs batted in (RBIs). He earned both All-North County and All-Avocado League First Team honors as both a junior and senior.

== College career ==
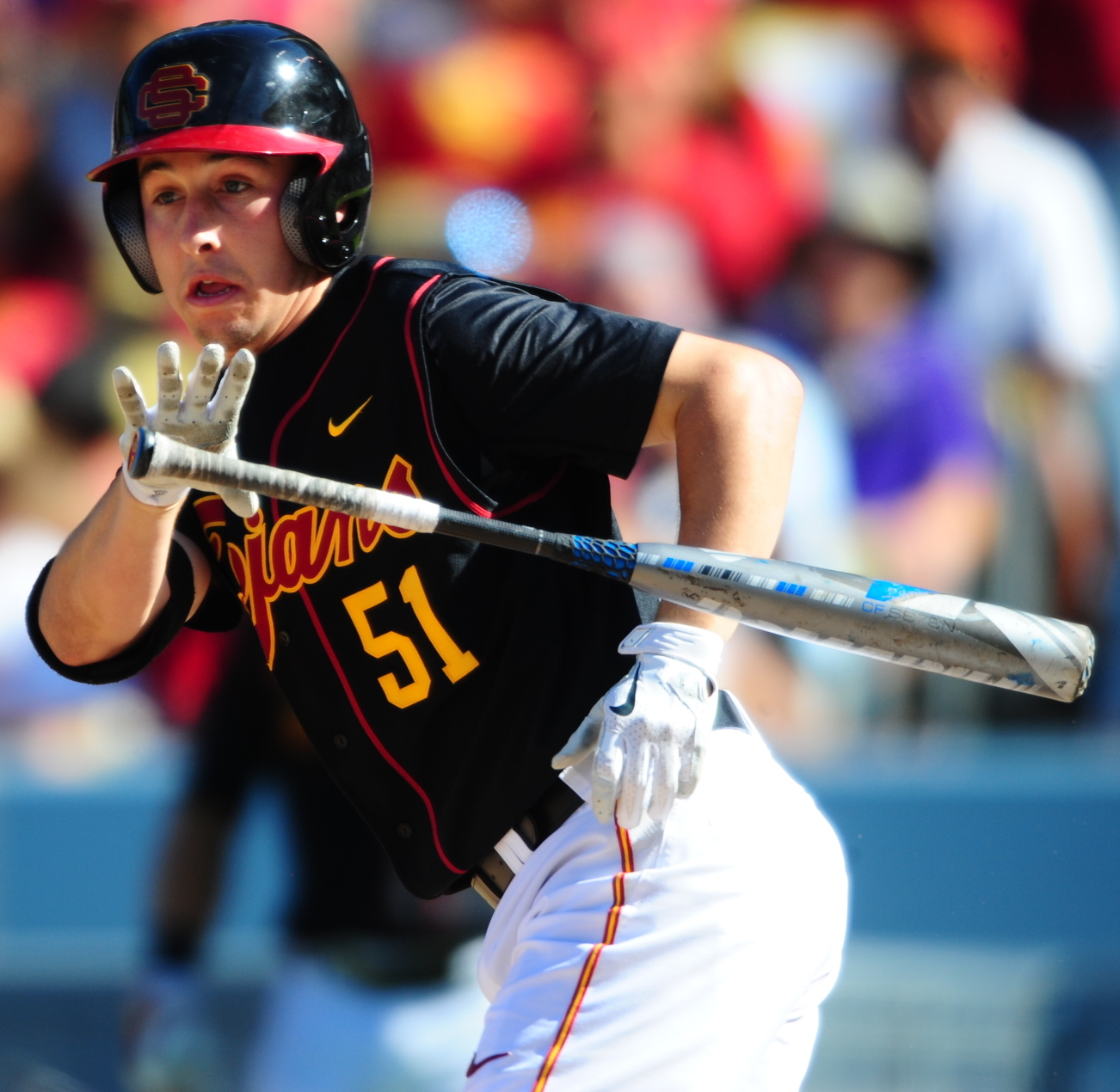
Stubbs at USC in 2015

Stubbs attended the University of Southern California (USC), where he earned a degree in policy planning and development with an emphasis on real estate, and played college baseball for the USC Trojans. In the summer of 2012, he played for the Peninsula Oilers in the Alaska Baseball League.

In 2013 as a sophomore, he was an Honorable Mention for the All-Pac-12 Conference team. In the summer of 2013, he played for the Plymouth Pilgrims in the New England Collegiate Baseball League, and was named a New England Collegiate Baseball League Eastern Division All Star. Later that summer he played for the Cotuit Kettleers of the Cape Cod League. After his junior year, when Stubbs became eligible to be selected in the Major League Baseball (MLB) draft, he made it known that he intended to return to college for his senior year.

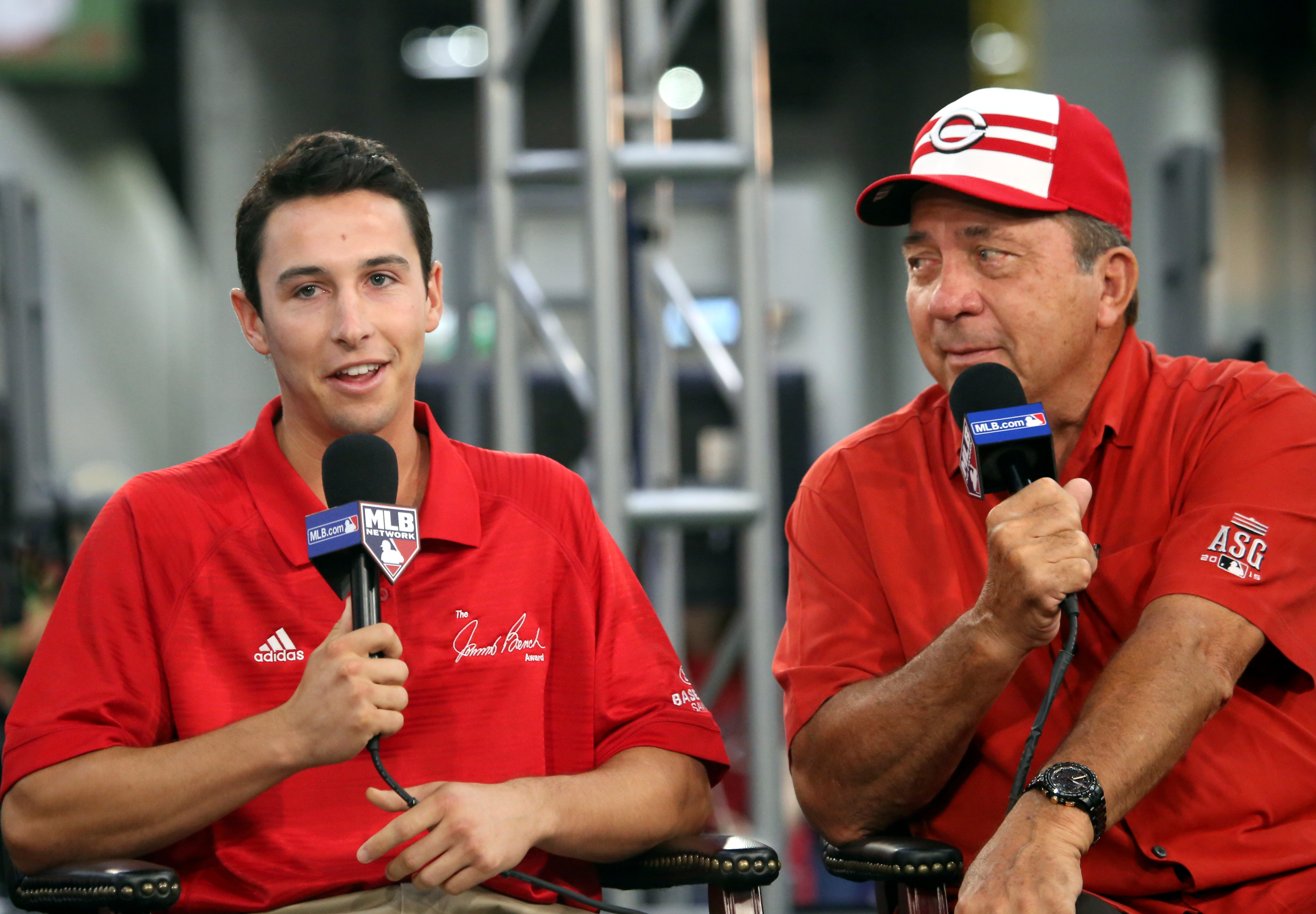
Stubbs (left) with Johnny Bench during the presentation of the Johnny Bench Award in 2015

In 2015, his senior year at USC, Stubbs batted .346 (6th in the Pac-12 Conference) and tied for the conference lead in sacrifices (17), while coming in 3rd in steals (20, in 27 attempts), 5th in runs (51) and OBP (.435), and tied for 7th in doubles (15), as on defense he threw out 52.8% of attempted basestealers and made 3 errors in 468 chances. Stubbs won the Johnny Bench Award as the best catcher in college baseball, the ABCA/Rawlings Gold Glove Award, and was named the Pac-12 Conference's Defensive Player of the Year and All-Pac-12, Baseball America First-Team All-American, Rawlings First-Team All-American, and Jewish Sports Review College Baseball All American.

== Professional career ==
=== Houston Astros (2015–2021) ===
==== Minor leagues ====
The Houston Astros selected Stubbs in the eighth round, with the 229th overall selection, of the 2015 Major League Baseball draft. He signed with the Astros for a signing bonus of $100,000, and made his professional debut with the Tri-City ValleyCats of the Low-A New York–Penn League. After 11 games with Tri-City, the Astros promoted Stubbs to the Quad Cities River Bandits of the Single-A Midwest League. He batted a combined .263 with seven home runs and 21 RBI in 36 games with both teams, while throwing out 56% of attempted base stealers.

In 2016, Stubbs began the season with the Lancaster JetHawks of the High-A California League, with whom he was a California League Mid-Season All Star, before receiving a promotion to the Corpus Christi Hooks of the Double-A Texas League in July. Stubbs finished 2016 with an aggregate .304 batting average, along with 10 home runs, 54 RBI, and 15 stolen bases in 18 attempts, while on defense he threw out 51% of attempted base stealers. He was named an milb.com Houston Organization All Star. After the season, the Astros assigned Stubbs to the Glendale Desert Dogs of the Arizona Fall League.

In 2017, MLB Pipeline named him the best catcher in the Astros' minor league system, and the organization's 11th-best prospect overall. Stubbs began the season with Corpus Christi, where he batted .236 with four home runs and 25 RBI. He was a Double-A Texas League starting All Star, and in the game he tripled and drove in three runs for the winning South. Baseball America named him the best defensive catcher in the Texas League, as he caught 39.5% of attempted basestealers. Stubbs was promoted to the Fresno Grizzlies of the Triple-A Pacific Coast League in August, where he posted a .221 batting average with four home runs and 37 RBI; between the two teams he had 11 stolen bases in 11 attempts.

In 2018, MLB Pipeline named Stubbs the 6th-best prospect overall in the Astros' minor league system. He played the 2018 season for Fresno, for whom he was a mid-season Pacific Coast League All Star. He batted .310/.382/.455 with four home runs and 38 RBI with six stolen bases in six attempts, in 297 at-bats, while on defense he threw out 45% of attempted basestealers. The Astros added him to their 40-man roster after the 2018 season, in order to protect him from the Rule 5 draft.

Stubbs batted .300/.333/.650 in spring training with the Astros in 2019, and was optioned to the team's minor league camp on March 9. He began the 2019 season with the Triple-A Round Rock Express, and was promoted to the major leagues on May 26. With Round Rock, Stubbs batted .240/.332/.397 with 7 home runs and 23 RBI in 204 at-bats, as he stole 12 bases in 14 attempts. On defense, he caught 37% of attempted basestealers.

In his minor league career through 2021, Stubbs batted .272/.366/.397 with 27 home runs and 174 RBI, and stole 51 bases while being caught only 5 times. On defense, he threw out 42% of all attempted base-stealers.

==== Major leagues ====
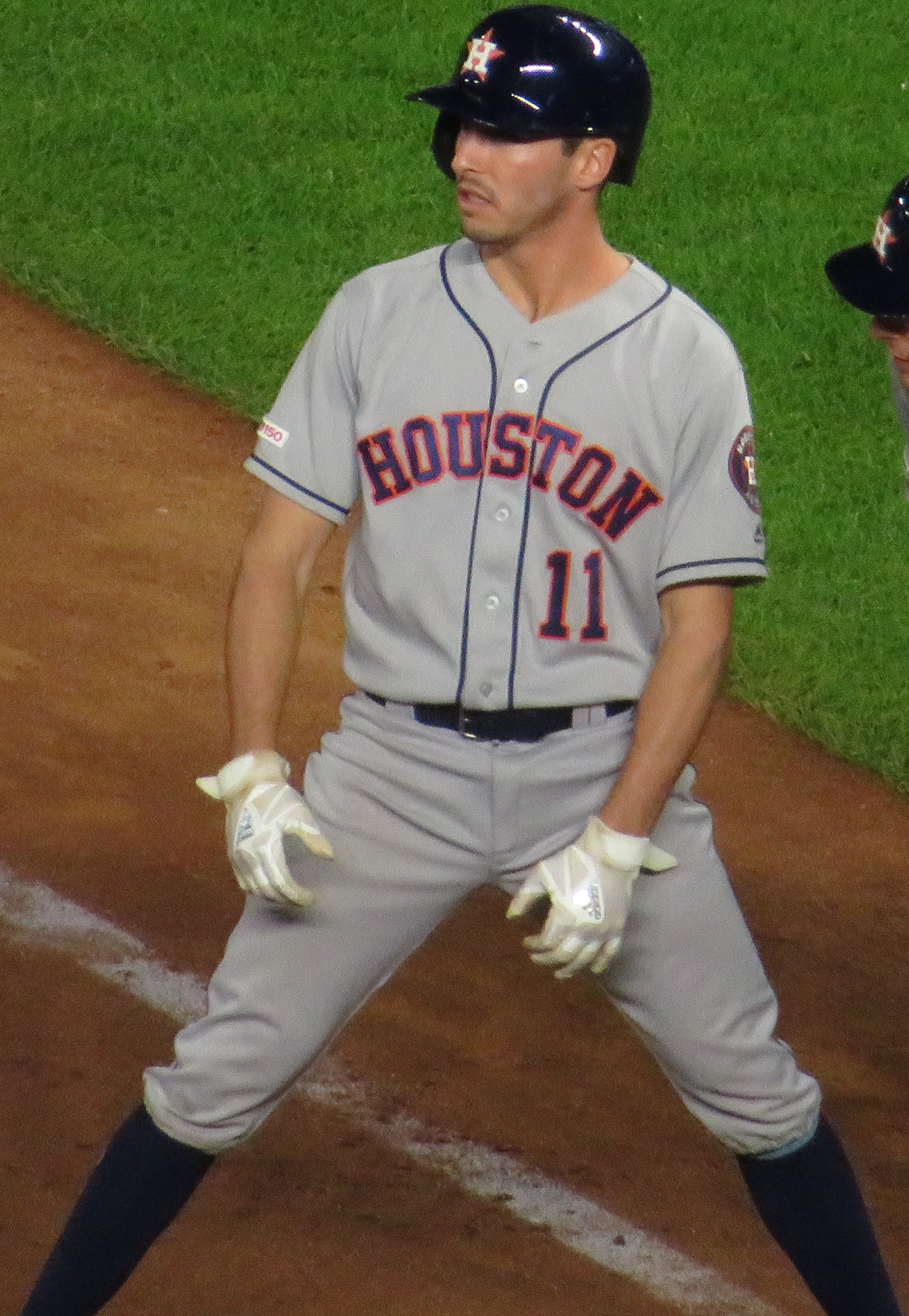
Stubbs with the Houston Astros in 2019

On his 26th birthday, May 26, 2019, Stubbs was called up to the major leagues after Astros catcher Max Stassi went on the 10-day Injury List. Stubbs made his major league debut two days later, on May 28.

In 2019, Stubbs batted .200/.282/.286 with no home runs and two RBI in 35 at-bats for the Astros, as he caught 11 games, played left field in seven games, and played right field in one game, was a pinch runner in four games, and was a pinch hitter in three games. Stubbs had the fastest sprint speed of all American League catchers, at 28.0 feet/second.

In the pandemic-shortened 2020 season, Stubbs batted one-for-eight with a run scored and an RBI in 10 games, as he appeared as a catcher in 8 games, a left fielder in 3 games, a pinch runner in 3 games, and a pinch hitter in two games.

In the 2021 regular season for the Astros, Stubbs batted .176/.222/.235 with 2 runs and 3 RBI in 34 at-bats. Playing for the Triple-A Sugar Land Skeeters, he slashed .265/.418/.363 with 25 runs, two home runs, and 15 RBI in 113 at-bats, as he had more walks (30) than strikeouts (29), and stole four bases without being caught. On defense with the Astros, he caught all three runners who tried to steal against him.

Prior to Game 4 of the 2021 World Series, Stubbs was added to the Astros' roster, replacing Jason Castro who was removed due to COVID-19 protocols. Stubbs played in Game 6 of the World Series.

=== Philadelphia Phillies (2022–present) ===
==== 2022–23 ====
On November 19, 2021, the Astros traded Stubbs to the Philadelphia Phillies in exchange for minor leaguer Logan Cerny. At the time, Stubbs had developed a strong defensive reputation, including a 41% caught-stealing rate in his pro career, as well as strong framing rates according to Baseball Prospectus in his minor league career.

On May 22, 2022, Stubbs hit his first career Major League home run, versus the Los Angeles Dodgers off pitcher Tony Gonsolin. On June 15, Stubbs hit his first career walk-off home run against the Miami Marlins, carrying the Phillies to a 3-1 victory. On September 20, Stubbs, on a rare pitching assignment, used a series of four very slow arcing eephus pitches to put Toronto Blue Jays catcher Danny Jansen behind in the count. The last Stubbs eephus registered 36.9 mph, but his next pitch was an 83.8 mph fastball which earned him a strikeout against the unready Jansen.

In 2022 with the Phillies in the regular season, Stubbs batted .264/.350/.462 in 106 at-bats, with 19 runs, five home runs, and 16 RBI. He played 41 games at catcher, four at designated hitter, four as a pitcher, four as a pinch runner, two as a pinch hitter, and one in left field. Stubbs had the 7th-best average pop time to second base of all major league catchers, in the top seven percent, at 1.91. He was on Philadelphia's 2022 World Series roster, though he did not play.

Stubbs batted .204/.274/.283 in 113 at-bats during the 2023 season, and ranked third in MLB with seven bunt hits. He played 40 games at catcher, and one in left field. Stubbs' pop time to second base at catcher of 1.87 seconds was tied for second-best in major league baseball, behind his Phillies teammate J. T. Realmuto. His five double plays on defense as a catcher were the fourth-most in the NL. Stubbs made his Phillies postseason debut as a defensive replacement in the NLCS. He was chosen as the individual team winner representing the Philadelphia Phillies for the Heart and Hustle Award.

==== 2024–25 ====
In 2024, Stubbs batted .207/.296/.262 in 164 at-bats in the regular season, while stealing five bases without being caught (2nd among NL catchers, bringing his career statistics to 10 stolen bases in 11 attempts). He played 52 games at catcher, and pitched in four games. Among MLB catchers with 50 or more competitive runs, Stubbs had the 3rd-fastest time from home plate to first base, at 4.40 seconds, and the 4th-fastest sprint speed, at 28.0 feet per second. On defense, his pop time to second base at catcher of 1.88 seconds was tied for fourth-best in major league baseball, behind Patrick Bailey, Korey Lee, and his teammate Realmuto, of all catchers with 20 or more attempts.

To begin the 2025 season, the Phillies optioned Stubbs to the Triple-A Lehigh Valley IronPigs in a decision that president of baseball operations Dave Dombrowski admitted was motivated by roster construction issues; Stubbs did not have to be exposed to waivers in order to be optioned, whereas fellow catcher Rafael Marchán was out of options. He had one hitless at bat for the Phillies. For the IronPigs, Stubbs batted .265/.352/.402 in 264 at bats with 8 home runs and 50 RBIs. Against left-handers, he batted .371/.522/.457.

==== 2026 ====
On March 25, 2026, Stubbs was designated for assignment by the Phillies. He cleared waivers and was sent outright to Triple-A Lehigh Valley on March 28. The Phillies promoted Stubbs back to the major leagues following an injury to Realmuto on April 22. On May 4, 2026 against the Miami Marlins, Stubbs threw out two runners attempting to steal a base in the same game for the first time in his career.

With Lehigh Valley in 2026, Stubbs batted .289/.413/.632 with 3 home runs and 8 RBIs in 38 at bats, and stole three bases without being caught, as on defense he played catcher, third base, and left field. With the Phillies, he batted .153/.215/.153 with 11 runs and 3 RBIs in 59 at bats, and was the fastest catcher in major league baseball from home plate to first base (4.32 seconds). On defense, at catcher he threw out 36% of all attempted base-stealers, had the fastest pop time to second base of all major league catchers (1.84 seconds), and led the major leagues in CS Above Average/Throw at 0.19. He also played first base, third base, and left field, was the DH in four games, and pitched 4.2 innings over five games. Starting pitcher Aaron Nola had a 2.82 ERA pitching to Stubbs, a 5.14 ERA pitching to J.T. Realmuto, and a 7.89 ERA pitching to Rafael Marchán. On October 29, he was designated for assignment by the Phillies. Stubbs elected free agency after clearing waivers on November 2.

== Team Israel ==
Stubbs played for Team Israel in the 2023 World Baseball Classic in Miami. During Israel's first game, Stubbs hit a game-winning two-run ground rule double in the eighth inning against Team Nicaragua. Stubbs again played for Team Israel in the 2026 World Baseball Classic, this time alongside his brother CJ Stubbs.

== See also ==
- List of Jewish Major League Baseball players
- List of Jews in sports
