= 2022 Southern Conference baseball tournament =

- Teams: 8
- Format: two bracket Double-elimination tournament with championship game
- Finals site: Fluor Field at the West End; Greenville, SC
- Champions: UNC Greensboro (2nd title)
- Winning coach: Billy Godwin (1st title)
- Television: ESPN+

2022 Southern Conference baseball standings
	Conf.						Overall
Team	W		L		T	PCT	W		L		T	PCT
Wofford ‍†‍‍	16	–	4	–	1	.786	42	–	16	–	1	.720
Mercer ‍‍‍	12	–	9	–	0	.571	40	–	18	–	0	.690
Samford ‍‍‍	12	–	9	–	0	.571	28	–	29	–	0	.491
UNC Greensboro ‍‍‡‍^{y}	12	–	9	–	0	.571	34	–	28	–	0	.548
East Tennessee State ‍‍‍	11	–	10	–	0	.524	31	–	21	–	0	.596
Western Carolina ‍‍‍	9	–	11	–	1	.452	26	–	31	–	1	.457
VMI ‍‍‍	6	–	15	–	0	.286	16	–	40	–	0	.286
The Citadel ‍‍‍	5	–	16	–	0	.238	26	–	31	–	0	.456
† – Conference champion ‡ – Tournament champion y – Invited to the NCAA tournament As of March 12, 2025; Rankings from D1Baseball

The 2022 Southern Conference baseball tournament was held from May 25 through 29 at Fluor Field at the West End in Greenville, South Carolina. The annual event determines the conference champion of the Division I Southern Conference in college baseball. The tournament winner earns the league's bid to the 2022 NCAA Division I baseball tournament. This is the last of 20 athletic championships held by the conference in the 2021–22 academic year.

The tournament was originally held from 1950 to 1953, when the Southern Conference was a large conference composed of several small schools and several large schools, the latter of which would form the Atlantic Coast Conference after the 1953 season. The event was re-established in 1984 and has been held every year since with the exception of 2020 when the COVID-19 pandemic cancelled sporting events across the country. Western Carolina has claimed ten championships, the most of any school, with The Citadel close behind at eight tournament wins. Defending champion Samford has three championships, while Mercer has won two. East Tennessee State and VMI have never won a title, although they both returned to the conference in 2015 after over ten years in other conferences. Furman, which dropped its baseball program before the 2021 season, won two titles.

The tournament will be played in Greenville, which has hosted eight of the past twelve events, including the past five.

== Seeding and format ==
After only including four teams in 2021, the 2022 tournament will return to the previous format. All eight teams will participate in the tournament, with the bottom four seeds playing a single-elimination play-in round. The winners of the single elimination games will join the top 4 teams in the double-elimination tournament. The #3 and #4 seeds will play the winners of the single elimination games in the second round. The #1 and #2 seeds have a bye until the third round where they will play the winners of the second round. The championship will be a double elimination.

== Bracket ==
Play-in round (Wed. 5/25)
5	East Tennessee State	1
8	The Citadel	3
6	Western Carolina	4
7	VMI	1

Second round (Wed. 5/25)
4	UNC Greensboro	7
8	The Citadel	6
3	Samford	22^{7}
6	Western Carolina	3
Third Round Lower (Fri. 5/27)
2	Mercer	2
8	The Citadel	1
4	UNC Greensboro	9
6	Western Carolina	7

Third round (Fri. 5/27)
1	Wofford	6
4	UNC Greensboro	3
2	Mercer	10
3	Samford	13
Lower Semifinal (Sat. 5/28)
2	Mercer	5
4	UNC Greensboro	16^{8}

Semifinals (Sat. 5/28)
1	Wofford	10
3	Samford	3
Lower Final (Sat. 5/28)
3	Samford	2
4	UNC Greensboro	8

Final (Sun. 5/29)
1	Wofford	2	2
4	UNC Greensboro	10	12^{7}

== Schedule ==
Game	Time*	Matchup^{#}	Score
First Round - Single Elimination - Wednesday, May 25
1	9:00 a.m.	No. 5 East Tennessee State vs. No. 8 The Citadel	1-3
2	12:30 p.m.	No. 6 Western Carolina vs. No. 7 VMI	4-1
Second Round - Double Elimination - Wednesday, May 25
3	4:00 p.m.	No. 8 The Citadel vs. No. 4 UNC Greensboro	6-7
4	7:30 p.m.	No. 6 Western Carolina vs. No. 3 Samford	3-22^{RR7}
Third Round - Double Elimination - Friday, May 27
5	9:00 a.m.	No. 4 UNC Greensboro vs. No. 1 Wofford	3-6
6	12:30 p.m.	No. 3 Samford vs. No. 2 Mercer	13-10
Losers Bracket - Friday, May 27
7	4:00 p.m.	No. 6 Western Carolina vs. No. 4 UNC Greensboro	7-9
8	7:30 p.m.	No. 8 The Citadel vs. No. 2 Mercer	1-2
Semifinals - Saturday, May 28
9	12:00 p.m.	No. 1 Wofford vs. No. 3 Samford	10-3
Losers Bracket - Saturday, May 28
10	3:30 p.m.	No. 4 UNC Greensboro vs. No. 2 Mercer	16-5^{RR8}
11	7:00 p.m.	No. 4 UNC Greensboro vs. No. 3 Samford	8-2
Championship - Sunday, May 29
12	12:00 p.m.	No. 1 Wofford vs. No. 4 UNC Greensboro	2-10
13	4:10 p.m.	No. 1 Wofford vs. No. 4 UNC Greensboro	2-12^{RR7}
*Game times in EDT. # – Rankings denote tournament seed. "RRx" denotes run rule applied after x innings.
