= Jake Smith (catcher) =

American baseball player (born 1983)

- Catcher
- Born: June 5, 1983 (age 43); Greensboro, North Carolina, U.S.
- Bats: Right Throws: Right
- Stats at Baseball Reference

Jacob Spencer Smith (born June 5, 1983) is an American former professional baseball catcher.

== Career ==
Smith attended Southern Guilford High School in Greensboro, North Carolina, and played for the school's baseball and American football teams. He enrolled at East Carolina University, where he played for the East Carolina Pirates baseball team. He won the Johnny Bench Award as the top collegiate catcher in 2006.

The Oakland Athletics selected Smith in the 21st round of the 2006 Major League Baseball draft. After his playing career, Smith became the head baseball coach at Randleman High School.
