= 2007 NAIA Division I women's basketball tournament =

- Teams: 32
- Finals site: Oman Arena, Jackson, Tennessee
- Champions: Lambuth Eagles (1st title, 1st title game, 1st Fab Four)
- Runner-up: Cumberland Phoenix (1st title game, 1st Fab Four)
- Semifinalists: Union University Bulldogs (8th Fab Four); Vanguard Lions (3rd Fab Four)
- Coach of the year: Joe Reints (Lambuth)
- Player of the year: Jessica Richter (Vanguard)
- Charles Stevenson Hustle Award: Ashley Cross (Cumberland (TN))
- Chuck Taylor MVP: Reggie Maddox (Lambuth)
- Top scorer: Jessica Richter (Vanguard) (86 points)

The 2007 NAIA Division I women's basketball tournament was the tournament held by the NAIA to determine the national champion of women's college basketball among its Division I members in the United States and Canada for the 2006–07 basketball season.

Lambuth defeated Cumberland (TN) in the championship game, 63–50, to claim the Eagles' first NAIA national title.

The tournament was played at the Oman Arena in Jackson, Tennessee.

== Qualification ==
The tournament field remained fixed at thirty-two teams, which were sorted into one of four quadrants and seeded from 1 to 8 within each quadrant.

The tournament continued to utilize a simple single-elimination format.

== Bracket ==
First round
1	Vanguard	74
8	Harris–Stowe State	64
5	Freed–Hardeman	85
4	Oklahoma City	95
3	Carroll (MT)	56
6	Xavier Louisiana	50
7	Westmont	53
2	Trevecca Nazarene	67
2	Langston	77
7	Azusa Pacific	74
6	Columbia (MO)	68
3	Lewis–Clark State	86
4	Oklahoma Baptist	58
5	Cumberland (TN)	72
8	Brescia	81*
1	Lee (TN)	73
1	Union (TN)	86
8	The Master's	55
5	Oklahoma Christian	77
4	Cumberlands (KY)	64
3	Montana Western	63
6	Houston Baptist	64
7	McKendree	62
2	Lubbock Christian	70
2	Point Loma Nazarene	39
7	Westminster (UT)	53
6	Loyola New Orleans	77
3	Southern Nazarene	78*
4	Auburn Montgomery	46
5	Lambuth	68
8	West Virginia Tech	73
1	Saint Xavier	85

Second round
1	Vanguard	66
4	Oklahoma City	57
3	Carroll (MT)	55
2	Trevecca Nazarene	57
2	Langston	60
3	Lewis–Clark State	40
5	Cumberland (TN)	86
8	Brescia	83
1	Union (TN)	87
5	Oklahoma Christian	61
6	Houston Baptist	82
2	Lubbock Christian	73
7	Westminster (UT)	63
3	Southern Nazarene	80
5	Lambuth	77
1	Saint Xavier	61

Quarterfinals
1	Vanguard	82
2	Trevecca Nazarene	56
2	Langston	71
5	Cumberland (TN)	72
1	Union (TN)	83
6	Houston Baptist	58
3	Southern Nazarene	70
5	Lambuth	77

Semifinals
1	Vanguard	64
5	Cumberland (TN)	68
1	Union (TN)	64
5	Lambuth	66

National championship
5	Cumberland (TN)	50
5	Lambuth	63

== See also ==
- 2007 NAIA Division I men's basketball tournament
- 2007 NCAA Division I women's basketball tournament
- 2007 NCAA Division II women's basketball tournament
- 2007 NCAA Division III women's basketball tournament
- 2007 NAIA Division II women's basketball tournament
