= Bill Brooks (coach, born 1922) =

American baseball and basketball coach (1922–2010)

William Jasper Brooks (October 13, 1922 – November 8, 2010) was an American baseball and basketball coach who is best known for developing the University of North Carolina at Wilmington athletics program from a junior college to a Division I school. Brooks graduated with a Bachelor of Arts from Atlantic Christian College in 1948. In 1951, he was hired by Wilmington College (now UNCW) as their athletic director, basketball coach, baseball coach, and chairman of the health and physical education department. He directed the baseball team to a pair of national junior college baseball championships in 1961 and 1963 and also took the basketball team to the national tournament.

In 1975, he was named NAIA National Coach of the Year and was inducted into the National Junior College Baseball Coaches Hall of Fame in 1990. Brooks became the first individual associated with UNC Wilmington to be inducted into the North Carolina Sports Hall of Fame in 1991.
