= 2007 NCAA Division III women's basketball tournament =

- Teams: 63
- Finals site: Blake Arena, Springfield, Massachusetts
- Champions: DePauw Tigers (1st title)
- Runner-up: WashU Bears (6th title game)
- Third place: Mary Washington Eagles (1st Final Four)
- Fourth place: NYU Violets (2nd Final Four)
- Winning coach: Kris Huffman (1st title)
- MOP: Liz Bondi (DePauw)
- Attendance: 16,113

The 2007 NCAA Division III women's basketball tournament was the 26th annual tournament hosted by the NCAA to determine the national champion of Division III women's collegiate basketball in the United States.

DePauw defeated Washington St. Louis in the championship game, 55–52, to claim the Tigers' first Division III national title.

The championship rounds were hosted by Springfield College at Blake Arena in Springfield, Massachusetts.

== Qualifying ==
For the second consecutive year, the tournament featured sixty-three teams. All teams but one, Howard Payne, started play in the First Round, with the Yellow Jackets receiving the singular bye to the Second Round.

== Bracket ==
=== Top left sectional ===
First round March 2, 2007; Regional hosts
Bowdoin	74
Mount Holyoke	57
Brunswick, ME
Maine Maritime	51
Keene State	61
Cortland State	72
Medaille	67
Cortland, NY
Rochester	65
St. Lawrence	57
Mary Washington	66
Notre Dame Maryland	30
Fredericksburg, VA
Dickinson	49
Christopher Newport	52
Mount Saint Mary	55
Hamilton	58
Scranton, PA
Lehman	43
Scranton	64

Second round March 3, 2007; Regional hosts
Bowdoin	77
Keene State	52
Cortland State	51
Rochester	68
Mary Washington	77
Christopher Newport	61
Hamilton	52
Scranton	58

Sectional semifinals March 9, 2007; Scranton, PA
Bowdoin	63
Rochester	53
Mary Washington	48
Scranton	45

Sectional finals March 10, 2007; Scranton, PA
Bowdoin	59
Mary Washington	64

=== Bottom left sectional ===
First round March 2, 2007; Regional hosts
Emmanuel (MA)	80
Salve Regina	67
Boston, MA
Brandeis	90
Maine–Farmington	66
DePauw	73
Transylvania	54
Greencastle, IN
Denison	82
Hope	66
Wilmington (OH)	76
Oglethorpe	54
Wilmington, OH
Calvin	53
Thomas More	38
Fitchburg State	79
Norwich	60
Gorham, ME
Williams	62
Southern Maine	68

Second round March 3, 2007; Regional hosts
Emmanuel (MA)	71
Brandeis	66
DePauw	74
Denison	66
Wilmington (OH)	67
Calvin	73
Fitchburg State	54
Southern Maine	66

Sectional semifinals March 9, 2007; Boston, MA
Emmanuel (GA)	60
DePauw	74
Calvin	60
Southern Maine	56

Sectional finals March 10, 2007; Boston, MA
DePauw	74
Calvin	61

=== Top right sectional ===
First round March 2, 2007; Regional hosts
Orange, CA/Brownwood, TX
Chapman	108*
La Verne	97
George Fox	61
Gustavus Adolphus	47
Newberg, OR
Puget Sound	69
McMurry	57
Luther	72
Concordia Wisconsin	51
Decorah, IA
Carroll (WI)	86
Illinois Wesleyan	59
Washington St. Louis	54
Manchester	52
Lake Forest, IL
Maryville (MO)	61
Lake Forest	65

Second round March 3, 2007; Regional hosts
Howard Payne	76
Chapman	37
George Fox	48
Puget Sound	51
Luther	74
Carroll (WI)	50
Washington St. Louis	58
Lake Forest	47

Sectional semifinals March 9, 2007; Decorah, IA
Howard Payne	44
Puget Sound	47
Luther	58
Washington St. Louis	59

Sectional finals March 10, 2007; Decorah, IA
Puget Sound	48
Washington St. Louis	57

=== Bottom right sectional ===
First round March 2, 2007; Regional hosts
Messiah	77
Westminster (PA)	65
Grantham, PA
Kean	62
Keuka	51
Randolph-Macon	83
Piedmont	68
Ashland, VA
McDaniel	61
William Paterson	69
Wisconsin–Stout	86
Simpson	91
Menomonie, WI
Saint Benedict	75
Wheaton (IL)	79**
Gwynedd-Mercy	83
Ithaca	74
New York, NY
Ursinus	50
NYU	84

Second round March 3, 2007; Regional hosts
Messiah	84
Kean	89
Randolph-Macon	74
William Paterson	59
Simpson	81
Wheaton (IL)	58
Gwynedd-Mercy	60
NYU	72

Sectional semifinals March 9, 2007; New York, NY
Kean	68
Randolph-Macon	60
Simpson	58
NYU	76

Sectional finals March 10, 2007; New York, NY
Kean	64
NYU	76

=== Final Four ===
Final Four; March 16, 2007; Springfield, MA
Mary Washington	61
DePauw	67
Washington St. Louis	72
NYU	53

National championship March 17, 2007; Springfield, MA
DePauw	55
Washington St. Louis	52
Third place
Mary Washington	74
NYU	63

== All-tournament team ==
- Liz Bondi, DePauw
- Suzy Doughty, DePauw
- Debbie Bruen, Mary Washington
- Jaimie McFarlin, Washington University in St. Louis
- Stephanie Ryba, NYU

== See also ==
- 2007 NCAA Division I women's basketball tournament
- 2007 NCAA Division II women's basketball tournament
- 2007 NAIA Division I women's basketball tournament
- 2007 NAIA Division II women's basketball tournament
- 2007 NCAA Division III men's basketball tournament
