= Buster Posey Award =

College baseball award

- Awarded for: Best catcher in NCAA's Division I
- Sponsored by: Kamerion Wimbley Foundation
- Country: United States
- Presented by: Wichita Sports Commission

History
- First award: 2000
- Most recent: Daniel Jackson, Georgia

The Buster Posey Award, formerly known as the Johnny Bench Award, was created in 2000 to honor college baseball's top catcher in the National Collegiate Athletic Association's Division I. The award is administered by the Wichita Sports Commission and presented after the conclusion of the College World Series.

Originally named for Johnny Bench, it was renamed in 2019 after Johnny Bench announced the creation of his own national award for amateur catchers. The commission reviewed the statistics of the prior winners and unanimously chose to rename the award after Buster Posey.

Schools nominate their catchers during the season to create the official watch list. A select committee of 20 individuals narrows the watch list down to the semifinalists. Two rounds of voting by Division I head coaches determine the three finalists and eventual recipient of the Buster Posey Award. The current holder of the award is Daniel Jackson.

== Winners ==
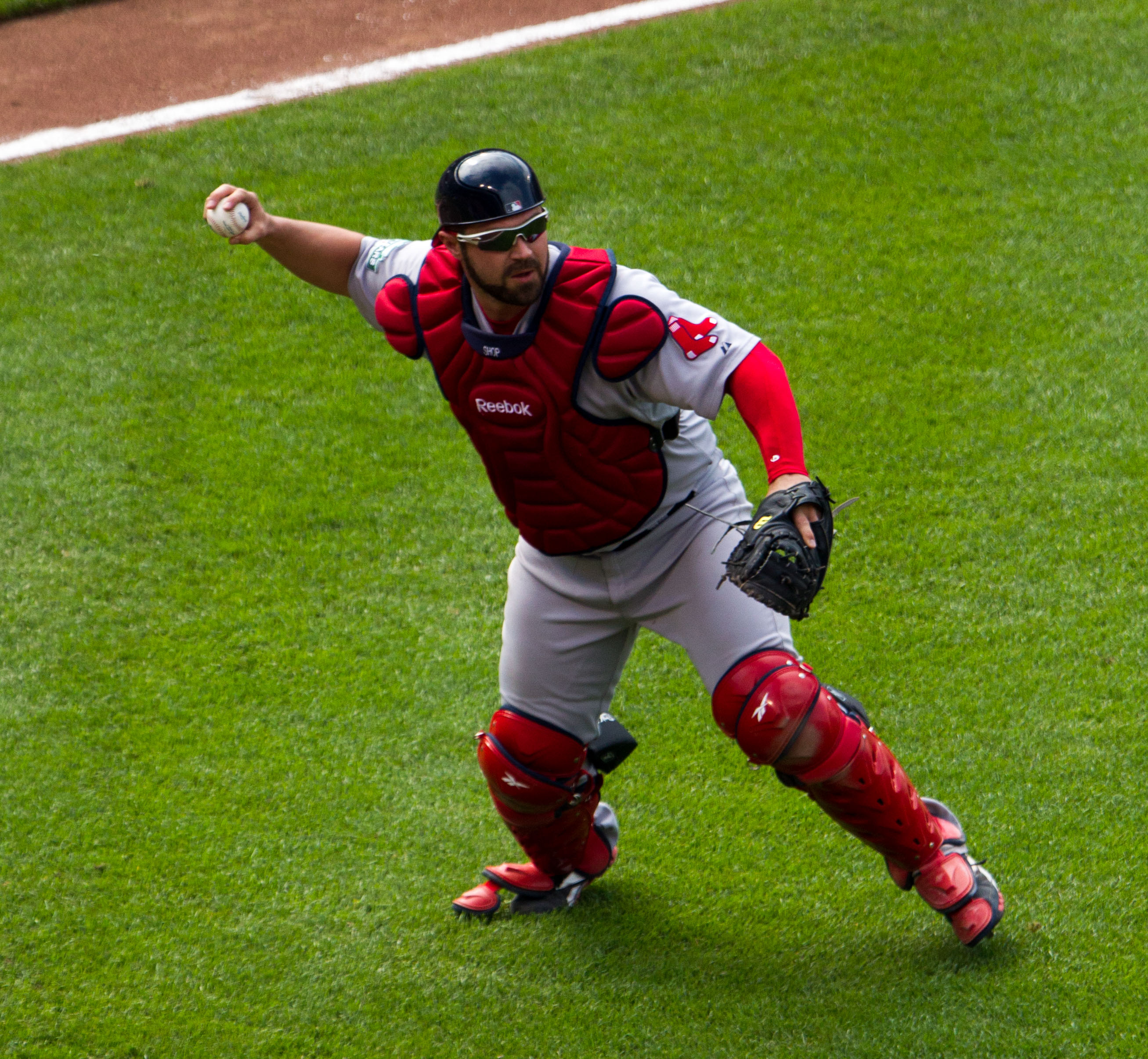
Kelly Shoppach

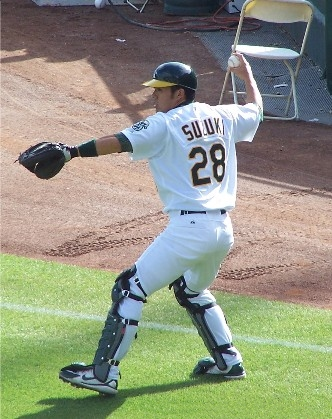
Kurt Suzuki

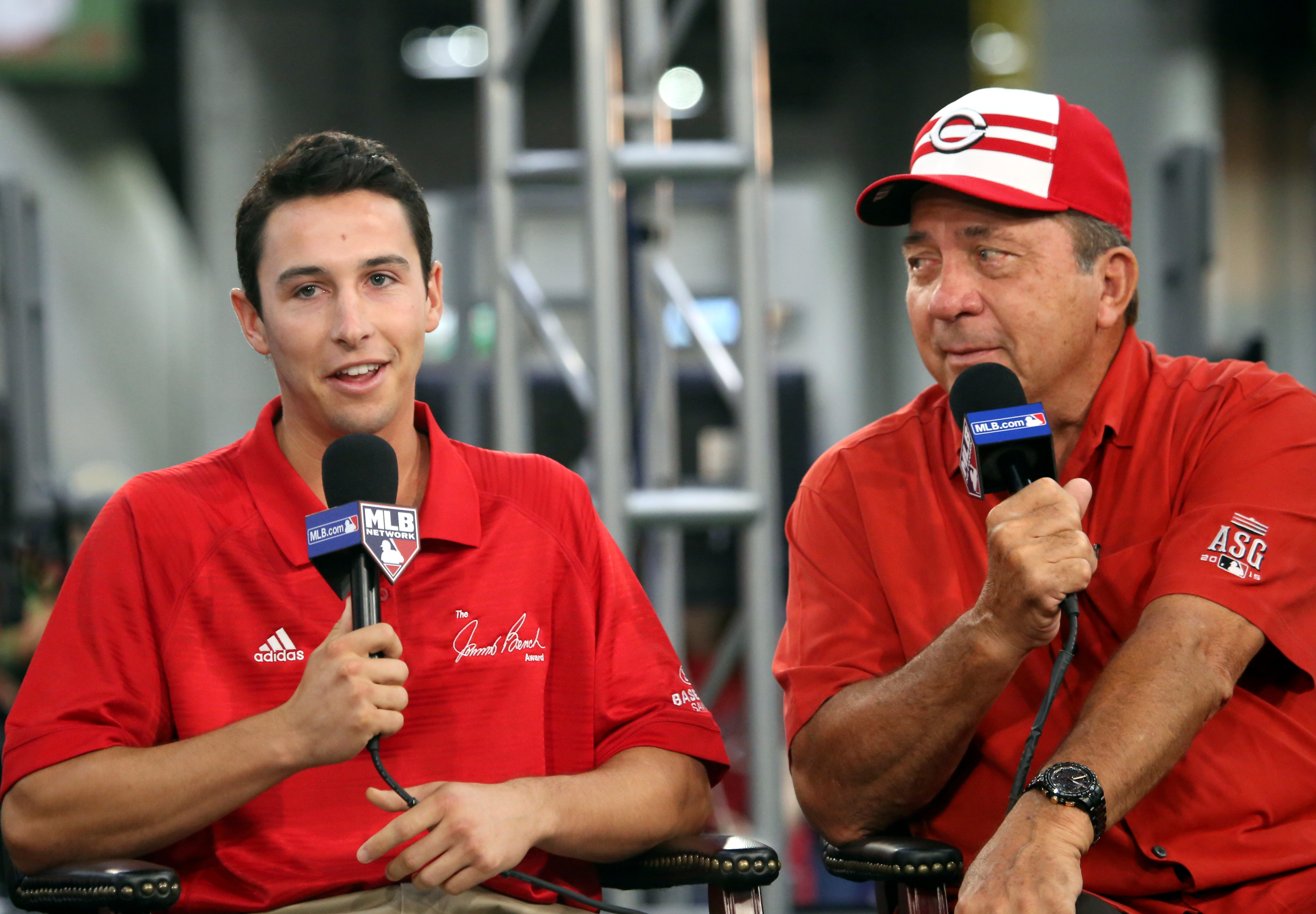
Garrett Stubbs (left), with Johnny Bench.

Key
Year	Links to the article about the corresponding baseball year
Player	Name of the player
School	The player's college when he won the award
Class	The player's year in college when he won the award
^	Player won the MLB Rookie of the Year Award (Note: Won either in the same year or several years later.)
§	Player also won the Golden Spikes Award and Dick Howser Trophy in the same year
‡	Player is active in MLB (Note: A player is considered inactive if he has announced his retirement or not played for a full season.)

Winners
Year	Name	School	Class	Ref(s)
2000	Brad Cresse	Louisiana State	Senior	
2001	Kelly Shoppach	Baylor	Junior	
2002	Jeremy Brown	Alabama	Senior	
2003	Ryan Garko	Stanford	Junior	
2004	Kurt Suzuki^{‡}	Cal State Fullerton	Junior	
2005	Jeff Clement	Southern California	Junior	
2006	Jake Smith	East Carolina	Senior	
2007	Ed Easley	Mississippi State	Junior	
2008	Buster Posey^{§}^{^}	Florida State	Junior	
2009	J. T. Wise	Oklahoma	Senior	
2010	Bryan Holaday^{‡}	TCU	Senior	
2011	Jake Lowery	James Madison	Junior	
2012	Mike Zunino^{‡}^{§}	Florida	Junior	
2013	Stuart Turner	Ole Miss	Junior	
2014	Max Pentecost	Kennesaw State	Junior	
2015	Garrett Stubbs^{‡}	Southern California	Senior	
2016	Zack Collins^{‡}	Miami	Junior	
2017	Matt Whatley^{‡}	Oral Roberts	Junior	
2018	Joey Bart^{‡}	Georgia Tech	Junior	
2019	Adley Rutschman^{‡}^{§}	Oregon State	Junior	
2020	Award not given			
2021	Matheu Nelson^{‡}^{§}	Florida State	Junior	
2022	Kevin Parada^{‡}	Georgia Tech	Sophomore	
2023	Kyle Teel^{‡}	Virginia	Junior	
2024	Walker Janek^{‡}	Sam Houston State	Junior	
2025	Caden Bodine	Coastal Carolina	Junior	
2026	Daniel Jackson	Georgia	Junior	

== See also ==
- List of college baseball awards
