= Barton College =

Private liberal arts college in Wilson, North Carolina, US

Coordinates: 35.7353596°N 77.9131747°W

- Former name: Atlantic Christian College (1902–1990)
- Motto: Habebunt Lumen Vitae
- Motto in English: They shall have the light of life
- Type: Private liberal arts college
- Established: May 1, 1902; 124 years ago
- Religious affiliation: Christian Church (Disciples of Christ)
- President: Douglas N. Searcy
- Students: 1,265 (fall 2022)
- Location: Wilson, North Carolina, US
- Colors: Blue and silver
- Nickname: Bulldogs
- Sporting affiliations: NCAA Division II – Carolinas
- Website: barton.edu

Barton College is a private liberal arts college in Wilson, North Carolina. It is affiliated with the Christian Church (Disciples of Christ). It offers 29 majors and 7 minors as well as 6 master's degrees.

== History ==
Barton College was incorporated as Atlantic Christian College on May 1, 1902, by the North Carolina Christian Missionary Convention, following the purchase of the Kinsey Seminary in 1901. It originally had 107 students and 7 faculty. The college remains affiliated with the Christian Church (Disciples of Christ).

On September 6, 1990, the school changed its name to Barton College in honor of Barton Warren Stone, a founder of the Christian Church (Disciples of Christ) who was active in eastern North Carolina. Through its Division of Lifelong Learning, Barton College opened eastern North Carolina's Barton Weekend College in the fall of 1990. The college has been accredited by the Southern Association for Colleges and Schools since 1953.

== Rankings ==
For 2024, U.S. News & World Report ranked Barton College No.10 out of 131 Regional Universities South, No.6 in Best Value Schools, No.9 in Best Teaching, No.4 in Innovative Colleges, and No.26 in Top Performers on Social Mobility.

Academic rankings

Regional
- U.S. News & World Report: 10

== Undergraduate admissions ==
In 2024, Barton College accepted 94.6% of undergraduate applicants with those admitted having an average 3.25 high school GPA, and with 70% being in the top half of their high school graduating class and 50% in the top quarter. The college does not require submission of standardized test scores, Barton being a test optional school. 81% of Barton College seniors have participated internships, undergraduate research, or field experiences.

== Organization ==
Barton College is composed of four academic schools:

- School of Arts and Humanities
- School of Business and Innovation
- School of Education and Social Sciences
- School of Health Sciences

== Athletics ==
Barton athletic teams are nicknamed as the Bulldogs. The college is a member of the Division II level of the National Collegiate Athletic Association (NCAA), primarily competing in Conference Carolinas since the 1930–31 academic year. Its mascot is the Bulldog and their colors are royal blue and white.

Barton competes in 22 intercollegiate varsity sports: Men's sports include baseball, basketball, cross country, football, golf, lacrosse, soccer, swimming, tennis, track & field and volleyball; while women's sports include basketball, cheerleading, cross country, golf, lacrosse, soccer, softball, swimming, tennis, track & field and volleyball. On January 27, 2018, Barton announced that the school would be fielding football again.

== Notable alumni ==
- Thomas Albert – composer and educator
- Bill Brooks – college basketball coach
- Chris Flemmings – professional basketball player
- Jentezen Franklin – pastor and televangelist
- Aaron Fussell – state politician
- Ava Gardner – actress and singer (dropped out)
- Billy Godwin – college baseball coach
- Kameron Johnson — NFL wide receiver and return specialist
- Walter B. Jones Jr. – congressman
- Conor Mccreedy – artist (dropped out)
- Sam Ragan – journalist and poet
- Joe P. Tolson – state politician
- Michael H. Wray – state politician
