= 2007 NCAA Division II men's basketball tournament =

- Teams: 64
- Finals site: MassMutual Center, Springfield, Massachusetts
- Champions: Barton (1st title)
- Runner-up: Winona State (2nd title game)
- Semifinalists: CSU San Bernardino (1st Final Four); Central Missouri (2nd Final Four)
- Winning coach: Ron Lievense (1st title)
- MOP: Anthony Atkinson (Barton)

The 2007 NCAA Division II men's basketball tournament was the 51st annual single-elimination tournament to determine the national champion of men's NCAA Division II college basketball in the United States.

Officially culminating the 2006–07 NCAA Division II men's basketball season, the tournament featured sixty-four teams from around the country.

The Elite Eight, national semifinals, and championship were again played at the MassMutual Center in Springfield, Massachusetts.

Barton (31–5) defeated defending champions Winona State in the final, 77–75, to win their first Division II national championship.

The Bulldogs were coached by Ron Lievense. Barton's Anthony Atkinson, who scored a buzzer-beating layup in the championship game, was the Most Outstanding Player.

2007 NCAA Division II Men's sites - regionals (cyan) Elite Eight (red)

== Regionals ==
=== Northeast - Waltham, Massachusetts ===
Location: Dana Center Host: Bentley College

First round Round of 64; March 10
1	Bentley	59
8	Caldwell	56
4	Bridgeport	67
5	Philadelphia	65
3	Bryant	77
6	Adelphi	55
2	Saint Rose	87
7	Pace	79

Regional semifinal Round of 32; March 11
1	Bentley	60
4	Bridgeport	45
3	Bryant	65
2	Saint Rose	62

Regional final Sweet 16; March 13
1	Bentley	63
3	Bryant	54

=== North Central - Winona, Minnesota ===
Location: McCown Gymnasium Host: Winona State University

First round Round of 64; March 10
1	Winona State	100
8	St. Cloud State	73
4	South Dakota	91
5	Nebraska–Kearney	95
3	Metro State	71
6	Adams State	48
2	Minnesota State	85
7	Fort Lewis	71

Regional semifinal Round of 32; March 11
1	Winona State	81
5	Nebraska-Kearney	70
3	Metro State	68
2	Minnesota State	70

Regional final Sweet 16; March 13
1	Winona State	89
2	Minnesota State	76

=== South - Montevallo, Alabama ===
Location: People's Bank and Trust Arena Host: University of Montevallo

First round Round of 64; March 10
1	Montevallo	78
8	Albany State	62
4	Barry	44
5	Henderson State	58
3	Benedict	56
6	Eckerd	66
2	Rollins	61
7	Valdosta State	60

Regional semifinal Round of 32; March 11
1	Montevallo (OT)	66
5	Henderson State	58
6	Eckerd	85
2	Rollins	76

Regional final Sweet 16; March 13
1	Montevallo	64
6	Eckerd	61

=== South Central - Warrensburg, Missouri ===
Location: UCM Fieldhouse Host: Central Missouri State University

First round Round of 64; March 10
1	Central Missouri	76
8	St. Edward's	39
4	Northwest Missouri State	75
5	Pittsburg State	53
3	Midwestern State	86
6	West Texas A&M	81
2	Southeastern Oklahoma State	79
7	Emporia State	66

Regional semifinal Round of 32; March 11
1	Central Missouri	72
4	Northwest Missouri State	61
3	Midwestern State	77
2	Southeastern Oklahoma State	88

Regional final Sweet 16; March 13
1	Central Missouri	67
2	Southeastern Oklahoma State	54

=== East - Wilson, North Carolina ===
Location: Wilson Gym Host: Barton College

First round Round of 64; March 10
1	Barton	85
8	Queens (NC)	76
4	Alderson Broaddus	75
5	West Virginia State	91
3	Millersville (OT)	89
6	Mount Olive	85
2	West Liberty	79
7	California (PA)	82

Regional semifinal Round of 32; March 11
1	Barton	86
5	West Virginia State	85
3	Millersville	82
7	California (PA)	72

Regional final Sweet 16; March 13
1	Barton	76
3	Millersville	65

=== Great Lakes - Findlay, Ohio ===
Location: Houdeshell Court at Croy Gymnasium Host: University of Findlay

First round Round of 64; March 10
1	Findlay	74
8	Wisconsin–Parkside	60
4	Northern Kentucky	73
5	Drury	68
3	Grand Valley State	85
6	Quincy	73
2	Southern Indiana	84
7	Rockhurst	78

Regional semifinal Round of 32; March 11
1	Findlay	56
4	Northern Kentucky	60
3	Grand Valley State	92
2	Southern Indiana	83

Regional final Sweet 16; March 13
4	Northern Kentucky	42
3	Grand Valley State	66

=== South Atlantic - Augusta, Georgia ===
Location: Christenberry Fieldhouse Host: Augusta State University

First round Round of 64; March 10
1	Augusta State	79
8	Elizabeth City State	53
4	Armstrong Atlantic	68
5	Wingate	72
3	Clayton State (OT)	72
6	Catawba	69
2	Virginia Union	74
7	Lander	68

Regional semifinal Round of 32; March 11
1	Augusta State	78
5	Wingate	79
3	Clayton State	70
2	Virginia Union	71

Regional final Sweet 16; March 13
5	Wingate	73
2	Virginia Union	56

=== West - Arcata, California ===
Location: East Gym Host: Humboldt State University

First round Round of 64; March 10
1	Humboldt State	68
8	Alaska–Anchorage	61
4	Seattle Pacific	65
5	Grand Canyon	87
3	Cal Poly-Pomona	55
6	Seattle University	69
2	Cal State-San Bernardino	71
7	BYU-Hawaii	68

Regional semifinal Round of 32; March 11
1	Humboldt State	95
5	Grand Canyon	81
6	Seattle University	66
2	Cal State-San Bernardino	72

Regional final Sweet 16; March 13
1	Humboldt State	66
2	Cal State-San Bernardino	68

== Elite Eight–Springfield, Massachusetts ==
Location: MassMutual Center Hosts: American International College and Naismith Memorial Basketball Hall of Fame

National Quarterfinals; Elite Eight; March 21
E	Barton	83^{OT}
GL	Grand Valley State	81
W	Cal State San Bernardino	100
SA	Wingate	73
Springfield, Massachusetts
SC	Central Missouri	86
S	Montevallo	69
NC	Winona State	64
NE	Bentley	51

National semifinals Final Four; March 22
E	Barton	80
W	Cal State San Bernardino	79
SC	Central Missouri	85
NC	Winona State	90^{OT}

National championship March 24
E	Barton	77
NC	Winona State	75

== All-tournament team ==
- Anthony Atkinson, Barton (MOP)
- Jonte Flowers, Winona State
- Zack Malvik, Winona State
- John Smith, Winona State
- Zack Wright, Central Missouri

== See also ==
- 2007 NCAA Division I men's basketball tournament
- 2007 NCAA Division III men's basketball tournament
