= 2007 NCAA Division III men's basketball tournament =

American collegiate men's basketball tournament (2007)

- Teams: 59
- Finals site: , Salem, Virginia
- Champions: Amherst (1st title)
- Runner-up: Virginia Wesleyan (2nd title game)
- Semifinalists: Washington–St. Louis (1st Final Four); Wooster (2nd Final Four)
- Winning coach: David Hixon (Amherst)
- MOP: Andrew Olson (Amherst)
- Attendance: 60,619

The 2007 NCAA Division III men's basketball tournament was a single-elimination tournament to determine the men's collegiate basketball national champion of National Collegiate Athletic Association (NCAA) Division III. It began on March 1, 2007, and concluded on March 17, 2007, with a championship game in the Salem Civic Center of Salem, Virginia, which was won by Amherst College over Virginia Wesleyan 80-67.

== Qualifying teams ==
The Division III Championships Committee selected 59 schools to participate in the 2007 tournament. Thirty-seven teams earned automatic qualification by winning their respective conferences. Additionally, four independent (not affiliated with a conference with an automatic bid) teams and 18 other at-large teams from the remaining independent teams and automatic qualifying conferences — who did not receive their conference automatic qualification—were selected.

School	Conference	Record	Berth Type
Lake Erie	Allegheny Mountain Collegiate Conference	25-2	Conference Champion
Mississippi College	American Southwest Conference	25-2	Conference Champion
Catholic	Capital Athletic Conference	22-5	Conference Champion
Johns Hopkins	Centennial Conference	23-4	Conference Champion
York	City University of New York Athletic Conference	18-10	Conference Champion
Augustana (IL)	College Conference of Illinois and Wisconsin	22-5	Conference Champion
Widener	Commonwealth Conference	14-12	Conference Champion
Wentworth Tech	Commonwealth Coast Conference	17-11	Conference Champion
St. John Fisher	Empire 8	22-5	Conference Champion
King's (PA)	Freedom Conference	19-8	Conference Champion
Rivier	Great Northeast Athletic Conference	20-8	Conference Champion
Transylvania	Heartland Collegiate Athletic Conference	19-8	Conference Champion
Loras	Iowa Intercollegiate Athletic Conference	21-6	Conference Champion
St. Lawrence	Liberty League	22-5	Conference Champion
Rhode Island College	Little East Conference	24-3	Conference Champion
Salem State	Massachusetts State College Athletic Conference	24-2	Conference Champion
Calvin	Michigan Intercollegiate Athletic Association	18-9	Conference Champion
Carroll (WI)	Midwest Conference	16-8	Conference Champion
St. Thomas (MN)	Minnesota Intercollegiate Athletic Conference	24-3	Conference Champion
Williams	New England Small College Athletic Conference	16-11	Conference Champion
Coast Guard	New England Women's and Men's Athletic Conference	14-13	Conference Champion
Ramapo	New Jersey Athletic Conference	21-7	Conference Champion
Elms	North Atlantic Conference	20-8	Conference Champion
Wooster	North Coast Athletic Conference	25-3	Conference Champion
Villa Julie	North Eastern Athletic Conference	20-7	Conference Champion
Whitworth	Northwest Conference	23-3	Conference Champion
Capital	Ohio Athletic Conference	19-8	Conference Champion
Hampden-Sydney	Old Dominion Athletic Conference	18-10	Conference Champion
Alvernia	Pennsylvania Athletic Conference	23-4	Conference Champion
Manhattanville	Skyline Conference	23-5	Conference Champion
Fontbonne	St. Louis Intercollegiate Athletic Conference	16-11	Conference Champion
Occidental	Southern California Intercollegiate Athletic Conference	19-5	Conference Champion
Centre	Southern Collegiate Athletic Conference	23-4	Conference Champion
SUNY-Plattsburgh	State University of New York Athletic Conference	20-8	Conference Champion
Washington (MO)	University Athletic Association	20-4	Conference Champion
Averett	USA South Athletic Conference	20-6	Conference Champion
Wisconsin-Stevens Point	Wisconsin Intercollegiate Athletic Conference	25-2	Conference Champion
Aurora	Independent	25-2	Independent selection
Lincoln (PA)	Independent	18-8	Independent selection
Maryville (TN)	Independent	21-6	Independent selection
Westminster (PA)	Independent	18-8	Independent selection
Amherst	New England Small College Athletic Conference	25-2	At-large
Brandeis	University Athletic Association	22-5	At-large
Chicago	University Athletic Association	20-5	At-large
DePauw	Southern Collegiate Athletic Conference	22-5	At-large
Guilford	Old Dominion Athletic Conference	21-4	At-large
Hood	Capital Athletic Conference	21-7	At-large
Hope	Michigan Intercollegiate Athletic Association	23-4	At-large
John Carroll	Ohio Athletic Conference	19-9	At-large
Keene State	Little East Conference	23-5	At-large
Mary Hardin-Baylor	American Southwest Conference	22-5	At-large
Messiah	Commonwealth Conference	19-6	At-large
Rochester	University Athletic Association	18-7	At-large
St. John's (MN)	Minnesota Intercollegiate Athletic Conference	20-7	At-large
SUNY-Brockport	State University of New York Athletic Conference	23-5	At-large
Stevens Tech	Empire 8	21-6	At-large
Trinity (CT)	New England Small College Athletic Conference	21-4	At-large
Virginia Wesleyan	Old Dominion Athletic Conference	23-4	At-large
Worcester Poly	Liberty League	22-3	At-large

== Bracket ==
=== Top left sectional ===
First round
St. John's (MN)	85*
Loras	82
Washington–St. Louis	77
Fontbonne	58
Whitworth	62*
DePauw	59
Aurora	68
Calvin	69
Hope	76
Chicago	54
Augustana (IL)	69
Carroll (WI)	73

Second round
UW–Stevens Point	93
St. John's (MN)	76
Washington–St. Louis	63
Whitworth	61
Calvin	64
Hope	80
Carroll (WI)	86
St. Thomas (MN)	80

Sectional semifinals
UW–Stevens Point	66
Washington–St. Louis	78
Hope	89
Carroll (WI)	77

Sectional finals
Washington–St. Louis	58
Hope	55

=== Bottom left sectional ===
First round
Catholic	58
Messiah	37
Alvernia	76
Lincoln (PA)	91
Johns Hopkins	84
Villa Julie	72
Guilford	101
Manhattanville	81
Virginia Wesleyan	63
Averett	60
Hampden–Sydney	68
Hood	65
Mississippi College	68
Occidental	51
Mary Hardin–Baylor	62
Maryville (TN)	73

Second round
Catholic	70
Lincoln (PA)	81
Johns Hopkins	73
Guilford	80
Virginia Wesleyan	61
Hampden–Sydney	51
Mississippi College	76
Maryville (TN)	56

Sectional semifinals
Lincoln (PA)	128
Guilford	129***
Virginia Wesleyan	81
Mississippi College	55

Sectional finals
Guilford	71
Virginia Wesleyan	81

=== Top right sectional ===
First round
King's (PA)	63
Widener	76
Ramapo	77
York (NY)	68
WPI	57
Stevens	68
Rhode Island College	64
Coast Guard	60
Trinity (CT)	70
Brandeis	77*
Keene State	81
Rivier	47

Second round
Amherst	87
Widener	70
Ramapo	61
Stevens	69
Rhode Island College	70
Brandeis	67
Keene State	76
Salem State	75

Sectional semifinals
Amherst	97
Stevens	74
Rhode Island College	75
Keene State	73

Sectional finals
Amherst	81
Rhode Island College	69

=== Bottom right sectional ===
First round
St. John Fisher	98
Wentworth	72
Rochester	60
Plattsburgh State	61
St. Lawrence	85
Elms	79
Brockport State	74
Williams	66
Wooster	92
Transylvania	66
Centre	69
Capital	55
John Carroll	87
Westminster (PA)	83

Second round
St. John Fisher	95
Plattsburgh State	87
St. Lawrence	49
Brockport State	74
Wooster	73
Centre	56
John Carroll	79
Lake Erie	77

Sectional semifinals
St. John Fisher	91
Brockport State	105
Wooster	83
John Carroll	73

Sectional finals
Brockport State	87
Wooster	94*

== Final Four ==
- Site: Salem Civic Center, Salem, Virginia

National Semifinals
Washington–St. Louis	65
Virginia Wesleyan	67
Amherst	67
Wooster	60

National Championship
Virginia Wesleyan	67
Amherst	80
National Third-place
Washington–St. Louis	92
Wooster	84

== See also ==
- 2007 NCAA Division III women's basketball tournament
