= 2026 NCAA Division II men's basketball tournament =

Upcoming single-elimination tournament

- Teams: 64
- Finals site: Championship game: Gainbridge Fieldhouse, Indianapolis, Indiana
- Champions: Gannon (1st title)
- Runner-up: Lander (1st title game)
- Semifinalists: Nova Southeastern (4th Final Four); Oklahoma Baptist (1st Final Four)
- Winning coach: Easton Bazzoli (1st title)
- MOP: Pace Prosser (Gannon)

The 2026 NCAA Division II men's basketball tournament was a single-elimination tournament to determine the national champion of men's NCAA Division II college basketball in the United States, the culmination of the 2025–26 NCAA Division II men's basketball season.

The tournament featured 64 teams, with teams placed into one of eight geographically oriented, eight-team regionals. The first three rounds were played on campus sites. The quarterfinals and semifinals were held at UPMC Cooper Fieldhouse in Pittsburgh, and the national championship game was held at Gainbridge Fieldhouse in Indianapolis on April 5.

Goldey–Beacom, Lake Erie, Western New Mexico, and Young Harris participated in the tournament for the first time.

== Qualifying ==
A total of 64 bids are available for the tournament: 23 automatic bids (awarded to the champions of the twenty-three Division II conferences) and 41 at-large bids.

The bids are allocated evenly among the eight NCAA-designated regions (Atlantic, Central, East, Midwest, South, South Central, Southeast, and West), each of which contains either two or three of the 23 Division II conferences that sponsor men's basketball. Each region consists of two or three automatic qualifiers (the teams that won their respective conference tournaments) and either five or six at-large bids, awarded regardless of conference affiliation.

=== Automatic bids (23) ===
Automatic bids
Region (Bids)	Conference	School	Record (Conf.)	Appearance	Last bid
Atlantic (3)	CIAA	Fayetteville State	23–6 (14–2)	5th	2025
Atlantic (3)	Mountain East	West Liberty	27–4 (18–2)	18th	2025
Atlantic (3)	PSAC	California (PA)	22–8 (16–4)	16th	2024
Central (3)	Great American	Harding	24–7 (17–5)	8th	2025
Central (3)	MIAA	Washburn	31–1 (18–1)	18th	2025
Central (3)	Northern Sun	Minnesota–Duluth	21–11 (14–9)	9th	2024
East (3)	CACC	Felician	27–3 (19–1)	3rd	2022
East (3)	East Coast	Daemen	30–1 (16–0)	6th	2025
East (3)	Northeast–10	Saint Anselm	23–7 (14–4)	26th	2023
Midwest (3)	GLIAC	Grand Valley State	25–6 (15–5)	12th	2019
Midwest (3)	GLVC	William Jewell	22–9 (15–5)	2nd	2024
Midwest (3)	Great Midwest	Walsh	27–3 (17–3)	5th	2024
South (3)	Gulf South	West Florida	25–8 (15–7)	2nd	2018
South (3)	SIAC	Morehouse	22–9 (19–5)	8th	2018
South (3)	Sunshine State	Nova Southeastern	27–1 (19–1)	7th	2025
South Central (2)	Lone Star	Dallas Baptist	27–6 (18–2)	10th	2025
South Central (2)	RMAC	Black Hills State	27–4 (17–3)	3rd	2023
Southeast (3)	Carolinas	Young Harris	22–8 (16–4)	1st	Never
Southeast (3)	Peach Belt	Lander	25–5 (17–3)	8th	2024
Southeast (3)	South Atlantic	Anderson (SC)	29–2 (20–2)	5th	2014
West (3)	CCAA	Cal State East Bay	30–0 (22–0)	6th	1988
West (3)	Great Northwest	Saint Martin's	25–5 (15–3)	4th	2023
West (3)	PacWest	Point Loma	25–5 (18–4)	8th	2025

=== At-large bids (41) ===
At-large bids
Region (Bids)	Conference	School	Record (Conf.)	Appearance	Last bid
Atlantic (5)	Mountain East	Charleston (WV)	19–9 (14–6)	10th	2024
Atlantic (5)	Mountain East	Fairmont State	26–5 (12–4)	16th	2025
Atlantic (5)	PSAC	Gannon	28–3 (19–1)	28th	2025
Atlantic (5)	PSAC	Indiana (PA)	22–7 (15–5)	20th	2023
Atlantic (5)	CIAA	Virginia Union	24–5 (17–3)	31st	2023
Central (5)	MIAA	Central Missouri	23–9 (14–5)	23rd	2015
Central (5)	MIAA	Missouri Western	21–11 (12–7)	12th	2021
Central (5)	Great American	Oklahoma Baptist	26–2 (20–2)	3rd	2021
Central (5)	MIAA	Rogers State	21–10 (13–6)	2nd	2020
Central (5)	Northern Sun	St. Cloud State	25–6 (20–2)	16th	2019
East (5)	Northeast–10	Adelphi	18–11 (10–8)	19th	2025
East (5)	Northeast–10	Assumption	17–12 (11–7)	29th	2025
East (5)	Northeast–10	Bentley	19–9 (12–6)	21st	2023
East (5)	CACC	Goldey–Beacom	21–10 (13–7)	1st	Never
East (5)	Northeast–10	Saint Michael's	18–13 (10–8)	14th	2024
Midwest (5)	Great Midwest	Ashland	20–10 (13–7)	12th	2023
Midwest (5)	Great Midwest	Lake Erie	23–8 (15–5)	1st	Never
Midwest (5)	GLIAC	Michigan Tech	26–6 (16–4)	13th	2025
Midwest (5)	GLIAC	Northern Michigan	27–6 (16–4)	12th	2025
Midwest (5)	GLVC	Rockhurst	23–6 (17–3)	4th	2009
South (5)	Gulf South	Alabama–Huntsville	21–9 (15–7)	18th	2025
South (5)	Sunshine State	Florida Southern	25–8 (14–6)	35th	2025
South (5)	Gulf South	Montevallo	20–10 (15–7)	13th	2025
South (5)	Sunshine State	Palm Beach Atlantic	26–5 (16–4)	2nd	2020
South (5)	Gulf South	West Alabama	26–5 (19–3)	8th	2023
South Central (6)	RMAC	Colorado Mesa	21–10 (15–5)	12th	2024
South Central (6)	Lone Star	Eastern New Mexico	26–5 (17–3)	4th	2024
South Central (6)	Lone Star	Lubbock Christian	27–5 (17–3)	8th	2025
South Central (6)	Lone Star	St. Edward's	24–8 (13–7)	7th	2025
South Central (6)	Lone Star	St. Mary's (TX)	21–9 (13–7)	11th	2025
South Central (6)	Lone Star	Western New Mexico	22–7 (15–5)	1st	Never
Southeast (5)	South Atlantic	Catawba	23–8 (16–6)	15th	2025
Southeast (5)	Peach Belt	Columbus State	22–8 (15–5)	16th	2025
Southeast (5)	South Atlantic	Lenoir–Rhyne	24–8 (17–5)	10th	2025
Southeast (5)	South Atlantic	Lincoln Memorial	19–11 (14–8)	15th	2025
Southeast (5)	Peach Belt	North Georgia	21–6 (14–6)	3rd	2024
West (5)	Great Northwest	Alaska Anchorage	21–10 (12–6)	17th	2024
West (5)	CCAA	Cal Poly Humboldt	17–14 (13–9)	15th	2016
West (5)	CCAA	Cal State Dominguez Hills	21–8 (17–5)	8th	2025
West (5)	Pacific West	Hawaii Pacific	18–11 (13–9)	3rd	2017
West (5)	Great Northwest	Northwest Nazarene	18–10 (12–6)	4th	2025

== Bracket ==
Regional play will take place on March 14-15 and 17, except for the West Region, who will play one day earlier for all rounds.

=== Atlantic regional ===
- Site: Erie, Pennsylvania (Gannon)

First round March 14
1	Gannon	83
8	Charleston (WV)	58
5	Fayetteville State	83
4	California (PA)	96
3	Fairmont State	83
6	Indiana (PA)	89
7	Virginia Union	52
2	West Liberty	46

Regional semifinals March 15
1	Gannon	89
4	California (PA)	73
6	Indiana (PA)	66*
7	Virginia Union	62

Regional Finals; March 17
1	Gannon	81
6	Indiana (PA)	74

* – Denotes overtime period

=== Central regional ===
- Site: Topeka, Kansas (Washburn)

First round March 14
1	Washburn	62
8	Minnesota–Duluth	64
5	Missouri Western	65
4	St. Cloud State	83
3	Central Missouri	88
6	Rogers State	77
7	Harding	68
2	Oklahoma Baptist	77

Regional semifinals March 15
8	Minnesota–Duluth	60
4	St. Cloud State	55
3	Central Missouri	63
2	Oklahoma Baptist	75

Regional Finals; March 17
8	Minnesota–Duluth	76
2	Oklahoma Baptist	80

=== East regional ===
- Site: Amherst, New York (Daemen)

First round March 14
1	Daemen	111
8	Goldey–Beacom	78
5	Saint Michael's	87
4	Bentley	80
3	Saint Anselm	92
6	Assumption	81
7	Adelphi	53
2	Felician	75

Regional semifinals March 15
1	Daemen	85
5	Saint Michael's	62
3	Saint Anselm	99
2	Felician	77

Regional Finals; March 17
1	Daemen	94
3	Saint Anselm	73

=== Midwest regional ===
- Site: North Canton, Ohio (Walsh)

First round March 14
1	Walsh	77
8	William Jewell	70
5	Northern Michigan	86
4	Rockhurst	85
3	Michigan Tech	83
6	Lake Erie	73
7	Ashland	45
2	Grand Valley State	59

Regional semifinals March 15
1	Walsh	86
5	Northern Michigan	68
3	Michigan Tech	69
2	Grand Valley State	67

Regional Finals; March 17
1	Walsh	70
3	Michigan Tech	87

=== South regional ===
- Site: Davie, Florida (Nova Southeastern)

First round March 14
1	Nova Southeastern	94
8	Morehouse	60
5	Montevallo	88
4	Florida Southern	81
3	West Alabama	58
6	West Florida	53
7	Alabama–Huntsville	92
2	Palm Beach Atlantic	73

Regional semifinals March 15
1	Nova Southeastern	98
5	Montevallo	85
3	West Alabama	74
7	Alabama–Huntsville	83

Regional Finals; March 17
1	Nova Southeastern	79
7	Alabama–Huntsville	63

=== South Central regional ===
- Site: Dallas, Texas (Dallas Baptist)

First round March 14
1	Dallas Baptist	99
8	Colorado Mesa	66
5	St. Edward's	83
4	Western New Mexico	71
3	Lubbock Christian	64
6	Black Hills State	67
7	St. Mary's (TX)	73
2	Eastern New Mexico	70

Regional semifinals March 15
1	Dallas Baptist	70
5	St. Edward's	56
6	Black Hills State	78
7	St. Mary's (TX)	60

Regional Finals; March 17
1	Dallas Baptist	62
6	Black Hills State	76

=== Southeast regional ===
- Site: Anderson, South Carolina (Anderson (SC))

First round March 14
1	Anderson (SC)	69
8	Young Harris	72
5	North Georgia	67
4	Lenoir–Rhyne	80
3	Catawba	75
6	Columbus State	78
7	Lincoln Memorial	71
2	Lander	76

Regional semifinals March 15
8	Young Harris	78
4	Lenoir–Rhyne	84
6	Columbus State	66
2	Lander	74

Regional Finals; March 17
4	Lenoir–Rhyne	62
2	Lander	86

=== West regional ===
- Site: Hayward, California (Cal State East Bay)

First round March 13
1	Cal State East Bay	83
8	Cal Poly Humboldt	64
5	Cal State Dominguez Hills	69
4	Alaska Anchorage	58
3	Point Loma	76
6	Northwest Nazarene	61
7	Hawaii Pacific	68
2	Saint Martin's	75

Regional semifinals March 14
1	Cal State East Bay	76
5	Cal State Dominguez Hills	67
3	Point Loma	66
2	Saint Martin's	57

Regional Finals; March 16
1	Cal State East Bay	73
3	Point Loma	58

=== Elite Eight ===
- Sites: UPMC Cooper Fieldhouse, Pittsburgh, Pennsylvania (Elite Eight and Final Four, hosted by PennWest Clarion) and Gainbridge Fieldhouse, Indianapolis, Indiana (National championship)

Elite Eight; March 25, 2026; ESPN+
1	Nova Southeastern	76
8	Black Hills State	66
5	Lander	77
4	Daemen	74
3	Gannon	75
6	Michigan Tech	49
7	Oklahoma Baptist	78
2	Cal State East Bay	55

Final Four; March 27, 2026; ESPN+
1	Nova Southeastern	81
5	Lander	91
3	Gannon	98
7	Oklahoma Baptist	80

National championship April 5, 2026; CBS/Paramount+
5	Lander	61
3	Gannon	84

== See also ==
- 2026 NCAA Division I men's basketball tournament
- 2026 NCAA Division III men's basketball tournament
- 2026 NAIA men's basketball tournament
- 2026 NCAA Division II women's basketball tournament
