= 2025 NCAA Division II men's basketball tournament =

Upcoming single-elimination tournament

- Teams: 64
- Finals site: Ford Center, Evansville, Indiana
- Champions: Nova Southeastern (2nd title)
- Runner-up: Cal State Dominguez Hills (1st title game)
- Semifinalists: Dallas Baptist (1st Final Four); Washburn (3rd Final Four)
- Winning coach: Jim Crutchfield (2nd title)
- MOP: MJ Iraldi (Nova Southeastern)

The 2025 NCAA Division II men's basketball tournament is a single-elimination tournament to determine the national champion of men's NCAA Division II college basketball in the United States, the culmination of the 2024–25 NCAA Division II men's basketball season.

The tournament again features 64 teams, with teams placed into one of eight geographically oriented, eight-team regionals. The first three rounds are played on campus sites, while the national quarterfinal (Elite Eight), semifinal, and championship rounds were held at the Ford Center in Evansville, Indiana, from March 25 to 29, 2025.

Concordia–St. Paul and Minot State participated in the tournament for the first time.

== Tournament schedule and venues ==
2024 NCAA Division II Men's sites – regionals (cyan) Elite Eight (red)

=== Regionals ===
First, second, and third-round games (the last of which serve as a regional championship), took place on campus sites from March 15 to 18, 2025. The top-seeded team in each regional served as host.

=== Elite Eight ===
The national quarterfinals quarterfinals, semifinals, and finals are being held at a predetermined site, the Ford Center in Evansville, Indiana, from March 25 to 29, 2025.

== Qualifying ==
A total of 64 bids were available for the tournament: 23 automatic bids (awarded to the champions of the twenty-three Division II conferences) and 41 at-large bids.

The bids are allocated evenly among the eight NCAA-designated regions (Atlantic, Central, East, Midwest, South, South Central, Southeast, and West), each of which contains either two or three of the 23 Division II conferences that sponsor men's basketball. Each region consists of two or three automatic qualifiers (the teams that won their respective conference tournaments) and either five or six at-large bids, awarded regardless of conference affiliation.

=== Automatic bids (23) ===
Automatic bids
Region (Bids)	Conference	School	Record (Conf.)	Appearance	Last bid
Atlantic (3)	CIAA	Virginia State	21–8 (13–3)	7th	2020
Atlantic (3)	Mountain East	Fairmont State	27–4 (17–3)	15th	2023
Atlantic (3)	PSAC	Gannon	25–6 (17–3)	27th	2024
Central (3)	Great American	Harding	22–9 (15–7)	7th	2016
Central (3)	MIAA	Fort Hays State	22–9 (12–7)	15th	2024
Central (3)	Northern Sun	Minnesota State–Moorhead	23–8 (15–7)	10th	2024
East (3)	CACC	Bridgeport	19–12 (10–6)	24th	2020
East (3)	East Coast	Daemen	27–0 (16–0)	5th	2024
East (3)	Northeast–10	Southern New Hampshire	21–8 (14–6)	23rd	2024
Midwest (3)	GLIAC	Northern Michigan	22–9 (13–7)	11th	2024
Midwest (3)	GLVC	Lincoln (MO)	23–8 (12–8)	13th	1981
Midwest (3)	Great Midwest	Malone	16–15 (9–11)	2nd	2021
South (3)	Gulf South	Alabama–Huntsville	30–1 (22–0)	17th	2024
South (3)	SIAC	Savannah State	18–11 (12–9)	2nd	2022
South (3)	Sunshine State	Nova Southeastern	30–1 (19–1)	6th	2024
South Central (2)	Lone Star	Dallas Baptist	30–4 (19–3)	9th	2024
South Central (2)	RMAC	Colorado Mines	27–4 (18–2)	14th	2024
Southeast (3)	Carolinas	UNC Pembroke	23–6 (18–2)	11th	2024
Southeast (3)	Peach Belt	USC Aiken	23–8 (13–5)	11th	2024
Southeast (3)	South Atlantic	Lenoir–Rhyne	26–5 (20–4)	9th	2019
West (3)	CCAA	Cal State Dominguez Hills	25–5 (20–2)	7th	2024
West (3)	Great Northwest	Seattle Pacific	18–14 (11–7)	29th	2020
West (3)	PacWest	Point Loma	27–5 (18–2)	7th	2023

=== At-large bids (41) ===
At-large bids
Region (Bids)	School	Conference	Record (Conf.)	Appearance	Last bid
Atlantic (5)	Bluefield State	CIAA	19–11 (10–6)	2nd	1996
Atlantic (5)	East Stroudsburg	PSAC	21–8 (15–6)	9th	2023
Atlantic (5)	Fayetteville State	CIAA	22–8 (12–4)	4th	2022
Atlantic (5)	West Chester	PSAC	23–6 (18–3)	10th	2019
Atlantic (5)	West Liberty	Mountain East	27–4 (18–2)	17th	2024
Central (5)	Concordia–St. Paul	Northern Sun	21–8 (16–6)	1st	Never
Central (5)	Minot State	Northern Sun	26–9 (14–8)	1st	Never
Central (5)	Southwest Minnesota State	Northern Sun	21–8 (16–6)	7th	2024
Central (5)	Washburn	MIAA	26–3 (17–2)	17th	2022
Central (5)	Winona State	Northern Sun	21–10 (14–8)	11th	2014
East (5)	Adelphi	Northeast–10	26–7 (17–3)	18th	2012
East (5)	Assumption	Northeast–10	19–9 (14–6)	28th	2013
East (5)	Dominican (NY)	CACC	20–8 (14–2)	7th	2023
East (5)	Pace	Northeast–10	24–7 (14–6)	7th	2023
East (5)	St. Thomas Aquinas	East Coast	23–9 (13–3)	10th	2024
Midwest (5)	Ferris State	GLIAC	25–8 (14–6)	18th	2024
Midwest (5)	Lake Superior State	GLIAC	27–6 (16–4)	7th	2024
Midwest (5)	Michigan Tech	GLIAC	23–7 (17–3)	12th	2021
Midwest (5)	Missouri S&T	GLVC	24–5 (17–3)	4th	1996
Midwest (5)	Missouri–St. Louis	GLVC	19–11 (15–5)	6th	2023
South (5)	Florida Southern	Sunshine State	25–8 (14–6)	34th	2024
South (5)	Lynn	Sunshine State	20–8 (14–6)	7th	2019
South (5)	Montevallo	Gulf South	20–10 (15–7)	12th	2016
South (5)	Tampa	Sunshine State	20–10 (11–9)	17th	2014
South (5)	Valdosta State	Gulf South	25–6 (18–4)	14th	2021
South Central (6)	Lubbock Christian	Lone Star	25–8 (18–4)	7th	2024
South Central (6)	Midwestern State	Lone Star	22–7 (17–5)	12th	2016
South Central (6)	Regis (CO)	RMAC	18–13 (14–6)	6th	2018
South Central (6)	St. Edward's	Lone Star	21–12 (14–8)	6th	2020
South Central (6)	St. Mary's (TX)	Lone Star	19–10 (16–6)	10th	2015
South Central (6)	West Texas A&M	Lone Star	19–11 (13–9)	22nd	2024
Southeast (5)	Augusta	Peach Belt	19–10 (13–5)	16th	2023
Southeast (5)	Carson–Newman	South Atlantic	21–11 (15–9)	6th	2021
Southeast (5)	Catawba	South Atlantic	18–12 (14–10)	14th	2024
Southeast (5)	Columbus State	Peach Belt	26–4 (16–2)	15th	2022
Southeast (5)	Lincoln Memorial	South Atlantic	25–5 (21–3)	14th	2024
West (5)	Biola	PacWest	22–7 (16–4)	2nd	2021
West (5)	Cal State San Bernardino	CCAA	22–11 (14–8)	18th	2024
West (5)	Central Washington	Great Northwest	21–9 (14–4)	10th	2024
West (5)	Chico State	CCAA	24–6 (19–3)	18th	2024
West (5)	Northwest Nazarene	Great Northwest	20–7 (13–5)	3rd	2023

== Bracket ==
=== Atlantic regional ===
- Site: West Liberty, West Virginia (West Liberty)

First round March 15
1	West Liberty	91
8	Bluefield State	84
5	Fairmont State	67
4	Fayetteville State	74*
3	Virginia State	80
6	West Chester	64
7	East Stroudsburg	74
2	Gannon	99

Regional semifinals March 16
1	West Liberty	89
4	Fayetteville State	69
3	Virginia State	66
2	Gannon	92

Regional Finals; March 18
1	West Liberty	101
2	Gannon	90

* – Denotes overtime period

=== Central regional ===
- Site: Topeka, Kansas (Washburn)

First round March 15
1	Washburn	85
8	Harding	57
5	Concordia–St. Paul	83
4	Minot State	71
3	Winona State	69
6	Southwest Minnesota State	62
7	Fort Hays State	62
2	Minnesota State–Moorhead	69

Regional semifinals March 16
1	Washburn	94
5	Concordia–St. Paul	78
3	Winona State	59
2	Minnesota State–Moorhead	70

Regional Finals; March 18
1	Washburn	93
2	Minnesota State–Moorhead	65

=== East regional ===
- Site: Amherst, New York (Daemen)

First round March 15
1	Daemen	80
8	Bridgeport	68
5	St. Thomas Aquinas	79
4	Pace	72
3	Southern New Hampshire	66
6	Assumption	92
7	Dominican (NY)	85
2	Adelphi	66

Regional semifinals March 16
1	Daemen	74
5	St. Thomas Aquinas	79
6	Assumption	81
7	Dominican (NY)	75

Regional Finals; March 18
5	St. Thomas Aquinas	90
6	Assumption	97

=== Midwest regional ===
- Site: Springfield, Illinois (Missouri S&T)

First round March 15
1	Missouri S&T	85*
8	Malone	77
5	Ferris State	79
4	Missouri–St. Louis	81
3	Michigan Tech	87
6	Northern Michigan	72
7	Lincoln (MO)	64
2	Lake Superior State	76

Regional semifinals March 16
1	Missouri S&T	56
4	Missouri–St. Louis	65
3	Michigan Tech	73
2	Lake Superior State	83

Regional Finals; March 18
4	Missouri–St. Louis	62
2	Lake Superior State	75

* – Denotes overtime period

=== South regional ===
- Site: Davie, Florida (Nova Southeastern)

First round March 15
1	Nova Southeastern	76
8	Savannah State	64
5	Lynn	86
4	Valdosta State	74
3	Florida Southern	86
6	Montevallo	83
7	Tampa	88
2	Alabama–Huntsville	99

Regional semifinals March 16
1	Nova Southeastern	80
5	Lynn	72
3	Florida Southern	86
2	Alabama–Huntsville	97

Regional Finals; March 18
1	Nova Southeastern	76
2	Alabama–Huntsville	69

=== South Central regional ===
- Site: Dallas, Texas (Dallas Baptist)

First round March 15
1	Dallas Baptist	74
8	Regis (CO)	54
5	St. Edward's	72
4	Midwestern State	102
3	Lubbock Christian	61
6	St. Mary's (TX)	67
7	West Texas A&M	62
2	Colorado Mines	74

Regional semifinals March 16
1	Dallas Baptist	80
4	Midwestern State	54
6	St. Mary's (TX)	63
2	Colorado Mines	66

Regional Finals; March 18
1	Dallas Baptist	100
2	Colorado Mines	79

=== Southeast regional ===
- Site: Columbus, Georgia (Columbus State)

First round March 15
1	Columbus State	75
8	Carson–Newman	74
5	UNC Pembroke	90
4	Lincoln Memorial	88
3	Lenoir–Rhyne	94
6	Augusta	79
7	Catawba	71
2	USC Aiken	80

Regional semifinals March 16
1	Columbus State	80
5	UNC Pembroke	91
3	Lenoir–Rhyne	91
2	USC Aiken	87

Regional Finals; March 18
5	UNC Pembroke	74
3	Lenoir–Rhyne	76*

* – Denotes overtime period

=== West regional ===
- Site: San Diego, California (Point Loma)

First round March 14
1	Point Loma	68
8	Seattle Pacific	54
5	Cal State San Bernardino	88
4	Biola	77
3	Chico State	79
6	Central Washington	82*
7	Northwest Nazarene	59
2	Cal State Dominguez Hills	66

Regional semifinals March 15
1	Point Loma	82
5	Cal State San Bernardino	64
6	Central Washington	65
2	Cal State Dominguez Hills	77

Regional Finals; March 17
1	Point Loma	58
2	Cal State Dominguez Hills	61

* – Denotes overtime period

=== Elite Eight ===
- Site: Ford Center, Evansville, Indiana

Elite Eight; March 25, 2025; ESPN+
1	Nova Southeastern	102
8	Assumption	93
5	Lenoir-Rhyne	78
4	Washburn	90
3	Dallas Baptist	98
6	Lake Superior State	85
7	Cal State Dominguez Hills	86
2	West Liberty	84

Final Four; March 27, 2025; ESPN+
1	Nova Southeastern	94
4	Washburn	68
3	Dallas Baptist	83
7	Cal State Dominguez Hills	94*

National championship March 29, 2025; CBS/Paramount+
1	Nova Southeastern	74
7	Cal State Dominguez Hills	73

* – Denotes overtime period

== See also ==
- 2025 NCAA Division I men's basketball tournament
- 2025 NCAA Division III men's basketball tournament
- 2025 NAIA men's basketball tournament
- 2025 NCAA Division II women's basketball tournament
