= Jim Crutchfield =

American basketball coach

Current position
- Title: Head coach
- Team: Nova Southeastern
- Conference: Sunshine State
- Record: 237–28 (.894)

Biographical details
- Born: c. 1955 or 1956 (age 70–71)
- Education: West Virginia ('78)

Coaching career (HC unless noted)

Basketball
- 1979–1989: Cameron HS
- 1989–2004: West Liberty (assistant)
- 2004–2017: West Liberty
- 2017–present: Nova Southeastern

Tennis
- 1989–2004: West Liberty

Head coaching record
- Overall: 596–89 (.870)

Accomplishments and honors

Championships
- 2 NCAA Division II tournament (2023, 2025); 6 SSC regular season (2019, 2022–2026); 5 SSC tournament (2022–2026); 3 MEC regular season (2014–2016); MEC tournament (2017); 4 WVIAC regular season (2010–2013); 3 WVIAC tournament (2011–2013)

Awards
- 2× NABC Division II Coach of the Year (2023, 2025); Clarence Gaines Award (2023); 5× WVIAC Coach of the Year (2005, 2010–2013); MEC Coach of the Year (2014); 5× SSC Coach of the Year (2019, 2022, 2023, 2025, 2026)

Jim Crutchfield is an American college basketball coach who is the head coach of the Nova Southeastern Sharks men's basketball team.

== Early life ==
Crutchfield grew up in Clarksburg, West Virginia and attended Roosevelt-Wilson High School, where he played basketball. He graduated from West Virginia University in 1978.

== Coaching career ==
Crutchfield had originally planned to attend West Virginia University College of Law after spending a year trying to find a high school coaching position. He disenrolled shortly before the start of classes after being hired as the head basketball coach at Cameron High School. Crutchfield coached at Cameron for ten years and also taught mathematics.

Crutchfield was originally hired as the head men's and women's tennis coach and as an assistant men's basketball coach for the West Liberty Hilltoppers in 1989. As a tennis coach, he won a combined 11 West Virginia Intercollegiate Athletic Conference (WVIAC) titles and was named the WVIAC Coach of the Year eight times. He was hired as the head men's basketball coach at West Liberty in 2004. In 13 seasons as head coach, the Hilltoppers went 359–61 with six Elite Eight appearances and four Final Four appearances.

Crutchfield was hired as the head coach at Nova Southeastern on March 21, 2017. During the 2022–23 season, he coached the Sharks to a 36–0 record as the team won the 2023 NCAA Division II men's basketball tournament. The following season, Nova Southeastern went 32–3 and returned to the national championship game where they lost to Minnesota State 88–85. During the 2024–25 season, Crutchfield coached the Sharks to a 36–1 record and a third straight national championship game appearance. They would win their second national championship in three years after defeating Cal State Dominguez Hills 74–73.

== Head coaching record ==
Record table
Season	Team	Overall	Conference	Standing	Postseason
West Liberty Hilltoppers (West Virginia Intercollegiate Athletic Conference) (2004–2013)
2004–05	West Liberty	21–10	13–6		
2005–06	West Liberty	21–8	11–7		
2006–07	West Liberty	25–5	17–1		NCAA Division II First Round
2007–08	West Liberty	23–6	14–5		
2008–09	West Liberty	23–7	16–4		
2009–10	West Liberty	29–3	21–1		NCAA Division II Sweet 16
2010–11	West Liberty	33–1	22–0		NCAA Division II Final Four
2011–12	West Liberty	32–3	21–1		NCAA Division II Elite Eight
2012–13	West Liberty	34–2	21–1		NCAA Division II Final Four
West Liberty Hilltoppers (Mountain East Conference) (2013–2017)
2013–14	West Liberty	31–4	20–2		NCAA Division II Runner-Up
2014–15	West Liberty	28–4	21–2		NCAA Division II Sweet 16
2015–16	West Liberty	31–4	20–2		NCAA Division II Final Four
2016–17	West Liberty	28–4	19–3		NCAA Division II First Round
West Liberty:		359–61 (.855)	236–35 (.871)		
Nova Southeastern (Sunshine State Conference) (2017–present)
2017–18	Nova Southeastern	17–10	11–9	T–4th	
2018–19	Nova Southeastern	29–4	18–2	1st	NCAA Division II Elite Eight
2019–20	Nova Southeastern	23–6	15–5	2nd	No postseason held
2020–21	Nova Southeastern (Note: Nova Southeastern did not play in the 2020–21 school year due to COVID-19 concerns.)				
2021–22	Nova Southeastern	31–1	20–0	1st	NCAA Division II Elite Eight
2022–23	Nova Southeastern	36–0	20–0	1st	NCAA Division II Champion
2023–24	Nova Southeastern	32–3	18–2	1st	NCAA Division II Runner-Up
2024–25	Nova Southeastern	36–1	19–1	1st	NCAA Division II Champion
2025–26	Nova Southeastern	31–2	19–1	1st	NCAA Division II Final Four
2026–27	Nova Southeastern	2–1	0–0		
Nova Southeastern:		237–28 (.894)	142–20 (.877)		
Total:		596–89 (.870)			
National champion Postseason invitational champion Conference regular season champion Conference regular season and conference tournament champion Division regular season champion Division regular season and conference tournament champion Conference tournament champion
