= RJ Sunahara =

American basketball player (born 2000)

Nova Southeastern Sharks
- Title: Assistant coach
- League: Sunshine State Conference

Personal information
- Born: May 23, 2000 (age 26)
- Listed height: 6 ft 8 in (2.03 m)
- Listed weight: 210 lb (95 kg)

Career information
- High school: Bay (Bay Village, Ohio)
- College: Nova Southeastern (2019–2023); Georgia (2023–2024)
- NBA draft: 2024: undrafted
- Position: Guard
- Coaching career: 2024–present

Career history

Coaching
- 2024–present: Nova Southeastern (assistant)

Career highlights
- NCAA Division II champion (2023); NCAA Division II Final Four co-MOP (2023); NABC Division II Player of the Year (2023); Bevo Francis Award (2023); First-team Division II All-American (2023); SSC Player of the Year (2023); 2× First-team All-SSC (2022, 2023); SSC Freshman of the Year (2020); SSC tournament MVP (2022)

Reed "RJ" Sunahara Jr. (born May 23, 2000) is an American college basketball coach for Iona University Gaels in New Rochelle, NY. Previously RJ coached at D2 powerhouse Nova Southeastern Sharks of the Sunshine State Conference. He played for the Georgia Bulldogs and Nova Southeastern.

== High school career ==
Sunahara played for Bay High School in Bay Village, Ohio and was recruited to play for coach Joe Mazzulla at Fairmont State University. He redshirted the 2018–19 season and then decided to transfer after Mazzulla left to join the staff of the NBA's Boston Celtics, ultimately landing at Nova Southeastern (NSU).

== College career ==
=== Nova Southeastern ===
At NSU, Sunahara became a key part of teams that compiled a two-year record of 67–1. As a redshirt sophomore in 2021–22, Sunahara averaged 19.3 points and 6.7 rebounds per game. The Sharks carried an undefeated record and number 1 ranking into the NCAA Division II Elite Eight, but were upset by Black Hills State, foiling their championship bid. The following season, Sunahara and the Sharks used the loss to motivate them throughout the year. Sunahara averaged 18.9 points and 5.4 rebounds per game and led the Sharks to an undefeated championship season, scoring 28 points, grabbing 9 rebounds in the championship game and earning tournament co-Most Outstanding Player honors with his teammate Will Yoakum. At the close of the season, Sunahara earned top individual honors for Division II players, including NABC Division II Player of the Year, first-team All-American and the Bevo Francis Award for the top player in all divisions below Division I.

=== Georgia ===
On May 11, 2023, Sunahara announced his decision to transfer to play for the Georgia Bulldogs.

== Coaching career ==
Following the end of his playing career, Sunahara returned to NSU as an assistant coach on Jim Crutchfield's staff. After 2 years on the sideline at Nova, RJ joined the coaching staff at Iona as the Director of Player Development in the summer of 2026.

== Personal life ==
Coming from an athletic family, Sunahara is the son of West Virginia head volleyball coach Reed Sunahara. His older brother Rex is a professional football player, currently a long snapper with the Cleveland Browns, while his uncle Chet Moeller played football at Navy and is a member of the College Football Hall of Fame. He is of Japanese descent through his father, who was from Hawaii.
