= Easton Bazzoli =

American basketball coach

Current position
- Title: Head coach
- Team: Gannon
- Conference: PSAC

Biographical details
- Born: May 23, 1995 (age 31); Pittsburgh, Pennsylvania, U.S.

Playing career
- 2013–2017: Cedarville

Coaching career (HC unless noted)
- 2017–2018: Union (TN) (graduate assistant)
- 2018–2023: Union (TN) (assistant)
- 2023–2024: Gannon (assistant)
- 2024–present: Gannon

Head coaching record
- Overall: 66–10 (.868)
- Tournaments: 8–1 (NCAA Division II)

Accomplishments and honors

Championships
- NCAA Division II tournament (2026); 2 PSAC West (2025, 2026); PSAC tournament (2025)

Awards
- PSAC West Coach of the Year (2026)

Easton Bazzoli is an American college basketball coach who is the head coach of the Gannon Golden Knights men's basketball team.

== Early life and playing career ==
Bazzoli grew up in Cranberry Township, Butler County, Pennsylvania and attended Seneca Valley Senior High School. He averaged 15.5 points and 4.0 assists as a senior and was named the Butler County Player of the Year. Bazzoli played college basketball at Cedarville University. He averaged 10.8 points during his senior season with the Yellow Jackets.

== Coaching career ==
Bazzoli began his coaching career as a graduate assistant at Union University in 2017. He was promoted to an assistant coaching position in 2018.

Bazzoli was hired as an assistant coach at Gannon in 2024 by Jordan Fee. He was hired as the head coach at Gannon on April 2, 2024, after Fee resigned to take an assistant coaching position at Florida Atlantic. The Golden Knights went 27–7 in Bazzoli's first season as head coach as the team won the Pennsylvania State Athletic Conference (PSAC) West division and the PSAC tournament. In his second season as head coach, Bazzoli coached Gannon to its first Division II national championship as the Golden Knights defeated Lander 84–61 in the 2026 NCAA Division II title game.

== Head coaching record ==
Record table
Season	Team	Overall	Conference	Standing	Postseason
Gannon (Pennsylvania State Athletic Conference) (2024–present)
2024–25	Gannon	27–7	17–3	1st (West)	NCAA Division II Sweet 16
2025–26	Gannon	34–3	19–1	1st (West)	NCAA Division II Champion
2026–27	Gannon	5–0	0–0		
Gannon:		66–10 (.868)	36–4 (.900)		
Total:		66–10 (.868)			
National champion Postseason invitational champion Conference regular season champion Conference regular season and conference tournament champion Division regular season champion Division regular season and conference tournament champion Conference tournament champion
