= 2024 NCAA Division II men's basketball tournament =

- Teams: 64
- Finals site: Ford Center, Evansville, Indiana
- Champions: Minnesota State Mavericks (1st title)
- Runner-up: Nova Southeastern Sharks (2nd title game)
- Semifinalists: Cal State San Bernardino Coyotes (3rd Final Four); West Texas A&M Buffaloes (3rd Final Four)
- Winning coach: Matt Margenthaler (1st title)
- MOP: Malik Willingham (Minnesota State)

The 2024 NCAA Division II men's basketball tournament was a single-elimination tournament to determine the national champion of men's NCAA Division II college basketball in the United States, the culmination of the 2023–24 NCAA Division II men's basketball season.

The tournament again featured 64 teams, with teams placed into one of eight geographically oriented, eight-team regionals. The first three rounds were played on campus sites while the national quarterfinal (Elite Eight), semifinal, and championship rounds were held at the Ford Center in Evansville, Indiana, from March 26 to 30, 2024.

Minnesota State topped defending champions Nova Southeastern 88–85 in the championship game, on a three-pointer by Kyreese Willingham with 0.8 seconds left to win their first national championship. In the process, the Mavericks also completed a sweep of both the men's and women's Division II basketball championships for 2024, something that had only previously been done by Central Missouri in 1984. The Maverick women won their national championship, defeating Texas Woman's, 89–73.

Lincoln (PA), Post, and William Jewell participated in the tournament for the first time.

== Tournament schedule and venues ==
2024 NCAA Division II Men's sites – regionals (cyan) Elite Eight (red)

=== Regionals ===
First, second, and third-round games (the last of which serve as a regional championship), took place on campus sites from March 15 to 19, 2024. The top-seeded team in each regional served as host.

=== Elite Eight ===
The national quarterfinals quarterfinals, semifinals, and finals are being held at a predetermined site, the Ford Center in Evansville, Indiana, from March 26 to 30, 2024.

== Qualifying ==
A total of 64 bids were available for the tournament: 23 automatic bids (awarded to the champions of the twenty-three Division II conferences) and 41 at-large bids.

The bids are allocated evenly among the eight NCAA-designated regions (Atlantic, Central, East, Midwest, South, South Central, Southeast, and West), each of which contains either two or three of the 23 Division II conferences that sponsor men's basketball. Each region consists of two or three automatic qualifiers (the teams that won their respective conference tournaments) and either five or six at-large bids, awarded regardless of conference affiliation.

=== Automatic bids (23) ===
Automatic bids
Region (Bids)	Conference	School	Record (Conf.)	Appearance	Last bid
Atlantic (3)	CIAA	Lincoln (PA)	17–13 (10–7)	1st	Never
Atlantic (3)	Mountain East	Charleston (WV)	27–4 (17–3)	9th	2021
Atlantic (3)	PSAC	Gannon	29–2 (20–2)	26th	2018
Central (3)	Great American	Arkansas Tech	25–6 (18–4)	9th	2017
Central (3)	MIAA	Northwest Missouri State	27–4 (20–2)	24th	2023
Central (3)	Northern Sun	Minnesota State	29–2 (20–2)	16th	2019
East (3)	CACC	Jefferson	23–8 (12–4)	38th	2020
East (3)	East Coast	St. Thomas Aquinas	25–5 (14–2)	9th	2023
East (3)	Northeast–10	Southern New Hampshire	21–10 (13–9)	22nd	2023
Midwest (3)	GLIAC	Ferris State	25–7 (12–6)	17th	2023
Midwest (3)	GLVC	William Jewell	21–10 (12–8)	1st	Never
Midwest (3)	Great Midwest	Walsh	24–5 (15–5)	4th	2022
South (3)	Gulf South	West Georgia	26–5 (19–5)	19th	2023
South (3)	SIAC	Clark Atlanta	25–5 (16–5)	6th	2018
South (3)	Sunshine State	Nova Southeastern	27–2 (18–2)	5th	2023
South Central (2)	Lone Star	Eastern New Mexico	22–9 (15–7)	3rd	2004
South Central (2)	RMAC	Fort Lewis	28–3 (20–2)	13th	2023
Southeast (3)	Carolinas	UNC Pembroke	23–6 (15–3)	10th	2023
Southeast (3)	Peach Belt	North Georgia	25–6 (13–5)	2nd	2023
Southeast (3)	South Atlantic	Catawba	22–5 (16–4)	13th	2023
West (3)	CCAA	Cal State Los Angeles	24–7 (16–6)	6th	2000
West (3)	Great Northwest	Central Washington	21–9 (11–7)	9th	2011
West (3)	PacWest	Azusa Pacific	14–16 (10–10)	7th	2023

=== At-large bids (41) ===
At-large bids
Region (Bids)	School	Conference	Record (Conf.)	Appearance	Last bid
Atlantic (5)	California (PA)	PSAC	27–4 (19–3)	15th	2022
Atlantic (5)	Concord	Mountain East	22–7 (14–6)	3rd	2016
Atlantic (5)	Millersville	PSAC	24–6 (18–4)	12th	2022
Atlantic (5)	West Liberty	Mountain East	25–6 (17–3)	16th	2023
Atlantic (5)	West Virginia State	Mountain East	20–9 (14–6)	7th	2022
Central (5)	Fort Hays State	MIAA	23–7 (17–5)	14th	2016
Central (5)	Minnesota State–Moorhead	Northern Sun	24–5 (18–4)	9th	2023
Central (5)	Minnesota–Duluth	Northern Sun	25–6 (18–4)	8th	2023
Central (5)	Pittsburg State	MIAA	21–10 (15–7)	7th	2015
Central (5)	Southwest Minnesota State	Northern Sun	19–12 (14–8)	6th	2018
East (5)	Bloomfield	CACC	22–9 (11–5)	10th	2021
East (5)	Daemen	East Coast	24–8 (12–4)	4th	2021
East (5)	Post	CACC	20–9 (10–6)	1st	Never
East (5)	Saint Michael's	Northeast–10	22–8 (17–5)	13th	2001
East (5)	Southern Connecticut State	Northeast–10	22–10 (13–9)	9th	2017
Midwest (5)	Indianapolis	GLVC	22–8 (17–3)	14th	2023
Midwest (5)	Kentucky Wesleyan	Great Midwest	21–8 (15–5)	39th	2017
Midwest (5)	Lake Superior State	GLIAC	21–8 (13–5)	6th	2018
Midwest (5)	Northern Michigan	GLIAC	22–10 (14–4)	10th	2023
Midwest (5)	Upper Iowa	GLVC	21–9 (15–5)	4th	2022
South (5)	Alabama–Huntsville	Gulf South	21–10 (17–7)	16th	2023
South (5)	Benedict	SIAC	23–7 (15–6)	11th	2015
South (5)	Embry–Riddle (FL)	Sunshine State	21–9 (14–6)	4th	2023
South (5)	Florida Southern	Sunshine State	21–9 (15–5)	33rd	2020
South (5)	Lee	Gulf South	21–8 (17–7)	4th	2023
South Central (6)	Angelo State	Lone Star	19–10 (14–8)	11th	2023
South Central (6)	Colorado Mesa	RMAC	27–4 (21–1)	11th	2023
South Central (6)	Colorado Mines	RMAC	24–8 (17–5)	13th	2023
South Central (6)	Dallas Baptist	Lone Star	24–5 (18–4)	8th	2022
South Central (6)	Lubbock Christian	Lone Star	23–10 (16–6)	6th	2023
South Central (6)	West Texas A&M	Lone Star	26–4 (20–2)	21st	2023
Southeast (5)	Emmanuel (GA)	Carolinas	25–6 (16–2)	4th	2023
Southeast (5)	Lander	Peach Belt	20–9 (12–6)	7th	2023
Southeast (5)	Lincoln Memorial	South Atlantic	24–8 (16–4)	13th	2023
Southeast (5)	USC Aiken	Peach Belt	23–6 (14–4)	10th	2023
Southeast (5)	Wingate	South Atlantic	22–8 (16–4)	12th	2017
West (5)	Alaska Anchorage	Great Northwest	22–10 (10–8)	16th	2012
West (5)	Cal State Dominguez Hills	CCAA	22–7 (17–5)	6th	2011
West (5)	Cal State San Bernardino	CCAA	23–7 (17–5)	17th	2023
West (5)	Chico State	CCAA	20–8 (15–7)	17th	2022
West (5)	Montana State Billings	Great Northwest	20–9 (14–4)	12th	2023

== Bracket ==
=== Atlantic regional ===
- Sites: Erie, Pennsylvania (Gannon) and California, Pennsylvania (California)

First round March 15
1	Gannon	97
8	Lincoln (PA)	63
5	Millersville	78
4	West Liberty	100
3	Charleston (WV)	93
6	Concord	55
7	West Virginia State	80
2	California (PA)	96

Regional semifinals March 16
1	Gannon	103
4	West Liberty	88
3	Charleston (WV)	68
2	California (PA)	67

Regional Finals; March 19
1	Gannon	67
3	Charleston (WV)	65

=== Central regional ===
- Site: Mankato, Minnesota (Minnesota State)

First round March 16
1	Minnesota State	75
8	Arkansas Tech	68
5	Pittsburg State	55
4	Minnesota State–Moorhead	73
3	Minnesota–Duluth	59
6	Fort Hays State	58
7	Southwest Minnesota State	43
2	Northwest Missouri State	73

Regional semifinals March 17
1	Minnesota State	78
4	Minnesota State–Moorhead	55
3	Minnesota–Duluth	62
2	Northwest Missouri State	71

Regional Finals; March 19
1	Minnesota State	43
2	Northwest Missouri State	42

=== East regional ===
- Site: Colchester, Vermont (Saint Michael's)

First round March 16
1	Saint Michael's	68
8	Southern Connecticut State	62
5	Jefferson	66
4	Daemen	74
3	Southern New Hampshire	75
6	Bloomfield	70
7	Post	80
2	St. Thomas Aquinas	72

Regional semifinals March 17
1	Saint Michael's	86
4	Daemen	62
3	Southern New Hampshire	69
7	Post	64

Regional Finals; March 19
1	Saint Michael's	61
3	Southern New Hampshire	73

=== Midwest regional ===
- Site: Indianapolis, Indiana (Indianapolis)

First round March 16
1	Indianapolis	71
8	William Jewell	65
5	Ferris State	81
4	Northern Michigan	65
3	Walsh	72
6	Lake Superior State	74
7	Upper Iowa	82
2	Kentucky Wesleyan	72

Regional semifinals March 17
1	Indianapolis	87
5	Ferris State	94*
6	Lake Superior State	88
7	Upper Iowa	80

Regional Finals; March 19
5	Ferris State	86
6	Lake Superior State	81

* – Denotes overtime period

=== South regional ===
- Site: Davie, Florida (Nova Southeastern)

First round March 16
1	Nova Southeastern	115
8	Benedict	95
5	Embry–Riddle (FL)	104
4	Alabama–Huntsville	78
3	Florida Southern	80
6	Clark Atlanta	72
7	Lee	61
2	West Georgia	75

Regional semifinals March 17
1	Nova Southeastern	81
5	Embry–Riddle (FL)	73
3	Florida Southern	93*
2	West Georgia	87

Regional Finals; March 19
1	Nova Southeastern	98
3	Florida Southern	66

* – Denotes overtime period

=== South Central regional ===
- Site: Canyon, Texas (West Texas A&M)

First round March 16
1	West Texas A&M	81
8	Angelo State	66
5	Colorado Mines	73
4	Dallas Baptist	86
3	Colorado Mesa	95
6	Eastern New Mexico	77
7	Lubbock Christian	72
2	Fort Lewis	86

Regional semifinals March 17
1	West Texas A&M	60
4	Dallas Baptist	54
3	Colorado Mesa	85
2	Fort Lewis	80

Regional Finals; March 19
1	West Texas A&M	88
3	Colorado Mesa	76

=== Southeast regional ===
- Site: Dahlonega, Georgia (North Georgia)

First round March 16
1	North Georgia	89
8	Wingate	80
5	UNC Pembroke	94
4	Catawba	98*
3	Lincoln Memorial	76
6	Lander	85
7	Emmanuel (GA)	70
2	USC Aiken	69

Regional semifinals March 17
1	North Georgia	86
4	Catawba	70
6	Lander	86*
7	Emmanuel (GA)	78

Regional Finals; March 19
1	North Georgia	70
6	Lander	67

* – Denotes overtime period

=== West regional ===
- Site: Los Angeles, California (Cal State Los Angeles)

First round March 15
1	Cal State Los Angeles	59
8	Azusa Pacific	60
5	Central Washington	110
4	Cal State Dominguez Hills	90
3	Montana State Billings	64
6	Chico State	78
7	Alaska Anchorage	49
2	Cal State San Bernardino	52

Regional semifinals March 16
8	Azusa Pacific	82
5	Central Washington	74
6	Chico State	73
2	Cal State San Bernardino	75

Regional Finals; March 18
8	Azusa Pacific	67
2	Cal State San Bernardino	74

=== Elite Eight ===
- Site: Ford Center, Evansville, Indiana

Elite Eight; March 26, 2024
1	Minnesota State	98
8	Ferris State	70
5	North Georgia	76
4	West Texas A&M	90
3	Gannon	65
6	Cal State San Bernardino	99
7	Southern New Hampshire	60
2	Nova Southeastern	68

Final Four; March 28, 2024
1	Minnesota State	79
4	West Texas A&M	72
6	Cal State San Bernardino	77
2	Nova Southeastern	91

National championship March 30, 2024
1	Minnesota State	88
2	Nova Southeastern	85

== See also ==
- 2024 NCAA Division I men's basketball tournament
- 2024 NCAA Division III men's basketball tournament
- 2024 NAIA men's basketball tournament
- 2024 NCAA Division II women's basketball tournament
