= Phil Ross =

American baseball player (1962–2020)

Phil Ross (May 23, 1962 – August 20, 2020) was an American college baseball player. He had one of the greatest single seasons in college baseball history. For the 1985 season he set, tied, or entered the NCAA record books 8 times while playing first base for Saint Leo University (Saint Leo College at the time). Five of the 8 records still stand over 35 years later.

Some of his noteworthy achievements include a .484 batting average, 1.8 RBIs per game (he had 90 in 50 games), and 22 HRs, including 2 Grand Slams in one inning.

== 1985 season statistics ==
BA	Gms	AB	R	H	2B	3B	HR	RBI	TB	SLG%	BB	SO	OBP	OPS
.484	50	186	79	90	17	3	22	90	179	.962	53	15	.645	1.607

In the Division II Sunshine State Conference, in which Saint Leo played, Ross was the first player to win the triple crown (Batting Average, HRs, and RBIs). The Sunshine State Conference has had 14 NCAA Division II College World Series champions since 1968.

Ross' performance in 1985 earned him 1st Team All-Sunshine State Conference, 1st Team All-South, and 1st Team All-American.

Of Ross' 22 HRs, 16 were with men on base, 3 were leadoff solo HRs. He hit 2 HRs in a game 3 times. His slugging percentage was .962; his on-base percentage was .645. He had 53 walks in 50 games. In the 19 games in which he hit his 22 HRs, his batting average was .623 with 67 RBIs (3.5 RBI per game).

He only struck out 15 times in 248 plate appearances (an average of 6 strikeouts per 100 plate appearances). He scored 79 times, 1.58 times per game.

As a first baseman Ross made only 6 errors in 516 total plays for a .988 fielding percentage.

== Two grand slams in one inning ==
On March 18, 1985, in a home game against Division I Florida A&M, Ross went 3–4, including 2 Grand Slams in the second inning, a stand up double (a lined shot off the center field fence) with the bases loaded in the 4th inning, and he reached 1st base on a fielders choice in the 1st inning. He scored 4 times in 4 plate appearances, and had 11 RBIs. Coach Marshall removed Ross from the game to a standing ovation to teammates and fans on hand after Ross fielded a grounder in the top of the 4th inning. Ross was featured that evening on CNN Sports by anchor Jim Huber.

Ross was 1 of 3 seniors on a Saint Leo team that went 22-26-2 (4-20 in Sunshine State Conference play). The previous year Ross started at 1st base on a Saint Leo team that started 7 seniors, was ranked 5th in the nation in the final regular season Collegiate Baseball Poll, and went 46-13 (17-11 in Conference play, and 13-1 vs. Division I schools), and tied for the second most wins in the nation in Division II during the regular season.

In Ross' final game of his college career, at home versus Conference rival Eckerd College, Ross hit a home run in his last at-bat.

Ross was inducted into the Sunshine State Conference Hall of Fame in the class of 1992–93. In the Conference he is #1 in career batting average, #1 in slugging percentage, and 3rd in RBIs.

Ross was inducted into the Saint Leo Athletic Hall of Fame in 1993.

=== NCAA Division II Records ===
Record #	What	How Many	NCAA Div II Rank	Notes
1	2 Grand Slams in 1 inning	1	Tied 1st	1st player ever to accomplish in Div II (had been done twice before in Div 1, never in Div III at that point)
2	Grand Slams in 1 game	2	Tied 1st	3rd player ever in Div II to accomplish
3	RBIs in 1 inning	8	Tied 2nd	Held the record until 1996
4	RBIs in 1 game	11	Tied 3rd	Accomplished in only 4 plate appearances
5	RBIs per game	1.80	Tied 9th	90 RBIs in 50 games; Was ranked 4th after the 1985 season
6	RBIs season	90	No longer ranked	Was 4th after the 1985 season; 11 of the Top 15 players ahead in this category played in 60 or more games, 10 or more than Ross
7	Slugging percentage	.962	No longer ranked	Was ranked 8th after the 1985 season; of the Top 15 in this category, 14 played in less games than Ross
8	HRs per game average	.44	No longer ranked	22 HRs in 50 games
