= Norm Kaye =

Norm Kaye ("Coach K") (Born 1931, — Died August 7, 2025), founded the Sunshine State Conference (SSC) of the U.S. National Collegiate Athletic Association (NCAA) in 1975 in Florida. The SSC is one of the NCAA Division II sports conferences in the United States, having won 83 national championships. The six charter conference members were: Biscayne College (now called St. Thomas University), Florida Technological University (now University of Central Florida), Eckerd College, Florida Southern College, Rollins College, and Saint Leo College.

At the time of the conference's founding, Kaye was Athletic Director and Head Basketball Coach at Saint Leo College (now Saint Leo University). Kaye served as Commissioner of the SSC in its first year of existence, and then served as Executive Director of the conference for the following 12 years.

He was instrumental in building the Saint Leo athletic program over the course of five decades. He pioneered the professional physical education program at Saint Leo, which included Sports Management, Teacher Education, and General Physical Education. In 1977 he was named Chairman of the Division of Physical Education. Kaye also served Saint Leo for a three-year period as Dean of Student Affairs and Director of Financial Aid.

Kaye is credited with coaching and mentoring hundreds of successful athletes and students. Notable Saint Leo baseball players who played in Major League Baseball include Fred Cambria, Brian Dayett, Bob Tewksbury, and Jim Corsi. J. P. Ricciardi played baseball for Saint Leo and afterwards in the minor leagues before becoming a scout in the Oakland Athletics organization and later a front office position. Ricciardi later became General Manager of the Toronto Blue Jays and is special assistant to New York Mets General Manager Sandy Alderson. Current San Francisco Giants General Manager Brian Sabean was an assistant baseball coach at Saint Leo. In 1984 Kaye hired former Major League Baseball Cy Young Award Winner Mike Marshall to be head baseball coach at Saint Leo. Mark Carlson, a former student sports information director for Kaye, is current Director of Broadcasting for the United States Golf Association (USGA).

== Awards ==
Kaye was inducted into the Illinois Basketball Hall of Fame. Kaye was inducted into the Saint Leo Hall of Fame in 1991.
