= 2023 NCAA Division II men's basketball tournament =

- Teams: 64
- Finals site: Ford Center, Evansville, Indiana
- Champions: Nova Southeastern Sharks (1st title)
- Runner-up: West Liberty Hilltoppers (2nd title game)
- Semifinalists: Cal State San Bernardino Coyotes (2nd Final Four); Black Hills State Yellow Jackets (2nd Final Four)
- Winning coach: Jim Crutchfield (1st title)
- MOP: Will Yoakum & RJ Sunahara (Nova Southeastern)

The 2023 NCAA Division II men's basketball tournament was the single-elimination tournament to determine the annual national champion of men's NCAA Division II college basketball in the United States.

The championship rounds were held from March 21–25, 2023 at the Ford Center in Evansville, Indiana.

Nova Southeastern won their first ever national championship, beating West Liberty 111–101 in the championship game. The Sharks also completed a perfect 36–0 season, the first team to do so since Northwest Missouri State in 2019.

McKendree and North Georgia participated in the tournament for the first time, with both winning tournament games, and the former making it to the Regional Final.

== Tournament schedule and venues ==
2023 NCAA Division II Men's sites - regionals (cyan) Elite Eight (red)

=== Regionals ===
First, second, and third-round games (the last of which doubles as a regional championship), will take place on campus sites from March 11–14, 2023. The top-seeded team in each regional serves as host.

=== Elite Eight ===
The national quarterfinals, semifinals, and finals were held at a predetermined site, the Ford Center in Evansville, Indiana, from March 21–25, 2023.

== Qualifying ==
A total of sixty-four bids are available for the tournament: 23 automatic bids (awarded to the champions of the twenty-three Division II conferences) and 41 at-large bids.

The bids are allocated evenly among the eight NCAA-designated regions (Atlantic, Central, East, Midwest, South, South Central, Southeast, and West), each of which contains either two or three of the twenty-three Division II conferences that sponsor men's basketball. Each region consists of two or three automatic qualifiers (the teams who won their respective conference tournaments) and either five or six at-large bids, awarded regardless of conference affiliation.

=== Automatic bids (23) ===
Automatic bids
Region (Bids)	Conference	School	Record (Conf.)	Appearance	Last bid
Atlantic (3)	CIAA	Winston-Salem State	21–8	16th	2020
Atlantic (3)	Mountain East	West Liberty	28–3	15th	2022
Atlantic (3)	PSAC	Indiana (PA)	30–1	19th	2022
Central (3)	Great American	Southern Arkansas	22–9	2nd	2021
Central (3)	MIAA	Northwest Missouri State	30–2	23rd	2022
Central (3)	Northern Sun	Minnesota State–Moorhead	25–6	8th	2022
East (3)	CACC	Caldwell	21–9	3rd	2021
East (3)	East Coast	St. Thomas Aquinas	26–4	8th	2022
East (3)	Northeast–10	Saint Anselm	22–7	25th	2022
Midwest (3)	GLIAC	Northern Michigan	24–7	9th	2000
Midwest (3)	GLVC	McKendree	18–12	1st	Never
Midwest (3)	Great Midwest	Ashland	22–9	11th	2021
South (3)	Gulf South	West Alabama	26–5	7th	2022
South (3)	SIAC	Miles	23–6	5th	2022
South (3)	Sunshine State	Nova Southeastern	30–0	4th	2022
South Central (2)	Lone Star	West Texas A&M	25–6	20th	2022
South Central (2)	RMAC	Fort Lewis	28–3	12th	2018
Southeast (3)	Carolinas	Emmanuel (GA)	23–7	3rd	2021
Southeast (3)	Peach Belt	Augusta	26–5	15th	2022
Southeast (3)	South Atlantic	Catawba	23–7	12th	2020
West (3)	CCAA	Cal State San Bernardino	27–3	16th	2022
West (3)	Great Northwest	Northwest Nazarene	15–14	2nd	2021
West (3)	PacWest	Point Loma	27–3	6th	2022

=== At-large bids (41) ===
At-large bids
Region (Bids)	School	Conference	Record (Conf.)	Appearance	Last bid
Atlantic (5)	East Stroudsburg	PSAC	23–8	8th	2019
Atlantic (5)	Fairmont State	Mountain East	24–7	14th	2022
Atlantic (5)	Mercyhurst	PSAC	24–5	7th	2022
Atlantic (5)	Pittsburgh–Johnstown	PSAC	20–10	5th	2009
Atlantic (5)	Virginia Union	CIAA	23–7	30th	2018
Central (5)	Central Oklahoma	MIAA	26–5	14th	2022
Central (5)	Emporia State	MIAA	22–8	3rd	2007
Central (5)	Minnesota–Duluth	Northern Sun	23–9	7th	2022
Central (5)	Northern State	Northern Sun	24–6	15th	2021
Central (5)	Southern Nazarene	Great American	25–4	4th	2020
East (5)	Bentley	Northeast–10	21–6	20th	2022
East (5)	Dominican (NY)	CACC	21–8	6th	2022
East (5)	New Haven	Northeast–10	20–10	10th	2022
East (5)	Pace	Northeast–10	20–10	6th	2022
East (5)	Southern New Hampshire	Northeast–10	20–8	21st	2017
Midwest (5)	Ferris State	GLIAC	23–8	16th	2022
Midwest (5)	Hillsdale	Great Midwest	23–6	8th	2022
Midwest (5)	Indianapolis	GLVC	26–4	13th	2020
Midwest (5)	UMSL	GLVC	21–10	5th	2022
Midwest (5)	Wisconsin–Parkside	GLIAC	21–8	7th	2017
South (5)	Alabama–Huntsville	Gulf South	25–7	15th	2022
South (5)	Embry–Riddle	Sunshine State	19–11	3rd	2022
South (5)	Lee	Gulf South	20–7	3rd	2021
South (5)	Tuskegee	SIAC	20–8	5th	2014
South (5)	West Georgia	Gulf South	20–8	18th	2021
South Central (6)	Angelo State	Lone Star	25–6	10th	2022
South Central (6)	Black Hills State	RMAC	25–5	2nd	2022
South Central (6)	Colorado Mesa	RMAC	25–5	10th	2022
South Central (6)	Colorado Mines	RMAC	26–5	12th	2021
South Central (6)	Lubbock Christian	Lone Star	19–11	5th	2022
South Central (6)	Texas A&M–Kingsville	Lone Star	22–10	8th	2022
Southeast (5)	Lander	Peach Belt	22–9	6th	2020
Southeast (5)	Lincoln Memorial	South Atlantic	27–4	12th	2022
Southeast (5)	North Georgia	Peach Belt	20–7	1st	Never
Southeast (5)	UNC Pembroke	Carolinas	26–3	9th	2022
Southeast (5)	USC Aiken	Peach Belt	22–8	9th	2019
West (5)	Academy of Art	PacWest	21–9	2nd	2022
West (5)	Azusa Pacific	PacWest	22–7	6th	2022
West (5)	Cal State San Marcos	CCAA	19–10	2nd	2022
West (5)	Montana State Billings	Great Northwest	20–9	11th	2012
West (5)	St. Martin's	Great Northwest	24–6	3rd	2019

== Regionals ==
=== Atlantic ===
- Site: Indiana, Pennsylvania (Indiana (PA))

First round March 11
1	Indiana (PA)	52
8	Winston–Salem State	50
5	Fairmont State	64
4	Virginia Union	66
3	Mercyhurst	72
6	East Stroudsburg	66
7	Pittsburgh–Johnstown	88
2	West Liberty	112

Regional semifinals March 12
1	Indiana (PA)	60
4	Virginia Union	45
3	Mercyhurst	72
2	West Liberty	86

Regional Finals; March 14
1	Indiana (PA)	53
2	West Liberty	70

=== Central ===
- Site: Maryville, Missouri (NW Missouri State)

First round March 11
1	Northwest Missouri State	94
8	Southern Arkansas	69
5	Southern Nazarene	67*
4	Minnesota State–Moorhead	64
3	Central Oklahoma	56
6	Minnesota–Duluth	62
7	Emporia State	72
2	Northern State	51

Regional semifinals March 12
1	Northwest Missouri State	57
5	Southern Nazarene	61
6	Minnesota–Duluth	84
7	Emporia State	79

Regional Finals; March 14
5	Southern Nazarene	52
6	Minnesota–Duluth	62

* – Denotes overtime period

=== East ===
- Site: Manchester, New Hampshire (St. Anselm)

First round March 11
1	St. Anselm	71
8	Caldwell	80
5	Pace	57
4	New Haven	83
3	Southern New Hampshire	78
6	St. Thomas Aquinas	64
7	Dominican (NY)	67
2	Bentley	77

Regional semifinals March 12
8	Caldwell	56
4	New Haven	77
3	Southern New Hampshire	46
2	Bentley	73

Regional Finals; March 14
4	New Haven	69
2	Bentley	60

=== Midwest ===
- Site: Indianapolis, Indiana (Indianapolis)

First round March 11
1	Indianapolis	63
8	McKendree	77
5	Northern Michigan	86
4	Hillsdale	81
3	Ashland	70
6	Ferris State	71
7	Wisconsin–Parkside	60
2	Missouri–St. Louis	85

Regional semifinals March 12
8	McKendree	93
5	Northern Michigan	83
6	Ferris State	68
2	Missouri–St. Louis	82

Regional Finals; March 14
8	McKendree	60
2	Missouri–St. Louis	62

=== South ===
- Site: Davie, Florida (Nova Southeastern)

First round March 11
1	Nova Southeastern	97
8	Miles	55
5	West Georgia	74
4	Lee	61
3	Alabama–Huntsville	76
6	Embry–Riddle	69
7	Tuskegee	64
2	West Alabama	70

Regional semifinals March 12
1	Nova Southeastern	105
5	West Georgia	74
3	Alabama–Huntsville	72
2	West Alabama	56

Regional Finals; March 14
1	Nova Southeastern	87
3	Alabama–Huntsville	62

=== South Central ===
- Site: Canyon, Texas (West Texas A&M)

First round March 11
1	West Texas A&M	78
8	Texas A&M–Kingsville	56
5	Colorado Mesa	57
4	Angelo State	72
3	Colorado School of Mines	48
6	Black Hills State	68
7	Lubbock Christian	65
2	Fort Lewis	97

Regional semifinals March 12
1	West Texas A&M	69
4	Angelo State	59
6	Black Hills State	81
2	Fort Lewis	66

Regional Finals; March 14
1	West Texas A&M	67
6	Black Hills State	68

=== Southeast ===
- Site: Augusta, Georgia (Augusta)

First round March 11
1	Augusta	83
8	Emmanuel (GA)	74
5	Catawba	79
4	South Carolina–Aiken	88
3	Lincoln Memorial	76
6	Lander	63
7	North Georgia	76
2	UNC Pembroke	58

Regional semifinals March 12
1	Augusta	77
4	South Carolina–Aiken	84
3	Lincoln Memorial	84
7	North Georgia	74

Regional Finals; March 14
4	South Carolina–Aiken	83
3	Lincoln Memorial	89

=== West ===
- Site: San Diego, California (Point Loma)

First round March 10
1	Point Loma	78
8	Northwest Nazarene	64
5	Academy of Art	93*
4	St. Martin's	89
3	Azusa Pacific	62
6	Cal State San Marcos	72
7	Montana State Billings	57
2	Cal State San Bernardino	63

Regional semifinals March 11
1	Point Loma	83
5	Academy of Art	70
6	Cal State San Marcos	61
2	Cal State San Bernardino	67

Regional Finals; March 13
1	Point Loma	83
2	Cal State San Bernardino	89

* – Denotes overtime period

=== Elite Eight ===
- Site: Ford Center, Evansville, Indiana

Elite Eight; March 21, 2023
1	Nova Southeastern	82
8	Missouri–St. Louis	75
4	Cal State San Bernardino	88
5	Lincoln Memorial	70
2	West Liberty	95
7	New Haven	58
3	Black Hills State	86
6	Minnesota–Duluth	68

Final Four; March 23, 2023
1	Nova Southeastern	94
4	Cal State San Bernardino	87
2	West Liberty	87
3	Black Hills State	82

National championship March 25, 2023
1	Nova Southeastern	111
2	West Liberty	101

== See also ==
- 2023 NCAA Division II women's basketball tournament
- 2023 NCAA Division I men's basketball tournament
- 2023 NCAA Division III men's basketball tournament
- 2023 NAIA men's basketball tournament
