= Nova Southeastern Sharks men's basketball =

Nova Southeastern Sharks
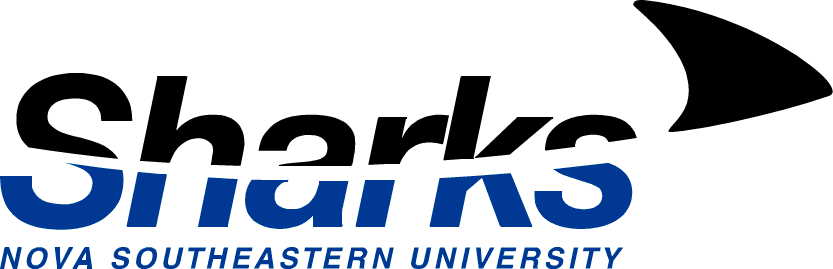
- University: Nova Southeastern University
- First season: 1982–83
- Head coach: Jim Crutchfield (9th season)
- Location: Davie, Florida
- Arena: Rick Case Arena (capacity: 4,500)
- Conference: Sunshine State Conference
- Nickname: Sharks
- Colors: Navy blue and gray

NCAA Division II tournament champions
- 2023, 2025
Other NCAA Division II tournament results
Runner-up	2024
Final Four	2023, 2024, 2025, 2026
Elite Eight	2019, 2022, 2023, 2024, 2025, 2026
Sweet Sixteen	2019, 2022, 2023, 2024, 2025, 2026
Appearances	2019, 2020, 2022, 2023, 2024, 2025, 2026

Conference tournament champions
- SSC: 2022, 2023, 2024, 2025, 2026

The NSU Sharks Men's Basketball team represents Nova Southeastern University in Davie, Florida. They currently compete in the Sunshine State Conference.

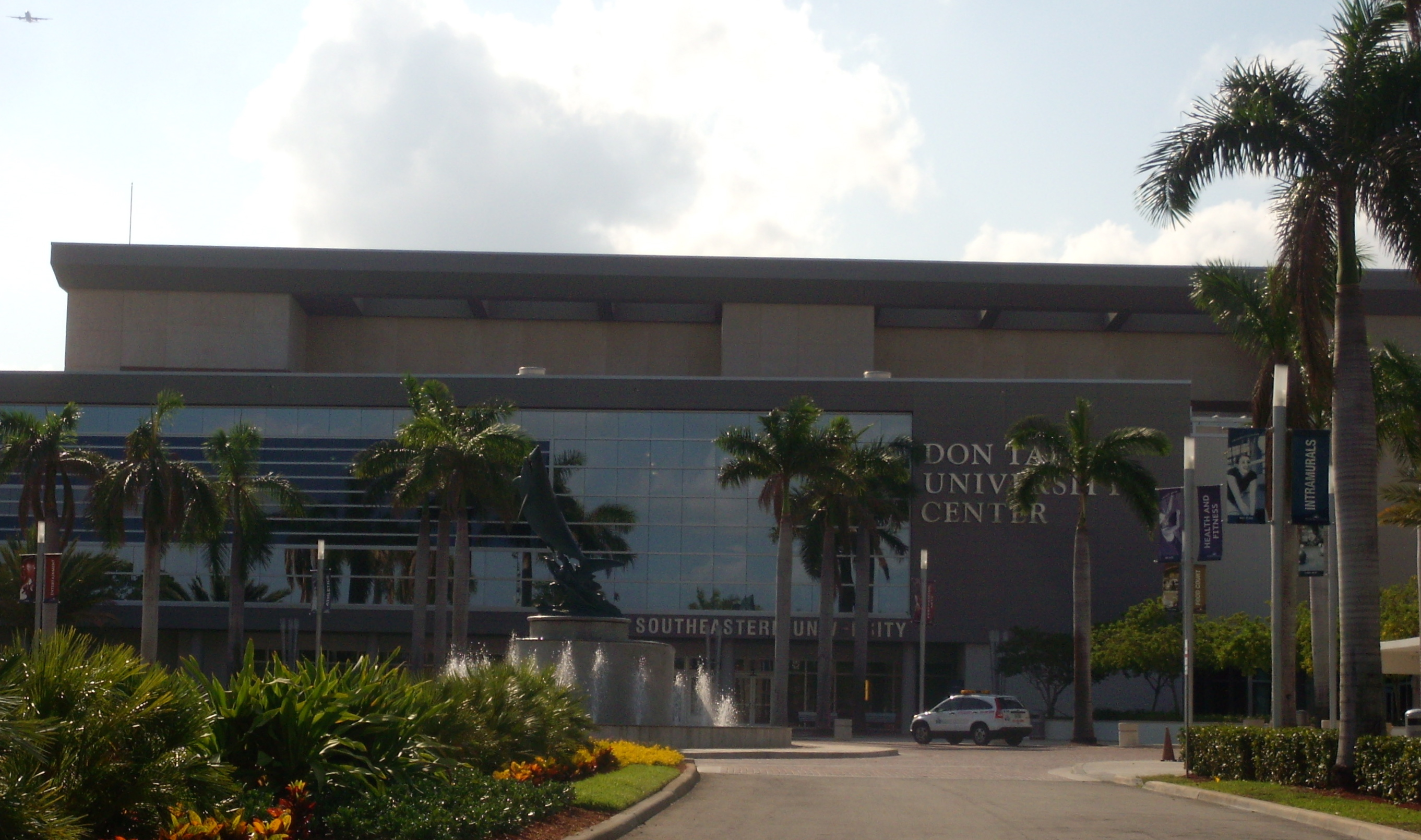
Exterior of The University Center

They won national championships in the 2022–23 and 2024–25 seasons.

== Coaching records ==
Record table
Season	Coach	Overall	Conference	Standing	Postseason
Charles "Sonny" Hansley (NAIA Independent) (1982–1990)
1982–83	Charles "Sonny" Hansley	6–15			
1983–84	Charles "Sonny" Hansley	11–12			
1984–85	Charles "Sonny" Hansley	11–13			
1985–86	Charles "Sonny" Hansley	12–14			
1986–87	Charles "Sonny" Hansley	12–16			
1987–88	Charles "Sonny" Hansley	9–19			
1988–89	Charles "Sonny" Hansley	5–23			
1989–90	Charles "Sonny" Hansley	13–16			
Charles "Sonny" Hansley (Sun Conference) (1990–1998)
1990–91	Charles "Sonny" Hansley	7–21	3–11		
1991–92	Charles "Sonny" Hansley	13–14	8–6		
1992–93	Charles "Sonny" Hansley	15–14	8–6		NAIA District 7 Playoffs First Round
1993–94	Charles "Sonny" Hansley	16–18	7–7		
1994–95	Charles "Sonny" Hansley	22–12			
1995–96	Charles "Sonny" Hansley	5–24	3–11		
1996–97	Tony McAndrews	15–18	6–7		
1997–98	Tony McAndrews	15–14	8–6		
Tony McAndrews:		187–263 (.416)			
Kit Riley (Sun Conference) (1998–2002)
1998–99	Tony McAndrews	18–14	9–5		
1999–00	Tony McAndrews	14–14	7–5		
2000–01	Tony McAndrews	8–20	3–9		
2001–02	Tony McAndrews	4–23	4–8		
Tony McAndrews (Sunshine State Conference) (2002–2004)
2002–03	Tony McAndrews	6–23			
2003–04	Tony McAndrews	9–18			
Tony McAndrews:		59–112 (.345)			
Gary Tuell (Sunshine State Conference) (2004–2017)
2004–05	Gary Tuell	7–21	3–13		
2005–06	Gary Tuell	17–11	11–5		
2006–07	Gary Tuell	14–15	8–8	4th	
2007–08	Gary Tuell	10–18	5–11	8th	
2008–09	Gary Tuell	16–11	9–7	3rd	
2009–10	Gary Tuell	13–15	6–10	6th	
2010–11	Gary Tuell	12–15	5–11	T–6th	
2011–12	Gary Tuell	13–14	7–9	6th	
2012–13	Gary Tuell	15–12	7–9	6th	
2013–14	Gary Tuell	13–17	8–8	T–5th	
2014–15	Gary Tuell	12–16	6–10	T–5th	
2015–16	Gary Tuell	11–16	6–10	T–5th	
2016–17	Gary Tuell	6–20	3–15	10th	
Gary Tuell:		159–201 (.442)	84–126 (.400)		
Jim Crutchfield (Sunshine State Conference) (2017–present)
2017–18	Jim Crutchfield	17–10	11–9	T–4th	
2018–19	Jim Crutchfield	29–4	18–2	1st	NCAA Division II First Round
2019–20	Jim Crutchfield	23–6	15–5	2nd	Postseason canceled due to COVID-19 pandemic
2020–21	Jim Crutchfield	0–0	0–0	N/A	Season canceled due to COVID-19 pandemic
2021–22	Jim Crutchfield	31–1	20–0	1st	NCAA Division II Elite Eight
2022–23	Jim Crutchfield	36–0	20–0	1st	NCAA Division II Champions
2023–24	Jim Crutchfield	32–3	18–2	1st	NCAA Division II Runner Up
2024–25	Jim Crutchfield	36–1	19–1	1st	NCAA Division II Champions
Jim Crutchfield:		204–25 (.891)	121–19 (.864)		
Total:		609–601 (.503)			
National champion Postseason invitational champion Conference regular season champion Conference regular season and conference tournament champion Division regular season champion Division regular season and conference tournament champion Conference tournament champion

== Notable players ==
=== National players of the year ===
==== NABC Player of the Year ====
- RJ Sunahara (2023)
- MJ Iraldi (2025)

==== Bevo Francis Award ====
- RJ Sunahara (2023)
- MJ Iraldi (2025)

=== All-Americans ===
- Mark Matthews – NABC (2020)
- Sekou Sylla – NABC (2022)
- RJ Sunahara – NABC (2023)
- MJ Iraldi – NABC (2025)
