= Ricky Love =

American basketball player

Personal information
- Born: Houston, Mississippi, U.S.
- Listed height: 6 ft 8 in (2.03 m)
- Listed weight: 235 lb (107 kg)

Career information
- College: Phillips (1973–1975); Alabama–Huntsville (1975–1977)
- NBA draft: 1977: 2nd round, 38th overall pick
- Drafted by: Golden State Warriors
- Position: Power forward

Career history
- 1978–1979: Maine Lumberjacks

Career highlights
- Second-team NAIA All-American (1977)
- Stats at Basketball Reference

Ricky Love is an American former basketball player. He played collegiately for the Phillips Haymakers and the Alabama–Huntsville Chargers, which were both university teams in the National Association of Intercollegiate Athletics (NAIA). During his senior season with the Chargers, Love was named a second-team NAIA All-American. He ranks 14th in total points scored for the Chargers, which is the highest for a two-year player at Alabama–Huntsville. Love holds the Chargers record for most blocks in a game with 7 during a December 13, 1976 performance against the Spring Hill Badgers.

Love was selected by the Golden State Warriors as the 38th overall pick in the 1977 NBA draft but never played in the National Basketball Association (NBA). Love did play a season in the Continental Basketball Association CBA, averaging 12.1 points and 5.7 rebounds in 46 games for the Maine Lumberjacks in the 1978–79 season.
