= Rex Sunahara =

American football player (born 1996)

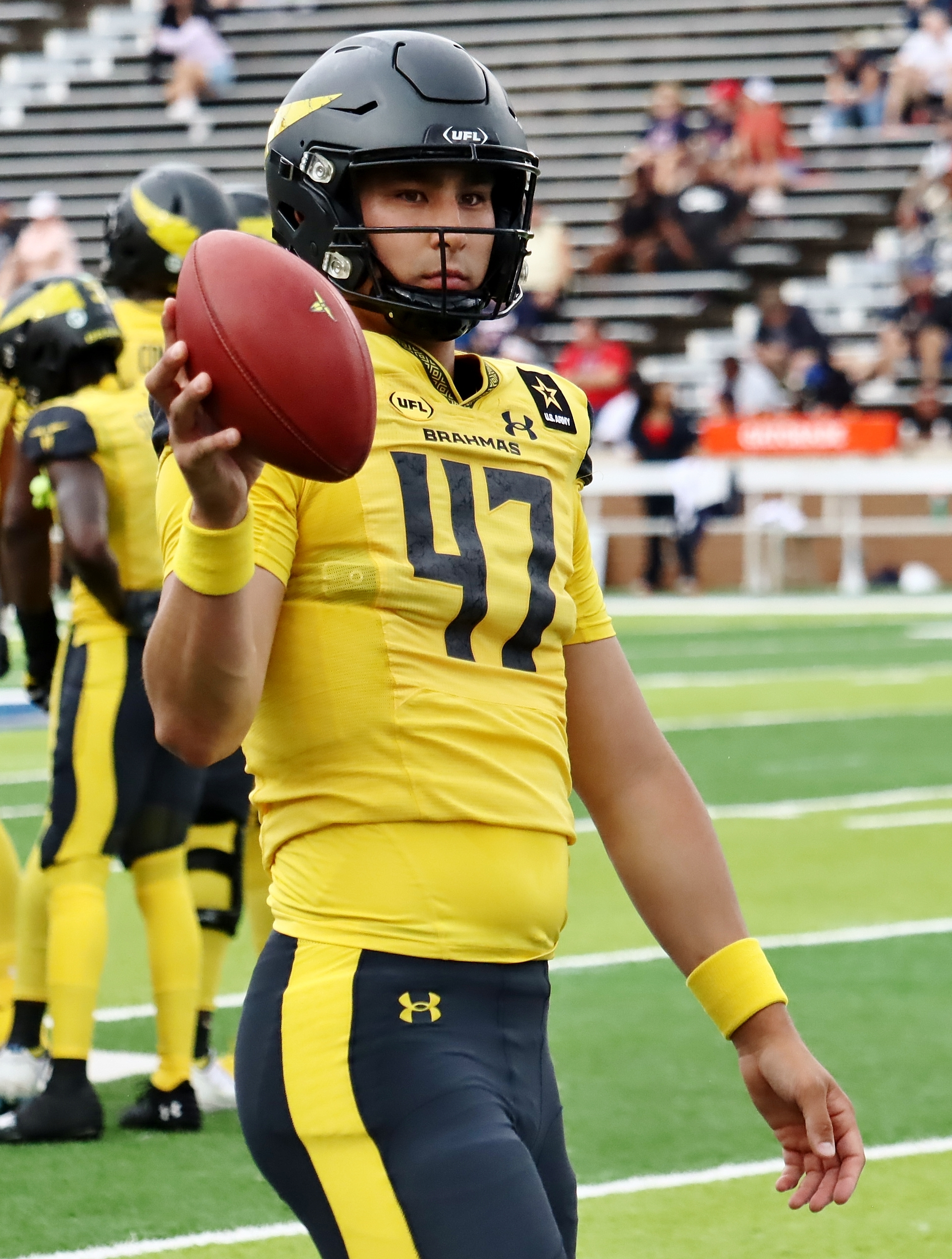
- Sunahara with the San Antonio Brahmas in 2024

No. 50 – Cleveland Browns
- Position: Long snapper
- Roster status: Active

Personal information
- Born: October 9, 1996 (age 30); Bay Village, Ohio, U.S.
- Listed height: 6 ft 6 in (1.98 m)
- Listed weight: 242 lb (110 kg)

Career information
- High school: Bay (Bay Village)
- College: Rhode Island (2015); West Virginia (2016–2019)
- NFL draft: 2020: undrafted

Career history
- Miami Dolphins (2020)*; Pittsburgh Steelers (2021)*; San Antonio Brahmas (2023); Pittsburgh Steelers (2023)*; San Antonio Brahmas (2024); Cleveland Browns (2024–present)
- * Offseason or practice squad member only

Career NFL statistics as of Week 8, 2026
- Games played: 37
- Total tackles: 11
- Stats at Pro Football Reference

Rex Sunahara (born October 9, 1996) is an American professional football long snapper for the Cleveland Browns of the National Football League (NFL). He played college football for the Rhode Island Rams and West Virginia Mountaineers.

== Early life ==
Sunahara was born on October 9, 1996. He is of Japanese descent via his father Reed, who came from Hawaii and is the head coach of the women's volleyball program at University of Hawai’i at Hilo.His younger brother RJ played college basketball for Georgia.

He attended Bay High School, where he played varsity baseball, football, and basketball. He played as a wide receiver and defensive back in high school. In his senior year, he earned All-Ohio Division IV Third Team honors.

After high school, he committed to the University of Rhode Island in order to remain a multi-sport athlete and converted to playing long snapper.

== College career ==
=== University of Rhode Island ===
Sunahara played football at Rhode Island and walked on to the basketball team. During the football season, he appeared in eight games as the long snapper and recorded 4 special teams tackles. During the basketball season, he appeared in 3 games and logged 1 rebound. After his first year at Rhode Island, Sunahara decided to transfer to West Virginia and attempt to walk-on to the football team.

=== West Virginia University ===
Sunahara walked on to the West Virginia football team before the 2016 season and served as a backup to Nick Meadows for two years. In 2018, Sunahara became the Mountaineers starting long snapper. Over the 2018 and 2019 seasons, Sunahara started 24 games and recorded 4 special teams tackles. Following the 2019 season, Sunahara was named a Patrick Mannelly Award Semifinalist. He was also invited to participate in the 2020 NFLPA Collegiate All-Star Game and the 2020 Hula Bowl All-Star Game.

== Professional career ==
Pre-draft measurables
Height	Weight	Arm length	Hand span	Wingspan
6 ft 6 1/4 in (1.99 m)	249 lb (113 kg)	35 1/8 in (0.89 m)	10 1/2 in (0.27 m)	6 ft 9 1/4 in (2.06 m)
All values from Pro Day

=== Miami Dolphins ===
Sunahara signed with the Miami Dolphins as an undrafted free agent on August 1, 2020. He was waived on August 4, and participated in a workout for the Pittsburgh Steelers before being re-signed to the Dolphins' practice squad on November 16. Sunahara signed a reserve/futures deal upon completion of the 2020 NFL season and returned to the Dolphins practice squad for the 2021 season. Sunahara was again waived by the Dolphins on August 9, 2021.

=== Pittsburgh Steelers ===
Sunahara signed with the Pittsburgh Steelers on December 8, 2021, and was assigned to the practice squad. He was cut two days later, but returned to sign a reserve/futures contract with Pittsburgh on January 18, 2022. The Steelers waived Sunahara on May 10.

=== San Antonio Brahmas ===
On November 17, 2022, Sunahara was selected with the 7th pick of the specialists phase of the 2023 XFL draft by the San Antonio Brahmas. He appeared in all ten games before receiving an invitation to a workout with the Steelers on June 2, 2023.

=== Pittsburgh Steelers (second stint) ===
On June 19, 2023, Sunahara signed a one-year contract with the Steelers. He was released by Pittsburgh on August 26.

=== San Antonio Brahmas (second stint) ===
On January 24, 2024, Sunahara re-signed with the San Antonio Brahmas. His contract was terminated on August 8.

=== Cleveland Browns ===
On August 8, 2024, Sunahara signed with the Cleveland Browns. He was waived by Cleveland on August 26, and was subsequently re-signed to the team's practice squad. Sunahara was released again on August 29. He was signed to the active roster on October 9.

On April 6, 2026, Sunahara re-signed with the Browns.

== NFL career statistics ==
Legend
**Bold**	Career high

=== Regular season ===
Year	Team	Games		Tackles					Interceptions						Fumbles				
Year	Team	GP	GS	Cmb	Solo	Ast	Sck	TFL	Int	Yds	Avg	Lng	TD	PD	FF	Fum	FR	Yds	TD
2024	CLE	12	0	2	1	1	0.0	0	0	0	0.0	0	0	0	0	0	0	0	0
2025	CLE	17	0	**7**	**3**	**4**	0.0	0	0	0	0.0	0	0	0	0	0	0	0	0
Career		29	0	9	4	5	0.0	0	0	0	0.0	0	0	0	0	0	0	0	0
