= MJ Iraldi =

American basketball player (born 2001)

No. 12 – Noblesville Boom
- Position: Small forward
- League: NBA G League

Personal information
- Born: August 31, 2001 (age 25) Westville, New Jersey, U.S.
- Listed height: 6 ft 6 in (1.98 m)
- Listed weight: 190 lb (86 kg)

Career information
- High school: West Deptford (West Deptford, New Jersey)
- College: Chestnut Hill (2021–2023); Nova Southeastern (2023–2025)
- NBA draft: 2025: undrafted
- Playing career: 2025–present

Career history
- 2025–present: Noblesville Boom

Career highlights
- NCAA Division II champion (2025); NCAA Division II tournament MOP (2025); NABC Division II Player of the Year (2025); Bevo Francis Award (2025); First-team NCAA Division II All-American (2025); SSC Player of the Year (2025); First-team All-SSC (2025); SSC tournament MVP (2025)
- Stats at Basketball Reference

Joseph "MJ" Iraldi (born August 31, 2001) is an American basketball player for the Noblesville Boom of the NBA G League. He played college basketball for the Chestnut Hill Griffins and Nova Southeastern Sharks.

== Early life and high school ==
Iraldi grew up in West Deptford, New Jersey and attended West Deptford High School.

== College career ==
Iraldi began his college career at Chestnut Hill College, playing two seasons and then entering the NCAA transfer portal. He landed at Nova Southeastern University in Davie, Florida, attracted to their wide-open offensive system. He was a starter in his first season at NSU, then led the team to its second national championship in three seasons, averaging 23.6 points per game and being named the tournament MVP after scoring 27 points in the championship game.

At the close of his senior season, Iraldi was generally considered the top player in NCAA Division II, receiving several national awards, including NABC Division II Player of the Year and the Bevo Francis Award.

== Professional career ==
After going undrafted in the 2025 NBA draft, Iraldi was signed by the Noblesville Boom of the NBA G League.

On September 14, 2026, Iraldi signed an Exhibit 10 contract with the Indiana Pacers. However, he was waived by Indiana the following day.
