= Bay High School (Ohio) =

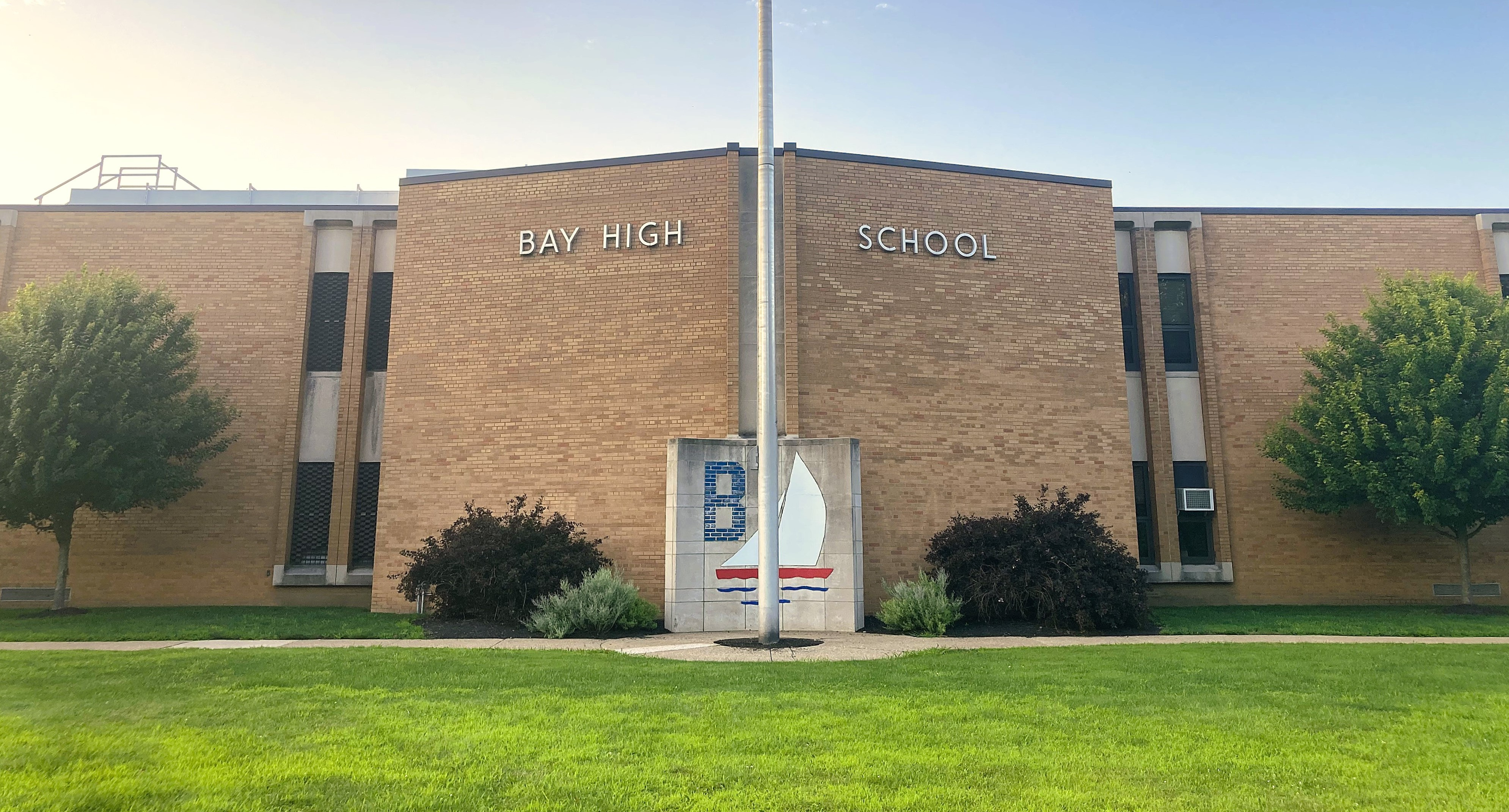

Location
- 29230 Wolf Road; Bay Village, Ohio 44140; United States
- 41°29′14″N 81°56′36″W

Information
- Type: Public high school
- School district: Bay Village School District
- Superintendent: Scot Prebles
- Principal: Jason Martin
- Enrollment: 769 (2023-24)
- Colors: Blue, White and Red
- Athletics conference: Cleveland West Conference
- Nickname: Rockets
- Rivals: Rocky River
- Newspaper: The Bay Window
- Website: www.bayk12.org/o/bhs

Bay High School is a public high school located in Bay Village, Ohio, west of Cleveland, Ohio.

The school colors are blue, white and red. The sports teams are known as the Bay Rockets. The school is a member of the Cleveland West Conference.

== Recognition ==
In 2024, U.S. News & World Report listed Bay High School as one of the top five high schools in the Cleveland Metropolitan Area.

In 2010, Bay High School was named a U.S. Blue Ribbon School.

Bay Village City School District has been designated a Best Community in Music Education in America since 2003. Bay High School has a wide variety of award-winning music programs, including bands, choirs, and orchestras.

== School Profile ==
As of the 2024-2025 academic year, Bay High School had a student to faculty ratio of 12:1, and 82% of faculty had advanced degrees. Over 75% of students attend 4-year colleges and universities following graduation.

== Athletics ==
=== Ohio High School Athletic Association State Championships ===
- Boys Wrestling – 1972
- Boys Cross Country – 1976, 1991, 1992
- Girls Gymnastics - 1978
- Boys Soccer – 1991, 1993
- Girls Soccer – 1999, 2002, 2003, 2024, 2025

== Notable alumni ==
- Brad Friedel - soccer goalkeeper and coach
- Bob Gibbs - United States Congressman
- Patricia Heaton - actress
- David Nemec - baseball historian
- Richard Patrick - musician
- Lili Reinhart - actress
- Joe Schriner - political activist
- RJ Sunahara - basketball player
- Rex Sunahara - NFL Longsnapper
- Kate Voegele - musician
- Dave Zastudil - NFL punter
