= Bay Village City School District =

School district in Ohio, United States

Address
- 377 Dover Center Road Bay Village, Ohio; United States
- Coordinates: 41°29′3″N 81°55′36″W

District information
- Type: Public
- Grades: PK–12
- Superintendent: Scot T. Prebles
- NCES District ID: 3904354

Students and staff
- Enrollment: 2,333 (2025–2026)
- Teachers: 157.53 (on an FTE basis) (2025–2026)
- Staff: 290.38 (on an FTE basis) (2025–2026)
- Student–teacher ratio: 14.81 (2025–2026)

Other information
- Website: www.bayvillageschools.com

The Bay Village City School District is a public school district that serves Bay Village, Ohio.

== Schools ==
- Bay High School
- Bay Middle School
- Westerly Elementary School
- Normandy Elementary School
- Glenview Center for Childcare & Learning
