= Sunshine State Conference men's basketball tournament =

Annual basketball tournament

- Conference basketball championship
- Sport: College basketball
- Conference: Sunshine State Conference
- Number of teams: 8
- Format: Single-elimination tournament
- Played: 1978–present
- Current champion: Nova Southeastern (5th)
- Most championships: Florida Southern (25)
- Official website: SSC men's basketball

The Sunshine State Conference men's basketball tournament is the annual conference basketball championship tournament for the NCAA Division II Sunshine State Conference. The tournament has been held annually since 1978. It is a single-elimination tournament and seeding is based on regular season records.

The winner receives the conference's automatic bid to the NCAA Men's Division II Basketball Championship.

== Results ==
Year	Champions	Score	Runner-up	MVP	Venue
1978	Central Florida	103–66	Rollins	Jerry Prather, Central Florida	Lakeland Civic Center (Lakeland, FL)
1979	Florida Southern	57–51	Rollins	Lester Wright, Florida Southern	UCF Education Gymnasium (Orlando, FL)
1980	Florida Southern	100–74	Rollins	Kurt Alston, Florida Southern	UCF Education Gymnasium (Orlando, FL)
1981	Florida Southern	86–77	Central Florida	John Ebeling, Florida Southern	UCF Education Gymnasium (Orlando, FL)
1982	Biscayne College	68–66	Central Florida	Perry Smith, Biscayne	Jenkins Field House (Lakeland, FL)
1983	Florida Southern	93–74	Central Florida	Tom Ridley, Florida Southern	Jenkins Field House (Lakeland, FL)
1984	Tampa	53–52	Central Florida	Todd Linder, Tampa	Jenkins Field House (Lakeland, FL)
1985	Tampa	57–52	Florida Southern	Todd Linder, Tampa	Bob Martinez Athletics Center (Tampa, FL)
1986	Florida Southern	73–66	Saint Leo	Glenn Hanson, Florida Southern	Bob Martinez Athletics Center (Tampa, FL)
1987	Florida Southern	70–66	Tampa	Todd Linder, Tampa	Jenkins Field House (Lakeland, FL)
1988	Florida Southern	63–62	Tampa	Jerry Johnson, Florida Southern	Jenkins Field House (Lakeland, FL)
1989	Florida Southern	68–67	Tampa	Kris Kearney, Florida Southern	Bob Martinez Athletics Center (Tampa, FL)
1990	Florida Southern	69–67	Tampa	Michael Dean, Florida Southern	Bob Martinez Athletics Center (Tampa, FL)
1991	Florida Southern	77–66	Florida Tech	Derek Flowers, Florida Southern	Enyart-Alumni Field House (Winter Park, FL)
1992	Rollins	74–64	Barry	David Wolf, Rollins	Enyart-Alumni Field House (Winter Park, FL)
1993	Florida Southern	71–67	Tampa	DeCarlo Deveaux, Tampa	Bob Martinez Athletics Center (Tampa, FL)
1994	Eckerd	77–71^{OT}	Tampa	Rodney Chatman, Eckerd	Bob Martinez Athletics Center (Tampa, FL)
1995	Tampa	77–75	Eckerd	Idris Mays, Tampa	Lakeland Center (Lakeland, FL)
1996	Florida Southern	53–49	North Florida	Chris Sneed, North Florida	Lakeland Center (Lakeland, FL)
1997	Tampa	73–67	Florida Southern	Puncho Farquarson, Tampa	Lakeland Center (Lakeland, FL)
1998	Florida Southern	68–66^{OT}	Florida Tech	Eric Osborne, Florida Southern	Lakeland Center (Lakeland, FL)
1999	Florida Southern	53–52	Lynn	Innocent Kere, Florida Southern	Lakeland Center (Lakeland, FL)
2000	Florida Southern	63–54	Florida Tech	Innocent Kere, Florida Southern	Lakeland Center (Lakeland, FL)
2001	Florida Southern	81–76	Barry	Nick Railsback, Florida Southern	Lakeland Center (Lakeland, FL)
2002	Tampa	62–45	Florida Southern	Jon Brown, Tampa	Clemente Center (Melbourne, FL)
2003	Florida Southern	81–68	Rollins	Matt Story, Florida Southern	Jenkins Field House (Lakeland, FL)
2004	Eckerd	67–57	Florida Southern	Steve Berg, Eckerd	Alfond Sports Center (Winter Park, FL)
2005	Lynn	63–50	Eckerd	Justin Wingard, Lynn	Health and Sports Center (Miami Shores, FL)
2006	Rollins	57–56	Barry	John Thinnes, Rollins	Marion Bowman Activities Center (Saint Leo, FL)
2007	Eckerd	67–52	Rollins	Matt Centaus, Eckerd	Sports and Cultural Center (Boca Raton, FL)
2008	Florida Southern	83–81^{OT}	Tampa	Braxton Williams, Florida Southern	Bob Martinez Athletics Center (Tampa, FL)
2009	Florida Southern	77–76^{OT}	Rollins	Rob Eldridge, Florida Southern	Don Taft University Center (Davie, FL)
2010	Rollins	66–59	Barry	Myk Brown, Rollins	Don Taft University Center (Davie, FL)
2011	Rollins	75–66	Eckerd	Nick Wolf, Rollins	Clemente Center (Melbourne, FL)
2012	Florida Southern	61–58	Saint Leo	Seth Evans, Florida Southern	Jenkins Field House (Lakeland, FL)
2013	Florida Southern	72–66	Rollins	Seth Evans, Florida Southern	Silver Spurs Arena (Kissimmee, FL)
2014	Florida Southern	84–74	Tampa	Kevin Capers, Florida Southern	Silver Spurs Arena (Kissimmee, FL)
2015	Florida Southern	93–83	Barry	Kevin Capers, Florida Southern	Silver Spurs Arena (Kissimmee, FL)
2016	Eckerd	87–84	Barry	E. J. Moody, Eckerd	ICI Center (Daytona Beach, FL)
2017	Rollins	71–70	Palm Beach Atlantic	Jeff Merton, Rollins	ICI Center (Daytona Beach, FL)
2018	Eckerd	96–71	Barry	Marco Behori, Eckerd	Jenkins Fieldhouse (Lakeland, FL)
2019	Florida Southern	92–84	Nova Southeastern	Brett Hanson, Florida Southern	Don Taft University Center (Davie, FL)
2020	Florida Southern	118–109	Nova Southeastern	Brett Hanson, Florida Southern	Jenkins Fieldhouse (Lakeland, FL)
2021	Saint Leo	83-70	Florida Southern	Frank Webb Jr., Saint Leo	Marion Bowman Activities Center (Saint Leo, FL)
2022	Nova Southeastern	98-85	Barry	RJ Sunahara, Nova Southeastern	Rick Case Arena (Fort Lauderdale, FL)
2023	Nova Southeastern	92–69	Embry–Riddle	Will Yoakum, Nova Southeastern	Rick Case Arena (Fort Lauderdale, FL)
2024	Nova Southeastern	87–76	Barry	Shane Hunter, Nova Southeastern	Rick Case Arena (Fort Lauderdale, FL)
2025	Nova Southeastern	103–89	Florida Southern	MJ Iraldi, Nova Southeastern	Rick Case Arena (Fort Lauderdale, FL)
2026	Nova Southeastern	92–85	Palm Beach Atlantic		Rick Case Arena (Fort Lauderdale, FL)

== Championship records ==
School	Finals Record	Finals Appearances	Years
Florida Southern	25–5	30	1979, 1980, 1981, 1983, 1986, 1987, 1988, 1989, 1990, 1991, 1993, 1996, 1998, 1999, 2000, 2001, 2003, 2008, 2009, 2012, 2013, 2014, 2015, 2019, 2020
Tampa	5–8	13	1984, 1985, 1995, 1997, 2002
Rollins	5–7	12	1992, 2006, 2010, 2011, 2017
Eckerd	5–3	8	1994, 2004, 2007, 2016, 2018
Nova Southeastern	5–2	7	2022, 2023, 2024, 2025, 2026
UCF	1–4	5	1978
Saint Leo	1–2	3	2021
Lynn	1–1	2	2005
St. Thomas (FL) (Biscayne College)	1–0	1	1982
Barry	0–9	9	
Florida Tech	0–3	3	
Palm Beach Atlantic	0–2	2	
Embry–Riddle	0–1	1	
North Florida	0–1	1	

- Schools highlighted in pink are former members of the Sunshine State Conference

== See also ==
- NCAA Division II men's basketball tournament
