= Clemente Center =

Sports arena in Melbourne, Florida, US

Coordinates: 28.06332°N 80.62256°W

The Charles and Ruth Clemente Center for Sports and Recreation, also known as the Clemente Center, is a 3,500-seat indoor sports arena located in Melbourne, Florida. It is the home of the Florida Tech Panthers basketball and volleyball teams. The arena is also used for concerts, trade shows, conventions, graduation ceremonies and other special events.

In addition to the main arena, the Clemente Center also features an intramural gymnasium, two fitness centers, a multipurpose room, and a food court known as Center Court. An "air wall" separates the main arena from the intramural gymnasium and is removable for events requiring a large seating capacity. Clemente Center is also home to the administrative offices for Florida Tech's athletic department.

The 57,250-square-foot facility is named for Charles and Ruth Clemente, who donated $3.3 million toward the arena. The $6.8 million center opened in summer 2001 in time for the volleyball season.

== See also ==
- List of convention centers in the United States
