= 2022 NCAA Division II men's basketball tournament =

- Teams: 64
- Finals site: Ford Center, Evansville, Indiana
- Champions: Northwest Missouri Bearcats (4th title)
- Runner-up: Augusta Jaguars (2nd title game)
- Semifinalists: Black Hills State Yellow Jackets (1st Final Four); Indiana (PA) Crimson Hawks (5th Final Four)
- Winning coach: Ben McCollum (4th title)
- MOP: Trevor Hudgins (Northwest Missouri)

The 2022 NCAA Division II men's basketball tournament was the single-elimination tournament to determine the national champion of men's NCAA Division II college basketball in the United States.

The championship rounds were held from March 22 to 26, 2022 at the Ford Center in Evansville, Indiana. The tournament returned to its pre-COVID-19 pandemic field of sixty-four teams.

Defending champions Northwest Missouri State defeated Augusta in the championship game, 67–58, to win their fourth Division II national men's title. The Bearcats became the first to win three consecutive Division II titles, although including that the 2020 tournament was not held.

Seven teams participated in the tournament for the first time: Academy of Art, Black Hills State, Cal State San Marcos, Cedarville, Davenport, Embry-Riddle, and Savannah State, though Embry-Riddle had qualified for the 2020 tournament that was ultimately canceled due to the COVID-19 pandemic.

== Tournament schedule and venues ==
2022 NCAA Division II men's sites – regionals (white) and Elite Eight (red)

=== Regionals ===
First-, second-, and third-round games, which comprise each regional championship, will take place on campus sites on March 11, 12, and 14. With the exception of the West Regional, the top-seeded team in each regional will serve as host.

These eight locations were chosen to host regional games for the 2022 tournament:

- Atlantic: Kovalchick Convention and Athletic Complex, Indiana University of Pennsylvania, Indiana, Pennsylvania
- Central: Sanford Pentagon, Augustana University, Sioux Falls, South Dakota
- East: Bentley Arena, Bentley University, Waltham, Massachusetts
- Midwest: Cecchini Center, Walsh University, North Canton, Ohio
- South: Rick Case Arena, Nova Southeastern University, Fort Lauderdale, Florida
- South Central: Rip Griffin Center, Lubbock Christian University, Lubbock, Texas
- Southeast: Christenberry Fieldhouse, Augusta University, Augusta, Georgia
- West: Coussoulis Arena, California State University, San Bernardino, San Bernardino, California

=== Elite Eight ===
The national quarterfinals, semifinals, and finals were held on March 22, 24, and 26 at a pre-determined site, the Ford Center in Evansville, Indiana.

== Qualification ==
A total of sixty-four bids are available for the tournament: 23 automatic bids (awarded to the champions of the twenty-three Division II conferences) and 41 at-large bids.

The bids are allocated evenly among the eight NCAA-designated regions (Atlantic, Central, East, Midwest, South, South Central, Southeast, and West), each of which contains either two or three of the 23 Division II conferences that sponsor men's basketball (after the Heartland Conference disbanded in 2019, the South Central Region now features only two conferences). Each region consists of two or three automatic qualifiers (the teams who won their respective conference tournaments) and either five or six at-large bids, awarded regardless of conference affiliation.

=== Automatic bids (23) ===
Automatic bids
Region (Bids)	Conference	School	Record (Conf.)	Appearance	Last bid
Atlantic (3)	CIAA	Fayetteville State	21–8	3rd	1993
Atlantic (3)	Mountain East	West Liberty	29–2	12th	2021
Atlantic (3)	PSAC	Indiana (PA)	29–2	17th	2019
Central (3)	Great American	Southwestern Oklahoma State	14–16	2nd	2005
Central (3)	MIAA	Northwest Missouri State	28–5	21st	2021
Central (3)	Northern Sun	Minnesota State-Moorhead	19–11	7th	2021
East (3)	CACC	Felician	19–9	2nd	2010
East (3)	East Coast	St. Thomas Aquinas	26–4	6th	2021
East (3)	Northeast-10	Bentley	22–4	6th	2021
Midwest (3)	GLIAC	Davenport	17–13	1st	Never
Midwest (3)	GLVC	Missouri–St. Louis	24–6	3rd	1988
Midwest (3)	G-MAC	Walsh	23–6	2nd	2019
South (3)	Gulf South	Alabama–Huntsville	22–10	14th	2021
South (3)	SIAC	Savannah State	15–13	1st	Never
South (3)	Sunshine State	Nova Southeastern (1st)	28–0	2nd	2019
South Central (2)	Lone Star	West Texas A&M	27–6	18th	2021
South Central (2)	RMAC	Black Hills State	22–7	1st	Never
Southeast (3)	Carolinas	Belmont Abbey	22–9	8th	2021
Southeast (3)	Peach Belt	Augusta	28–3	13th	2019
Southeast (3)	South Atlantic	Queens (NC)	28–3	13th	2021
West (3)	CCAA	Cal State San Marcos	20–4	1st	Never
West (3)	GNAC	Alaska	12–14	6th	2006
West (3)	PacWest	Academy of Art	20–11	1st	Never

=== At-large bids (41) ===
At-large bids
Region (Bids)	School	Conference	Record (Conf.)	Appearance	Last bid
Atlantic (5)	California (PA)	PSAC	21–9	14th	2008
Atlantic (5)	Fairmont State	Mountain East	23–7	12th	2021
Atlantic (5)	Mercyhurst	PSAC	24–6	5th	2021
Atlantic (5)	Millersville	PSAC	25–6	11th	2008
Atlantic (5)	West Virginia State	Mountain East	23–7	6th	2010
Central (5)	Augustana (SD)	NSIC	24–3	15th	2017
Central (5)	Central Oklahoma	MIAA	24–6	13th	2011
Central (5)	Minnesota Duluth	NSIC	25–5	6th	2003
Central (5)	Upper Iowa	NSIC	25–5	3rd	2017
Central (5)	Washburn	MIAA	21–10	16th	2021
East (5)	Dominican (NY)	CACC	21–7	4th	2021
East (5)	Franklin Pierce	NE-10	18–10	7th	2014
East (5)	New Haven	NE-10	17–8	9th	2019
East (5)	Pace	NE-10	19–9	5th	2007
East (5)	Saint Anselm	NE-10	17–10	23rd	2019
Midwest (5)	Cedarville	G-MAC	19–12	1st	Never
Midwest (5)	Ferris State	GLIAC	21–8	14th	2018
Midwest (5)	Findlay	G-MAC	19–10	15th	2019
Midwest (5)	Hillsdale	G-MAC	20–7	7th	2021
Midwest (5)	Truman State	GLVC	20–9	10th	2021
South (5)	Barry	Sunshine State	20–8	9th	2018
South (5)	Embry-Riddle	Sunshine State	22–9	1st	Never
South (5)	Miles	SIAC	24–4	3rd	2019
South (5)	Union (TN)	Gulf South	23–8	4th	2016
South (5)	West Alabama	Gulf South	24–6	6th	2019
South Central (6)	Angelo State	Lone Star	20–9	8th	2019
South Central (6)	Colorado Mesa	RMAC	24–9	7th	2021
South Central (6)	Dallas Baptist	Lone Star	17–11	6th	2021
South Central (6)	Lubbock Christian	Lone Star	26–3	4th	2021
South Central (6)	Texas A&M–Commerce	Lone Star	17–8	9th	2019
South Central (6)	Texas A&M–Kingsville	Lone Star	18–10	6th	2017
Southeast (5)	Columbus State	Peach Belt	20–10	14th	2017
Southeast (5)	Flagler	Peach Belt	23–7	2nd	2021
Southeast (5)	Georgia College	Peach Belt	21–7	7th	2010
Southeast (5)	Lincoln Memorial	SAC	25–4	9th	2021
Southeast (5)	UNC Pembroke	Carolinas	26–3	7th	2019
West (5)	Azusa Pacific	PacWest	20–9	4th	2018
West (5)	Cal State San Bernardino	CCAA	23–3	14th	2014
West (5)	Cal Poly Pomona	CCAA	13–9	16th	2019
West (5)	Chico State	CCAA	19–4	15th	2017
West (5)	Point Loma Nazarene	PacWest	21–9	4th	2021

== Regionals ==
=== Atlantic Regional ===
- Site: Indiana, Pennsylvania (IUP)

First round March 12
1	Indiana (PA)	65
8	Fayetteville State	49
5	Millersville	65
4	Mercyhurst	71
3	California (PA)	95
6	Fairmont State	74
7	West Virginia State	103*
2	West Liberty	94

Regional semifinals March 13
1	Indiana (PA)	58
4	Mercyhurst	55
3	California (PA)	67
7	West Virginia State	65

Regional Finals; March 15
1	Indiana (PA)	68
3	California (PA)	59

* – Denotes overtime period

=== Central Regional ===
- Site: Sioux Falls, South Dakota (Augustana (SD))

First round March 12
1	Augustana (SD)	83
8	SW Oklahoma State	64
5	Central Oklahoma	74
4	Upper Iowa	91
3	NW Missouri State	69
6	Minnesota State Moorhead	54
7	Washburn	83
2	Minnesota Duluth	73

Regional semifinals March 13
1	Augustana (SD)	65
4	Upper Iowa	60
3	Northwest Missouri State	70
7	Washburn	55

Regional Finals; March 15
1	Augustana (SD)	56
3	Northwest Missouri State	70

=== East Regional ===
- Site: Waltham, Massachusetts (Bentley)

First round March 12
1	Bentley	95
8	Felician	63
5	Pace	77
4	Dominican (NY)	64
3	Saint Anselm	70
6	New Haven	78
7	St. Thomas Aquinas	76
2	Franklin Pierce	69

Regional semifinals March 13
1	Bentley	96
5	Pace	84
6	New Haven	61
7	St. Thomas Aquinas	71

Regional Finals; March 15
1	Bentley	82
7	St. Thomas Aquinas	75

=== Midwest Regional ===
- Site: North Canton, Ohio (Walsh)

First round March 11
1	Walsh	82
8	Davenport	56
5	Missouri–St. Louis	73
4	Truman State	68
3	Hillsdale	68
6	Cedarville	61
7	Findlay	81
2	Ferris State	87

Regional semifinals March 12
1	Walsh	58
5	UMSL	87
3	Hillsdale	90
2	Ferris State	74

Regional Finals; March 14
5	UMSL	63
3	Hillsdale	73

=== South Regional ===
- Site: Fort Lauderdale, Florida (Nova Southeastern)

First round March 12
1	Nova Southeastern	113
8	Savannah State	62
5	Miles	50
4	Union (TN)	65
3	Embry-Riddle	82
6	West Alabama	60
7	Alabama–Huntsville	106
2	Barry	99

Regional semifinals March 13
1	Nova Southeastern	81
4	Union (TN)	80
3	Embry-Riddle	82
7	Alabama-Huntsville	67

Regional Finals; March 15
1	Nova Southeastern	71
3	Embry-Riddle	68

=== South Central Regional ===
- Site: Lubbock, Texas (Lubbock Christian)

First round March 12
1	Lubbock Christian	80
8	Texas A&M–Commerce	63
5	Texas A&M–Kingsville	55
4	Colorado Mesa	69
3	Black Hills State	76
6	Dallas Baptist	68
7	Angelo State	76
2	West Texas A&M	84

Regional semifinals March 13
1	Lubbock Christian	62
4	Colorado Mesa	63
3	Black Hills State	91
2	West Texas A&M	77

Regional Finals; March 15
4	Colorado Mesa	62
3	Black Hills State	72

=== Southeast Regional ===
- Site: Augusta, Georgia (Augusta)

First round March 12
1	Augusta	106
8	Belmont Abbey	77
5	Flagler	70
4	UNC Pembroke	74
3	Lincoln Memorial	100
6	Georgia College	65
7	Columbus State	84
2	Queens (NC)	86

Regional semifinals March 13
1	Augusta	82
4	UNC-Pembroke	76
3	Lincoln Memorial	76
2	Queens (NC)	81

Regional Finals; March 15
1	Augusta	77
2	Queens (NC)	76

=== West Regional ===
- Site: San Bernardino, California (Cal State San Bernardino)

First round March 11
1	Cal State San Marcos	63
8	Alaska	70
5	Azusa Pacific	66
4	Point Loma Nazarene	64
3	Chico State	78
6	Academy of Art	61
7	Cal Poly Pomona	69
2	Cal State San Bernardino	72

Regional semifinals March 12
8	Alaska	72*
5	Azusa Pacific	71
3	Chico State	91
2	Cal State San Bernardino	82

Regional Finals; March 14
8	Alaska	52
3	Chico State	70

* – Denotes overtime period

=== Elite Eight ===
- Site: Ford Center, Evansville, Indiana

Elite Eight; March 22, 2022
1	Nova Southeastern	67
8	Black Hills State	77
4	Bentley	43
5	Northwest Missouri State	61
2	Indiana (PA)	67
7	Hillsdale	55
3	Augusta	81*
6	Chico State	69

Final Four; March 24, 2022
8	Black Hills State	57
5	Northwest Missouri State	70
2	Indiana (PA)	61
3	Augusta	76

National championship March 26, 2022
5	Northwest Missouri State	67
3	Augusta	58

* – Denotes overtime period

== All-tournament team ==
- Trevor Hudgins, Northwest Missouri
- Tyshaun Crawford, Augusta
- Ja'Queze Kirby, Augusta
- Joel Scott, Black Hills State
- Luke Waters, Northwest Missouri

== See also ==
- 2022 NCAA Division II women's basketball tournament
- 2022 NCAA Division I men's basketball tournament
- 2022 NCAA Division III men's basketball tournament
- 2022 NAIA men's basketball tournament
