= UAH Chargers =

Athletic teams based at University of Alabama in Huntsville

- University: University of Alabama in Huntsville
- Nickname: Chargers
- NCAA: Division II
- Conference: Gulf South (primary); Peach Belt (men's lacrosse)
- Athletic director: Dr. Cade Smith
- Location: Huntsville, Alabama
- Varsity teams: 15 (7 men's, 8 women's)
- Basketball arena: Spragins Hall
- Baseball stadium: Charger Park
- Softball stadium: Charger Park
- Soccer stadium: Charger Park
- Lacrosse stadium: Charger Park
- Colors: Blue and white
- Mascot: Charger Blue
- Website: uahchargers.com

The UAH Chargers are the athletic teams that represent the University of Alabama in Huntsville, located in Huntsville, Alabama, in intercollegiate sports at the Division II ranks of the National Collegiate Athletic Association (NCAA). The Chargers have primarily competed in the Gulf South Conference (GSC) since the 1993–94 academic year.

UAH competes in fifteen intercollegiate varsity sports. Men's sports include baseball, basketball, cross country, lacrosse, soccer and track and field (indoor and outdoor); while women's sports include basketball, cross country, lacrosse, soccer, softball, track and field (indoor and outdoor) and volleyball.

UAH was the host institution for the 2012 Frozen Four at the St. Pete Times Forum in Tampa, Florida.

== History ==
Student athletic clubs for crew, soccer, and basketball had formed when UAH became an independent institution in 1969. The original team mascot, selected through student contest, was the Uhlan, a non-traditional nickname containing the letters U, A, and H. The name was amended to Uhlan Chargers for the war horses the Uhlans rode, and as a nod to the electricity generated in the Tennessee Valley region through the Tennessee Valley Authority. Over time, the use of the name Uhlan faded, leaving Chargers as the official mascot. The students chose blue and white as the colors to avoid similarity to the crimson and white of UAH's parent school, the University of Alabama.

In 1973, UAH's elevated its crew, men's soccer, and men's basketball, to varsity status, and the university became a member of the National Association of Intercollegiate Athletics (NAIA).

Women's basketball was added in 1977. Men's ice hockey was elevated from club to varsity in 1985, along with the addition of men's and women's cross country.

UAH became a Division II member of the NCAA beginning with the 1986–87 academic year, along with the addition of volleyball and tennis programs. Men's and women's cross country was suspended in 1987 because of proration, but were reinstated in 1992.

UAH joined the Gulf South Conference in 1993. Baseball, softball and women's soccer were added in 1996.

The creation of track and field programs for women (2001) and men (2004) raised the number of programs to 14.

Men's and women's lacrosse began play in the spring of 2016.

Former UAH varsity programs are men's golf (eliminated in 1987), crew (relegated in club status), men's tennis (2020), women's tennis (2020), and men's ice hockey (2021).

== Conference affiliations ==
Other

- Independent – 1969–70 to 1972–73

NAIA

- Southern States Conference – 1973–74 to 1992–93

NCAA

- NCAA D-II Independent – 1986–87 to 1992–93
- Gulf South Conference – 1993–94 to Present

== Varsity teams ==
Men's sports	Women's sports
Baseball	Basketball
Basketball	Cross country
Cross country	Lacrosse
Lacrosse	Soccer
Soccer	Softball
Track and field^{†}	Track and field^{†}
	Volleyball
† – Track and field includes both indoor and outdoor

=== Men's basketball ===
Varsity basketball at UAH began in 1973 under coach Kayo Willis, who turned the Chargers into an NAIA power. Willis compiled a 205–136 record over 11 seasons as the Chargers won or shared five Southern States Conference titles, and won five SSC Tournament titles. The Chargers earned four NAIA tournament berths (1976, 1977, 1981, 1983) as NAIA District 27 champions. In 1980-81, UAH finished 30-7, losing in the NAIA championship game to Bethany Nazarene College (now Southern Nazarene University) 86–85 in overtime.

Lennie Acuff was the head coach at UAH from 1997-2019, and is the program's all-time winningest coach with 437 victories. UAH won at least a share of six GSC Eastern Division or league regular season titles, and three GSC Tournament titles (2012, 2015, and 2017). The Chargers have appeared in the NCAA Division II tournament 11 times (2000, 2003, 2006, 2010, 2011, 2012, 2013, 2015, 2016, 2017, and 2019). Acuff became head coach at Lipscomb in 2019.

In 2010–11, the Chargers went 29–5, hosted the South Regional and earned their first berth in the Elite Eight, losing to Minnesota State 95–91 in the quarterfinals.

UAH went 29–4 in 2011–12, winning the GSC regular season title, its first GSC Tournament title, and another South Region championship at home. The Chargers lost to Bellarmine in the Elite Eight quarterfinals, 82–73.

In 2012, UAH was the first Division II program to participate in the NIT Season Tip-Off. The Chargers faced four Division I opponents, and defeated North Texas 78–75 in the first round before losing to Kansas State, Cleveland State, and Bowling Green. The Chargers had a 25–6 record in 2012–13, earning their third straight appearance in the South Region championship game.

UAH has won six Gulf South Conference tournament titles, and appeared in the NCAA Division II tournament 16 times. In the 2024-25 season, the Chargers had a 32-game winning streak.

Josh Magette, a two-time All-American and UAH's all-time leader in assists (878) and steals (268) from 2008-12, is the first Charger to play in the NBA. Magette played 18 games with the Atlanta Hawks in the 2017-18 NBA season.

=== Women's basketball ===
The UAH women's basketball program began in 1977 as a member of the Association of Intercollegiate Athletics for Women (AIAW). The program joined the NAIA in 1981, and under then-athletics director Dennis Killips, reached the finals of the regional tournament.

Donna Caldwell Dunnaway took over as head coach in 1982, and led the Lady Chargers to district championship. UAH lost to Southwestern Oklahoma, 80–68, in the 1983 NAIA national championship game in Kansas City and finished 27–8.

In the 2011–12 season, UAH had its best record in 29 years under head coach Roy Heintz. The Lady Chargers won 23 games, losing seven, while earning their first GSC tournament final berth and NCAA Division II tournament berth.

The Lady Chargers returned to the NCAA tournament in 2012–13 after winning their first GSC tournament championship. UAH defeated Tuskegee 78–69 for its first NCAA tournament victory before losing to Delta State, 81–58.

=== Softball ===
Les Stuedeman led the UAH softball program for 30 years, from its inception in 1996 until her retirement in 2025. The Chargers won 1,297 games over her tenure, the 14th most career wins in NCAA softball history and the third most in Division II. UAH has appeared in the GSC championship game 14 times, winning nine titles.

UAH has earned a berth in the NCAA Tournament 26 times in 30 seasons (including 21 straight tournaments from 2003–2024), winning the South Region title four times (1999, 2001, 2009, and 2011). The Chargers have reached the national championship game twice, losing to Lock Haven 8–0 in 2009 and losing to UC San Diego 10–3 in 2011.

=== Baseball ===
UAH began baseball play in 1996 under head coach Bobby Pierce, who guided the Chargers to four GSC East Division titles and one GSC championship (2001). UAH reached the NCAA Division II tournament four straight seasons (1998–2001), reaching the South Central Region finals in 1999 and 2000. Pierce would leave UAH in 2002 to become head coach at Troy. The Chargers won the GSC championship in 2014 and earned NCAA Tournament berths in 2012 and 2014 under coach Hunter Royer.

=== Men's soccer ===
UAH soccer began in 1969 when students approached Dr. Ostap Stromecky for his assistance in forming a club team. Stromecky would coach the Chargers for 21 years, compiling a 265–90–29 record at the club and varsity levels. UAH became an intercollegiate sport in the fall of 1973, joining the NAIA. UAH won the NAIA District 27 championship 16 times and earned seven berths in the NAIA national tournament. UAH lost to Quincy University 2–0 in the 1978 national championship game. Stromecky retired from coaching in 1990.

Under coach Carlos Petersen, UAH won GSC championships in 1996 and 1997, and earned its first NCAA Division II tournament berth in 1997. In 1996, the Chargers finished 16–1–1, its best record in program history, losing 2–1 to NCAA Division II national champion Lynn University and drawing with NAIA No. 1 Life University.

=== Other accomplishments ===
- The men's ice hockey program won two NCAA Division II national championships (1996, 1998), and reached the NCAA Division I tournament twice (2007, 2010).
- The volleyball program has reached the NCAA Division II tournament seven times (1998,1999, 2001, 2004, 2005, 2019, 2021).
- The women's cross country program has won 3 GSC titles (1999, 2003 and 2004) and reached the NCAA championships twice (2003 and 2004). The men's team won the GSC title in 2007, 2011, 2012, 2019, 2020, 2021, and 2022.

== Facilities ==
Spragins Hall is the home of the basketball and volleyball teams, as well as the athletics department. It is named after Marion Beirne Spragins, who was a major contributor to the establishment of UAH.

Charger Park, built in 2010, is the home of the baseball, softball, lacrosse, and soccer teams.

== Traditions ==
=== Pep band ===
The UAH pep band has claimed to have the "World's Longest Cheer", which consists of the crowd being directed to repeat each letter of the university's formal name, including spaces between words ("The University of Alabama in Huntsville"). After this, the cheer continues with "Now say it like a marketing major!" (to which the response is "UAHuntsville") and concludes with "Now say it like an engineer!" (the response being "UAH", which is then repeated several times). In the event of an interruption (such as a score), the pep band will resume where it left off after playing the fight song.

== Notable alumni ==
=== Ice hockey ===
- Jared Ross
- Cam Talbot

=== Men's basketball ===
- JJ Kaplan
- Ricky Love
- Josh Magette
- Jaime Smith
- Joe Troy Smith
- Chaney Johnson
