= Sunshine State Conference =

College athletic conference in Florida, US

- Association: NCAA
- Founded: 1975
- Commissioner: Chris Graham (since 2025)
- Sports fielded: 21; men's: 9; women's: 12
- Division: Division II
- No. of teams: 11 (12 in 2027)
- Headquarters: Orlando, Florida
- Region: Florida
- Website: sunshinestateconference.com

Locations
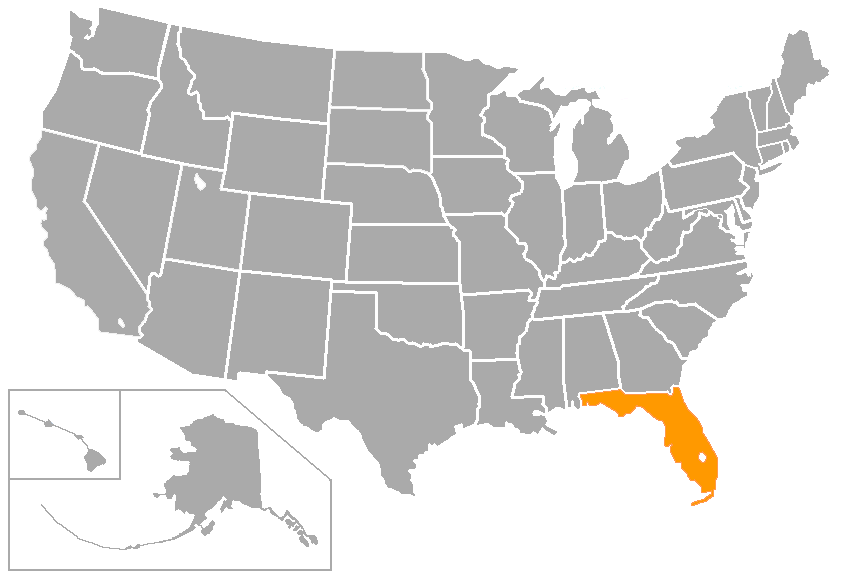

The Sunshine State Conference is a college athletic conference affiliated with the National Collegiate Athletic Association (NCAA) at the Division II level. All of its member institutions are located in the state of Florida, which is popularly known as the Sunshine State.

The conference was originally formed in 1975 as a men's basketball conference. It has since expanded to sponsor championships in 21 sports, including men's and women's basketball, baseball, women's beach volleyball, men's and women's cross country, men's and women's golf, men's and women's lacrosse, men's and women's outdoor track, women's rowing, men's and women's soccer, softball, men's and women's swimming, men's and women's tennis, women's volleyball.

SSC institutions have won a total of 144 NCAA national team championships, including an NCAA Division II record nine in the 2025–26 academic year. The conference has also claimed a total of 103 national runner-up trophies.

== History ==
The conference was preceded by the Florida Intercollegiate Conference, which was disbanded in the mid-1960s. The Sunshine State Conference was founded in 1975 by Saint Leo University (then Saint Leo College) basketball coach & athletic director Norm Kaye. Kaye served as Commissioner the first year until Dick Pace was named Commissioner in 1976. Kaye continued as Executive Director of the Conference for an additional 12 years. Pace was inducted into the Florida Sports Hall of Fame in 1985.

The six charter Conference members were: Biscayne College (now St. Thomas University), Florida Technological University (now University of Central Florida), Eckerd College, Florida Southern College, Rollins College, and Saint Leo College.

The Conference has seen dozens of athletes go on to have successful professional careers. Some examples include: Current PGA Tour players Lee Janzen and Rocco Mediate went to Florida Southern. Janzen won golf's U.S. Open in 1993 & 1998; on the baseball side are Tino Martinez (Tampa), Tim Wakefield (Florida Tech), Ryan Hanigan (Rollins), Bob Tewksbury (Saint Leo), and J. D. Martinez (Nova Southeastern). Wakefield tied a career high of 17 wins pitching for the 2007 World Series Champion Boston Red Sox and Tewksbury was third in balloting for the National League Cy Young Award while going 16–5 for the St. Louis Cardinals in 1992.

=== Chronological timeline ===
Sunshine State Conference
Location of members: full, future
- March 2, 1975 – Basketball conference exploration meeting is held at Florida Southern College in Lakeland. Main purpose of meeting is to discuss formation of an NCAA Division II mid-Florida basketball conference.
- March 16, 1975 – Second exploration meeting is held at Eckerd College in St. Petersburg. The name "Sunshine State Conference" is suggested by Dr. Calvin C. Miller and is adopted for league use. Norm Kaye of Saint Leo is named Interim Commissioner. Dr. Thomas B. Southard, president of Saint Leo College, is named as first conference president.
- June 1975 – Conference constitution adopted.
- October 8, 1975 – First meeting of the SSC is held in Orlando. Basketball regulations and league bylaws are revised and approved.
- December 3, 1975 – Florida Southern defeats Eckerd, 96–84, in first SSC basketball game played in Saint Petersburg.
- April 8, 1976 – Dick Pace is named league commissioner. NCAA approves automatic bid for SSC basketball champion. Golf and Tennis are added to league for 1976–77, baseball and soccer are added for 1977–78.
- May 18, 1977 – First Sunshine State Conference men's basketball tournament held
- February 1, 1981 – Norm Kaye of Saint Leo is appointed as executive of SSC. Executive Committee is formed, consisting of league athletic directors.
- July 1, 1981 – Florida Institute of Technology joins the Sunshine State Conference.
- September 2, 1981 – The University of Tampa joins the Sunshine State Conference.
- April 15, 1982 – League adopts women's competition in basketball, cross country, slow-pitch softball, tennis, and volleyball.
- May 1, 1984 – University of Central Florida (formerly Florida Technological University) withdraws from the conference. Women's fast-pitch softball is adopted for league play in 1985.
- February 2, 1986 – Bob Vanatta, athletic director at Louisiana Tech University, is named as league's first full-time commissioner.
- June 13, 1988 – Barry University joins the conference.
- November 1990 – Conference signs a two-year contract with the Sunshine Network for seven events.
- February 11, 1991 – University of North Florida joins the conference, effective July 1, 1992.
- July 1, 1994 – Don Landry is named conference commissioner and conference relocates to Orlando.
- November 22, 1994 – Conference announces three-year deal to have postseason basketball tournament at The Lakeland Center. The SSC will serve as host in 1996 and 1997.
- December 1, 1994 – Sunshine Network announces nine-event television package for school year.
- June 9, 1995 – Inaugural SSC Awards Luncheon held in Orlando.
- February 29, 1996 – Inaugural SSC Hall of Fame/Honors banquet held in Lakeland.
- September 30, 1996 – University of North Florida withdraws from the Sunshine State Conference, effective June 30, 1997.
- October 15, 1996 – Women's crew added to Sunshine State Conference sponsored sports.
- December 18, 1996 – Lynn University joins the Sunshine State Conference, effective July 1, 1997.
- July 15, 1998 – League adds women's soccer and women's golf as sponsored sports.
- August 24, 1999 – Saint Leo College becomes Saint Leo University and adopts new nickname ("Lions") and logo.
- July 1, 2000 – 25th Anniversary of the Sunshine State Conference.
- August 26, 2002 – Nova Southeastern University joins the Sunshine State Conference as a provisional member.
- May 26, 2004 – Don Landry announced retirement as SSC Commissioner, effective August 1, 2004. Landry remained acting commissioner through September 6, 2004.
- July 26, 2004 – Michael J. Marcil named SSC commissioner, effective September 7, 2004.
- September 14, 2009 – Jay Jones officially begins duties as the SSC commissioner, replacing Mike Marcil, who left the post June 30, 2009.
- April 7, 2010 – League adds men's and women's swimming as sponsored sport.
- July 1, 2013 – League adds men's lacrosse as sponsored sport.
- February 3, 2014 – Ed Pasque officially begins duties as the SSC commissioner, replacing Jay Jones, who left the post December 31, 2013.
- July 1, 2014 – League adds women's lacrosse as sponsored sport. – Palm Beach Atlantic University and Embry–Riddle Aeronautical University join Sunshine State Conference as provisional members; effective July 1, 2015.
- December 13, 2023 – The SSC announced the addition of three sports in 2024–25—beach volleyball, plus men's and women's outdoor track & field. The SSC will become the first conference outside NCAA Division I to officially sponsor beach volleyball.
- April 23, 2026 – Flagler College announces it will join the SSC, beginning in the 2027–28 academic year.

== Member schools ==
=== Current members ===
The SSC currently has 11 full members, all are private schools:

Institution	Location (Note: All cities are located in the State of Florida.)	Founded	Affiliation	Enrollment	Nickname	Joined (Note: Represents the calendar year when fall sports competition begins.)	Colors
Barry University	Miami Shores	1940	Catholic	6,825	Buccaneers	1988	
Eckerd College	St. Petersburg	1958	Presbyterian	1,893	Tritons	1975	
Embry–Riddle Aeronautical University	Daytona Beach	1926	Nonsectarian	11,426	Eagles	2015 (Note: The Embry–Riddle men's and women's basketball teams joined the SSC two years after becoming a full member for other sports (2017–18).)	
Florida Southern College	Lakeland	1883	United Methodist	3,211	Moccasins	1975	
Florida Institute of Technology	Melbourne	1958	Nonsectarian	8,992	Panthers	1981	
Lynn University	Boca Raton	1962	Nonsectarian	3,514	Fighting Knights	1997 (Note: The Lynn men's and women's basketball teams joined the SSC a year after becoming a full member for other sports (1998–99).)	
Nova Southeastern University	Davie	1964	Nonsectarian	20,910	Sharks	2002 (Note: The Nova Southeastern men's and women's basketball teams joined the SSC two years after becoming a full member for other sports (2004–05).)	
Palm Beach Atlantic University	West Palm Beach	1968	Christian	4,147	Sailfish	2015 (Note: The Palm Beach Atlantic men's and women's basketball teams joined the SSC a year after becoming a full member for other sports (2016–17).)	
Rollins College	Winter Park	1885	Nonsectarian	3,046	Tars	1975	
Saint Leo University	St. Leo	1889	Catholic	9,692	Lions	1975	
University of Tampa	Tampa	1931	Nonsectarian	11,433	Spartans	1981	

=== Future members ===
Institution	Location (Note: All cities are located in the State of Florida.)	Founded	Affiliation	Enrollment	Nickname	Joining (Note: Represents the calendar year when fall sports competition begins.)	Colors	Current conference
Flagler College	St. Augustine	1968	Nonsectarian	2,574	Saints	2027		Peach Belt (PBC)

=== Former members ===
The SSC had three former full members, all but one were public schools:

Institution	Location (Note: All cities were located in the State of Florida.)	Founded	Affiliation	Enrollment	Nickname	Joined (Note: Represents the calendar year when fall sports competition begins.)	Left (Note: Represents the calendar year when spring sports competition ends.)	Current conference
University of Central Florida	Orlando	1963	Public	68,571	Knights	1975	1984	Big 12 (Note: Currently an NCAA Division I athletic conference.)
University of North Florida	Jacksonville	1969	Public	16,309	Ospreys	1992 (Note: The North Florida men's and women's basketball teams joined the SSC a year after becoming a full member for other sports (1993–94).)	1997	Atlantic Sun (ASUN)
St. Thomas University	Miami Gardens	1961	Catholic (Archdiocese of Miami)	1,750	Bobcats	1975	1987	The Sun (Note: Currently an NAIA athletic conference.)

=== Membership timeline ===
Full member (all sports) Full member (non-football) Associate member (football-only) Associate member (other sports)

== Conference facilities ==
Institution	Arena	Capacity
Barry	Health and Sports Center	1,938
Embry–Riddle	ICI Center	1,968
Eckerd	McArthur Center	1,000
Florida Southern	Jenkins Field House	2,500
Florida Tech	Clemente Center	1,500
Lynn	de Hoernle Center	1,000
Nova Southeastern	Rick Case Arena at the Don Taft University Center	5,500
Palm Beach Atlantic	Rubin Arena	2,000
Rollins	Warden Arena	2,500
Saint Leo	Marion Bowman Activities Center	2,000
Tampa	Bob Martinez Sports Center	3,432

== National championships ==
Sunshine State Conference schools have won 144 NCAA Division II National Championships as of 2025-26.

=== Championships by year ===
Year	Titles	Team
1965-66	1	Rollins tennis (M)
1966-67		
1967-68		
1968-69		
1969-70	1	Rollins golf (M)
1970-71	1	Florida Southern Baseball
1971–72	2	Florida Southern Baseball • Rollins tennis (M)
1972-73		
1973-74		
1974-75	1	Florida Southern Baseball
1975-76		
1976-77		
1977–78	1	Florida Southern Baseball
1978-79		
1979-80		
1980-81	3	Florida Southern Baseball • Florida southern Basketball (M) • Florida Southern golf (M)
1981-82	2	Florida Southern golf (M) • Tampa Soccer (M)
1982–83		
1983-84		
1984-85	2	Florida Southern Baseball • Florida Southern golf (M)
1985-86	1	Florida Southern golf (M)
1986-87	1	Tampa golf (M)
1987–88	2	Florida Southern Baseball • Tampa golf (M)
1988–89	1	Florida Tech soccer (M)
1989-90	2	Florida Southern golf (M) • Barry soccer (W)
1990-91	3	Florida Southern golf (M) • Rollins tennis (M) • Rollins golf (W)
1991-92	3	Tampa Baseball • Rollins golf (W) • Florida Tech soccer (M)
1992-93	3	Tampa Baseball • Barry soccer (W) • Florida Southern softball
1993–94	3	Barry soccer (W) • North Florida tennis (W) • Rollins golf (W)
1994-95	3	Florida Southern Baseball • Florida Southern golf (M) • Tampa soccer (M)
1995-96	2	Florida Southern golf (M) • Barry Volleyball (W)
1996-97	2	Lynn tennis (W) • Lynn golf (W)
1997-98	3	Tampa Baseball • Florida Southern golf (M) • Lynn tennis (W)
1998–99	2	Florida Southern golf (M) • Lynn soccer (W)
1999-2000	2	Florida Southern golf (M) • Florida Southern golf (W)
2000–01	3	Florida Southern golf (W) • Rollins tennis (M) • Lynn tennis (W)
2001–02	4	Rollins golf (M) • Florida Southern golf (W) • Barry Volleyball (W) • Tampa soccer (M)
2002–03	1	Rollins golf (W)
2003–04	2	Rollins golf (W) • Lynn soccer (M)
2004–05	3	Florida Southern Baseball • Rollins golf (W) • Barry volleyball (W)
2005–06	2	Tampa Baseball • Rollins golf (W)
2006–07	5	Tampa Baseball • Barry golf (M) • Florida Southern golf (W) • Lynn tennis (M) • Tampa volleyball (W)
2007–08	2	Rollins golf (W) • Tampa soccer (W)
2008–09	2	Lynn baseball • Nova Southeastern golf (W)
2009–10	3	Florida Southern golf (M) • Nova Southeastern golf (W) • Barry tennis (M)
2010–11	2	Nova Southeastern golf (W) • Barry tennis (W)
2011–12	2	Nova Southeastern golf (M) • Nova Southeastern golf (W)
2012–13	6	Tampa baseball • Barry golf (M) • Lynn golf (W) • Nova Southeastern rowing • Lynn soccer (M) • Barry tennis (M)
2013–14	3	Barry golf (M) • Lynn golf (W) • Barry tennis (W)
2014–15	7	Tampa baseball • Florida Southern basketball (M) • Nova Southeastern golf (M) • Barry rowing • Lynn soccer (M) • Barry tennis (M) • Tampa volleyball
2015–16	5	Nova Southeastern baseball • Saint Leo golf (M) • Rollins golf (W) • Florida Southern lacrosse (W) • Barry rowing
2016–17	3	Barry tennis (W) • Barry golf (W) • Florida Southern golf (M)
2017–18	2	Barry tennis (W) • Lynn golf (M)
2018–19	7	Barry soccer (M) • Tampa volleyball • Florida Tech golf (W) • Lynn golf (M) • Barry tennis (M) • Barry tennis (W) • Tampa baseball
2019–20		
2020–21	2	Barry tennis (M) • Barry tennis (W)
2021–22	4	Tampa lacrosse (M) • Barry tennis (M) • Barry tennis (W) • Tampa volleyball (W)
2022–23	5	Nova Southeastern basketball (M) • Nova Southeastern golf (M) • Nova Southeastern swimming (W) • Barry tennis (M) • Barry tennis (W)
2023–24	5	Tampa baseball • Nova Southeastern swimming (W) • Tampa swimming (M) • Nova Southeastern tennis (W) • Tampa lacrosse (W)
2024–25	8	Lynn soccer (M) • Lynn volleyball (W) • Nova Southeastern swimming (W) • Nova Southeastern basketball (M) • Tampa lacrosse (W) • Barry tennis (W) • Embry-Riddle rowing (W) • Tampa baseball
2025-26	9	Florida Tech soccer (W) • Nova Southeastern swimming (W) • Tampa swimming (M) • Florida Southern golf (M) • Nova Southeastern tennis (W) • Florida Southern lacrosse (W) • Tampa lacrosse (M) • Saint Leo softball • Tampa baseball

=== Championships by school ===
School	NCAA Titles	Most Recent
Florida Southern	32	2026 — men's golf, women's lacrosse
Barry	29	2025 — women's tennis
Tampa	27	2026 — men's swimming & diving, men’s lacrosse, baseball
Nova Southeastern	17	2026 — women's swimming & diving, women's tennis
Lynn	16*	2024 — men's soccer, volleyball
Rollins	15	2016 — women's golf
Florida Tech	4	2025 — women's soccer
Saint Leo	2	2026 — softball
Embry-Riddle	1	2025 — women's rowing
North Florida	1	1994 — women's tennis
Eckerd	0	
Palm Beach Atlantic	0	

=== Controversy ===
On July 17, 2007, NCAA vacated Lynn's 2005 Women's Division II Softball Championship due to extra benefits given to two players. The NCAA found that former coach Thomas Macera gave two Lynn softball players cash payments totaling more than $3,000. Lynn was also placed on probation for two years. As of 2024-25 Lynn University has won 17 national championships at the Division II level, but now the NCAA recognizes only 16 of them because of the unsanctioned actions.

== Mayors' Cup Champions ==
The Mayors' Cup was originally presented following the 1986–1987 academic year to recognize the annual SSC all-sports champion. The men's division recognizes competition in eight sports: soccer, cross country, basketball, swimming, golf, tennis, lacrosse and baseball. The Women's Mayors' Cup recognizes competition in ten sports: volleyball, soccer, cross country, basketball, swimming, golf, tennis, lacrosse, softball and rowing.

Overall Mayors' Cup Championships by School
Men's Mayors' Cup Championships		Women's Mayors' Cup Championships	
Florida Southern	16	Florida Southern	12
Tampa	6	Tampa	9
Saint Leo	4	Rollins	6
Lynn	4	Barry	5
Florida Tech	3	Nova Southeastern	3
Barry	3	North Florida	2
Rollins	3	Saint Leo	1
North Florida	2		
Nova Southeastern	1		

Year	Men's	Women's
1987	Tampa	Florida Southern
1988	Florida Southern	Florida Southern
1989	Florida Southern; Tampa	Florida Southern
1990	Tampa	Florida Southern
1991	Tampa	Barry
1992	Florida Tech	Tampa
1993	Tampa	Tampa
1994	North Florida	North Florida
1995	North Florida	Florida Southern
1996	Florida Southern	North Florida
1997	Florida Southern	Barry
1998	Florida Southern	Florida Southern
1999	Florida Southern	Florida Southern

Year	Men's	Women's
2000	Florida Southern	Barry
2001	Florida Southern	Florida Southern
2002	Florida Southern	Barry
2003	Rollins	Rollins
2004	Rollins	Rollins
2005	Lynn	Florida Southern
2006	Lynn	Barry
2007	Barry	Florida Southern
2008	Florida Southern	Nova Southeastern
2009	Barry; Florida Southern	Rollins
2010	Rollins	Rollins
2011	Barry	Florida Southern
2012	Florida Tech; Florida Southern	Rollins

Year	Men's	Women's
2013	Saint Leo; Florida Southern	Tampa
2014	Saint Leo	Tampa
2015	Lynn	Rollins
2016	Saint Leo	Nova Southeastern
2017	Florida Tech	Saint Leo
2018	Florida Southern	Florida Southern
2019	Lynn	Tampa
2020	Not Held-Covid	Not Held-Covid
2021	Not Held-Covid	Not Held-Covid
2022	Florida Southern	Tampa
2023	Saint Leo	Tampa
2024	Nova Southeastern	Tampa
2025	Florida Southern	Tampa

Year	Men's	Women's
2026	Tampa	Nova Southeastern
2027		
2028		
2029		
2030		
2031		
2032		
2033		
2034		
2035		
2036		

== Sports ==
Conference sports
Sport	Men's	Women's
Baseball	✓	
Basketball	✓	✓
Beach volleyball		✓
Cross country	✓	✓
Golf	✓	✓
Lacrosse	✓	✓
Rowing		✓
Soccer	✓	✓
Softball		✓
Swimming & Diving	✓	✓
Tennis	✓	✓
Track & field outdoor	✓	✓
Volleyball		✓

SSC is adding Beach Volleyball, Men's Outdoor Track, and Women's Outdoor Track championships in 2024–25.

=== Men's sponsored sports by school ===
School	Baseball	Basketball	Cross country	Golf	Lacrosse	Soccer	Swimming & diving	Tennis	Track & field outdoor	Total SSC sports
Barry	✓	✓	✓	✓	✓	✓	✓	✓	✓	9
Eckerd	✓	✓	✓	✓		✓		✓		6
Embry–Riddle	✓	✓	✓	✓	✓	✓		✓	✓	8
Florida Southern	✓	✓	✓	✓	✓	✓	✓	✓	✓	9
Florida Tech	✓	✓	✓		✓	✓	✓			6
Lynn	✓	✓	✓	✓	✓	✓	✓	✓	✓	9
Nova Southeastern	✓	✓	✓		✓	✓	✓		✓	7
Palm Beach Atlantic	✓	✓	✓	✓	✓	✓		✓	✓	8
Rollins	✓	✓		✓	✓	✓	✓	✓		7
Saint Leo	✓	✓	✓	✓	✓	✓		✓	✓	8
Tampa	✓	✓	✓	✓	✓	✓	✓		✓	8
Totals	11	11	10	10	10	11	7	8	8	85
Future members
Flagler	✓	✓	✓	✓	✓	✓		✓	✓	8

=== Women's sponsored sports by school ===
School	Basketball	Beach volleyball	Cross country	Golf	Lacrosse	Rowing	Soccer	Softball	Swimming & diving	Tennis	Track & field outdoor	Volleyball	Total SSC sports
Barry	✓	✓	✓	✓	✓	✓	✓	✓	✓	✓	✓	✓	12
Eckerd	✓	✓	✓	✓			✓	✓		✓		✓	8
Embry–Riddle	✓		✓	✓	✓	✓	✓	✓		✓	✓	✓	10
Florida Southern	✓	✓	✓	✓	✓		✓	✓	✓	✓	✓	✓	11
Florida Tech	✓				✓		✓	✓	✓			✓	6
Lynn	✓		✓	✓	✓		✓	✓	✓	✓	✓	✓	10
Nova Southeastern	✓		✓	✓	✓	✓	✓	✓	✓	✓	✓	✓	11
Palm Beach Atlantic	✓	✓	✓	✓	✓		✓	✓		✓	✓	✓	10
Rollins	✓			✓	✓	✓	✓	✓	✓	✓		✓	9
Saint Leo	✓	✓	✓	✓	✓		✓	✓		✓	✓	✓	10
Tampa	✓	✓	✓	✓	✓	✓	✓	✓	✓	✓	✓	✓	12
Totals	11	6	9	10	10	5	11	11	7	10	8	11	109
Future members
Flagler	✓		✓	✓	✓		✓	✓		✓		✓	8

=== Other sponsored sports by school ===
School	Men		Women
School	Track & field indoor	Volleyball (Note: De facto Division I sport. The NCAA's top-level national championship is open to members of Divisions I and II.)	Track & field indoor
Barry		IND	
Embry–Riddle	PBC		PBC
Flagler	PBC (Note: Has not yet announced a future affiliation for this sport.)		PBC
Florida Southern	IND		IND

=== Discontinued Sports ===
Florida Tech= Football, Men's Golf, Women's Cross Country, Women's Golf, Women's Rowing

Rollins= Football, Men's Cross Country, Women's Cross Country

St. Leo= Men's Swimming, Women's Swimming

Tampa= Football, Men's Tennis, Men's Wrestling
