= NCAA Division II men's basketball tournament =

American annual college championship

- Current season, competition or edition: 2026 NCAA Division II men's basketball tournament
- Sport: Basketball
- Founded: 1957
- No. of teams: 64
- Country: NCAA Division II (USA)
- Most recent champion: Gannon (1st title) (2026)
- Most titles: Kentucky Wesleyan (8 titles)
- Broadcasters: CBS (Finals)
- Website: NCAA.com

The NCAA Division II men's basketball tournament (officially styled by the NCAA as a "Championship" instead of a "Tournament") is an annual championship tournament for colleges and universities that are members of NCAA Division II, a grouping of schools in the United States (plus one school in Canada) that are generally smaller than the higher-profile institutions grouped in Division I. The tournament, originally known as the NCAA College Division Basketball Championship, was established in 1957, immediately after the NCAA subdivided its member schools into the University Division (today's Division I) and College Division. It became the Division II championship in 1974, when the NCAA split the College Division into the limited-scholarship Division II and the non-scholarship Division III, and added the "Men's" designation in 1982 when the NCAA began sponsoring a Division II women's championship.

Like all other NCAA basketball divisions for men and women, the champion is decided in a single-elimination tournament. The Division II tournament normally involves 64 teams. The Division II tournaments for men and women differ in a major respect from those in Divisions I and III. The finals of both Division II tournaments consist of eight teams, instead of the four in the other two divisions. The eight survivors of regional play meet in the Elite Eight at a predetermined site.

Gannon is the reigning national champion, winning its first national title in 2026.

== Qualification ==
A total of 64 bids are normally available for each tournament: 23 automatic bids (awarded to the champion of each Division II all-sports conference) and 41 at-large bids. Due to COVID-19 issues, the 2020 tournament was canceled, and the 2021 tournament was reduced to 48 teams when nine all-sports conferences chose not to compete in men's basketball in 2020–21.

The bids are allocated evenly among the eight NCAA-designated regions (Atlantic, Central, East, Midwest, South, South Central, Southeast, and West), all but one of which contain three of the 23 Division II conferences that sponsor men's basketball. The South Central region contains only two conferences. Each regional tournament involves an appropriate number of automatic qualifiers (teams that won their respective conference tournaments), with the remaining participants entering via at-large bids (which are awarded regardless of conference affiliation).

=== Conference tournaments ===
Schools in italics are, as of the 2025–26 Division II basketball season, no longer members of that specific conference.

Region	Conference	Tournament	Debut	Most Championships	Current Champion (2026)
Atlantic (Note: Also includes D-II independent Salem)	CIAA	Tournament	1946	Virginia Union (17)	Fayetteville State (3rd)
Atlantic	Mountain East	Tournament	2014	West Liberty (5)	West Liberty (5th)
Atlantic	PSAC	Tournament	1981	Cheyney (15)	California (PA) (9th)
Central	Great American	Tournament	2012	Arkansas Tech (3); Harding (3)	Harding (3rd)
Central	MIAA	Tournament	1981	NW Missouri State (12)	Washburn (6th)
Central	NSIC	Tournament	2010	Northern State (SD) (6)	Minnesota–Duluth (3rd)
East	CACC	Tournament	2002	Bloomfield (6); Jefferson (6)	Felician (3rd)
East	East Coast	Tournament	1990	St. Thomas Aquinas (8)	Daemen (2nd)
East	Northeast-10	Tournament	1981	Saint Anselm (11)	Saint Anselm (11th)
Midwest	GLIAC	Tournament	1991	Findlay (8)	Grand Valley State (7th)
Midwest	GLVC	Tournament	1981	Bellarmine (5); Kentucky Wesleyan (5)	William Jewell (2nd)
Midwest	G-MAC	Tournament	2013	Walsh (5)	Walsh (5th)
South (Note: Also includes D-II independents UPR Bayamón, UPR Mayagüez, and UPR Río Piedras)	Gulf South	Tournament	1981	Alabama–Huntsville (6); Delta State (6); North Alabama (6)	West Florida (2nd)
South	SIAC	Tournament	1934	Florida A&M (12)	Morehouse (7th)
South	Sunshine State	Tournament	1978	Florida Southern (25)	Nova Southeastern (5th)
South Central	Lone Star	Tournament	1975	West Texas A&M (12)	Dallas Baptist (2nd)
South Central	RMAC	Tournament	1993	MSU Denver (11)	Black Hills State (2nd)
Southeast	Carolinas	Tournament	1936	High Point (12)	Young Harris (1st)
Southeast	Peach Belt	Tournament	1992	Augusta (7)	Lander (6th)
Southeast	SAC	Tournament	1992	Catawba (9)	Anderson (SC) (1st)
West	CCAA	Tournament	1986	Cal State Bakersfield (5); UC San Diego (5)	Cal State East Bay (1st)
West	GNAC	Tournament	2011	Seattle Pacific (5)	Saint Martin's (1st)
West	Pacific West	Tournament	2013	Point Loma (5)	Point Loma (5th)

== Results ==
NCAA Division II Men's Basketball Championship
Year	Finals Site	Host Arena	# Teams	Championship Game			Tournament MVP/MOP	Ref
Year	Finals Site	Host Arena	# Teams	Winner	Score	Runner-up	Tournament MVP/MOP	Ref
1957	Evansville, IN	Roberts Municipal Stadium	32	Wheaton (IL)	89–65	Kentucky Wesleyan	Mel Peterson (Wheaton)	
1958	Evansville, IN	Roberts Municipal Stadium	32	South Dakota	75–53	St. Michael's	Ed Smallwood (Evansville)	
1959	Evansville, IN	Roberts Municipal Stadium	32	Evansville	83–67	Southwest Missouri State	Hugh Ahlering (Evansville)	
1960	Evansville, IN	Roberts Municipal Stadium	32	Evansville (2)	90–69	Chapman	Ed Smallwood (Evansville)	
1961	Evansville, IN	Roberts Municipal Stadium	32	Wittenberg	42–38	Southeast Missouri State	Don Jacobson (South Dakota State)	
1962	Evansville, IN	Roberts Municipal Stadium	32	Mount St. Mary's	58–57 (OT)	Sacramento State	Ron Rohrer (Sacramento State)	
1963	Evansville, IN	Roberts Municipal Stadium	32	South Dakota State	44–42	Wittenberg	Wayne Rasmussen (South Dakota State)	
1964	Evansville, IN	Roberts Municipal Stadium	32	Evansville (3)	72–59	Akron	Jerry Sloan (Evansville)	
1965	Evansville, IN	Roberts Municipal Stadium	32	Evansville (4)	85–82 (OT)	Southern Illinois	Jerry Sloan (Evansville)	
1966	Evansville, IN	Roberts Municipal Stadium	36	Kentucky Wesleyan	54–51	Southern Illinois	Sam Smith (Kentucky Wesleyan)	
1967	Evansville, IN	Roberts Municipal Stadium	36	Winston-Salem State	77–74	Southwest Missouri State	Earl Monroe (Winston-Salem State)	
1968	Evansville, IN	Roberts Municipal Stadium	36	Kentucky Wesleyan (2)	63–52	Indiana State	Jerry Newsom (Indiana State)	
1969	Evansville, IN	Roberts Municipal Stadium	32	Kentucky Wesleyan (3)	75–71	Southwest Missouri State	George Tinsley (Kentucky Wesleyan)	
1970	Evansville, IN	Roberts Municipal Stadium	32	Philadelphia Textile	76–65	Tennessee State	Ted McClain (Tennessee State)	
1971	Evansville, IN	Roberts Municipal Stadium	32	Evansville (5)	97–82	Old Dominion	Don Buse (Evansville)	
1972	Evansville, IN	Roberts Municipal Stadium	36	Roanoke	84–72	Akron	Hal Johnston (Roanoke)	
1973	Evansville, IN	Roberts Municipal Stadium	42	Kentucky Wesleyan (4)	78–76	Tennessee State	Mike Williams (Kentucky Wesleyan)	
1974	Evansville, IN	Roberts Municipal Stadium	44	Morgan State	67–52	Southwest Missouri State	Marvin Webster (Morgan State)	
1975	Evansville, IN	Roberts Municipal Stadium	32	Old Dominion	76–74	New Orleans	Wilson Washington (Old Dominion)	
1976	Evansville, IN	Roberts Municipal Stadium	32	Puget Sound	83–74	Chattanooga	Curt Peterson (Puget Sound)	
1977	Springfield, MA	Springfield Civic Center	32	Chattanooga	71–62	Randolph–Macon	Wayne Golden (Chattanooga)	
1978	Springfield, MO	Hammons Student Center	32	Cheyney State	47–40	Wisconsin–Green Bay	Andrew Fields (Cheyney)	
1979	Springfield, MO	Hammons Student Center	32	North Alabama	64–50	Wisconsin–Green Bay	Perry Oden (North Alabama)	
1980	Springfield, MA	Springfield Civic Center	32	Virginia Union	80–74	New York Tech	Keith Valentine (Virginia Union)	
1981	Springfield, MA	Springfield Civic Center	32	Florida Southern	73–68	Mount St. Mary's	John Ebeling (Florida Southern)	
1982	Springfield, MA	Springfield Civic Center	32	District of Columbia	73–63	Florida Southern	Michael Britt (District of Columbia)	
1983	Springfield, MA	Springfield Civic Center	32	Wright State	92–73	District of Columbia	Gary Monroe (Wright State)	
1984	Springfield, MA	Springfield Civic Center	32	Central Missouri State	81–77	St. Augustine's	Ron Nunnelly (Central Missouri)	
1985	Springfield, MA	Springfield Civic Center	32	Jacksonville State	74–73	South Dakota State	Mark Tetzlaff (South Dakota State)	
1986	Springfield, MA	Springfield Civic Center	32	Sacred Heart	93–87	Southeast Missouri State	Roger Younger (Sacred Heart)	
1987	Springfield, MA	Springfield Civic Center	32	Kentucky Wesleyan (5)	92–74	Gannon	Sam Smith (Kentucky Wesleyan)	
1988	Springfield, MA	Springfield Civic Center	32	Lowell	75–72	Alaska–Anchorage	Leo Parent (Lowell)	
1989	Springfield, MA	Springfield Civic Center	32	North Carolina Central	73–46	Southeast Missouri State	Miles Clarke (North Carolina Central)	
1990	Springfield, MA	Springfield Civic Center	32	Kentucky Wesleyan (6)	93–79	CSU Bakersfield	Wade Green (CSU Bakersfield)	
1991	Springfield, MA	Springfield Civic Center	32	North Alabama (2)	79–72	Bridgeport	Lambert Shell (Bridgeport)	
1992	Springfield, MA	Springfield Civic Center	32	Virginia Union (2)	100–75	Bridgeport	Derrick Johnson (Virginia Union)	
1993	Springfield, MA	Springfield Civic Center	32	CSU Bakersfield	85–72	Troy State	Tyrone Davis (CSU Bakersfield)	
1994	Springfield, MA	Springfield Civic Center	48	CSU Bakersfield (2)	92–86	Southern Indiana	Stan Gouard (Southern Indiana)	
1995	Louisville, KY	Commonwealth Convention Center	48	Southern Indiana	71–63	UC Riverside	William Wilson (UC Riverside)	
1996	Louisville, KY	Commonwealth Convention Center	48	Fort Hays State	70–63	Northern Kentucky	Sherick Simpson (Fort Hays State)	
1997	Louisville, KY	Commonwealth Convention Center	48	CSU Bakersfield (3)	57–56	Northern Kentucky	Kebu Stewart (CSU Bakersfield)	
1998	Louisville, KY	Commonwealth Convention Center	48	UC Davis	83–77	Kentucky Wesleyan	Antonio Garcia (Kentucky Wesleyan)	
1999	Louisville, KY	Commonwealth Convention Center	48	Kentucky Wesleyan (7)	75–60	Metro State	Antonio Garcia (Kentucky Wesleyan)	
2000	Louisville, KY	Commonwealth Convention Center	48	Metro State	97–79	Kentucky Wesleyan	DeMarcos Anzures (Metro State)	
2001	Bakersfield, CA	Rabobank Arena	48	Kentucky Wesleyan (8)	72–63	Washburn	Lorio Duncan (Kentucky Wesleyan)	
2002	Evansville, IN	Roberts Municipal Stadium	48	Metro State (2)	80–72	Kentucky Wesleyan	Patrick Mutombo (Metro State)	
2003	Lakeland, FL	Lakeland Center	64	Northeastern State	75–64	Kentucky Wesleyan (Note: Kentucky Wesleyan subsequently forfeited its 2003 runner-up status after it was revealed they had let two ineligible transfer players play.)	Darnell Hinson (Northeastern State)	
2004	Bakersfield, CA	Rabobank Arena	64	Kennesaw State	84–59	Southern Indiana	Terrence Hill (Kennesaw State)	
2005	Grand Forks, ND	Ralph Engelstad Arena	64	Virginia Union (3)	63–58	Bryant	Antwan Walton (Virginia Union)	
2006	Springfield, MA	MassMutual Center	64	Winona State	73–61	Virginia Union	John Smith (Winona State)	
2007	Springfield, MA	MassMutual Center	64	Barton	77–75	Winona State	Anthony Atkinson (Barton)	
2008	Springfield, MA	MassMutual Center	64	Winona State (2)	87–76	Augusta State	Jonte Flowers (Winona State)	
2009	Springfield, MA	MassMutual Center	64	Findlay	56–53 (OT)	Cal Poly Pomona	Josh Bostic (Findlay)	
2010	Springfield, MA	MassMutual Center	64	Cal Poly Pomona	65–53	Indiana (PA)	Austin Swift (Cal Poly Pomona)	
2011	Springfield, MA	MassMutual Center	64	Bellarmine	71–68	BYU–Hawaii	Jet Chang (BYU–Hawaii)	
2012	Highland Heights, KY	The Bank of Kentucky Center	64	Western Washington	72–65	Montevallo	D. J. Rivera (Montevallo)	
2013	Atlanta, GA (Note: Philips Arena in Atlanta, now known as State Farm Arena, was the site of the championship game only. The rest of the Elite Eight was played at Freedom Hall in Louisville, Kentucky.)	Philips Arena	64	Drury	74–73	Metro State	Alex Hall (Drury)	
2014	Evansville, IN	Ford Center	64	Central Missouri (2)	84–77	West Liberty	Daylen Robinson (Central Missouri)	
2015	Evansville, IN	Ford Center	64	Florida Southern (2)	77–62	Indiana (PA)	Kevin Capers (Florida Southern)	
2016	Frisco, TX	Dr Pepper Arena	64	Augustana (SD)	90–81	Lincoln Memorial	Alex Richter (Augustana (SD))	
2017	Sioux Falls, SD	Sanford Pentagon	64	Northwest Missouri State	71–61	Fairmont State	Justin Pitts (Northwest Missouri State)	
2018	Sioux Falls, SD	Sanford Pentagon	64	Ferris State	71–69	Northern State	Zach Hankins (Ferris State)	
2019	Evansville, IN	Ford Center	64	Northwest Missouri State (2)	64–58	Point Loma	Trevor Hudgins (Northwest Missouri State)	
2020	Atlanta, GA (Note: State Farm Arena was scheduled as the site of the championship game only. The Elite Eight quarterfinals and semifinals would have been played at the Ford Center in Evansville, Indiana.)	State Farm Arena	64	Canceled due to the COVID-19 pandemic				
2021	Evansville, IN	Ford Center	48	Northwest Missouri State (3)	80–54	West Texas A&M	Ryan Hawkins (Northwest Missouri State)	
2022	Evansville, IN	Ford Center	64	Northwest Missouri State (4)	67–58	Augusta	Trevor Hudgins (Northwest Missouri State)	
2023	Evansville, IN	Ford Center	64	Nova Southeastern	111–101	West Liberty	Will Yoakum & RJ Sunahara (Nova Southeastern)	
2024	Evansville, IN	Ford Center	64	Minnesota State	88–85	Nova Southeastern	Malik Willingham (Minnesota State)	
2025	Evansville, IN	Ford Center	64	Nova Southeastern (2)	74–73	Cal State Dominguez Hills	MJ Iraldi (Nova Southeastern)	
2026	Indianapolis, IN (Note: Gainbridge Fieldhouse will be the site of the championship game only. The Elite Eight quarterfinals and semifinals will be held at UPMC Cooper Fieldhouse in Pittsburgh.)	Gainbridge Fieldhouse	64	Gannon	84–61	Lander	Pace Prosser (Gannon)	

== Records and statistics ==
=== Championships by school ===
Active programs

School	Titles	Years
Kentucky Wesleyan	8	1966, 1968, 1969, 1973, 1987, 1990, 1999, 2001
NW Missouri State	4	2017, 2019, 2021, 2022
Virginia Union	3	1980, 1992, 2005
Nova Southeastern	2	2023, 2025
Florida Southern	2	1981, 2015
Central Missouri	2	1984, 2014
Winona State	2	2006, 2008
MSU Denver (Note: Championships won as Metro State.)	2	2000, 2002
Gannon	1	2026
Minnesota State	1	2024
Ferris State	1	2018
Augustana (SD)	1	2016
Drury	1	2013
Western Washington	1	2012
Cal Poly Pomona	1	2010
Findlay	1	2009
Barton	1	2007
Northeastern State	1	2003
Fort Hays State	1	1996
District of Columbia	1	1982
Jefferson (Note: Championship won as Philadelphia Textile.)	1	1970
Winston-Salem State	1	1967

Former programs

School	Titles	Years
Evansville	5	1959, 1960, 1964, 1965, 1971
Cal State Bakersfield	3	1993, 1994, 1997
North Alabama	2	1979, 1991
Bellarmine	1	2011
Kennesaw State	1	2004
UC Davis	1	1998
Southern Indiana	1	1995
North Carolina Central	1	1989
UMass Lowell (Note: Championship won as Lowell.)	1	1988
Sacred Heart	1	1986
Jacksonville State	1	1985
Wright State	1	1983
Cheyney	1	1978
Chattanooga (Note: Championship won as Tennessee–Chattanooga.)	1	1977
Puget Sound	1	1976
Old Dominion	1	1975
Morgan State	1	1974
Roanoke	1	1972
South Dakota State	1	1963
Mount Saint Mary's	1	1962
Wittenberg	1	1961
South Dakota	1	1958
Wheaton (IL)	1	1957

=== Team appearances ===
Schools that have won the NCAA Division II Men's Basketball Championship
8, 5, 4, 3, 2, 1

== Former Division II champions now in other classes ==
=== Division I ===
School	Championship(s)	Year moved	Current conference
South Dakota	1958	2006	The Summit League
Evansville	1959 • 1960 • 1964 • 1965 • 1971	1977	Missouri Valley Conference
Mount St. Mary's	1962	1989	Metro Atlantic Athletic Conference
South Dakota State	1963	2005	The Summit League
Morgan State	1974	1985	Mid-Eastern Athletic Conference
Old Dominion	1975	1976	Sun Belt Conference
Chattanooga	1977	1977	Southern Conference
North Alabama	1979 • 1991	2018	Atlantic Sun Conference (United Athletic Conference in 2026)
Wright State	1983	1988	Horizon League
Jacksonville State	1985	1996	Conference USA
Sacred Heart	1986	1999	Metro Atlantic Athletic Conference
UMass Lowell	1988	2013	America East Conference
North Carolina Central	1989	2008	Mid-Eastern Athletic Conference
Bakersfield	1993 • 1994 • 1997	2007	Big West Conference
Southern Indiana	1995	2022	Ohio Valley Conference
UC Davis	1998	2004	Big West Conference (Mountain West Conference in 2026)
Kennesaw State	2004	2006	Conference USA
Bellarmine	2011	2020	Atlantic Sun Conference

=== Division III ===
School	Championship(s)	Year moved	Current Conference
Wheaton (IL)	1957	1974	College Conference of Illinois and Wisconsin
Wittenberg	1961	1974	North Coast Athletic Conference
Roanoke	1972	1976	Old Dominion Athletic Conference
Puget Sound	1976	1996	Northwest Conference

== Broadcasting ==
CBS Sports holds rights to the semi-final and final rounds of the Division II tournament, with the semi-final games broadcast on CBS Sports Network and the final on CBS (covered as part of the NCAA March Madness package). In 2015, CBS Sports reached a long-term deal to continue broadcasting the Division II men's semi-final on CBS Sports Network through 2024.

== See also ==
- NCAA Division II women's basketball tournament
- NCAA Division I men's basketball tournament
- NCAA Division III men's basketball tournament
- NAIA men's basketball tournament
