= Trevor Hudgins =

American basketball player

- Hudgins with PAOK Thessaloniki in 2026

No. 12 – PAOK Thessaloniki
- Position: Point guard
- League: GBL; EuroCup

Personal information
- Born: March 23, 1999 (age 27) Manhattan, Kansas, U.S.
- Listed height: 5 ft 11 in (1.80 m)
- Listed weight: 180 lb (82 kg)

Career information
- High school: Manhattan (Manhattan, Kansas)
- College: Northwest Missouri State (2018–2022)
- NBA draft: 2022: undrafted
- Playing career: 2022–present

Career history
- 2022–2023: Houston Rockets
- 2022–2023: →Rio Grande Valley Vipers
- 2023–2026: Le Mans
- 2026–present: PAOK Thessaloniki

Career highlights
- 2× All-LNB Élite Second Team (2025, 2026); French League Cup winner (2025); French League Cup MVP (2025); 3× NCAA Division II champion (2019, 2021, 2022); 2× NCAA Division II Tournament MOP (2019, 2022); 2× NABC Division II Player of the Year (2021, 2022); Bevo Francis Award winner (2022); 2× First-team Division II All-American – NABC, D2CCA (2021, 2022); 3× MIAA Player of the Year (2020–2022); 4× First-team All-MIAA (2019–2022); MIAA Freshman of the Year (2019)
- Stats at NBA.com
- Stats at Basketball Reference

Trevor Hudgins (born March 23, 1999) is an American professional basketball player for PAOK Thessaloniki of the Greek Basketball League (GBL) and the EuroCup. He played college basketball for the Northwest Missouri State Bearcats where he led the team to three consecutive NCAA Division II championships. Hudgins was named as the NABC Division II Player of the Year in 2021 and 2022 and the Mid-America Intercollegiate Athletics Association (MIAA) Player of the Year from 2020 to 2022, making him one of the most decorated players in NCAA Division II history.

Hudgins started his professional career during the 2022–23 season with the Houston Rockets of the National Basketball Association (NBA), on a two-way contract with the Rio Grande Valley Vipers of the NBA G League. He joined Le Mans in 2023.

== Early life ==
Hudgins is the son of Sterling and Pat Hudgins. His father is a pastor. Hudgins had his beginnings in basketball by playing with a ball when he was old enough to walk. He also participated in football, soccer, bowling, golf and pool while growing up.

== High school career ==
Hudgins attended Manhattan High School in his hometown of Manhattan, Kansas. The basketball team's head coach was relieved of his duties during Hudgins' freshman season and replaced by Benji George. George allowed Hudgins to play on the varsity team during the latter half of the season and recognised that he would take over the team's point guard position with his distribution abilities. In his sophomore season, Hudgins helped the team improve to a 18–3 record and a championship in the Centennial League. He had played with a pass-first approach and shunned scoring until encouraged by the coaching staff. Hudgins led the team to a second Centennial League title as a junior and was named the conference's player of the year. He earned a second consecutive conference player of the year award as he led the team to a third Centennial League title in his senior season.

=== College recruiting ===
Hudgins received no NCAA Division I offers. He was noticed by Northwest Missouri State head coach Ben McCollum at an Amateur Athletic Union tournament game in Lawrence, Kansas, in July 2016. McCollum later travelled to Manhattan to watch Hudgins play pickup basketball at the Ahearn Field House and was satisfied by his aggression; Hudgins received an offer to Northwest the next day. Hudgins made two trips to the Northwest Missouri State campus and committed to the program after the team won its first national title in March 2017.

== College career ==
=== 2017–2018: Redshirt season ===
Hudgins redshirted during the 2017–18 season; his decision was due to the feeling that he did not live up to expectations during team practices and he spent time conditioning himself to replace senior Justin Pitts as the Bearcats' starting point guard.

=== 2018–2019: Collegiate debut and first championship ===
Hudgins made his collegiate debut on November 4, 2018, against the Northern State Wolves and scored a team-high 25 points. Hudgins finished the season with averages of 18.7 points, 5.3 assists and 2.3 rebounds per game. His 203 assists broke the Bearcats' single-season assist record. Hudgins helped lead the Bearcats to a 38–0 record and was selected as the Freshman of the Year in the Mid-America Intercollegiate Athletics Association (MIAA) while also earning first-team all-MIAA honors. The Bearcats defeated the Point Loma Nazarene Sea Lions in the championship game of the 2019 NCAA Division II men's basketball tournament with Hudgins scoring 12 points and a game-high six assists. He was named the Division II Elite Eight Most Outstanding Player.

=== 2019–2020: Postseason cancelled ===
Hudgins desired to become a greater offensive threat during his redshirt sophomore season of 2019–20. He averaged 19.6 points and 6 assists per game as he helped the Bearcats to achieve a 31–1 record. The Bearcats won the MIAA tournament for the second consecutive year and were poised to be the No. 1 seed in the 2020 NCAA Division II men's basketball tournament until its cancellation due to the COVID-19 pandemic. Hudgins was honored as the MIAA Player of the Year and selected to the All-MIAA First-Team. He was selected as a finalist for the Bevo Francis Award alongside teammate Ryan Hawkins.

=== 2020–2021: National prominence and second championship ===
Hudgins averaged 19.8 points and 4.6 assists during the 2020–21 season; his 3.16 assist-to-turnover ratio was second-best amongst all National Collegiate Athletic Association (NCAA) players. The Bearcats achieved a 28–2 record and defeated the West Texas A&M Buffaloes in the 2021 NCAA Division II men's basketball tournament for Hudgins to win his second national championship. He was selected as the MIAA Player of the Year for a second consecutive season and chosen to the All-MIAA First Team for a third straight year.

Hudgins did not consider transferring and elected to return to the Bearcats for his senior year during the 2021–22 season. He said of his decision: "My coach (Ben McCollum) took a chance on me when not a lot of teams did. He believed in me and that's my reason for going back to try and win another national championship." He was an early entrant for the 2021 NBA draft but withdrew before it took place.

=== 2021–2022: Final season and third championship ===
The Bearcats won the 2022 MIAA Tournament title by defeating Washburn; Hudgins scored 35 points and was selected as the MIAA Tournament Most Outstanding Player. The Bearcats defeated Augusta in the NCAA Division II championship game on March 26, 2022, to win a third consecutive national championship. Hudgins scored 31 points and became the all-time leader scoring in MIAA history. He earned the NABC Division II Player of the Year award for a second consecutive season. He won the 2022 Bevo Francis Award for the best small college basketball player and became the second Northwest Missouri State player to earn the award after Justin Pitts.

Hudgins declared for the 2022 NBA draft. He had another year of eligibility available for the 2022–23 season but he planned to graduate and begin his professional career in 2022. Hudgins' strengths in deep range shooting, ability to shoot off the dribble and proficient playing style earned him attention from National Basketball Association (NBA) scouts and a strong senior year was expected to put him in contention for NBA workouts after he graduated. He left Northwest Missouri State as the most decorated player in Division II history. McCollum called Hudgins "the best player in Division II history."

== Professional career ==
=== Houston Rockets (2022–2023) ===
Hudgins worked out for the Brooklyn Nets and Houston Rockets prior to the 2022 NBA draft. After going undrafted, he signed a two-way contract with the Rockets on July 1 and became the first player from Northwest Missouri State to sign an NBA contract. Hudgins played for the Rockets in the 2022 NBA Summer League and averaged 5.4 points per game. He made his regular season debut for the Rockets on October 22, 2022, as he scored 3 points in a loss to the Milwaukee Bucks. Hudgins made four other appearances in a three-week stretch in February 2023 due to starters Kevin Porter Jr. and Jalen Green being out of the line-up. He averaged 1.8 points and .6 assists in 5 games with the Rockets. Hudgins primarily spent his rookie season with the Rio Grande Valley Vipers of the NBA G League where he averaged 20 points, 6.1 assists and 2.5 rebounds per game.

On July 2, 2023, Hudgins signed a second two-way contract with the Rockets, but was waived on October 23.

=== Le Mans (2023–2026) ===
On November 7, 2023, Hudgins signed with Le Mans of the LNB Pro A to replace Nate Mason. He averaged 12.6 points and 2.9 assists per game during the 2023–24 season.

Hudgins played for the Los Angeles Clippers during the 2024 NBA Summer League.

On July 22, 2024, Hudgins re-signed with Le Mans for the 2024–25 season. He averaged 16.0 points, 1.8 rebounds and 2.9 assists and was selected to the All-LNB Élite Second Team.

Hudgins was selected to the All-LNB Élite Second Team for a second consecutive season in 2026 after he averaged 15.7 points and 3.9 assists per game.

=== PAOK Thessaloniki (2026–present) ===
On June 8, 2026, Hudgins signed with PAOK Thessaloniki of the Greek Basketball League (GBL) on a two-year contract.

== Career statistics ==
Legend
GP	Games played	GS	Games started	MPG	Minutes per game
FG%	Field goal percentage	3P%	3-point field goal percentage	FT%	Free throw percentage
RPG	Rebounds per game	APG	Assists per game	SPG	Steals per game
BPG	Blocks per game	PPG	Points per game	**Bold**	Career high

=== NBA ===
Year	Team	GP	GS	MPG	FG%	3P%	FT%	RPG	APG	SPG	BPG	PPG
2022–23	Houston	5	0	5.6	.222	.250	1.000	.0	.6	.0	.0	1.8
Career		5	0	5.6	.222	.250	1.000	.0	.6	.0	.0	1.8

=== College ===
Year	Team	GP	GS	MPG	FG%	3P%	FT%	RPG	APG	SPG	BPG	PPG
2017–18	Northwest Missouri State	Redshirt										
2018–19	Northwest Missouri State	38	38	34.1	.529	.459	.832	2.3	5.3	1.3	.1	18.7
2019–20	Northwest Missouri State	32	32	36.4	.533	**.533**	.868	**2.8**	**6.0**	**1.5**	.1	19.6
2020–21	Northwest Missouri State	30	30	37.1	**.542**	.508	**.901**	2.4	4.6	1.3	.1	19.8
2021–22	Northwest Missouri State	**39**	**39**	**37.7**	.482	.415	**.901**	2.4	4.3	**1.5**	**.2**	**23.0**
Career		139	139	36.3	.517	.465	.878	2.5	5.0	1.4	.1	20.4
