= 2021 NCAA Division II men's basketball tournament =

- Teams: 48
- Finals site: Ford Center, Evansville, Indiana
- Champions: Northwest Missouri State Bearcats (3rd title)
- Runner-up: West Texas A&M Buffaloes (1st title game)
- Semifinalists: Flagler Saints (1st Final Four); Lincoln Memorial Railsplitters (3rd Final Four)
- Winning coach: Ben McCollum (3rd title)
- MOP: Ryan Hawkins (NW Missouri State)

The 2021 NCAA Division II men's basketball tournament was an annual single-elimination tournament to determine the national champion of men's NCAA Division II college basketball in the United States. The championship games were held March 24–27, 2021 at the Ford Center in Evansville, Indiana, without fans.

Defending champions Northwest Missouri State defeated West Texas A&M in the championship game, 80–54, to claim the Bearcats' second consecutive and third overall Division II national title.

Biola, Flagler, Fresno Pacific, Lee, Malone, Northwest Nazarene, Nyack, Oklahoma Baptist, and Southern Arkansas qualified for the Division II tournament for the first time.

2021 NCAA Division II Men's sites - regionals (cyan) Elite Eight (red)

== Qualification ==
A total of 48 bids were available for the tournament: 16 automatic (awarded to the champions of the sixteen Division II conferences that crowned a basketball champion after the end of the regular season) and 32 at-large.

The field size was temporarily reduced for just the 2021 championship to account for teams and conferences that chose to not compete during the 2020–21 season due to the COVID-19 pandemic.

Teams from four conferences (CCAA, CIAA, Northeast-10, and Sunshine State) did not participate in the regular season or the tournament.

The remaining bids were allocated evenly among the eight NCAA-designated regions (Atlantic, Central, East, Midwest, South, South Central, Southeast, and West). Some conferences, however, were shifted from their traditional region to ensure an even distribution of teams across all eight regions. Each region consisted of two automatic qualifiers (the teams who won their respective conference tournaments) and at-large bids.

=== Automatic bids (16) ===
Region	Conference	Qualifying school	Record	Appearance	Last bid
Atlantic	CIAA	Season not played			
Atlantic	Mountain East	Fairmont State	15–4	11th	2019
Atlantic	G-MAC*	Malone	17–6	1st	—
Atlantic	PSAC	Season not played			
Central	MIAA	Washburn	19–6	15th	2019
Central	Northern Sun	Northern State	18–1	12th	2019
East	CACC	Bloomfield	6–3	9th	2018
East	East Coast	St. Thomas Aquinas	13–1	5th	2019
East	Northeast-10	Season not played			
Midwest	GLIAC	Ashland	14–8	10th	2019
Midwest	GLVC	Lewis	14–9	17th	2019
South	Gulf South	Valdosta State	17–4	12th	2019
South	Peach Belt*	Flagler	15–2	1st	—
South	SIAC	Season not played			
South	Sunshine State	Season not played			
South Central	Great American*	Arkansas–Monticello	16–4	3rd	2017
South Central	Lone Star	Lubbock Christian	17–2	3rd	2019
Southeast	Carolinas	Belmont Abbey	18–4	7th	2013
Southeast	South Atlantic	Carson-Newman	16–5	5th	2018
West	CCAA	Season not played			
West	GNAC	Season not played			
West	PacWest	Biola	9–3	1st	—
West	RMAC*	Colorado Mesa	21–1	7th	2011

*Conference moved out of its usual region for logistics.

=== At-large bids (32) ===
Qualifying school	Record	Conference	Appearance	Last bid
Alabama Huntsville	14–3	Gulf South	13th	2019
Caldwell	5–4	Central Atlantic	2nd	2007
Charleston (WV)	14–3	Mountain East	7th	2014
Colorado Mines	16–2	RMAC	10th	2019
Daemen	8–5	East Coast	2nd	2019
Dallas Baptist	16–4	Lone Star	5th	2019
Dominican (NY)	4–3	East Coast	3rd	2019
Emmanuel	15–6	Carolinas	2nd	2019
Fresno Pacific	11–4	PacWest	1st	—
Georgia Southwestern	13–5	Peach Belt	3rd	2014
Hillsdale	20–2	G-MAC	6th	2018
Lee	14–5	Gulf South	1st	—
Lincoln Memorial	16–3	South Atlantic	8th	2018
Mercyhurst	11–0	PSAC	4th	2019
Michigan Tech	14–7	GLIAC	10th	2015
MSU Moorhead	10–4	Northern Sun	6th	2017
Missouri Western	14–10	MIAA	11th	2010
Northwest Missouri State	23–2	MIAA	20th	2019
Northwest Nazarene	11–4	GNAC	1st	—
Nyack	4–4	Central Atlantic	1st	—
Oklahoma Baptist	15–5	Great American	1st	—
Point Loma Nazarene	8–2	PacWest	3rd	2019
Queens (NC)	16–5	South Atlantic	12th	2019
Southern Arkansas	15–5	Great American	1st	—
Southern Indiana	11–4	GLVC	28th	2019
Truman	18–2	GLVC	9th	2018
Tusculum	13–5	South Atlantic	3rd	2009
Wayne State (NE)	11–6	Northern Sun	3rd	2000
Wayne State (MI)	12–6	GLIAC	13th	2013
West Georgia	13–7	Gulf South	17th	2016
West Liberty	15–4	Mountain East	12th	2019
West Texas A&M	15–2	Lone Star	17th	2019

== Bracket ==
=== Atlantic Regional ===
- Site: West Liberty, West Virginia (West Liberty)

First round March 13, 2021
4	Mercyhurst	62
5	Fairmont State	58
3	West Liberty	94
6	Malone	89

Regional semifinals March 14, 2021
1	Hillsdale	67
4	Mercyhurst	48
2	Charleston (WV)	63
3	West Liberty	82

Regional Finals; March 16, 2021
1	Hillsdale	61
3	West Liberty	78

=== Central Regional ===
- Site: Aberdeen, South Dakota (Northern State)

First round March 13, 2021
4	Wayne State (NE)	72
5	MSU Moorhead	84
3	Washburn	72
6	Missouri Western	46

Regional semifinals March 14, 2021
1	Northern State	77
5	MSU Moorhead	65
2	NW Missouri State	85
3	Washburn	44

Regional Finals; March 16, 2021
1	Northern State	86
2	NW Missouri State	91*

=== East Regional ===
- Site: Albany, New York (Saint Rose)

First round March 13, 2021
4	Dominican (NY)	62
5	Caldwell	65
3	Bloomfield	71
6	Nyack	58

Regional semifinals March 14, 2021
1	St. Thomas Aquinas	95
5	Caldwell	72
2	Daemen	81
3	Bloomfield	69

Regional Finals; March 16, 2021
1	St. Thomas Aquinas	70
2	Daemen	71

=== Midwest Regional ===
- Site: Evansville, Indiana (Southern Indiana)

First round March 13, 2021
4	Wayne State (MI)	61
5	Ashland	76
3	Southern Indiana	62
6	Lewis	60

Regional semifinals March 14, 2021
1	Truman	82
5	Ashland	63
2	Michigan Tech	81
3	Southern Indiana	69

Regional Finals; March 16, 2021
1	Truman	65
2	Michigan Tech	62

=== South Regional ===
- Site: Valdosta, Georgia (Valdosta State)

First round March 13, 2021
4	Valdosta State	75
5	West Georgia	79
3	Lee	72
6	Georgia Southwestern	69

Regional semifinals March 14, 2021
1	Flagler	69
5	West Georgia	53
2	Alabama Huntsville	73
3	Lee	66

Regional Finals; March 16, 2021
1	Flagler	89
2	Alabama Huntsville	75

=== Southeast Regional ===
- Site: Harrogate, Tennessee (Lincoln Memorial)

First round March 13, 2021
4	Emmanuel	80
5	Queens (NC)	78
3	Carson-Newman	63
6	Tusculum	65*

Regional semifinals March 14, 2021
1	Belmont Abbey	53
4	Emmanuel	76
2	Lincoln Memorial	80
6	Tusculum	66

Regional Finals; March 16, 2021
4	Emmanuel	67
2	Lincoln Memorial	103

=== South Central Regional ===
- Site: Lubbock, Texas (Lubbock Christian)

First round March 13, 2021
4	Southern Arkansas	61
5	Dallas Baptist	83
3	Arkansas–Monticello	57
6	Oklahoma Baptist	76

Regional semifinals March 14, 2021
1	West Texas A&M	82
5	Dallas Baptist	65
2	Lubbock Christian	79
6	Oklahoma Baptist	55

Regional Finals; March 16, 2021
1	West Texas A&M	101
2	Lubbock Christian	92

=== West Regional ===
- Site: Golden, Colorado (Colorado Mines)

First round March 12, 2021
4	Point Loma	73
5	Northwest Nazarene	85
3	Biola	76
6	Fresno Pacific	74

Regional semifinals March 13, 2021
1	Colorado Mesa	54
5	Northwest Nazarene	74
2	Colorado Mines	83
3	Biola	52

Regional Finals; March 15, 2021
5	Northwest Nazarene	52
2	Colorado Mines	84

=== Elite Eight ===
- Site: Ford Center, Evansville, Indiana

Elite Eight; March 24, 2021
1	West Texas A&M	97
8	Daemen	83
5	Colorado Mines	76
4	Lincoln Memorial	90
3	Flagler	70
6	Truman	69
7	West Liberty	77
2	NW Missouri State	98

Final Four; March 25, 2021
1	West Texas A&M	87
4	Lincoln Memorial	86
2	NW Missouri State	77
3	Flagler	46

National championship March 27, 2021
1	West Texas A&M	54
2	NW Missouri State	80

== See also ==
- 2021 NCAA Division II women's basketball tournament
- 2021 NCAA Division I men's basketball tournament
- 2021 NCAA Division III men's basketball tournament
