= 2017 NCAA Division II men's basketball tournament =

- Teams: 64
- Finals site: Sanford Pentagon, Sioux Falls, South Dakota
- Champions: Northwest Missouri State Bearcats (1st title)
- Runner-up: Fairmont State Falcons (1st title game)
- Semifinalists: Bellarmine Knights (4th Final Four); Lincoln Memorial Railsplitters (2nd Final Four)
- Winning coach: Ben McCollum (1st title)
- MOP: Justin Pitts (Northwest Missouri State)

The 2017 NCAA Division II men's basketball tournament involved 64 teams playing in a single-elimination tournament to determine the national champion of men's NCAA Division II college basketball. It began March 10, 2017, following the 2016–17 season and concluded with the championship game on March 25, 2017.

The eight regional winners met in the Elite Eight for the quarterfinal, semifinal, and championship rounds. For the first time, the Elite Eight was held at the Sanford Pentagon in Sioux Falls, South Dakota.

Northwest Missouri State defeated Fairmont State, 71–61, to win the first national championship in the school's history.

2017 NCAA Division II Men's sites - regionals (cyan) Elite Eight (red)

== Regionals ==
=== Atlantic - Fairmont, West Virginia ===
Location: Joe Retton Arena

Opening Round; Round of 64; March 11
1 | Fairmont State (29–2) | 93
8 | Bowie State | 67
4 | Indiana (PA) (27–3) | 94
5 | Kutztown (26–3) | 80
2 | Shippensburg (26–3) | 79
7 | Virginia Union (22–7) | 59
3 | West Liberty (28–3) | 95
6 | Wheeling Jesuit (23–7) | 96*

Regional semifinals Round of 32; March 12
1 | Fairmont State | 84
4 | Indiana (PA) | 68
2 | Shippensburg | 91
6 | Wheeling Jesuit | 97

Regional Final; Sweet 16; March 14
1 | Fairmont State | 86
6 | Wheeling Jesuit | 80

* – Denotes overtime period

=== Central - Maryville, Missouri ===
Location: Bearcat Arena

Opening Round; Round of 64; March 11
1 | NW Missouri State (29–1) | 79*
8 | Upper Iowa (22–10) | 74
4 | Arkansas–Monticello (23–6) | 69
5 | Augustana (SD) (23–8) | 76
2 | SW Minnesota State (26–5) | 93
7 | Arkansas Tech (21–7) | 82
3 | East Central (24–7) | 115*
6 | Minnesota State–Moorhead (24–5) | 106

Regional semifinals Round of 32; March 12
1 | NW Missouri State | 74
5 | Augustana (SD) | 53
2 | SW Minnesota State | 74
3 | East Central | 70

Regional Final; Sweet 16; March 14
1 | NW Missouri State | 55
2 | SW Minnesota State | 52

* – Denotes overtime period

=== East - DeWitt, New York ===
Location: Le Moyne Events Center

Opening Round; Round of 64; March 11
1 | Le Moyne (22–6) | 68
8 | Merrimack (18–11) | 72*
4 | Saint Anselm (20–8) | 72
5 | St. Thomas Aquinas (25–5) | 91
2 | Southern NH (21–8) | 98
7 | Southern Connecticut (17–12) | 109
3 | Saint Rose (24–7) | 94
6 | Bloomfield (22–9) | 58

Regional semifinals Round of 32; March 12
8 | Merrimack | 70
5 | St. Thomas Aquinas | 73
7 | Southern Connecticut | 47
3 | Saint Rose | 67

Regional Final; Sweet 16; March 15
5 | St. Thomas Aquinas | 69
3 | Saint Rose | 66

* – Denotes overtime period

=== Midwest - Louisville, Kentucky ===
Location: Knights Hall

Opening Round; Round of 64; March 11
1 | Bellarmine (28–3) | 72
8 | Wisconsin–Parkside (22–7) | 61
4 | Kentucky Wesleyan (28–2) | 75
5 | Quincy (24–6) | 78
2 | Ferris State (27–4) | 86
7 | Truman (22–9) | 78
3 | Southern Indiana (25–4) | 69
6 | Findlay (23–6) | 70

Regional semifinals Round of 32; March 12
1 | Bellarmine | 93
5 | Quincy | 64
2 | Ferris State | 63
6 | Findlay | 68

Regional Final; Sweet 16; March 14
1 | Bellarmine | 84
6 | Findlay | 66

=== South - Huntsville, Alabama ===
Location: Spragins Hall

Opening Round; Round of 64; March 11
1 | Alabama–Huntsville (24–7) | 96
8 | Clark Atlanta (21–11) | 81
4 | Barry (22–6) | 91
5 | Eckerd (21–8) | 87
2 | Valdosta State (26–5) | 85
7 | Rollins (21–10) | 89*
3 | Delta State (22–8) | 80
6 | Christian Brothers (18–12) | 67

Regional semifinals Round of 32; March 12
1 | Alabama–Huntsville | 96
4 | Barry | 82
7 | Rollins | 88
3 | Delta State | 61

Regional Final; Sweet 16; March 14
1 | Alabama–Huntsville | 68
7 | Rollins | 72

* – Denotes overtime period

=== Southeast - Charlotte, North Carolina ===
Location: Curry Arena

Opening Round; Round of 64; March 11
1 | Queens (28–3) | 96
8 | Wingate (20–10) | 80
4 | Columbus State (20–9) | 68
5 | Augusta (23–7) | 102
2 | Lincoln Memorial (26–5) | 118
7 | Pfeiffer (26–4) | 86
3 | UNC Pembroke (24–7) | 85
6 | Limestone (26–5) | 100

Regional semifinals Round of 32; March 12
1 | Queens | 88
5 | Augusta | 82
2 | Lincoln Memorial | 70
6 | Limestone | 64

Regional Final; Sweet 16; March 14
1 | Queens | 68
2 | Lincoln Memorial | 82

=== South Central - Golden, Colorado ===
Location: Lockridge Arena

Opening Round; Round of 64; March 11
1 | Colorado Mines (27–4) | 90
8 | Arkansas–Fort Smith (23–11) | 79
4 | Tarleton State (22–7) | 90
5 | Fort Lewis (25–6) | 94*
2 | UT Permian Basin (26–5) | 71
7 | Texas A&M–Kingsville (18–11) | 74
3 | West Texas A&M (24–8) | 97
6 | Texas A&M–Commerce (19–10) | 86

Regional semifinals Round of 32; March 12
1 | Colorado Mines | 86
5 | Fort Lewis | 67
7 | Texas A&M–Kingsville | 64
3 | West Texas A&M | 76

Regional Final; Sweet 16; March 14
1 | Colorado Mines | 88
3 | West Texas A&M | 63

* – Denotes overtime period

=== West - San Diego, California ===
Location: RIMAC

Opening Round; Round of 64; March 11
1 | UC San Diego (25–5) | 94
8 | Dixie State (19–8) | 68
4 | California Baptist (25–4) | 71
5 | San Francisco State (25–5) | 50
2 | Hawaii Pacific (28–2) | 73
7 | Sonoma State (20–8) | 61
3 | Western Washington (25–5) | 83
6 | Chico State (23–7) | 96

Regional semifinals Round of 32; March 12
1 | UC San Diego | 84
4 | California Baptist | 80
2 | Hawaii Pacific | 74
6 | Chico State | 77

Regional Final; Sweet 16; March 13
1 | UC San Diego | 86
6 | Chico State | 94

== Elite Eight - Sioux Falls, South Dakota ==
Location: Sanford Pentagon

National Quarterfinals; Elite Eight; March 22
1 | Fairmont State | 86
8 | Rollins | 68
4 | Bellarmine | 92
5 | Colorado Mines | 72
2 | NW Missouri State | 79
7 | St. Thomas Aquinas | 70
3 | Lincoln Memorial | 74
6 | Chico State | 61

National semifinals Final Four; March 23
1 | Fairmont State | 79
4 | Bellarmine | 68
2 | NW Missouri State | 79
3 | Lincoln Memorial | 67

National Championship; March 25
1 | Fairmont State | 61
2 | NW Missouri State | 71
