= Aston Francis =

American basketball player (born 1997)

Personal information
- Born: March 20, 1997 (age 29)
- Listed height: 6 ft 1 in (1.85 m)
- Listed weight: 195 lb (88 kg)

Career information
- High school: All Saints Episcopal (Tyler, Texas)
- College: Tyler JC (2015–2016); Wheaton (2016–2019)
- NBA draft: 2019: undrafted
- Playing career: 2020–2022
- Position: Point guard / shooting guard

Career history
- 2020–2021: Mega Tbilisi
- 2021–2022: Wisconsin Herd
- 2022: Lakeland Magic

Career highlights
- Georgian A-League Player of the Year (2021); Georgian A-League Finals MVP (2021); Bevo Francis Award (2019); 2× Second-team Division III All-American – NABC (2018, 2019); 2× CCIW Most Outstanding Player (2018, 2019); 3× First-team All-CCIW (2018, 2019)

Aston Francis (born March 20, 1997) is an American former professional basketball player He played college basketball for three seasons at Wheaton College, where he won the Bevo Francis Award after averaging an NCAA-leading 34.3 points per game in his senior season. Francis previously played for Tyler Junior College.

== Early life and high school career ==
Francis began playing basketball at age four or five, as well as soccer and baseball. His father taught him about basketball. Francis played the sport for All Saints Episcopal School in Tyler, Texas, where his father was the athletic director and coach. As a senior, he averaged 21.7 points per game, leading his team to the Texas Association of Private and Parochial Schools 4A title game. Francis was named Tyler Morning Telegraph Player of the Year and ETFinalScore.com All-East Texas Most Valuable Player. Francis

== College career ==
In his freshman season, Francis played for Tyler Junior College, averaging 4.5 points per game in limited playing time, before transferring to NCAA Division III program Wheaton College. On January 12, 2017, he scored a sophomore season-high 39 points in a loss to Illinois Wesleyan, the ninth-most single-game points in program history. As a sophomore, Francis led the College Conference of Illinois and Wisconsin with 23.4 points per game and made a school-record 94 three-pointers. He was named to the first team All-CCIW. On December 9, 2017, Francis scored a junior season-high 45 points in a double overtime win over Elmhurst, the fifth-highest single-game total in Wheaton history. He finished the season averaging a program-record 27.4 points, 4.8 rebounds and 4.4 assists per game, while breaking his own single-season program record with 121 three-pointers. Francis was named CCIW Most Outstanding Player and was named a second-team Division III All-American by the National Association of Basketball Coaches (NABC) and D3hoops.com.

As a senior, he led Wheaton to its first Final Four at the NCAA Division III Tournament. In the clinching game on March 9, 2019, Francis scored an NCAA tournament-record 62 points, including 12 three-pointers, to go with 12 rebounds in a win over Marietta. He finished the tournament averaging 44.8 points per game, setting a new record. In his senior season, he averaged 34.3 points per game, which led all NCAA divisions, and scored a Division III-record 1,096 points while sporting a crew cut. Additionally, Francis was the Division III leader in three-pointers, field goals and free throws. He averaged a team-high 7.9 rebounds and ranked second on his team with 3.1 assists per game. Francis was honored with the Bevo Francis Award and was named D3hoops.com Player of the Year. He was a first-team All-American by D3hoops.com and a second-team Division III All-American by NABC. Francis won CCIW Most Outstanding Player for his second straight season. He left Wheaton with the second-most points in program history and as its all-time leader in three-pointers.

== Professional career ==
Francis joined Mega Tbilisi in Georgia on December 23, 2020. He scored 23 points in a 96–86 defeat of Kavkasia, as Mega secured a sweep for the Georgian A-Liga Championship in his first season. Francis was named to the League 1st Team, and won honors for Player of the Year and Finals MVP.

On December 25, 2021, Francis joined the Wisconsin Herd, the NBA G League affiliate for 2021 NBA reigning champions Milwaukee Bucks. Francis was then later waived on January 19, 2022.

On January 25, Francis was acquired by the Lakeland Magic, making his debut that evening for the team. He was then later waived on January 29, 2022.

== Coaching career ==
In April 2023, Francis was appointed to the position of Head Basketball Coach at his high school alma mater, All Saints Episcopal School in Tyler, Texas. He was appointed to replace his father, Eddie Francis, who left All Saints to coach at rival high school Grace Community School, also in Tyler, TX.

== In popular culture ==
Francis was the subject of a 2019 rap song by a SoundCloud rapper titled “Astro Francis.” The song references numerous real and fictional aspects of Francis’ life and basketball career at Wheaton College.
