= NABC Player of the Year =

National Association of Basketball Coaches player award

- Awarded for: the most outstanding men's basketball players in all levels of competition
- Country: United States
- Presented by: NABC

History
- First award: 1975
- Most recent: NCAA DI: Cameron Boozer, Duke; NCAA DII: Tyree Campbell, Cal State East Bay; NCAA DIII: Sam Grieger, Wisconsin-La Crosse; NAIA: Jesse Van Kalsbeek, Northwestern (IA); Two-year schools: Terry Copeland, Howard (TX)
- Website: Official website

The NABC Player of the Year is an award given annually by the National Association of Basketball Coaches (NABC) to recognize the top player in men's college basketball across the four largest college athletic associations in the United States. The award has been given since the 1974–75 season to National Collegiate Athletic Association (NCAA) Division I basketball players and since 1982–83 to both Division II and Division III players. At the National Association of Intercollegiate Athletics (NAIA) and two-year schools' levels it has been awarded since 2007–08. The award is voted on by NABC member coaches across all divisions. Through approximately the 1998–99 season, the Division I players were presented with the Eastman Award.^{[a]}

Through the 2025–26 college basketball season, there have been 14 multiple-time winners spanning the four associations. No player who has been a lower division player of the year (i.e. any division lower than NCAA Division I) has transferred to a higher-division school and become a repeat NABC player of the year.

== Key ==
†	Co-Players of the Year
Player (X)	Denotes the number of times the player has received the NABC Player of the Year award

== Players of the Year ==
=== NCAA ===
Division I
Season	Player	Team	Position	Class	Reference
1974–75	David Thompson	NC State	SG / SF	Senior	
1975–76	Scott May	Indiana	F	Senior	
1976–77	Marques Johnson	UCLA	G / F	Senior	
1977–78	Phil Ford	North Carolina	PG	Senior	
1978–79	Larry Bird	Indiana State	SF	Senior	
1979–80	Michael Brooks	La Salle	F	Senior	
1980–81	Danny Ainge	BYU	SG	Senior	
1981–82	Ralph Sampson	Virginia	C	Junior	
1982–83	Ralph Sampson (2)	Virginia	C	Senior	
1983–84	Michael Jordan	North Carolina	SG	Junior	
1984–85	Patrick Ewing	Georgetown	C	Senior	
1985–86	Walter Berry	St. John's	PF	Senior	
1986–87	David Robinson	Navy	C	Senior	
1987–88	Danny Manning	Kansas	PF	Senior	
1988–89	Sean Elliott	Arizona	SF	Senior	
1989–90	Lionel Simmons	La Salle	SF	Senior	
1990–91	Larry Johnson	UNLV	PF	Senior	
1991–92	Christian Laettner	Duke	PF	Senior	
1992–93	Calbert Cheaney	Indiana	SF	Senior	
1993–94	Glenn Robinson	Purdue	SF / PF	Junior	
1994–95	Shawn Respert	Michigan State	SG	Senior	
1995–96	Marcus Camby	UMass	C	Junior	
1996–97	Tim Duncan	Wake Forest	C	Senior	
1997–98	Antawn Jamison	North Carolina	SF	Junior	
1998–99	Elton Brand	Duke	C	Sophomore	
1999–00	Kenyon Martin	Cincinnati	PF	Senior	
2000–01	Jay Williams	Duke	PG	Sophomore	
2001–02^{†}	Drew Gooden	Kansas	C	Junior	
2001–02^{†}	Jay Williams (2)	Duke	PG	Junior	
2002–03	Nick Collison	Kansas	PF	Senior	
2003–04^{†}	Jameer Nelson	Saint Joseph's	PG	Senior	
2003–04^{†}	Emeka Okafor	UConn	C	Junior	
2004–05	Andrew Bogut	Utah	C	Sophomore	
2005–06^{†}	Adam Morrison	Gonzaga	SF	Junior	
2005–06^{†}	JJ Redick	Duke	SG	Senior	
2006–07	Kevin Durant	Texas	SF	Freshman	
2007–08	Tyler Hansbrough	North Carolina	PF	Junior	
2008–09	Blake Griffin	Oklahoma	PF	Sophomore	
2009–10	Evan Turner	Ohio State	SF	Junior	
2010–11	Jimmer Fredette	BYU	PG	Senior	
2011–12	Draymond Green	Michigan State	PF	Senior	
2012–13	Trey Burke	Michigan	PG	Sophomore	
2013–14	Doug McDermott	Creighton	SF	Senior	
2014–15	Frank Kaminsky	Wisconsin	PF / C	Senior	
2015–16	Denzel Valentine	Michigan State	SG	Senior	
2016–17	Frank Mason III	Kansas	PG	Senior	
2017–18	Jalen Brunson	Villanova	PG	Junior	
2018–19	Zion Williamson	Duke	SF / PF	Freshman	
2019–20	Obi Toppin	Dayton	PF	Sophomore	
2020–21	Luka Garza	Iowa	C	Senior	
2021–22	Oscar Tshiebwe	Kentucky	C	Junior	
2022–23	Zach Edey	Purdue	C	Junior	
2023–24	Zach Edey (2)	Purdue	C	Senior	
2024–25	Cooper Flagg	Duke	SG / SF	Freshman	
2025–26	Cameron Boozer	Duke	PF	Freshman	

Division II
Season	Player	Team	Position	Class	Reference
1974–75	No award				
1975–76	No award				
1976–77	No award				
1977–78	No award				
1978–79	No award				
1979–80	No award				
1980–81	No award				
1981–82	No award				
1982–83	Earl Jones	District of Columbia	C	Junior	
1983–84	Earl Jones (2)	District of Columbia	C	Senior	
1984–85	Charles Oakley	Virginia Union	PF	Senior	
1985–86	Todd Linder	Tampa	SF	Junior	
1986–87	Ralph Tally	Norfolk State	PG	Senior	
1987–88	Jerry Johnson	Florida Southern	PG	Senior	
1988–89	Kris Kearney	Florida Southern	F	Senior	
1989–90	A. J. English	Virginia Union	SG	Senior	
1990–91	Corey Crowder	Kentucky Wesleyan	SF / SG	Senior	
1991–92	Eric Manuel	Oklahoma City	SF	Senior	
1992–93	Alex Wright	Central Oklahoma	SG	Senior	
1993–94	Derrick Johnson	Virginia Union	C / PF	Senior	
1994–95	Stan Gouard	Southern Indiana	G	Junior	
1995–96	Stan Gouard (2)	Southern Indiana	G	Senior	
1996–97	Kebu Stewart	Cal State Bakersfield	PF	Senior	
1997–98	Joe Newton	Central Oklahoma	PG / SG	Senior	
1998–99	Antonio García	Kentucky Wesleyan	F	Senior	
1999–00	Ajumu Gaines	Charleston (WV)	PG	Senior	
2000–01	Colin Ducharme	Longwood	PF	Senior	
2001–02	Ronald Murray	Shaw	SG / PG	Senior	
2002–03	Marlon Parmer	Kentucky Wesleyan	PG	Senior	
2003–04	Elad Inbar	UMass Lowell	F	Senior	
2004–05	Mark Worthington	MSU Denver	F	Senior	
2005–06^{†}	Darius Hargrove	Virginia Union	SG / SF	Senior	
2005–06^{†}	Turner Trofholz	South Dakota	PF	Senior	
2006–07	John Smith	Winona State	C	Junior	
2007–08	John Smith (2)	Winona State	C	Senior	
2008–09	Josh Bostic	Findlay	SF	Senior	
2009–10	Jason Westrol	Bentley	PG	Senior	
2010–11	Darryl Webb	IUP	F	Senior	
2011–12	Braydon Hobbs	Bellarmine	PG	Senior	
2012–13	Clayton Vette	Winona State	PF	Senior	
2013–14	Brandon Jefferson	MSU Denver	PG	Senior	
2014–15	Mitch McCarron	MSU Denver	SG	Senior	
2015–16	Dan Jansen	Augustana (SD)	PF	Senior	
2016–17	Justin Pitts	NW Missouri State	PG	Junior	
2017–18	Zach Hankins	Ferris State	C	Junior	
2018–19	Daulton Hommes	Point Loma	G	Junior	
2019–20	Brett Hanson	Florida Southern	G	Senior	
2020–21	Trevor Hudgins	NW Missouri State	G	Junior	
2021–22	Trevor Hudgins (2)	NW Missouri State	G	Senior	
2022–23	RJ Sunahara	Nova Southeastern	F	Junior	
2023–24	KJ Jones II	Emmanuel	PG	Senior	
2024–25	MJ Iraldi	Nova Southeastern	F	Graduate	
2025–26	Tyree Campbell	Cal State East Bay	G	Senior	

Division III
Season	Player	Team	Position	Class	Reference
1974–75	No award				
1975–76	No award				
1976–77	No award				
1977–78	No award				
1978–79	No award				
1979–80	No award				
1980–81	No award				
1981–82	No award				
1982–83	Leroy Witherspoon	SUNY Potsdam	PG	Junior	
1983–84	Leroy Witherspoon (2)	SUNY Potsdam	PG	Senior	
1984–85	Tim Casey	Wittenberg	G	Senior	
1985–86	Dick Hempy	Otterbein	G	Junior	
1986–87	Brendan Mitchell	SUNY Potsdam	SF	Senior	
1987–88	Scott Tedder	Ohio Wesleyan	SF / SG	Senior	
1988–89	Greg Grant	TCNJ	PG	Senior	
1989–90	Matt Hancock	Colby	SG	Senior	
1990–91	Brad Baldridge	Wittenberg	C	Senior	
1991–92	Andre Foreman	Salisbury State	PF	Senior	
1992–93	Steve Hondred	Calvin	C	Senior	
1993–94	Scott Fitch	Geneseo	G	Senior	
1994–95	D'Artis Jones	Ohio Northern	SG	Senior	
1995–96	David Benter	Hanover	F	Senior	
1996–97	Bryan Crabtree	Illinois Wesleyan	SF	Senior	
1997–98	Mike Nogelo	Williams	F	Senior	
1998–99	Merrill Brunson	Wisconsin–Platteville	PG / SG	Junior	
1999–00	Aaron Winkle	Calvin	PF	Senior	
2000–01	Horace Jenkins	William Paterson	PG	Senior	
2001–02	Jeff Gibbs	Otterbein	F	Senior	
2002–03	Bryan Nelson	Wooster	F	Senior	
2003–04	Richard Melzer	Wisconsin–River Falls	F	Senior	
2004–05	Jason Kalsow	Wisconsin–Stevens Point	PF	Junior	
2005–06	Brandon Adair	Virginia Wesleyan	SF	Junior	
2006–07^{†}	Andrew Olson	Amherst	PG	Junior	
2006–07^{†}	Ben Strong	Guilford	C	Junior	
2007–08	Andrew Olson (2)	Amherst	PG	Senior	
2008–09	Jimmy Bartolotta	MIT	SG	Senior	
2009–10	Tyler Sanborn	Guilford	C	Senior	
2010–11	Michael Taylor	Whitworth	SG	Senior	
2011–12	Chris Davis	Wisconsin–Whitewater	PF	Senior	
2012–13	Aaron Toomey	Amherst	PG	Junior	
2013–14	Aaron Walton-Moss	Cabrini	PG	Junior	
2014–15	Aaron Walton-Moss (2)	Cabrini	PG	Senior	
2015–16	Joey Flannery	Babson	PG	Junior	
2016–17	Joey Flannery (2)	Babson	PG	Senior	
2017–18	Tyheim Monroe	Cabrini	PF	Senior	
2018–19	Booker Coplin	Augsburg	SG	Junior	
2019–20	Nate West	LeTourneau	PG	Senior	
2020–21	Not presented due to COVID-19 disruptions				
2021–22	Ryan Turell	Yeshiva	SG	Senior	
2022–23	Tyson Cruickshank	Wheaton (IL)	PG	Graduate	
2023–24	Logan Pearson	Wisconsin–Platteville	F	Senior	
2024–25	Octavio Brito	Keene State	G	Senior	
2025–26	Sam Grieger	Wisconsin-La Crosse	G	Junior	

=== NAIA ===
Non-divisional era (2021–present)
Season	Player	Team	Position	Class	Reference
2007–08	Split into NAIA Divisions I and II				
2008–09	Split into NAIA Divisions I and II				
2009–10	Split into NAIA Divisions I and II				
2010–11	Split into NAIA Divisions I and II				
2011–12	Split into NAIA Divisions I and II				
2012–13	Split into NAIA Divisions I and II				
2013–14	Split into NAIA Divisions I and II				
2014–15	Split into NAIA Divisions I and II				
2015–16	Split into NAIA Divisions I and II				
2016–17	Split into NAIA Divisions I and II				
2017–18	Split into NAIA Divisions I and II				
2018–19	Split into NAIA Divisions I and II				
2019–20	Split into NAIA Divisions I and II				
2020–21	Kyle Mangas (2)	Indiana Wesleyan	G	Senior	
2021–22	Zach Wrightsil	Loyola (LA)	SG / SF	Senior	
2022–23	Mason Walters	Jamestown (ND)	F	Senior	
2023–24	Elijah Moore	Grace	C	Senior	
2024–25	Kashie Natt	LSU–Alexandria	G	Senior	
2025–26	Jesse Van Kalsbeek	Northwestern (IA)	F	Sophomore	

Division I (2008–2020)
Season	Player	Team	Position	Class	Reference
2007–08	Ollie Bailey	Oklahoma City	F	Senior	
2008–09	Geoff Payne	Westminster	F	Senior	
2009–10	Nate Brumfield	Oklahoma Baptist	F	Senior	
2010–11	Justin Johnson	Concordia Irvine	G	Senior	
2011–12	Emmanuel Wilson	Oklahoma Baptist	G	Senior	
2012–13^{†}	Vic Moses	Georgetown (KY)	F	Senior	
2012–13^{†}	Dominique Rambo	Nelson^{[b]}	G	Junior	
2013–14	Dominique Rambo (2)	Nelson^{[b]}	G	Senior	
2014–15	Kenny Manigault	Pikeville	SG / SF	Senior	
2015–16	Deondre McWhorter	Georgetown (KY)	PF	Senior	
2016–17	Delarian Williams	Life	F	Senior	
2017–18	Ryan Imhoff	Carroll (MT)	SG	Senior	
2018–19	Jeff Garrett	LSU–Shreveport	PF	Senior	
2019–20	Chris Coffey	Georgetown (KY)	PF	Senior	

Division II (2008–2020)
Season	Player	Team	Position	Class	Reference
2007–08	Ryan Fiegi	Oregon Tech	G	Senior	
2008–09	William Walker	Bethel (IN)	F	Senior	
2009–10	Steve Briggs	Oklahoma Wesleyan	G	Senior	
2010–11	Sadiel Rojas	Oklahoma Wesleyan	F	Senior	
2011–12	Jonathan Dunn	Northwood	G	Senior	
2012–13	Ra'Shad James	Northwood	G	Senior	
2013–14	Joe Mitchell	Friends	G	Senior	
2014–15	Dominez Burnett	Davenport	F	Junior	
2015–16	Dominez Burnett (2)	Davenport	F	Senior	
2016–17	Warren Hall	Warner	PG	Senior	
2017–18	Kyle Steigenga	Cornerstone	F	Senior	
2018–19	Cameron Hunt	Southwestern (KA)	PG	Senior	
2019–20	Kyle Mangas	Indiana Wesleyan	G	Junior	

=== Two-year schools ===
Since two-year college players only attend for two years, these players are only either freshmen or sophomores. Afterwards, they move on to four-year universities to finish their last two seasons of NCAA eligibility. The University column reflects which team these players would play for following their respective two-year college national player of the year seasons.

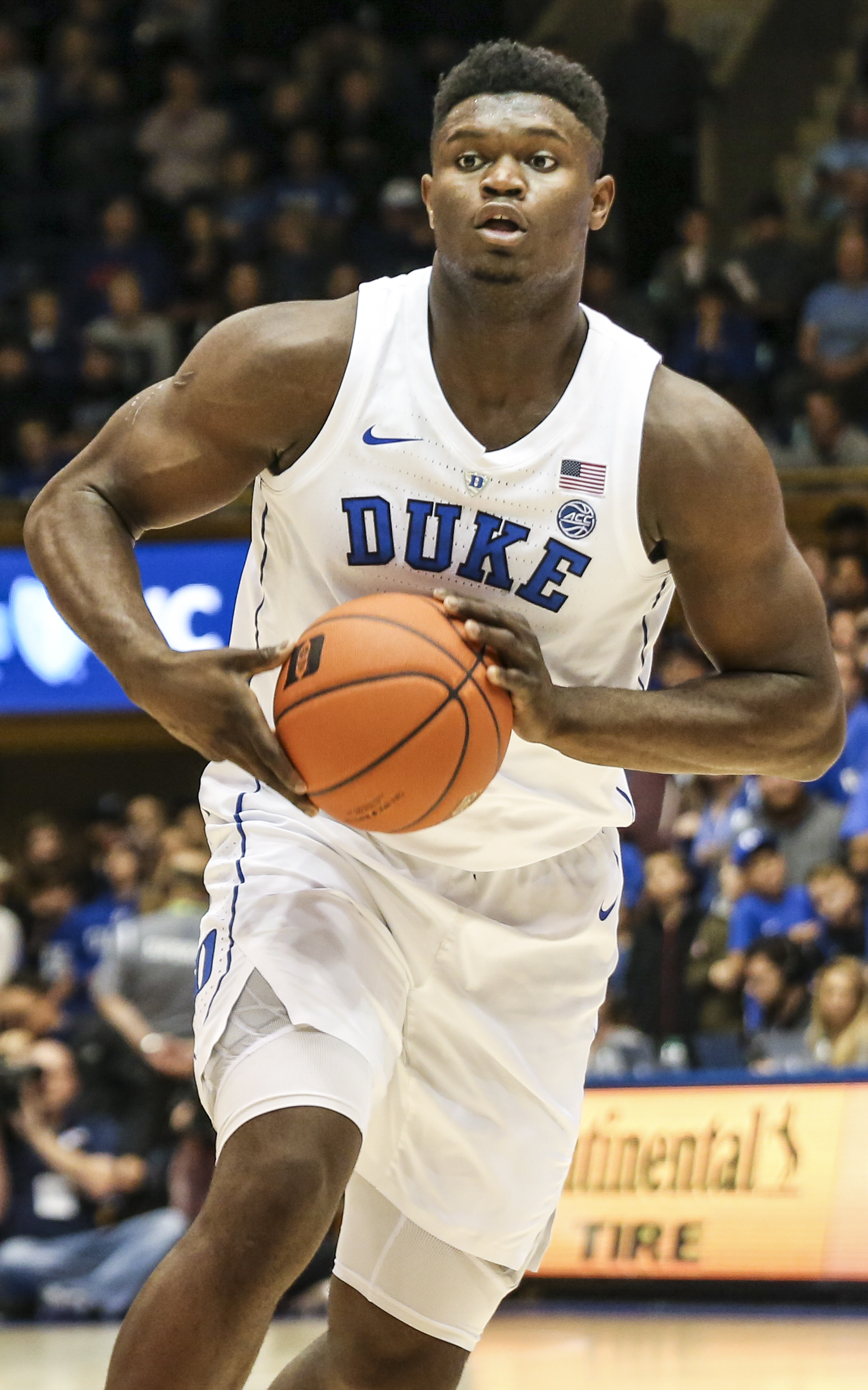
Zion Williamson, NCAA Division I, Duke, 2019

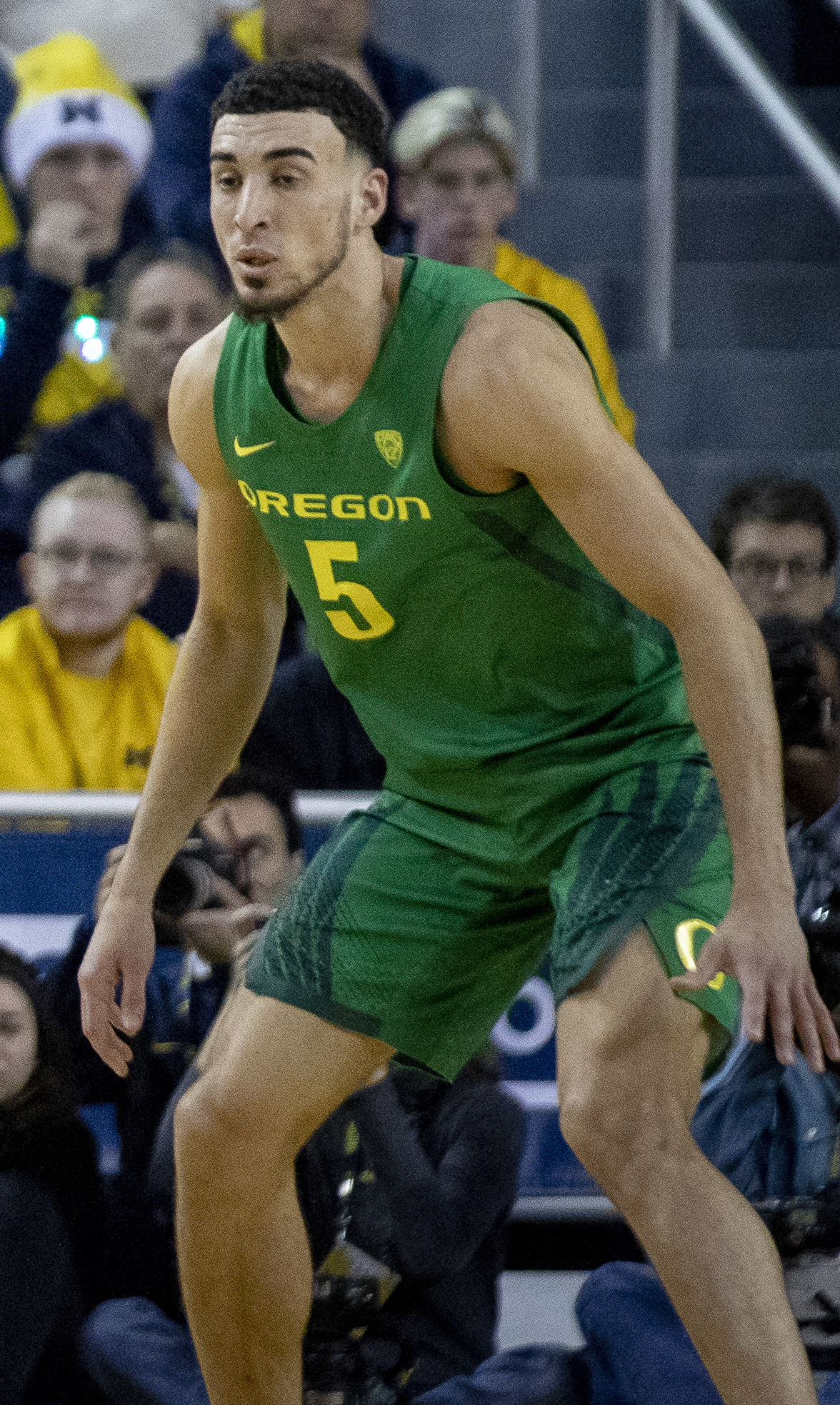
Chris Duarte, two-year schools, Northwest Florida State, 2019

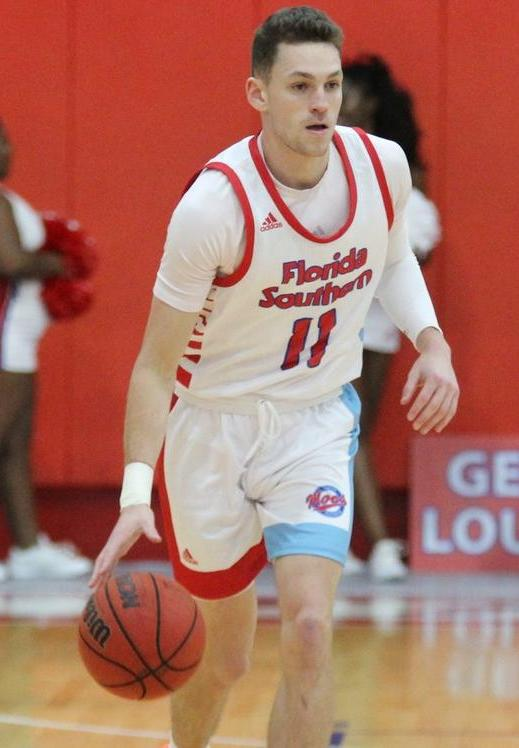
Brett Hanson, NCAA Division II, Florida Southern, 2020

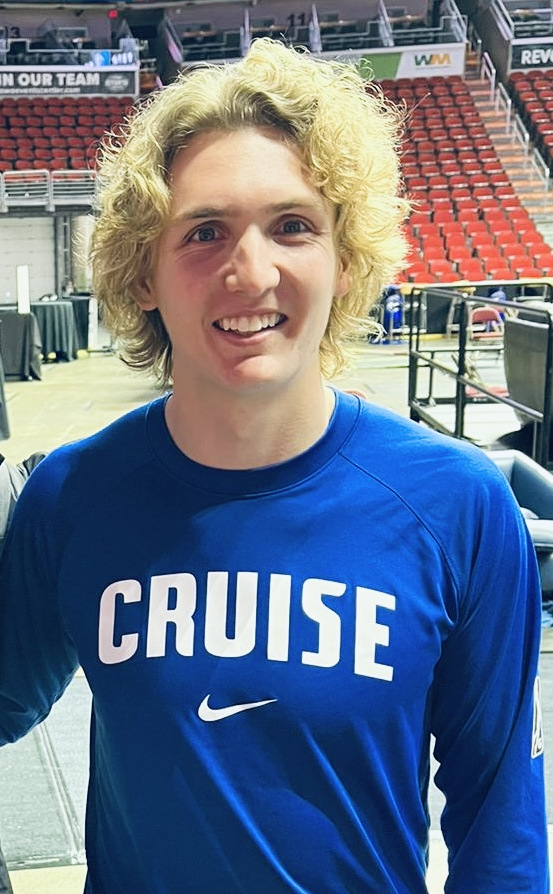
Ryan Turell, NCAA Division III, Yeshiva, 2022

Season	Player	Two-year school	Position	Class	University	Reference
2007–08	Jeremie Simmons	Mott	G	Sophomore	Ohio State	
2008–09	Nafis Ricks	Johnson County	G	Sophomore	Missouri State	
2009–10	Jae Crowder	Howard (TX)	F	Sophomore	Marquette	
2010–11	Kiel Turpin	Lincoln (IL)	C	Sophomore	Florida State	
2011–12	Cleanthony Early	SUNY Sullivan	PF	Sophomore	Wichita State	
2012–13	Chris Jones	Northwest Florida State	G	Sophomore	Louisville	
2013–14	Kadeem Allen	Hutchinson	G	Sophomore	Arizona	
2014–15	Brandon Brown	Phoenix	G	Sophomore	Loyola Marymount	
2015–16	Kavell Bigby-Williams	Gillette	F	Sophomore	Oregon	
2016–17	Shakur Juiston	Hutchinson	F	Sophomore	UNLV	
2017–18	Charles Jones Jr.	College of Southern Idaho	G	Sophomore	Utah	
2018–19	Chris Duarte	Northwest Florida State	G	Sophomore	Oregon	
2019–20	Jay Scrubb	John A. Logan	G	Sophomore	None^{[c]}	
2020–21	Malevy Leons	Mineral Area	F	Sophomore	Bradley	
2021–22	Damarco Minor	South Suburban	G	Sophomore	SIU Edwardsville	
2022–23	Curt Lewis	John A. Logan	G	Sophomore	Missouri	
2023–24	Jemel Jones	South Suburban	G	Sophomore	Cal State Bakersfield	
2024–25	Isaac Finlinson	Snow	SF	Sophomore	Hawaii	
2025–26	Terry Copeland	Howard (TX)	PF / C	Freshman	Seton Hall	

- ^{a} Newspapers.com's most recent search results that find mentions of the NABC's player of the year being honored with the "Eastman Award" end in 1999, with Duke's Elton Brand.
- ^{b} When Dominique Rambo won back-to-back NAIA Division I Player of the Year, Nelson University was known as Southwestern Assemblies of God University (SAGU).
- ^{c} On March 25, 2020, Scrubb declared for the 2020 NBA draft while maintaining his eligibility and did not immediately sign with an agent. On April 9, he announced that he would sign with an agent and forgo his remaining college basketball eligibility. Scrubb had previously committed to play for Louisville prior to changing his decision.

== See also ==
- List of U.S. men's college basketball national player of the year awards
- NABC Coach of the Year – the equivalent honor for men's head coaches at all levels of college basketball competition
