= Emanuel Terry =

American basketball player (born 1996)

- Terry with Trabzonspor in 2026

No. 33 – Trabzonspor
- Position: Power forward / center
- League: Basketbol Süper Ligi; FIBA Champions League

Personal information
- Born: August 21, 1996 (age 30) Birmingham, Alabama, U.S.
- Listed height: 6 ft 9 in (2.06 m)
- Listed weight: 220 lb (100 kg)

Career information
- High school: Cleveland (Cleveland, Alabama)
- College: Lincoln Memorial (2014–2018)
- NBA draft: 2018: undrafted
- Playing career: 2018–present

Career history
- 2018–2019: Canton Charge
- 2019: Sioux Falls Skyforce
- 2019: Phoenix Suns
- 2019: Miami Heat
- 2019–2020: Teksüt Bandırma
- 2020: Hapoel Jerusalem
- 2020: Crvena zvezda
- 2021: Agua Caliente Clippers
- 2021–2022: Stockton Kings
- 2021–2022: Phoenix Suns
- 2022: Orléans Loiret Basket
- 2022–2023: Seoul Samsung Thunders
- 2023: Pallacanestro Trieste
- 2023–2024: Manisa BB
- 2024–2025: Beşiktaş
- 2025–2026: Kawasaki Brave Thunders
- 2026–present: Trabzonspor

Career highlights
- Bevo Francis Award winner (2018); First-team Division II All-American – NABC (2018); SAC Player of the Year (2018); SAC Defensive Player of the Year (2018); First-team All-SAC (2018)
- Stats at NBA.com
- Stats at Basketball Reference

Emanuel Davon Terry (born August 21, 1996) is an American professional basketball player for Trabzonspor of the Turkish Basketbol Süper Ligi (BSL) and the FIBA Champions League. He played college basketball for the Lincoln Memorial Railsplitters, earning Division II All-American honors in 2018.

== College career ==
Terry, a 6’9 power forward from Cleveland High School in Cleveland, Alabama, began his career as a reserve at Lincoln Memorial. He had a breakout season as a senior, averaging 16.9 points, 10.3 rebounds and 2.2 blocked shots per game. Terry led the Railsplitters to South Atlantic Conference (SAC) regular season and tournament championships. For the 2017–18 season, he was named the SAC Player of the Year and was the inaugural conference defensive player of the year. On the national level, Terry was named an All-American by the National Association of Basketball Coaches. He also won the Bevo Francis Award as the top small college player in the country.

== Professional career ==
=== Canton Charge (2018–2019) ===
After going undrafted in 2018, Terry was signed by the Denver Nuggets for their NBA Summer League team. Following a strong showing there, he was signed by the Nuggets to compete for a roster spot on their training camp roster. On October 8, 2018, Terry was waived by the Nuggets. On October 11, 2018, Terry was signed to the Cleveland Cavaliers to their training camp roster. On October 13, he was waived by the Cavaliers. He was then added to the training camp roster for the Cavaliers’ NBA G League affiliate, the Canton Charge. Terry played 20 games for Canton, averaging 8.1 points and 6.4 rebounds for the team.

=== Sioux Falls Skyforce / Phoenix Suns / Miami Heat (2019) ===
On January 5, 2019, Terry was traded to the Sioux Falls Skyforce for guard Malik Newman. Since the trade, Terry improved upon his averages with Sioux Falls, averaging around 15.9 points, 8.1 rebounds, 1.6 assists, and 1.3 blocks per game in the seven games he played for them.

On January 27, 2019, Terry signed a 10-day contract with the Phoenix Suns and made his NBA debut the same day. That night, he recorded 5 points, 3 rebounds, 2 steals, and an assist in 8 minutes of play during a 116–102 loss to the Los Angeles Lakers. He played in one other game with the Suns before the 10-day contract expired on February 7. The next day, he was reacquired by Sioux Falls.

On February 20, 2019, Terry signed a 10-day contract with the Miami Heat. He was re-acquired by the Skyforce afterwards.

=== Teksüt Bandırma (2019–2020) ===
On July 29, 2019, Terry signed a one-year contract with Teksüt Bandırma of the Basketball Super League. In 20 games, he averaged 10.8 points, 7.9 rebounds, 1.3 assists, 1.1 steals, and 1.1 blocks per game.

=== Hapoel Jerusalem (2020) ===
On March 1, 2020, Terry signed with Hapoel Jerusalem of the Israeli Premier League. In 10 games, he averaged 9.4 points, 6.5 rebounds, and 1.3 assists per game.

=== Crvena zvezda (2020) ===
On September 17, 2020, Crvena zvezda announced the signing of Terry on a two-year deal. On December 26, they terminated his contract.

=== Agua Caliente Clippers (2021) ===
For the 2020–21 season, Terry landed with the Agua Caliente Clippers of the G League, making his debut on February 11, 2021. He averaged 11 points, 10 rebounds, two assists and one block per game.

=== Stockton Kings / Return to the Phoenix Suns (2021–2022) ===
In August 2021, Terry joined the Sacramento Kings for the 2021 NBA Summer League. On September 28, 2021, he signed a contract with the Kings. Terry was waived on October 15 and joined the Stockton Kings later that month.

On December 27, 2021, Terry signed a 10-day contract returning with the Phoenix Suns via the COVID-19 hardship waiver. Terry played 3 games with the Suns in that contract, averaging 5 rebounds per game there, before being waived early from it. On January 4, 2022, he was reacquired and activated by Stockton.

=== Orléans Loiret Basket (2022) ===
On April 9, 2022, Terry signed with Orléans Loiret Basket of the French Betclic Élite.

=== Seoul Samsung Thunders (2022–2023) ===
On August 11, 2022, he has signed with Seoul Samsung Thunders of the Korean Basketball League.

=== Pallacanestro Trieste (2023) ===
On January 17, 2023, he signed with Pallacanestro Trieste of the Italia Lega Basket Serie A (LBA).

=== Manisa BB (2023–2024) ===
On July 17, 2023, he signed with Manisa BB of the Turkish Basketbol Süper Ligi (BSL).

=== Beşiktaş (2024–2025) ===
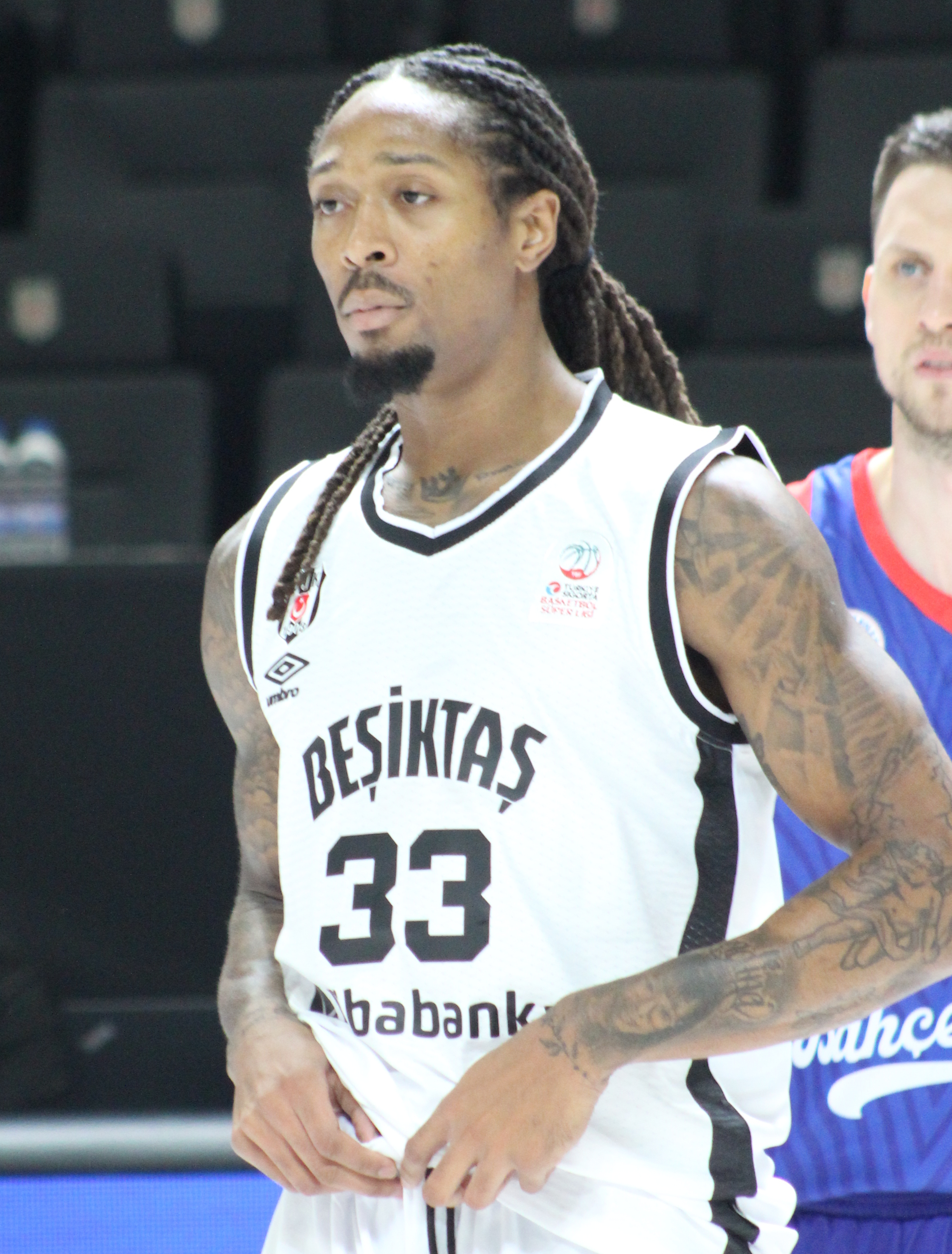
Terry with Beşiktaş Fibabanka in 2024

On June 28, 2024, Terry signed with Beşiktaş Fibabanka of the Basketbol Süper Ligi (BSL).

=== Kawasaki Brave Thunders (2025–2026) ===
On July 10, 2025, Terry signed with Kawasaki Brave Thunders of the B.League.

=== Trabzonspor (2026–present) ===
On June 15, 2026, he signed with Trabzonspor of the Basketbol Süper Ligi (BSL).

== Career statistics ==
Legend
| GP | Games played | GS | Games started | MPG | Minutes per game |
| FG% | Field goal percentage | 3P% | 3-point field goal percentage | FT% | Free throw percentage |
| RPG | Rebounds per game | APG | Assists per game | SPG | Steals per game |
| BPG | Blocks per game | PPG | Points per game | **Bold** | Career high |

=== NBA ===
| Year | Team | GP | GS | MPG | FG% | 3P% | FT% | RPG | APG | SPG | BPG | PPG |
|---|---|---|---|---|---|---|---|---|---|---|---|---|
| 2018–19 | Phoenix | 2 | 0 | **10.0** | **.667** | — | **.500** | 3.0 | .5 | **1.5** | .0 | **4.5** |
| 2018–19 | Miami | 1 | 0 | 3.0 | .000 | — | **.500** | 1.0 | **1.0** | .0 | .0 | 1.0 |
| 2021–22 | Phoenix | **3** | 0 | 6.0 | .000 | — | — | **5.0** | .7 | .3 | .0 | .0 |
| Career | | 6 | 0 | 6.8 | .333 | — | .500 | 3.7 | .7 | .7 | .0 | 1.7 |
