= Bevo Francis Award =

US college basketball award

- Awarded for: the nation’s top small college basketball player
- Country: United States
- Presented by: Small College Basketball Foundation

History
- First award: 2016
- Most recent: Jesse Van Kalsbeek, Northwestern (IA)
- Website: Bevo Francis Award

The Bevo Francis Award is an American college basketball award given annually since 2016. The award recognizes the top small college basketball player in the United States for a given season. The award is named after the late Bevo Francis, who earned national acclaim and All-American status for Rio Grande College in the 1950s.

Eligible players must come from below NCAA Division I. Players are eligible if they compete in one of the following college basketball divisions: NCAA Divisions II or III; NAIA (and while the NAIA had classifications of Divisions I or II between 2016 and 2020); USCAA Divisions I or II; and NCCAA Divisions I or Division II.

The first winner was Dominez Burnett of Davenport University. Only two schools, Northwest Missouri State University and Nova Southeastern University, have won the award more than once.

== Winners ==
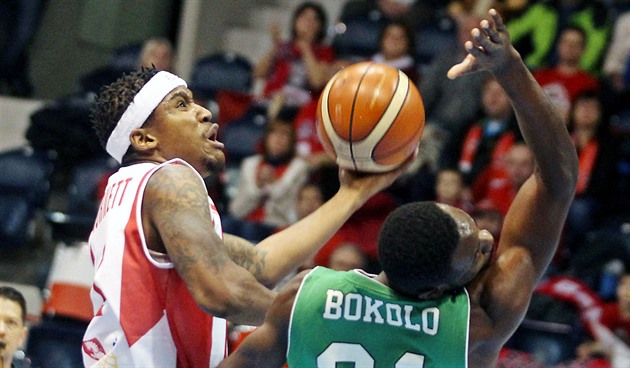
Dominez Burnett, Davenport, 2016

Season	Player	School	Class	Division	Reference
2015–16	Dominez Burnett	Davenport	Senior	NAIA Division II	
2016–17	Justin Pitts	Northwest Missouri State	Junior	NCAA Division II	
2017–18	Emanuel Terry	Lincoln Memorial	Senior	NCAA Division II	
2018–19	Aston Francis	Wheaton (IL)	Senior	NCAA Division III	
2019–20	Kyle Mangas	Indiana Wesleyan	Junior	NAIA Division II	
2020–21	Not awarded				
2021–22	Trevor Hudgins	Northwest Missouri State	Senior	NCAA Division II	
2022–23	RJ Sunahara	Nova Southeastern	Junior	NCAA Division II	
2023–24	Elijah Malone	Grace	Senior	NAIA	
2024–25	MJ Iraldi	Nova Southeastern	Senior	NCAA Division II	
2025–26	Jesse Van Kalsbeek	Northwestern (IA)	Sophomore	NAIA	
