= Dominez Burnett =

American basketball player (born 1992)

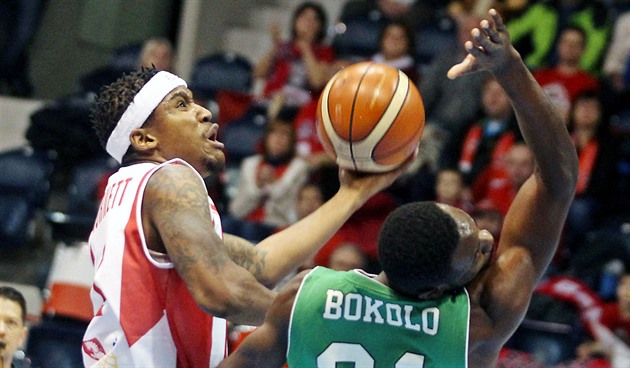
- Burnett in action with Pardubice

Retired
- Position: Shooting guard

Personal information
- Born: October 28, 1992 (age 34) Flint, Michigan, U.S.
- Listed height: 1.97 m (6 ft 6 in)
- Listed weight: 90 kg (198 lb)

Career information
- High school: Northwestern (Flint, Michigan)
- College: Davenport (2012–2016)
- NBA draft: 2016: undrafted
- Playing career: 2016–present

Career history
- 2016–2018: Pardubice
- 2018: Ventspils
- 2018–2019: Universo Treviso
- 2019–2020: Tsmoki-Minsk
- 2021: MZT Skopje
- 2021: BK JIP Pardubice
- 2021–2022: JA Vichy Basket
- 2022–2023: Ironi Nahariya

Career highlights
- Serie A2 champion (2019); Latvian League champion (2018); Bevo Francis Award winner (2016); 2× NABC NAIA DII Player of the Year (2015, 2016)

Dominez Burnett (born October 28, 1992) is an American former professional basketball player from Flint, Michigan. Burnett last played for Ironi Nahariya. In 2016, Burnett was named the Bevo Francis National Small College Basketball Player of the Year. Prior to that, in 2015, Burnett was named the NABC NAIA Division II Player of the Year, while playing for Davenport University.

== Professional career ==
Burnett started his professional career in 2016 with BK Pardubice and as a rookie lead his team in scoring. He also was the fifth leading scorer in the FIBA Europe Cup. Burnett shot 58% from the field as a rookie in FIBA and resigned with BK Pardubice for the 2017–18 season.

On January 14, 2018, after leading the Czech Basketball League in scoring, Burnett was bought out his contract and joined BK Ventspils of the Latvian Basketball League where he won a Latvian Championship in the 2017–18 season. Burnett won the Italian Serie A2 cup and the Italian Serie A2 Championship with Universo Treviso on June 17, 2019.

On August 7, 2019, Burnett signed with Tsmoki-Minsk of the VTB United League.
