= James Brockermeyer =

American football player (born 2002)

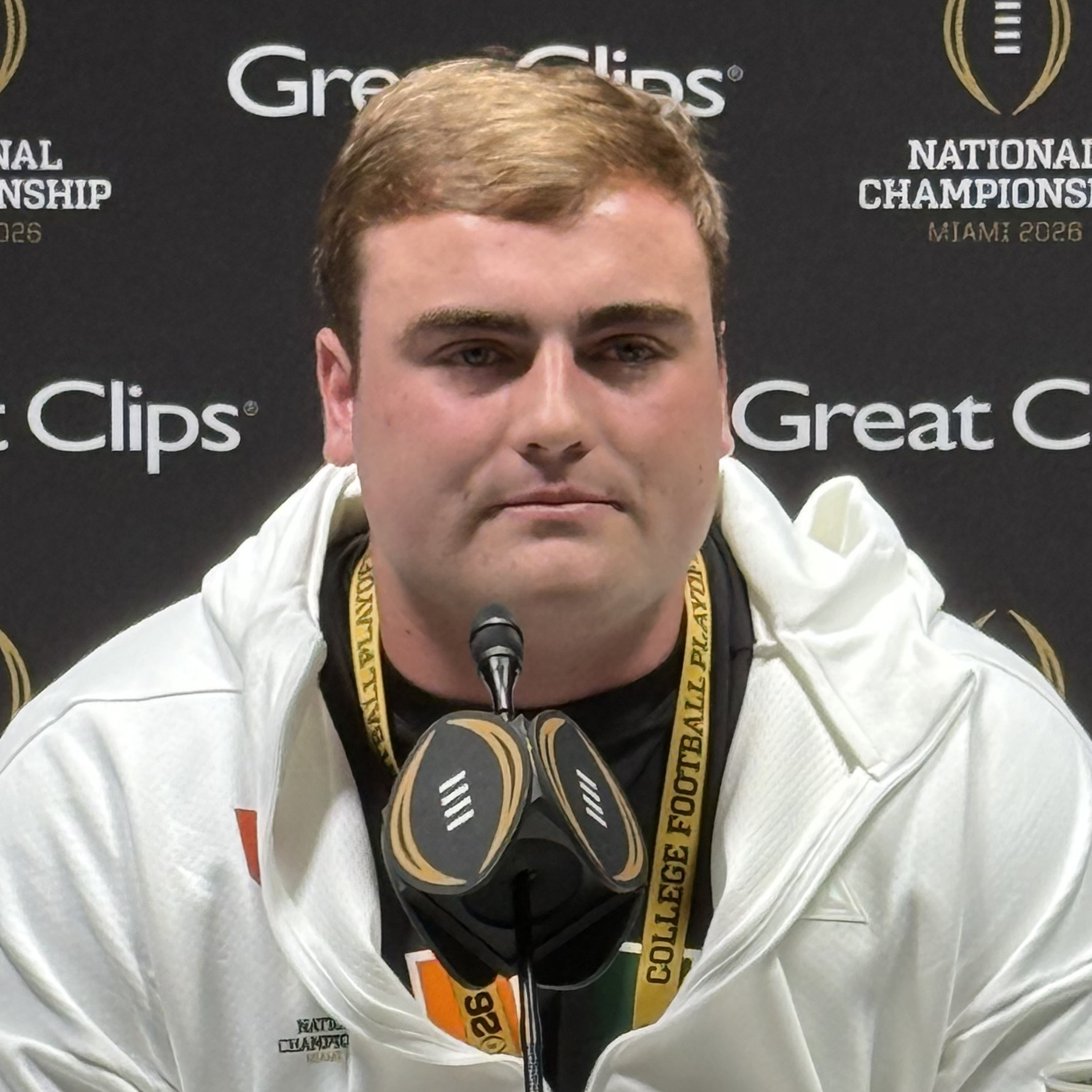
- Brockermeyer in 2026

Profile
- Position: Center

Personal information
- Born: June 24, 2002 (age 24)
- Listed height: 6 ft 3 in (1.91 m)
- Listed weight: 298 lb (135 kg)

Career information
- High school: All Saints Episcopal (Fort Worth, Texas)
- College: Alabama (2021–2023); TCU (2024); Miami (FL) (2025)
- NFL draft: 2026: undrafted

Career history
- Atlanta Falcons (2026)*; Philadelphia Eagles (2026)*
- * Offseason or practice squad member only

Awards and highlights
- First-team All-American (2025); Third-team All-ACC (2025)
- Stats at Pro Football Reference

James Brockermeyer (born June 24, 2002) is an American professional football center. He played college football for the Alabama Crimson Tide, the TCU Horned Frogs and the Miami Hurricanes. He was signed as an undrafted free agent by the Falcons in 2026.

== Early life ==
Brockermeyer attended high school at All Saints Episcopal School located in Fort Worth, Texas. Coming out of high school, he was rated as a four-star recruit, and the 32nd overall player in the State of Texas, where he committed to play college football for the Alabama Crimson Tide alongside his twin brother Tommy, over other offer from schools such as Auburn, LSU, and Texas.

== College career ==
=== Alabama ===
During his three-year career at Alabama from 2021 through 2023, he played in 16 total games, while also utilizing a redshirt season. After the conclusion of the 2023 season, Brockermeyer entered his name into the NCAA transfer portal.

=== TCU ===
Brockermeyer transferred to play for the TCU Horned Frogs. During the 2024 season, he appeared in and started all 12 games for the Horned Frogs. After the conclusion of the 2024 season, Brockermeyer once again entered his name into the NCAA transfer portal.

=== Miami ===
Brockermeyer transferred to play for the Miami Hurricanes. He entered the 2025 season as the Hurricanes' starting center. For his performance during the 2025 season, Brockermeyer was named third-team all-ACC, while also being named a first-team All-American.

== Professional career ==
Pre-draft measurables
Height	Weight	Arm length	Hand span	Wingspan	40-yard dash	10-yard split	20-yard split	20-yard shuttle	Three-cone drill	Vertical jump	Broad jump	Bench press
6 ft 3 in (1.91 m)	298 lb (135 kg)	32 in (0.81 m)	9 3/8 in (0.24 m)	6 ft 6 in (1.98 m)	5.31 s	1.80 s	3.01 s	4.72 s	7.98 s	28.5 in (0.72 m)	8 ft 5 in (2.57 m)	26 reps
All values from Pro Day

=== Atlanta Falcons ===
Brockermeyer was signed as an undrafted free agent by the Atlanta Falcons after the conclusion of the 2026 NFL draft. On August 30, 2026, Brockermeyer was waived by the Falcons as a part of final roster cuts; he was re-signed to the team's practice squad the next day. On September 21, Brockermeyer was released by the Falcons.

=== Philadelphia Eagles ===
On October 7, 2026, Brockermeyer signed with the Philadelphia Eagles practice squad. On October 20, 2026, Brockermeyer was released.

== Personal life ==
Brockermeyer is the son of former NFL offensive tackle Blake Brockermeyer, and the twin brother of former five-star tackle Tommy Brockermeyer. He is also the brother of coach Luke Brockermeyer, and grandson of Kay Brockermeyer who played college football at Texas.
