= Kyle Mangas =

American basketball player (born 1999)

No. 24 – Greensboro Swarm
- Position: Point guard / shooting guard
- League: NBA G League

Personal information
- Born: April 8, 1999 (age 27) Warsaw, Indiana, U.S.
- Listed height: 6 ft 4 in (1.93 m)
- Listed weight: 200 lb (91 kg)

Career information
- High school: Warsaw (Warsaw, Indiana)
- College: Indiana Wesleyan (2017–2021)
- NBA draft: 2021: undrafted
- Playing career: 2021–present

Career history
- 2021–2022: USK Praha
- 2022–2023: Šiauliai-7bet
- 2023–2025: Indiana Mad Ants
- 2025: Austin Spurs
- 2025: Vancouver Bandits
- 2025–2026: Austin Spurs
- 2026–present: Greensboro Swarm

Career highlights
- NBA G League Next Up Game (2024); Bevo Francis Award (2020); 2× NABC NAIA DII Player of the Year (2020, 2021); NAIA Division II champion (2018); NAIA Division II tournament MVP (2018); NAIA Academic All-American of the Year (2021); 4× First-team NAIA Division II All-American (2018–2021); 4× Crossroads League Player of the Year (2018–2021)
- Stats at NBA.com
- Stats at Basketball Reference

Kyle Mangas (born April 8, 1999) is an American professional basketball player for the Greensboro Swarm of the NBA G League. He played college basketball for the Indiana Wesleyan Wildcats. In his junior season, he won the Bevo Francis Award and was named NABC NAIA Division II Player of the Year, and in his senior season was named Academic All-American of the Year in NAIA men's basketball.

== Early life ==
Mangas grew up playing basketball under his father's coaching. He quit playing football after his sophomore year of high school to focus on basketball. Mangas played for Warsaw Community High School in Warsaw, Indiana, where he led his team to a 61–17 record over three seasons. As a senior, Mangas was named an Indiana All-Star and scored 47 points against East Chicago Central High School. He left Warsaw with 1,450 career points, the fourth-most in school history. Mangas chose to play college basketball for National Association of Intercollegiate Athletics (NAIA) Division II program Indiana Wesleyan in April 2017, in part because he "connected with the coach staff and players."

== College career ==
As a freshman for Indiana Wesleyan, Mangas averaged 21.5 points, 5.2 rebounds and 2.9 assists per game, winning the 2018 NAIA Division II Tournament, where he was named Most Outstanding Player. He was recognized as Crossroads League Player of the Year, becoming the first freshman to win the award, and scored a single-season school-record 818 points. Mangas also earned NAIA Division II All-American First Team accolades. In his sophomore season, Mangas averaged 23.6 points, 5.0 rebounds and 3.8 assists per game, repeating as Crossroads League Player of the Year and being selected to the NAIA Division II All-American First Team. As a junior, he averaged 26.9 points, 6.4 rebounds and 4.2 assists per game, claiming the Bevo Francis Award and NABC NAIA Division II Player of the Year. For his third straight year, he was named Crossroads League Player of the Year and to the NAIA Division II All-American First Team. Mangas finished the season with the second-most points in the NAIA Division II and as Indiana Wesleyan's all-time leading scorer. As a senior, Mangas averaged 29.5 points, 7.4 rebounds, 5.1 assists and 1.9 steals per game. In 2021, he was named the Academic All-American of the Year in NAIA men's basketball.

== Professional career ==
=== USK Praha (2021–2022) ===
On September 1, 2021, Mangas signed his first professional contract with USK Praha of the Czech National Basketball League.

=== Šiauliai-7bet (2022–2023) ===
On August 10, 2022, Mangas signed with Šiauliai-7bet of the Lithuanian Basketball League (LKL).

=== Indiana Mad Ants (2023–2025) ===
On October 17, 2023, Mangas signed with the Indiana Pacers, but was waived the next day. On October 28, Mangas joined the Indiana Mad Ants. On July 3, 2024, Mangas signed with the Los Angeles Lakers for the Summer League, but did not make the final roster. On August 23, Mangas was signed once again by the Pacers, but was waived three days later. On October 27, he re-joined the Mad Ants.

=== Vancouver Bandits (2025) ===
On April 22, 2025, Mangas signed with the Vancouver Bandits of the CEBL.

=== Austin Spurs (2025–2026) ===
Mangas rejoined the Austin Spurs for the 2025–26 season. On December 12, 2025, the San Antonio Spurs signed Mangas to a two-way contract. He did not make an appearance for San Antonio, and was waived following the signing of Stanley Umude on December 22. In July 2026, Mangas joined the Boston Celtics for the 2026 NBA Summer League in Las Vegas.

=== Greensboro Swarm (2026–present) ===
Mangas was traded to the Greensboro Swarm on August 19, 2026. On September 2, 2026, Mangas signed an Exhibit 10 contract with the Charlotte Hornets, only to be waived the following day.

== Personal life ==
Mangas' father, Tim, played basketball for Wawasee High School in Syracuse, Indiana, where he scored over 1,000 career points, before playing college basketball for DePauw University. His mother, Ann, also played for Wawasee and was a member of its 1985 state runner-up team. Mangas' older brother, Jake, played football and basketball for Warsaw High School. Mangas studied finance at Indiana Wesleyan.
