= Justin Pitts =

American basketball player (born 1994)

Personal information
- Born: October 26, 1994 (age 32)
- Listed height: 5 ft 10 in (1.78 m)
- Listed weight: 135 lb (61 kg)

Career information
- High school: Blue Springs South (Blue Springs, Missouri)
- College: Northwest Missouri State (2014–2018)
- NBA draft: 2018: undrafted
- Playing career: 2018–2022
- Position: Point guard

Career history
- 2018–2022: HLA Alicante

Career highlights
- NCAA Division II champion (2017); NCAA Division II Tournament MVP (2017); NABC Division II Player of the Year (2017); Bevo Francis Award winner (2017); 2× First-team Division II All-American (2017, 2018); 3× MIAA Player of the Year (2016–2018); 4× First-team All-MIAA (2015–2018); MIAA Freshman of the Year (2015); 3× MIAA Tournament MOP (2016–2018)

Justin James Pitts (born October 26, 1994) is an American former professional basketball player. He played college basketball for the Northwest Missouri State Bearcats. A 5’10” point guard, Pitts was named the NABC Division II Player of the Year for the 2016–17 season. He played for HLA Alicante of the Spanish LEB Oro from 2018 to 2022.

== High school career ==
Pitts played at Blue Springs South High School in Blue Springs, Missouri, a suburb of Kansas City. Between his junior and senior seasons, Pitts’ father was transferred from his job to New Orleans. Pitts chose to remain in Blue Springs, moving in with family friends as his family relocated. The move allowed Northwest Missouri State coach Ben McCollum to scout and sign the local player, despite his small size.

== College career ==
Pitts redshirted the 2013–14 season, joining the NCAA Division II Bearcats the next year. He made an immediate impact in his freshman season, averaging 17.2 points per game and earning Mid-America Intercollegiate Athletics Association (MIAA) Freshman of the Year and first-team all-conference honors. As a sophomore, Pitts continued to improve. He averaged 21.7 points on the way to repeating as a first-team All-MIAA pick, earning conference Player of the Year honors and leading the team to an MIAA Tournament championship.

In his junior season, Pitts became one of the top players in Division II nationally. He averaged 20.9 points and led the Bearcats to MIAA regular-season and tournament championships. At the conclusion of the season, he repeated as MIAA Player of the Year. He also gained national recognition, earning All-America honors from several agencies and was named the National Player of the Year by the National Association of Basketball Coaches and Basketball Times magazine, as well as the Bevo Francis Award for top small college player. On the season, Northwest Missouri State compiled a 35–1 record and claimed the school’s first national championship in the 2017 NCAA Division II Tournament. Pitts scored 23 points in the championship game, leading the Bearcats to a 71-61 victory over Fairmont State.

In his senior season, Pitts became the Bearcats all-time leader in points and assists. He scored his 2,000th career point on November 18, 2017, becoming the first player in school history to achieve the feat. He was injured in March 2018 before the Bearcats Central Regional Tournament and missed the remainder of the season.

== Professional career ==
Pitts signed his first professional contract with the PS Karlsruhe Lions of the German ProA. He left the team in the preseason, then signing with HLA Alicante of the Spanish LEB Plata. Pitts was named LEB Oro player of the week on October 20, 2020, after contributing 27 points and four assists in a victory over Bàsquet Girona. He re-signed with the team on October 1, 2021.
