= Great Northwest Athletic Conference women's basketball tournament =

- Conference basketball championship
- Sport: Basketball
- Conference: Great Northwest Athletic Conference
- Number of teams: 6
- Format: Single-elimination tournament
- Played: 2011–present
- Current champion: Montana State Billings (2nd)
- Most championships: Alaska Anchorage (7)
- Official website: GNAC women's basketball

The Great Northwest Athletic Conference women's basketball tournament is the annual women's basketball championship tournament for the Great Northwest Athletic Conference. The tournament has been held annually since 2011. It is a single-elimination tournament and seeding is based on regular season records.

The winner receives the GNAC's automatic bid to the NCAA Women's Division II Basketball Championship.

== Results ==
Year	Champions	Score	Runner-up	MVP	Venue
2011	Alaska Anchorage	68–67	Western Washington	Kaitlin McBride (Alaska Anchorage)	Sam Carver Gymnasium (Bellingham, WA)
2012	Alaska Anchorage	67–52	Western Washington	Haley Holmstead (Alaska Anchorage)	Marcus Pavilion (Lacey, WA)
2013	Western Washington	60–40	Simon Fraser	Trishi Williams (Western Washington)	Marcus Pavilion (Lacey, WA)
2014	Western Washington	78–74	Simon Fraser	Jenni White (Western Washington)	Marcus Pavilion (Lacey, WA)
2015	Alaska Anchorage	71–58	Western Washington	Kiki Robertson (Alaska Anchorage)	Alterowitz Gymnasium (Billings, MT)
2016	Alaska Anchorage	77–57	Montana State Billings	Kiki Robertson (Alaska Anchorage)	Marcus Pavilion (Lacey, WA)
2017	Alaska Anchorage	79–70	Western Washington	Autummn Williams (Alaska Anchorage)	Marcus Pavilion (Lacey, WA)
2018	Montana State Billings	71–61	Seattle Pacific	Alisha Breen (Montana State Billings)	Alaska Airlines Center (Anchorage, AK)
2019	Northwest Nazarene	70–64	Alaska Anchorage	Ellie Logan (Northwest Nazarene)	Sam Carver Gymnasium (Bellingham, WA)
2020	Alaska Anchorage	89–68	Western Washington	Safiyyah Yasin (Alaska Anchorage)	Royal Brougham Pavilion (Seattle, WA)
2021	Cancelled due to COVID-19 pandemic				
2022	Central Washington	57–46	Western Washington	Samantha Bowman (Central Washington)	Marcus Pavilion (Lacey, WA)
2023	Western Washington	76-71	Montana State Billings	Brooke Walling (Western Washington)	Carver Gym (Bellingham, WA)
2024	Western Washington	54–52	Montana State Billings	Brooke Walling (Western Washington)	Nicholson Pavilion (Ellensburg, WA)
2025	Alaska Anchorage	75–59	Saint Martin's	Tori Hollingshead (Alaska Anchorage)	Marcus Pavilion (Lacey, WA)
2026	Montana State Billings	67–61	Western Washington	Cassie Chesnut (Montana State Billings)	Carver Gym (Bellingham, WA)

== Championship records ==
School	Finals Record	Finals Appearances	Years
Alaska Anchorage	7–1	8	2011, 2012, 2015, 2016, 2017, 2020, 2025
Western Washington	4–7	11	2013, 2014, 2023, 2024
Montana State Billings	2–3	5	2018, 2026
Central Washington	1–0	1	2022
Northwest Nazarene	1–0	1	2019
Simon Fraser	0–2	2	
Saint Martin's	0–1	1	
Seattle Pacific	0–1	1	

- Alaska and Western Oregon have not yet qualified for the finals of the tournament
- Concordia (OR) never qualified for the tournament finals as a GNAC member

== See also ==
- Great Northwest Athletic Conference men's basketball tournament
