= Brett Hanson =

American basketball player

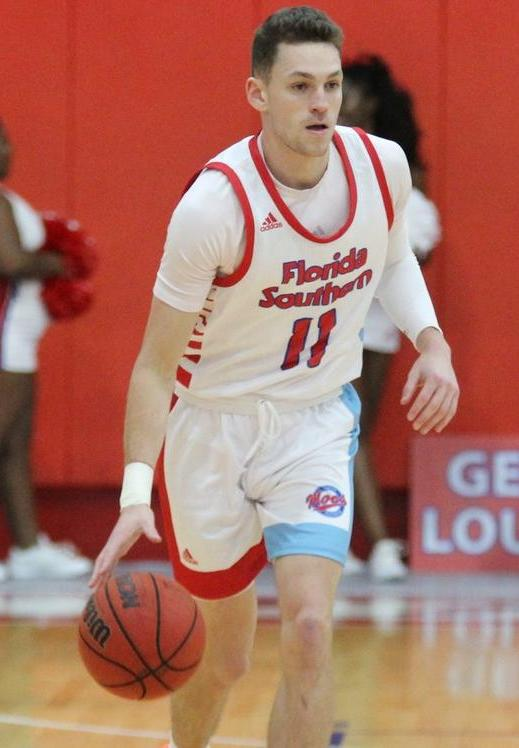
- Hanson at Florida Southern

CB L'Hospitalet
- Position: Point guard / shooting guard
- League: LEB Plata

Personal information
- Born: May 20, 1997 (age 29)
- Listed height: 6 ft 2 in (1.88 m)
- Listed weight: 190 lb (86 kg)

Career information
- High school: Manchester Central (Manchester, New Hampshire); Tilton School (Tilton, New Hampshire)
- College: Florida Southern (2016–2020)
- NBA draft: 2020: undrafted
- Playing career: 2021–present

Career history
- 2021–present: CB L'Hospitalet

Career highlights
- NABC Division II Player of the Year (2020); First-team Division II All-American (2020); SSC Player of the Year (2020); First-team All-SSC (2020); 2× Second-team All-SSC (2018, 2019); 2× SSC Tournament MVP (2019, 2020)

Brett Hanson (born May 20, 1997) is an American basketball player for CB L'Hospitalet of the Spanish LEB Plata. He played college basketball for the Florida Southern Moccasins and was named NABC Division II Player of the Year after his senior season.

== High school career ==
Hanson played his first three years of high school basketball at Manchester Central High School in Manchester, New Hampshire. In 2014, he helped the team win the Division I state championship. Hanson subsequently transferred to Tilton School in Tilton, New Hampshire, where he repeated his junior year. In his first season with Tilton, he led his team to the New England Preparatory School Athletic Council (NEPSAC) title. As a senior, Hanson averaged 19 points and six rebounds per game, reaching the NEPSAC quarterfinals and earning All-NEPSAC honorable mention. Hanson was one of coach Mike Donnelly's first recruits to Florida Southern.

== College career ==
Hanson scored a freshman-season high 29 points against Embry–Riddle. As a freshman, Hanson paced Florida Southern with 13 points and 6.1 rebounds per game. In his sophomore season, he averaged 18 points, 6.5 rebounds and 3.9 assists per game, earning second-team All-Sunshine State Conference (SSC) accolades. As a junior, Hanson averaged 17.9 points, 7.5 rebounds and 2.8 assists per game. He was named second-team All-SSC, as well as SSC Tournament Most Valuable Player (MVP) after scoring 16 points in a title game win over Nova Southeastern. He helped the team reach the NCAA Division II Regional semifinals. Entering his senior season, Hanson assumed a leading role for Florida Southern with the departure of top scorer Jonathan Lawton and the addition of several transfers. As a senior, he averaged 22.4 points, 6.9 rebounds, 4.8 assists and two steals per game. On December 7, 2019, he scored a career-high 42 points in a victory over Lindenwood. Hanson led his team to a second straight SSC Tournament title, winning MVP. He was named NABC Division II Player of the Year, first-team Division II All-American and SSC Player of the Year. Hanson left Florida Southern with 2,238 career points, the third-most in program history. He is also ranked in the top 10 in program history in career rebounds, assists and steals.

== Professional career ==
On January 22, 2021, Hanson signed his first professional deal with CB L'Hospitalet of the Spanish LEB Plata.

== Personal life ==
Hanson's father, Dave, played college basketball for Plymouth State University. His older sister also attended Florida Southern.
