= Jesse Van Kalsbeek =

American basketball player

No. 42 – South Dakota State Jackrabbits
- Position: Small forward
- League: Summit League

Personal information
- Listed height: 6 ft 6 in (1.98 m)
- Listed weight: 225 lb (102 kg)

Career information
- High school: MOC-Floyd Valley (Orange City, Iowa)
- College: Northwestern (IA) (2024–2026); South Dakota State (2026–present)

Career highlights
- NABC NAIA Player of the Year (2026); Bevo Francis Award (2026); First-team NAIA All-American (2026); GPAC Player of the Year (2026); GPAC Freshman of the Year (2025); 2× First-team All GPAC (2025, 2026); Iowa Mr. Basketball (2024)

Jesse Van Kalsbeek is an American college basketball player for the South Dakota State Jackrabbits of the Summit League. He previously played for Northwestern College (IA), where he won the 2026 Bevo Francis Award as the best small college basketball player in the United States.

== Early life and high school ==
Van Kalsbeek grew up in Sheldon, Iowa and attended MOC-Floyd Valley High School. He averaged 20.4 points per game as a junior. As a senior, Van Kalsbeek was named Iowa Mr. Basketball after averaging 26 points and 10.8 rebounds per game.

== College career ==
Van Kalsbeek began his college basketball career playing for NAIA Northwestern College. As a freshman, he was named the Great Plains Athletic Conference (GPAC) Freshman of the Year and first-team All-GPAC after averaging 20.5 points and 9.1 rebounds per game and setting a school freshman record with 678 points scored. As a sophomore, Van Kalsbeek led the NAIA with 27.8 points per game while averaging 12.4 rebounds per game and was named the GPAC Player of the Year, the NABC NAIA Player of the Year, and won the Bevo Francis Award as the best small college basketball player in the nation.

After his sophomore season Van Kalsbeek transferred to South Dakota State.

== Personal life ==
Three of Van Kalsbeek's older brothers played college basketball at Northwestern.
