= Marlon Parmer =

American basketball player (born 1980)

Personal information
- Born: September 28, 1980 (age 46) Hollywood, California, U.S.
- Listed height: 6 ft 2 in (1.88 m)
- Listed weight: 190 lb (86 kg)

Career information
- High school: Verbum Dei (Los Angeles, California)
- College: New Mexico (1999–2002); Kentucky Wesleyan (2002–2003)
- NBA draft: 2003: undrafted
- Playing career: 2003–2009
- Position: Guard

Career history
- 2003–2004: Sioux Falls Skyforce
- 2004: Florence Flyers
- 2004–2005: Yakima Sun Kings
- 2005: Rockford Lightning
- 2006–2007: Qatar Club
- 2007: Guaros de Lara
- 2007: BC Kalev/Cramo
- 2008–2009: Colorado 14ers

Career highlights
- All-CBA First Team (2006); NABC Division II Player of the Year (2003)

Marlon Palmer (born September 28, 1980) is an American former professional basketball player.

== Career ==
- 2008-09: Colorado 14ers (NBA D-League) 15.0 ppg, 6.0 apg, 2.0 spg
- 2007: BC Kalev/Cramo (Est-KML) (9 games): 12.6ppg, 2.7apg, 4.2rpg 0.8spg
- 2007: Guaros De Lara (Ven-LPB) (3 games): 23.5ppg, 8.7apg, 4.2rpg, 2.5spg
- 2006-2007: Qatar Club (QAT-D1, 1T) (21 games): 28.3 ppg, 8.7 apg, 2.5spg,
- 2005: Rockford Lightning (CBA, 1T); (44 games): *20.9ppg, 7.3apg, 4.4ppg, 1.5spg,
- 2005: Minnesota Timberwolves (NBA); released in October *2005
- 2005: (July) Southern California Summer Pro League; (Miami Heat)
- 2005: Chicago Bulls (NBA) minicamp
- 2004-2005: Yakima Sun Kings (CBA, 1T) (12 games): *20.5ppg, 4.0apg, 3.6rpg, 1.56spg
- 2004: Southern California Summer Pro League (Golden State Warriors)
- 2004: Florence Flyers (USBL, 1T) (24 games): 18.8ppg, 8.1apg, 4.2rpg, 1.8spg
- 2003: Drafted by Sioux Fall Skyforce (NDA D-League)
- 2003: Southern California Summer Pro League (Golden State Warriors)
- 2003: Portsmouth Pre-NBA Draft Invitational Tournament
- 2002-2003: Kentucky Wesleyan (NCAA-II)
- 2001-2002: New Mexico (NCAA) 12.8ppg, 5.4apg, 5.4rpg
- 2000-2001: New Mexico (NCAA): 11.4ppg, 5.3apg, 4.1rpg
- 1999-2000: New Mexico (NCAA)
- 1995-1999: Los Angeles, CA/Verbum Dei High School: 28ppg, 9apg

== Awards and achievements ==
- 2007: Qatar Player of the Year
- 2007: Qatar Emir Cup Winner
- 2006: Asia-Basket.com Asian Club Championships 1st Team
- 2006: Asia-Basket.com Asian Club Championships Best Guard
- 2006: All CBA 1st Team
- 2005, 2006: CBA All-Star Game
- 2003: NCAA-II Player of the Year
- 2003: Six-time player of the week (four consecutive) NCAA-II
- 1999: John Wooden High School Player of the Year Award
