= Great Northwest Athletic Conference men's basketball tournament =

- Conference basketball championship
- Sport: Basketball
- Conference: Great Northwest Athletic Conference
- Format: Single-elimination tournament
- Played: 2011–present
- Current champion: Saint Martin's (1st)
- Most championships: Seattle Pacific (5)
- Official website: GNAC men's basketball

Host stadiums
- Campus sites (2011–present)

Host locations
- Campus sites (2011–present)

The Great Northwest Athletic Conference men's basketball tournament is the annual conference basketball championship tournament for the Great Northwest Athletic Conference. The tournament has been held annually since 2011. It is a single-elimination tournament and seeding is based on regular season records.

The winner, declared conference champion, receives the conference's automatic bid to the NCAA Men's Division II Basketball Championship.

== Tournament format ==
Since its establishment in 2011, the GNAC tournament began as an 8-team tournament but has since decreased in size to six teams. The eight-team tournament, played during 2011 and 2012, featured all teams contesting the initial quarterfinal. Meanwhile, the six-team tournament, played since 2013, gave the two top-seeded teams a bye into the semifinals while the remaining teams played in the preliminary quarterfinal round.

Aside from the inaugural tournament in 2011 which was played only on team campuses, the remaining tournaments have been played at rotation amongst the members.

== Results ==
Year	Champions	Score	Runner-up	MVP	Venue
2011	Central Washington	83–71	Alaska Anchorage	Jamar Berry, Central Washington	Nicholson Pavilion (Ellensburg, WA)
2012	Montana State Billings	74–70	Alaska Anchorage	Robert Mayes, Montana State Billings	Marcus Pavilion (Lacey, WA)
2013	Seattle Pacific	72–70	Western Washington	David Downs, Seattle Pacific	Marcus Pavilion (Lacey, WA)
2014	Seattle Pacific	65–62	Western Washington	David Downs (2), Seattle Pacific	Marcus Pavilion (Lacey, WA)
2015	Seattle Pacific	81–68	Western Washington	Cory Hutsen, Seattle Pacific	Alterowitz Gymnasium (Billings, MT)
2016	Western Oregon	78–71	Alaska	Devon Alexander, Western Oregon	Marcus Pavilion (Lacey, WA)
2017	Western Washington	71–69	Western Oregon	Taylor Stafford, Western Washington	Marcus Pavilion (Lacey, WA)
2018	Western Oregon	65–55	Saint Martin's	Vince Boumann, Western Oregon	Alaska Airlines Center (Anchorage, AK)
2019	Seattle Pacific	78-66	Western Oregon	Coleman Wooten, Seattle Pacific	Sam Carver Gymnasium (Bellingham, Washington)
2020	Western Washington	81–78	Alaska Anchorage	Trevor Jasinsky, Western Washington	Royal Brougham Pavilion (Seattle, Washington)
2021	Cancelled due to the COVID-19 pandemic				
2022	Alaska	72–57	Central Washington	Shadeed Shabazz, Alaska	Marcus Pavilion (Lacey, WA)
2023	Northwest Nazarene	65-57	Saint Martin's	Ryzin "Biggie" Bergersen, Northwest Nazarene	Carver Gym (Bellingham, WA)
2024	Central Washington	78–69	Alaska Anchorage	Samaad Hector, Central Washington	Nicholson Pavilion (Ellensburg, WA)
2025	Seattle Pacific	72–61	Central Washington	Mason Landdeck, Seattle Pacific	Marcus Pavilion (Lacey, WA)
2026	Saint Martin's	72–62	Alaska Anchorage	Patrick Kilfoil, Saint Martin's	Carver Gym (Bellingham, WA)

== Championship records ==
School	Finals Record	Finals Appearances	Years
Seattle Pacific	5–0	5	2013, 2014, 2015, 2019, 2025
Western Washington	2–3	5	2017, 2020
Central Washington	2–2	4	2011, 2024
Western Oregon	2–2	4	2016, 2018
Saint Martin's	1–2	3	2026
Alaska	1–1	2	2022
Montana State Billings	1–0	1	2012
Northwest Nazarene	1–0	1	2023
Alaska Anchorage	0–5	5	

- Simon Fraser has not yet qualified for the finals of the tournament.
- Concordia (OR) never qualified for the tournament finals as a GNAC member

== See also ==
- Great Northwest Athletic Conference women's basketball tournament
