= Kebu Stewart =

American basketball player (born 1973)

Personal information
- Born: December 19, 1973 (age 52) Brooklyn, New York, U.S.
- Listed height: 6 ft 8 in (2.03 m)
- Listed weight: 239 lb (108 kg)

Career information
- High school: Our Saviour Lutheran (The Bronx, New York)
- College: UNLV (1993–1995); Cal State Bakersfield (1995–1997)
- NBA draft: 1997: 2nd round, 35th overall pick
- Drafted by: Philadelphia 76ers
- Playing career: 1997–2007
- Position: Power forward
- Number: 41

Career history
- 1997–1998: Philadelphia 76ers
- 1999: Sioux Falls Skyforce
- 1999: Vaqueros de Bayamón
- 2000: Sioux Falls Skyforce
- 2000: Atléticos de San Germán
- 2000–2001: Hapoel Jerusalem
- 2001–2002: Avtodor Saratov
- 2003: UNICS Kazan
- 2003: Prokom Trefl Sopot
- 2003: Adecco Estudiantes
- 2003–2005: NIS Vojvodina
- 2005–2006: Vertical Vision Cantù
- 2006–2007: Seoul SK Knights
- 2007: Crvena zvezda
- 2007: Barons/LMT Rīga

Career highlights
- All-CBA First Team (2000); NCAA Division II champion (1997); NABC Division II Player of the Year (1997); Big West Conference Player of the Year (1994)
- Stats at NBA.com
- Stats at Basketball Reference

Kebu Omar Stewart (born December 19, 1973) is an American assistant college basketball coach and retired basketball player. He played in the National Basketball Association (NBA) and had a rich international career, playing in several countries.

== High school and college career ==
Stewart was a star high school player at national powerhouse Oak Hill Academy and later on at Our Saviour Lutheran in the Bronx, where he averaged nearly 36 points per game and earned honorable mention All American honors in the 1992–92 season.

Stewart signed to play at UNLV, but was academically ineligible his freshman year. He redshirted, and played the 1993–94 season with the Runnin' Rebels. Although Stewart wasn't eligible until January, he won Big West Conference Men's Basketball Player of the Year honors (becoming the first ever freshman to win the award), averaging 19 points and 12 rebounds per game. Stewart, who reportedly clashed with the coaching staff several times, was suspended from the team after the following season. He later transferred to Division II Cal State Bakersfield, where he went on to become Division II Player of the Year and California Collegiate Athletic Association Player of the Year as a senior, leading the team to the NCAA Division II national championship. He also led the nation (Division II) in rebounding as a senior in 1996–97 with 13.4 rpg.

== Professional career ==
Stewart was drafted by the Philadelphia 76ers in the 2nd round of the 1997 NBA draft, and played 15 games during the 1997–98 NBA season, averaging 2.7 points and 2.1 rebounds per game. He played for the Sioux Falls Skyforce of the Continental Basketball Association (CBA) from 1998 to 2000. He was selected to the All-CBA First Team in 2000.

Stewart started his overseas career in Israel with Hapoel Jerusalem in the 2000–01 season. Then, he played for Avtodor Saratov and UNICS in Russia (2001–2003). He also played few games for Prokom Trefl Sopot (Poland) and Adecco Estudiantes (Spain), before signed for NIS Vojvodina (Serbia and Montenegro) in late 2003. After two seasons there, he moved to Italy and played for Vertical Vision Cantù in the 2005–06 season. In the 2006–07 season, he played for Seoul SK Knights (South Korea) and Crvena zvezda (Serbia). He last played for Barons/LMT Rīga (Latvia) in the 2007–08 season, but left the team during the first half of the season.

== Coaching career ==
At present, Stewart works as an assistant basketball coach for Occidental College, an NCAA Division III college located in Los Angeles, California.
