= All Saints Episcopal School (Tyler, Texas) =

Private school in Tyler, Texas, US

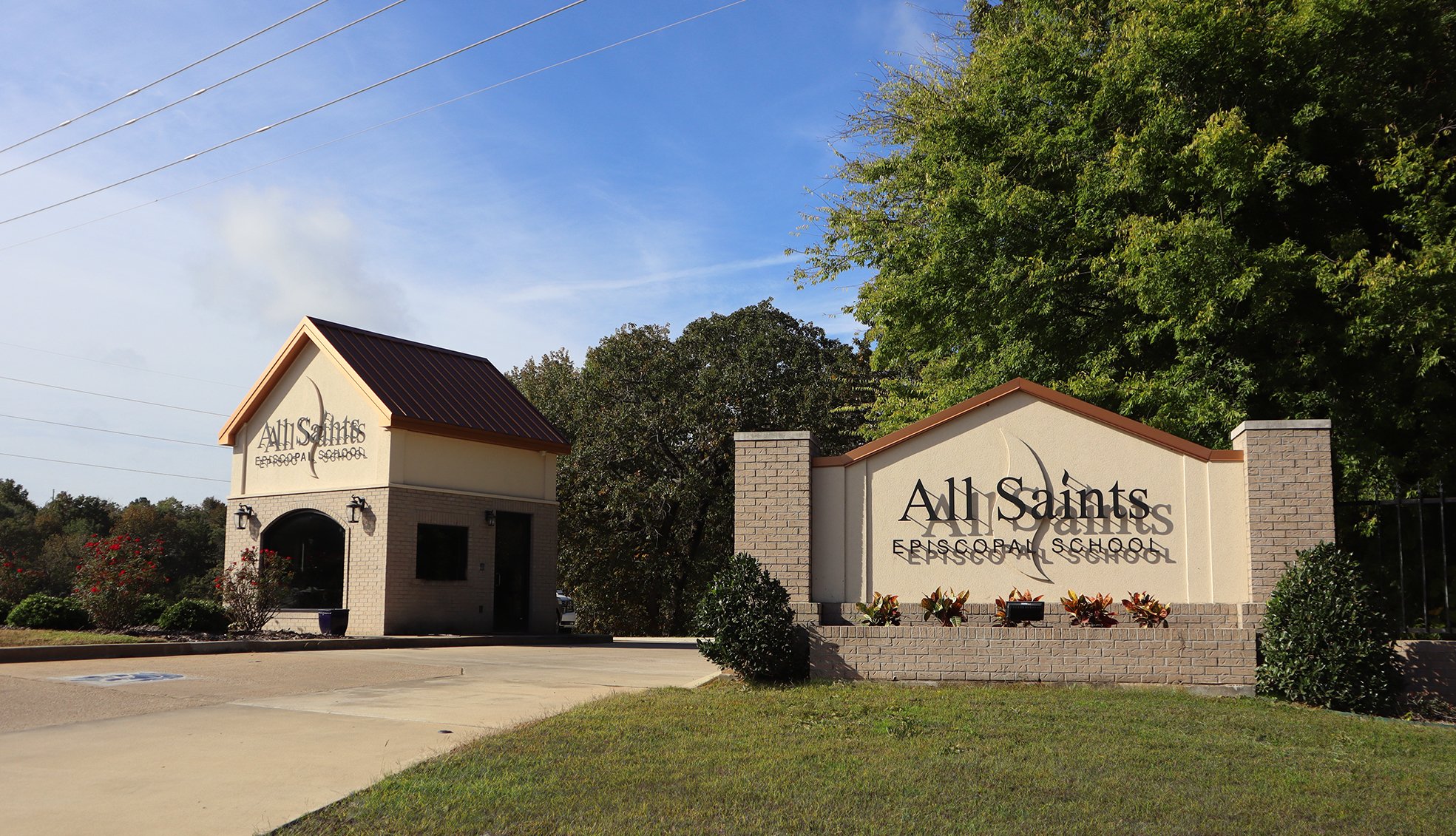

Location
- 2695 S SW Loop 323; Tyler, Texas 75701; United States; 32°18′40″N 95°15′30″W

Information
- School type: Private, Christian
- Motto: Discover Your All
- Denomination: Episcopalian
- Founded: 1976
- Head of school: Mark D. Desjardins, PhD
- Teaching staff: 61.6 (on a FTE basis)
- Grades: 3K–12
- Enrollment: 654 (2019-2020) (including 81 pre-kindergarten)
- Student to teacher ratio: 9.3
- Colors: Blue & White
- Sports: Football, Volleyball, Basketball, Soccer, Track, Golf, Baseball, Softball, Cross Country, Tennis
- Mascot: Trojan
- Website: www.all-saints.org

All Saints Episcopal School is a small private Christian school in Tyler, Texas. It is a college preparatory school from Pre-kindergarten through 12th grade.

All Saints Episcopal School was founded in 1976. In the first year, the school had 118 students and 11 faculty. In 1982, Mr. W. W. Wagley donated 20 acres for a new school site which is the school's current campus. In 1983, the new building was completed for the 1983 - 1984 school year, and 326 students were enrolled in preschool through 8th grade.

== Notable alumni ==
- James Brockermeyer, college football center for the Miami Hurricanes
