= Virginia Union Panthers =

Collegiate sports club in the United States

- University: Virginia Union University
- Conference: CIAA (primary)
- NCAA: Division II
- Athletic director: Joe Taylor
- Location: Richmond, Virginia
- Varsity teams: 13 (5 men's, 8 women's)
- Football stadium: Hovey Field
- Basketball arena: Barco-Stevens Hall
- Softball stadium: VUU Softball Field
- Tennis venue: Arthur Ashe Courts in Battery Park
- Mascot: Howie the Panther
- Nickname: Panthers
- Colors: Maroon and steel
- Website: vuusports.com
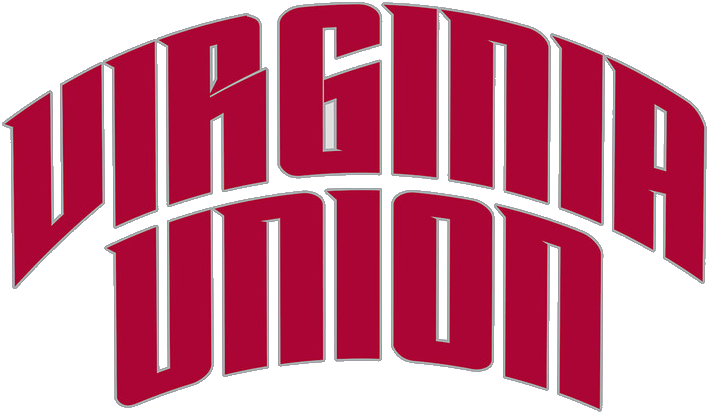

The Virginia Union Panthers are the athletic teams that represent Virginia Union University, located in Richmond, Virginia, in NCAA Division II intercollegiate sports. The Panthers compete as members of the Central Intercollegiate Athletic Association for all 13 varsity sports. Virginia Union has been a member of the conference since 1912.

== History ==
Virginia Union plays basketball and volleyball in the Barco-Stevens Hall, built as the Belgian Building for the 1939 New York World's Fair. The building, which has stone reliefs depicting the Belgian Congo, was one of thirteen facilities designated as "unique" by NCAA News in 2005. The building was awarded to the university in 1941 and moved to its present location in 1943. The basketball team began using the facility in early 1947.

== List of teams ==
Men's sports	
Basketball	Basketball
Cross Country	Bowling
Football	Cross country
Golf	Softball
Tennis	Tennis
Track & Field	Track & Field
	Volleyball

== Individual sports ==
=== Men's basketball ===
Under the leadership of head coach Dave Robbins since 1978, the Panthers basketball program has been to the Division II "Final Four" seven times (1980, 1991, 1992, 1996, 1998, 2005, 2006) and have won three NCAA Division II national championship titles (1980, 1992, 2005). The team was the 2006 National runner-up with a record of 30–4. The team has captured the Central Intercollegiate Athletic Association conference championship 20 times with the latest being 2018.

The school plays in an annual exhibition game with the Division I cross-town rival Virginia Commonwealth University. Coach Robbins' program has produced eight NBA players, including Detroit Pistons hall of fame center Ben Wallace, and former New York Knicks power forward Charles Oakley. Terry Davis Center Power Forward Miami Heat

=== Women's basketball ===
The women's basketball team won the NCAA Women's Division II Basketball Championship in 1983. The VUU women's basketball team were also the Division 2 National runners-up in 2016-2017 losing to Ashland University.
