= Fairmont State Fighting Falcons =

Intercollegiate sports teams of Fairmont State University

- University: Fairmont State University
- Nickname: Fighting Falcons
- NCAA: Division II
- Conference: Mountain East Conference
- Athletic director: Bryan Spitzer
- Location: Fairmont, West Virginia
- Varsity teams: 17
- Football stadium: Duvall-Rosier Field
- Basketball arena: Joe Retton Arena
- Baseball stadium: Dale Miller Field at Mylan Park
- Soccer stadium: Duvall-Rosier Field
- Colors: Maroon and White
- Mascot: Freddie
- Website: fightingfalcons.com
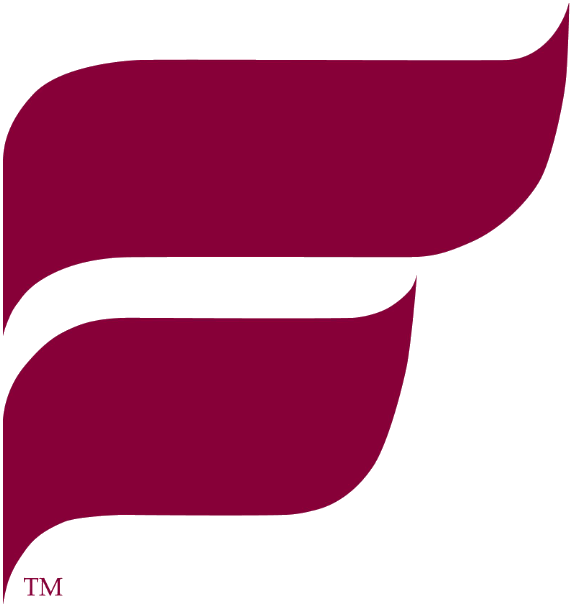

The Fairmont State Fighting Falcons are the athletic teams that represent Fairmont State University, located in Fairmont, West Virginia, in NCAA Division II intercollegiate sports. The Falcons compete as members of the Mountain East Conference.

== Varsity teams ==
Men's sports	Women's sports
Baseball	Acrobatics and tumbling
Basketball	Basketball
Cross country	Basketball
Football	Golf
Golf	Lacrosse
Swimming	Soccer
Tennis	Softball
Wrestling	Swimming
	Tennis

== National championships ==
=== Team ===
Sport	Association	Division	Year	Opponent/Runner-up	Score
Football (1)	NAIA	Single	1967	Eastern Washington State	28–21
