= Lincoln Memorial Railsplitters =

- University: Lincoln Memorial University
- Conference: South Atlantic (primary); Conference Carolinas (bowling); Independent (men's volleyball)
- NCAA: Division II
- Athletic director: Travis Muncy
- Location: Harrogate, Tennessee
- First season: 1907
- Varsity teams: 24 (11 men's, 12 women's, 1 co-ed)
- Basketball arena: B. Frank "Tex" Turner Arena
- Baseball stadium: Lamar Hennon Field
- Softball stadium: Dorothy Neely Softball Complex
- Soccer stadium: LMU Soccer Complex
- Lacrosse stadium: LMU Lacrosse Complex
- Tennis venue: LMU Tennis Complex
- Nickname: Railsplitters
- Colors: Dark Blue and Light Gray
- Website: lmurailsplitters.com
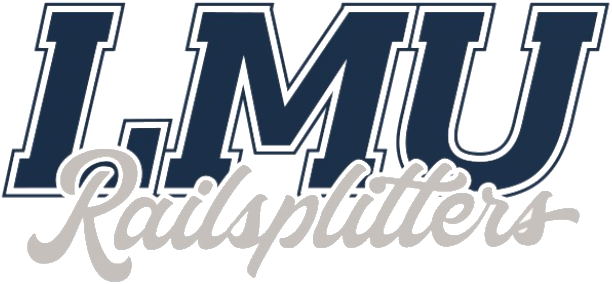

The Lincoln Memorial Railsplitters are the athletic teams that represent Lincoln Memorial University, located in Harrogate, Tennessee, in NCAA Division II intercollegiate sports. The Railsplitters compete as members of the South Atlantic Conference (SAC) for most varsity sports, although the bowling team competes in the Conference Carolinas (CC) and the men's volleyball program plays as an independent. Field hockey and men's wrestling, two of three sports to be added in 2021–22, will compete in South Atlantic Conference Carolinas, an alliance between the SAC and CC that operates in those two sports, with the SAC operating the field hockey championship and CC operating the men's wrestling championship. LMU will thus become a de facto CC men's wrestling affiliate at that time. The third sport to be added in 2021–22 is women's wrestling, newly added to the NCAA Emerging Sports for Women program for 2020–21.

== History ==
Athletics have been a part of LMU since 1907, when baseball was first organized on campus. The first intercollegiate contest was a baseball game against Cumberland College in 1910.

From 1991 to 2006 LMU was a member of the Gulf South Conference. Prior to that, the school was a member of the National Association of Intercollegiate Athletics and competed in the Smoky Mountain Athletic Conference (1929–1961) and Volunteer State/Tennessee Valley Athletic Conference (1946–1989).

Over the years the teams have enjoyed great success on the field and in the classroom. Academically, the 2000–01 women's basketball team led the NCAA Division II in team GPA and both soccer teams' 3.0 or better cumulative GPA have won them recognition from the NSCAA for the past few years.

In November 2019, LMU hired its first ever African American Athletics Director in Jasher Cox.

== Conference affiliations ==
NAIA

- Smoky Mountain Conference (1929–1961)
- Volunteer State Athletic Conference (1946–1989)

NCAA

- Gulf South Conference (1991–2006)
- South Atlantic Conference (2006–present)

== Varsity teams ==
=== List of teams ===
Men's sports

- Baseball
- Basketball
- Bowling
- Cross country
- Golf
- Lacrosse
- Soccer
- Tennis
- Track and field (Note: The NCAA considers indoor and outdoor track & field, both sponsored by LMU, to be two separate sports. NCAA championships in indoor track are held in the organization's winter season, with outdoor championships held in the spring season.)
- Volleyball
- Wrestling

Women's sports

- Basketball
- Beach volleyball
- Bowling
- Cross country
- Field hockey
- Golf
- Lacrosse
- Soccer
- Softball
- Tennis
- Track and field
- Volleyball
- Wrestling

=== Former teams ===
LMU does not have a football program, though it did have one in the past. Other sports formerly offered at LMU include fencing and tumbling.

=== Facilities ===
Facilities include the Turner Arena, Mars Gymnasium, Neely Field and Hennon Field. The golf teams are based out of Woodlake Golf Club in Tazewell, Tennessee. New soccer and tennis complexes are currently under construction.

== Individual teams ==
The men's and women's basketball, baseball, tennis, golf, cross-country and soccer teams have all made appearances in their respective national tournaments over the years. The men's soccer team reached the NCAA Division II Championship Match in 2007, losing to Franklin Pierce College 1–0. In 2016, the men's basketball team reached the NCAA Division II National Championship game, losing 90–81 to Augustana University. In 2019, the Men’s Golf Team reached the NCAA Division II National Championship game, losing to Lynn University 3–2.
