= Conference Carolinas men's basketball tournament =

- Conference basketball championship
- Sport: Basketball
- Conference: Conference Carolinas
- Number of teams: 8
- Format: Single-elimination tournament
- Played: 1936, 1941–1943, 1947–present
- Current champion: Young Harris (1st)
- Most championships: High Point (12)
- Official website: CC men's basketball

The Conference Carolinas men's basketball tournament is the annual conference basketball championship tournament for Conference Carolinas (formerly the North State Intercollegiate Conference, Carolinas Intercollegiate Athletic Conference, and the Carolinas-Virginia Athletics Conference). The tournament has been held annually since 1936 with two gaps between 1937–40 and 1944–46. It is a single-elimination tournament and seeding is based on regular season records.

The winner receives the conference's automatic bid to the NCAA Men's Division II Basketball Championship.

== Results ==
Year	Champions	Score	Runner-up	Venue
1936	High Point	49–39	Lenoir–Rhyne	High Point, NC
1937	Not held			
1938	Not held			
1939	Not held			
1940	Not held			
1941	Appalachian State	51–40	Catawba	High Point, NC
1942	High Point	50–34	Appalachian State	High Point, NC
1943	Appalachian State	36–31	Western Carolina	High Point, NC
1944	Not held			
1945	Not held			
1946	Not held			
1947	Elon	53–51	Western Carolina	High Point, NC
1948	Appalachian State	74–59	High Point	Elkin, NC
1949	Lenoir–Rhyne	57–55	Appalachian State	Elkin, NC
1950	Appalachian State	67–53	Elon	Statesville, NC
1951	High Point	66–62	East Carolina	Statesville, NC
1952	Lenoir–Rhyne	74–59	High Point	Statesville, NC
1953	High Point	66–63	Elon	Winston-Salem, NC
1954	East Carolina	86–75	Atlantic Christian	Lexington, NC
1955	Atlantic Christian	108–85	Lenoir–Rhyne	Lexington, NC
1956	Elon	71–67	Lenoir–Rhyne	Lexington, NC
1957	Lenoir–Rhyne	71–58	Western Carolina	Lexington, NC
1958	Lenoir–Rhyne	79–64	High Point	Lexington, NC
1959	Western Carolina	39–36	Catawba	Lexington, NC
1960	Catawba	59–57^{OT}	Lenoir–Rhyne	Lexington, NC
1961	High Point †	88–73	Atlantic Christian	Lexington, NC
1962	Western Carolina	69–58	High Point	Lexington, NC
1963	Lenoir–Rhyne	63–47	High Point	Lexington, NC
1964	Lenoir–Rhyne	31–30	High Point	Lexington, NC
1965	Elon	67–60	High Point	Lexington, NC
1966	High Point	59–55	Appalachian State	Lexington, NC
1967	Appalachian State	91–67	Guilford	Lexington, NC
1968	Guilford	80–73	Catawba	Winston-Salem, NC
1969	High Point	80–67	Newberry	Winston-Salem, NC
1970	Guilford	66–61	Elon	Winston-Salem, NC
1971	Elon	58–57	Guilford	Winston-Salem, NC
1972	Elon	83–69	Guilford	Elon, NC
1973	Catawba	72–69	Guilford	Lexington, NC
1974	Lenoir–Rhyne	65–63	Mars Hill	Lexington, NC
1975	Pfeiffer	61–58	High Point	Lexington, NC
1976	Guilford	89–74	Catawba	Lexington, NC
1977	Catawba	67–65^{OT}	Pembroke State	Lexington, NC
1978	High Point	82–80	Guilford	Lexington, NC
1979	High Point	54–51	Pfeiffer	Salisbury, NC
1980	Catawba	10–9	High Point	Salisbury, NC
1981	Pembroke State	63–61	Wingate	Salisbury, NC
1982	Pembroke State	77–76	Catawba	Salisbury, NC
1983	Catawba	82–75	Pembroke State	Elon, NC
1984	Pembroke State	73–62	Wingate	Elon, NC
1985	Lenoir–Rhyne	62–58	Catawba	Salisbury, NC
1986	Pembroke State	85–81^{OT}	Atlantic Christian	Salisbury, NC
1987	High Point	56–51	Elon	Salisbury, NC
1988	High Point	67–64	Wingate	Salisbury, NC
1989	High Point	97–92	Wingate	High Point, NC
1990	Pembroke State	86–82	Pfeiffer	High Point, NC
1991	Pfeiffer	110–96	Pembroke State	High Point, NC
1992	Pfeiffer	98–59	High Point	Misenheimer, NC
1993	Pfeiffer	69–62	Mount Olive	Misenheimer, NC
1994	Pfeiffer	76–67	High Point	Misenheimer, NC
1995	Pfeiffer	84–79	High Point	Misenheimer, NC
1996	Queens (NC)	86–73^{OT}	High Point	High Point, NC
1997	High Point	71–68	Queens (NC)	High Point, NC
1998	Queens (NC)	63–55	Barton	Fort Mill, SC
1999	Queens (NC)	78–72	Pfeiffer	Fort Mill, SC
2000	St. Andrews (NC)	82–81	Pfeiffer	Fort Mill, SC
2001	Longwood	80–65	Queens (NC)	Fort Mill, SC
2002	Belmont Abbey	78–60	Queens (NC)	Fort Mill, SC
2003	Belmont Abbey	73–68	Pfeiffer	Misenheimer, NC
2004	Pfeiffer	106–95	Mount Olive	Due West, SC
2005	Pfeiffer	98–84	Mount Olive	Gaffney, SC
2006	Barton	102–100^{2OT}	Mount Olive	Mount Olive, NC
2007	Barton	92–80	Mount Olive	Misenheimer, NC
2008	Mount Olive	90–82	Queens (NC)	Mount Olive, NC
2009	Barton	65–52	Erskine	Wilson, NC
2010	Mount Olive	83–80	Anderson (SC)	Mount Olive, NC
2011	Limestone	68–59	Barton	Gaffney, SC
2012	Barton	67–60	Mount Olive	Mount Olive, NC
2013	Belmont Abbey	67–55	Limestone	Gaffney, SC
2014	Limestone	69–54	King (TN)	Concord, NC
2015	North Greenville	68–66	Mount Olive	Mount Olive, NC
2016	King (TN)	85–53	Barton	Bristol, TN
2017	Limestone	76–70	King (TN)	Misenheimer, NC
2018	Lees–McRae	75–72	Belmont Abbey	Banner Elk, NC
2019	Emmanuel	75–72	Belmont Abbey	Franklin Springs, GA
2020	Southern Wesleyan	78–68	Belmont Abbey	Spartanburg, SC
2021	Belmont Abbey	82–70	Emmanuel	Franklin Springs, GA
2022	Belmont Abbey	79–73	UNC Pembroke	Spartanburg, SC
2023	Emmanuel	77–60	Belmont Abbey	Spartanburg, SC
2024	UNC Pembroke	82–81 (OT)	Emmanuel	Spartanburg, SC
2025	UNC Pembroke	107–91	Emmanuel	Spartanburg, SC
2026	Young Harris	82–79	Chowan	Spartanburg, SC

== Championship records ==
School	Finals Record	Finals Appearances	Years
High Point	12–13	25	1936, 1942, 1951, 1953, 1961, 1966, 1969, 1978, 1979, 1987, 1988, 1989, 1997
Pfeiffer	8–5	13	1975, 1991, 1992, 1993, 1994, 1995, 2004, 2005
Lenoir–Rhyne	8–4	12	1949, 1952, 1957, 1958, 1963, 1964, 1974, 1985
UNC Pembroke (Pembroke State)	7–4	11	1981, 1982, 1984, 1986, 1990, 2024, 2025
Barton (Atlantic Christian)	5–6	11	1955, 2006, 2007, 2009, 2012
Catawba	5–6	11	1960, 1973, 1977, 1980, 1983
Belmont Abbey	5–4	9	2002, 2003, 2013, 2021, 2022
Elon	5–4	9	1947, 1956, 1965, 1971, 1972
Appalachian State	5–3	8	1941, 1943, 1948, 1950, 1967
Guilford	3–5	8	1968, 1970, 1976
Limestone	3–1	4	2011, 2014, 2017
Queens (NC)	3–4	7	1996, 1998, 1999
Emmanuel	2–3	5	2019, 2023
Western Carolina	2–3	5	1959, 1962
Mount Olive	2–7	9	2008, 2010
King (TN)	1–2	3	2016
East Carolina	1–1	2	1954
Young Harris	1–0	1	2026
Southern Wesleyan	1–0	1	2020
Lees–McRae	1–0	1	2018
Longwood	1–0	1	2001
North Greenville	1–0	1	2015
St. Andrews (NC)	1–0	1	2000
Wingate	0–4	4	
Anderson (SC)	0–1	1	
Chowan	0–1	1	
Erskine	0–1	1	
Newberry	0–1	1	
Mars Hill	0–1	1	

- Former CC members are highlighted in pink.
- Converse, Ferrum, Francis Marion, and Shorter have yet to reach the tournament final.
- Presbyterian and Coker never reached the tournament finals before departing the conference.

== See also ==
- Conference Carolinas women's basketball tournament
