= Conference Carolinas women's basketball tournament =

- Conference basketball championship
- Sport: Basketball
- Conference: Conference Carolinas
- Number of teams: 8
- Format: Single-elimination tournament
- Played: 1996–present
- Current champion: Lees–McRae (1st)
- Most championships: Belmont Abbey (7)
- Official website: CC women's basketball

The Conference Carolinas women's basketball tournament is the annual conference women's basketball championship tournament for Conference Carolinas.

The tournament has been held annually since 1996. It is a single-elimination tournament and seeding is based on regular season records.

The winner receives Conference Carolina'a automatic bid to the NCAA Women's Division II Basketball Championship.

== Results ==
Year	Champions	Score	Runner-up
1996	High Point	Record unavailable	
1997	High Point (2)	84–60	Longwood
1998	Belmont Abbey	Record unavailable	
1999	Belmont Abbey (2)	90–70	Lees-McRae
2000	Belmont Abbey (3)	98–92	Longwood
2001	Belmont Abbey (4)	90–70	Limestone
2002	Belmont Abbey (5)	89–64	Longwood
2003	Longwood	85–61	Lees-McRae
2004	Anderson	78–63	Coker
2005	Anderson (2)	85–67	Belmont Abbey
2006	Anderson (3)	83–80	Barton
2007	Pfeiffer	67–54	Anderson
2008	Anderson (4)	83–60	Mount Olive
2009	Anderson (5)	83–60	Mount Olive
2010	Anderson (6)	62–52	Queens (NC)
2011	Barton	83–68	Mount Olive
2012	Limestone	74–61	Barton
2013	Mount Olive	79–74 (OT)	Pfeiffer
2014	Limestone (2)	61–41	Mount Olive
2015	Limestone (3)	64–45	Mount Olive
2016	Limestone (4)	56–53	King (TN)
2017	King (TN)	78–77	Limestone
2018	Barton (2)	83–68	King (TN)
2019	Emmanuel	69–57	Belmont Abbey
2020	Limestone (5)	67–65	Barton
2021	Belmont Abbey (6)	68–62 (OT)	Barton
2022	Barton (3)	77–58	Francis Marion
2023	UNC Pembroke (1)	56–46	Belmont Abbey
2024	UNC Pembroke (2)	72–51	Belmont Abbey
2025	Belmont Abbey (7)	63–62	Francis Marion
2026	Lees–McRae	67–60	Chowan

== Championship records ==
School	Finals Record	Finals Appearances	Years
Belmont Abbey	7–4	11	1998, 1999, 2000, 2001, 2002, 2021, 2025
Anderson (SC)	6–1	7	2004, 2005, 2006, 2008, 2009, 2010
Limestone	5–2	7	2012, 2014, 2015, 2016, 2020
Barton (Atlantic Christian)	3–4	7	2011, 2018, 2022
UNC Pembroke	2–0	2	2023, 2024
High Point	2–0	2	1996, 1997
Mount Olive	1–5	6	2013
King (TN)	1–2	3	2017
Longwood	1–2	3	2003
Lees–McRae	1–1	2	2026
Pfeiffer	1–1	2	2007
Emmanuel	1–0	1	2019
Francis Marion	0–2	2	
Chowan	0–1	1	
Coker	0–1	1	
Queens (NC)	0–1	1	

- Former CC members are highlighted in pink.
- Converse, Erksine, Ferrum, North Greenville, Shorter, Southern Wesleyan, and Young Harris have yet to reach the tournament final.
- St. Andrews never reached the tournament finals before departing the conference.

== See also ==
- Conference Carolinas men's basketball tournament
