= South Atlantic Conference men's basketball tournament =

- Conference basketball championship
- Sport: Basketball
- Conference: South Atlantic Conference
- Number of teams: 8
- Format: Single-elimination tournament
- Played: 1992–present
- Current champion: Anderson (SC) (1st)
- Most championships: Catawba (9)
- Official website: SAC men's basketball

The South Atlantic Conference men's basketball tournament is the annual conference basketball championship tournament for the South Atlantic Conference. The tournament has been held annually since 1992. It is a single-elimination tournament and seeding is based on regular season records.

The winner receives the South Atlantic's automatic bid to the NCAA Men's Division II Basketball Championship.

== Results ==
Year	Champions	Score	Runner-up	Tournament MVP
1992	Lenoir–Rhyne	72–66	Presbyterian	None selected
1993	Lenoir–Rhyne	79–70	Presbyterian	None selected
1994	Carson–Newman	79–64	Lenoir–Rhyne	None selected
1995	Lenoir–Rhyne	52–50	Presbyterian	None selected
1996	Presbyterian	82–77	Mars Hill	None selected
1997	Elon	62–59	Lenoir–Rhyne	None selected
1998	Catawba	95–74	Wingate	None selected
1999	Catawba	78–75 (OT)	Carson–Newman	Marvin Moore, Catawba
2000	Wingate	82–72	Gardner–Webb	Brandon Harris, Wingate
2001	Catawba	76–61	Presbyterian	Kevin Petty, Catawba
2002	Carson–Newman	76–62	Wingate	Kyle Gribble, Carson-Newman
2003	Lenoir–Rhyne	71–62	Presbyterian	Roman Davis, Lenoir–Rhyne
2004	Catawba	81–68	Newberry	Helgi Magnússon, Catawba
2005	Tusculum	79–73	Lenoir–Rhyne	Donald Sexton, Tusculum
2006	Wingate	61–50	Presbyterian	Sean Barnette, Wingate
2007	Wingate	97–82	Catawba	Sean Barnette, Wingate
2008	Catawba	54–52	Mars Hill	Antonio Houston, Catawba
2009	Catawba	63–61	Tusculum	Antonio Houston, Catawba
2010	Brevard	93–92	Catawba	Jonathan Whitson, Brevard
2011	Lincoln Memorial	68–58	Wingate	D'Mario Curry, Lincoln Memorial
2012	Wingate	66–59	Anderson (SC)	Denzail Jones, Anderson
2013	Wingate	69–53	Lincoln Memorial	Paidrick Matilus, Wingate
2014	Lincoln Memorial	76–71	Anderson (SC)	Chandler Hash, Anderson
2015	Carson–Newman	63–48	Lincoln Memorial	Charles Clark, Carson–Newman
2016	Lincoln Memorial	95–83	Wingate	Luquon Choice, Lincoln Memorial
2017	Queens (NC)	75–72	Lincoln Memorial	Daniel Camps, Queens
2018	Lincoln Memorial	77–75	Queens (NC)	Dorian Pinson, Lincoln Memorial
2019	Catawba	71–67	Lenoir-Rhyne	Devin Cooper, Catawba
2020	Lincoln Memorial	75–68	Queens	Devin Whitefield, Lincoln Memorial
2021	Carson-Newman	88–79	Queens	EJ Bush, Carson-Newman
2022	Queens (NC)	69–59	Carson-Newman	Kenny Dye, Queens (NC)
2023	Catawba	101–69	UVA Wise	Javeon Jones, Catawba
2024	Catawba	61–60	Lincoln Memorial	Peyton Gerald, Catawba
2025	Lenoir–Rhyne	82–78 (OT)	Lincoln Memorial	Ziare Wells, Lenoir–Rhyne
2026	Anderson (SC)	78–75	Catawba	AJ Wright Jr., Anderson

== Championship records ==
School	Championships	Years
Catawba	9	1998, 1999, 2001, 2004, 2008, 2009, 2019, 2023, 2024
Lenoir–Rhyne	5	1992, 1993, 1995, 2003, 2025
Lincoln Memorial	5	2011, 2014, 2016, 2018, 2020
Wingate	5	2000, 2006, 2007, 2012, 2013
Carson–Newman	4	1994, 2002, 2015, 2021
Queens (NC)	2	2017, 2022
Anderson	1	2026
Brevard	1	2010
Elon	1	1997
Presbyterian	1	1996
Tusculum	1	2005

- Coker, Emory & Henry, Mars Hill, Newberry, and UVA Wise have not yet won the SAC tournament.
- Schools highlighted in pink are former SAC members.

== See also ==
- South Atlantic Conference women's basketball tournament
