= South Atlantic Conference women's basketball tournament =

- Conference basketball championship
- Sport: Basketball
- Conference: South Atlantic Conference
- Number of teams: 12
- Format: Single-elimination tournament
- Played: 1991–present
- Current champion: Coker (1st)
- Most championships: Wingate (10)
- Official website: SAC women's basketball

The South Atlantic Conference women's basketball tournament is the annual conference women's basketball championship tournament for the South Atlantic Conference. The tournament has been held annually since 1991. It is a single-elimination tournament and seeding is based on regular season records.

The tournament champion receives the South Atlantic's automatic bid to the NCAA Women's Division II Basketball Championship.

== Results ==
| Year | Champions | Score | Runner-up |
|---|---|---|---|
| 1991 | Wingate | 71–68 | Gardner–Webb |
| 1992 | Wingate (2) | 70–69 | Gardner–Webb |
| 1993 | Catawba | 60–57 | Wingate |
| 1994 | Wingate (3) | 73–62 | Mars Hill |
| 1995 | Presbyterian | 74–68 | Carson-Newman |
| 1996 | Wingate (4) | 69–67 (OT) | Mars Hill |
| 1997 | Wingate (5) | 71–56 | Elon |
| 1998 | Presbyterian (2) | 79–54 | Carson-Newman |
| 1999 | Presbyterian (3) | 69–66 | Carson-Newman |
| 2000 | Presbyterian (4) | 72–52 | Gardner–Webb |
| 2001 | Catawba (2) | 82–72 | Wingate |
| 2002 | Mars Hill | 85–71 | Presbyterian |
| 2003 | Lenoir-Rhyne | 77–75 | Catawba |
| 2004 | Catawba (3) | 74–70 | Wingate |
| 2005 | Carson-Newman | 64–43 | Wingate |
| 2006 | Newberry | 57–50 | Tusculum |
| 2007 | Newberry (2) | 67–62 | Carson-Newman |
| 2008 | Wingate (6) | 76–74 | Tusculum |
| 2009 | Lenoir-Rhyne (2) | 66–57 | Tusculum |
| 2010 | Tusculum | 67–55 | Newberry |
| 2011 | Tusculum (2) | 77–66 | Wingate |
| 2012 | Wingate† | 65–41 | Catawba |
| 2013 | Anderson | 55–52 | Tusculum |
| 2014 | Wingate (7) | 77–73 | Lenoir-Rhyne |
| 2015 | Newberry (3) | 64–58 | Anderson |
| 2016 | Wingate (8) | 67–61 | Anderson |
| 2017 | Wingate (9) | 81–61 | Lincoln Memorial |
| 2018 | Carson-Newman (2) | 79–70 | Wingate |
| 2019 | Anderson (2) | 62–60 | Wingate |
| 2020 | Tusculum (3) | 61–49 | Anderson |
| 2021 | Tusculum (4) | 59–47 | Lincoln Memorial |
| 2022 | Carson-Newman (3) | 83–58 | Anderson (SC) |
| 2023 | Lenoir–Rhyne (3) | 63–59 | Anderson (SC) |
| 2024 | Wingate (10) | 85–69 | Carson-Newman |
| 2025 | Anderson (3) | 64–58 | Coker |
| 2026 | Coker | 60–46 | Carson-Newman |

=== Notes ===
- † Wingate's championship from 2012 has been vacated.

== Championship records ==
| School | Finals Record | Finals Appearances | Years |
|---|---|---|---|
| Wingate | 10–7 | 17 | 1991, 1992, 1994, 1996, 1997, 2008, 2014, 2016, 2017, 2024 |
| Tusculum | 4–4 | 8 | 2010, 2011, 2020, 2021 |
| Presbyterian | 4–1 | 5 | 1995, 1998, 1999, 2000 |
| Anderson (SC) | 3–5 | 8 | 2013, 2019, 2025 |
| Carson–Newman | 3–6 | 9 | 2005, 2013, 2022 |
| Catawba | 3–2 | 5 | 1993, 2001, 2004 |
| Lenoir–Rhyne | 3–1 | 4 | 2003, 2009, 2023 |
| Newberry | 3–1 | 4 | 2006, 2007, 2015 |
| Mars Hill | 1–2 | 3 | 2002 |
| Coker | 1–1 | 2 | 2026 |
| Gardner–Webb | 0–3 | 3 | |
| Lincoln Memorial | 0–2 | 2 | |
| Elon | 0–1 | 1 | |

- Emory & Henry, Limestone, and UVA Wise have not yet reached the finals of the SAC tournament.
- Brevard and Queens (NC) never reached the finals of the tournament while members of the SAC.
- Schools highlighted in pink are former SAC members.

== See also ==
- South Atlantic Conference men's basketball tournament
