= Sean Barnette =

American professional basketball player

Personal information
- Born: June 25, 1986 (age 40)
- Listed height: 6 ft 6 in (1.98 m)
- Listed weight: 220 lb (100 kg)

Career information
- High school: Northwestern (Rock Hill, South Carolina)
- College: Wingate (2004–2008)
- NBA draft: 2008: undrafted
- Playing career: 2008–2021
- Position: Small forward

Career history
- 2008–2009: Saint-Vallier Drôme
- 2009–2010: Iowa Energy
- 2010: Fort Wayne Mad Ants
- 2010–2011: Lille Métropole
- 2011–2012: Lions de Genève
- 2012: PrimeTime Players
- 2012–2013: U Mobitelco Cluj-Napoca
- 2013–2014: Rilski Sportist
- 2014–2015: U-BT Cluj-Napoca
- 2015: Lugano Tigers
- 2015–2017: CSM Oradea
- 2017–2018: Tadamon Zouk
- 2018–2020: CSM Oradea
- 2020–2021: Fribourg Olympic Basket

Career highlights
- NBA D-League champion (2010); 2× SAC Player of the Year (2007, 2008); 3× First-team All-SAC (2006–2008); SAC Freshman of the Year (2005); 2× SAC tournament MVP (2007, 2008); Romanian Basketball League champion (2016)

Sean Barnette (born June 25, 1986) is an American professional basketball player who plays for Fribourg Olympic Basket of the Swiss Basketball League. He spent the 2019–20 season with CSM Oradea of the Romanian Basketball League, averaging 10.1 points, 4.7 rebounds, and 1.6 assists per game before season was suspended. Barnette signed with Fribourg Olympic on July 12, 2020.

== The Basketball Tournament ==
Beginning in 2015, Barnette has participated in The Basketball Tournament for team Primetime Players. The team won its first round match-up against Blue Zoo, a team of Middle Tennessee alumni in 2017, but lost in the second round to Ram Nation, a team of VCU alumni. In 2015 Barnette led the way as the PrimeTime Players cruised to a 94–66 upset over top-seeded TeamBDB in a game that ended early due to multiple ejections. Barnette led the team to the Super 17 Finals in Chicago before losing to Dirty South in the closing seconds. The Basketball Tournament is an annual $2 million winner-take-all tournament broadcast on ESPN.
