= 2008 NCAA Division III baseball tournament =

- Season: 2008
- Teams: 54
- Finals site: Time Warner Cable Field at Fox Cities Stadium; Grand Chute, Wisconsin
- Champions: Trinity (CT) (1st title)
- Runner-up: Johns Hopkins

The 2008 NCAA Division III baseball tournament was played at the end of the 2008 NCAA Division III baseball season to determine the 33rd national champion of college baseball at the NCAA Division III level. The tournament concluded with eight teams competing at Time Warner Cable Field at Fox Cities Stadium in Grand Chute, Wisconsin for the championship. Eight regional tournaments were held to determine the participants in the World Series. Regional tournaments were contested in double-elimination format, with five regions consisting of six teams and three consisting of eight, for a total of 54 teams participating in the tournament, up from 53 in 2007. The tournament champion was Trinity (CT), who defeated Johns Hopkins for the championship.

== Bids ==
The 54 competing teams were:

== Regionals ==
=== Mid-Atlantic Regional ===
Bears & Eagles Riverfront Stadium-Newark, NJ (Host: Kean University)

First round/elimination round 1	Second round/elimination round 2	Semifinals/elimination semifinals	Finals
4	Penn State-Behrend	1
5	Messiah	8
Messiah	1
Kean	7
1	Kean	8
8	Gwynedd-Mercy	6
Kean	12
TCNJ	8
3	TCNJ	3
6	DeSales	0
TCNJ	5
Rowan	2
2	Rowan	14
7	Keystone	9	Kean	8	--
Rowan	2	--
Lower round 1	Lower round 2	Lower round 3	Lower final
Rowan	17
Penn State-Behrend	3	Gwynedd-Mercy	2	TCNJ	2
Gwynedd-Mercy	5	Rowan	9	Rowan	5
Keystone	2
Messiah	3
DeSales	5	Keystone	9
Keystone	11

=== West Regional ===
Walt Driggers Field-Abilene, TX (Host: McMurry University)

First round
1	Chapman	4
6	La Verne	3
2	George Fox	1
5	Trinity (TX)	8
3	McMurry	7
4	Cal State East Bay	14

Second round/elimination round 1
Chapman	5
McMurry	3^{12}
Trinity (TX)	8
Cal State East Bay	3
La Verne	11
George Fox	6

Semifinals/elimination round 2
Chapman	10
Trinity (TX)	9
Cal State East Bay	6
La Verne	4

Elimination final
Trinity (TX)	9
Cal State East Bay	5

Final
Chapman	4	--
Trinity (TX)	3	--

=== South Regional ===
American Legion Field-Danville, GA (Host: USA South Athletic Conference/Old Dominion Athletic Conference)

First round
1	Salisbury	7
6	Randolph-Macon	4
2	Johns Hopkins	5
5	Christopher Newport	8^{10}
3	Piedmont	1
4	Lynchburg	9

Second round/elimination round 1
Salisbury	6
Piedmont	10
Randolph-Macon	8
Johns Hopkins	13
Christopher Newport	1
Lynchburg	12
Salisbury	5
Christopher Newport	1

Third round/elimination round 2
Piedmont	6
Johns Hopkins	13
Lynchburg	3
Salisbury	5

Elimination final
Johns Hopkins	7
Lynchburg	5

Final
Johns Hopkins	9
Salisbury	4

=== Mideast Regional ===
Art Nehf Field-Terre Haute, IN (Host: Rose-Hulman Institute of Technology)

First round
1	Heidelberg	10
6	Transylvania	3
2	Wooster	3
5	Adrian	4
3	Calvin	0
4	Rose-Hulman	4

Second round/elimination round 1
Heidelberg	4
Calvin	1
Adrian	4
Rose-Hulman	3
Wooster	6
Transylvania	3

Semifinals/elimination round 2
Heidelberg	1
Adrian	4
Rose-Hulman	8
Wooster	11^{13}

Elimination final
Heidelberg	1
Wooster	0

Final
Adrian	2	8
Heidelberg	8	7

=== Central Regional ===
Brunner Field in the Duane R. Swanson Stadium-Moline, IL (Host: Augustana College)

First round
1	Illinois Wesleyan	0
6	Webster	7
2	Wisconsin-Stevens Point	2
5	Linfield	1^{10}
3	Augustana	6
4	Wartburg	5

Second round/elimination round 1
Webster	0
Wartburg	2
Illinois Wesleyan	4
Linfield	5
Wisconsin-Stevens Point	3
Augustana	4
Webster	9
Wisconsin-Stevens Point	7

Third round/elimination round 2
Wartburg	5
Linfield	7
Augustana	13
Webster	14

Elimination final
Linfield	10
Augustana	1

Final
Linfield	4
Webster	3^{10}

=== Midwest Regional ===
E.J. Schneider Field-Oshkosh, WI (Host: University of Wisconsin-Oshkosh)

First round
1	St. Thomas (MN)	15
6	Knox	1
2	Wisconsin-Whitewater	7
5	St. Scholastica	4
3	Carthage	6
4	Wisconsin-Oshkosh	3

Second round/elimination round 1
St. Thomas (MN)	3
Wisconsin-Oshkosh	1
Wisconsin-Whitewater	24
Carthage	3
Knox	2
St. Scholastica	15

Semifinals/elimination round 2
St. Thomas (MN)	1
Wisconsin-Whitewater	4^{10}
Carthage	4
St. Scholastica	9

Elimination final
St. Thomas (MN)	1
St. Scholastica	7

Final
Wisconsin-Whitewater	21	--
St. Scholastica	13	--

=== New England Regional ===
Whitehouse Field-Harwich, MA (Host: Eastern College Athletic Conference)

First round/elimination round 1	Second round/elimination round 2	Semifinals/elimination semifinals	Finals
4	Southern Maine	6
5	Western New England	8^{12}
Western New England	2
Trinity (CT)	7
1	Trinity (CT)	9
8	Castleton State	5
Trinity (CT)	6
Wheaton (MA)	2
3	Keene State	6
6	St. Joseph's (ME)	1
Keene State	2
Wheaton (MA)	12
2	Wheaton (MA)	4
7	Worcester State	3^{12}	Trinity (CT)	10	--
Southern Maine	3	--
Lower round 1	Lower round 2	Lower round 3	Lower final
Keene State	0
Southern Maine	16	Southern Maine	8	Wheaton (MA)	3
Castleton State	7	Southern Maine	11	Southern Maine	9
Western New England	0
Western New England	8
St. Joseph's (ME)	4	Worcester State	3
Worcester State	14

=== New York Regional ===
Leo Pinckney Field at Falcon Park-Auburn, NY (Host: Ithaca College)

First round/elimination round 1	Second round/elimination round 2	Semifinals/elimination semifinals	Finals
4	Montclair State	8
5	Eastern Connecticut State	7
Montclair State	2
Cortland State	9
1	Cortland State	10
8	Grove City	1
Cortland State	9
Rensselaer	5
3	Rensselaer	7
6	Farmingdale State	6
Rensselaer	9
Ohio Wesleyan	6
2	Ithaca	3
7	Ohio Wesleyan	5	Cortland State	6	--
Rensselaer	2	--
Lower round 1	Lower round 2	Lower round 3	Lower final
Ohio Wesleyan	1
Eastern Connecticut State	10	Eastern Connecticut State	5	Rensselaer	14
Grove City	5	Eastern Connecticut State	14	Eastern Connecticut State	13^{10}
Montclair State	0
Montclair State	7
Farmingdale State	0	Ithaca	6
Ithaca	4

== World Series ==
Time Warner Cable Field at Fox Cities Stadium-Grand Chute, WI (Host: University of Wisconsin-Oshkosh/Lawrence University/Fox Cities Convention and Visitors Bureau)

First round/elimination round 1	Second round/elimination round 2	Semifinals/elimination semifinals	Finals
MA1	Kean	2
W1	Chapman	4
Chapman	4
Johns Hopkins	5
S2	Johns Hopkins	3
ME5	Adrian	2^{14}
Johns Hopkins	5
Trinity (CT)	8
C5	Linfield	5
MW2	Wisconsin-Whitewater	1
Linfield	5
Trinity (CT)	6
NE1	Trinity (CT)	2
NY1	Cortland State	1	Trinity (CT)	3	5
Johns Hopkins	4	4
Lower round 1	Lower round 2	Lower round 3	Lower final
Linfield	2
Kean	6	Adrian	3	Johns Hopkins	12
Adrian	7^{12}	Adrian	11	Wisconsin-Whitewater	11
Wisconsin-Whitewater	13
Chapman	4
Wisconsin-Whitewater	10	Wisconsin-Whitewater	7
Cortland State	2

== See also ==
- 2008 NCAA Division I baseball tournament
- 2008 NCAA Division II baseball tournament
- 2008 NAIA World Series
