= Pioneer Field (Tusculum) =

- Interactive map of Pioneer Field
- Full name: Pioneer Field
- Address: 60 Shiloh Road; Tusculum, Tennessee
- Coordinates: 36.172335°N 82.757285°W
- Owner: Tusculum College
- Capacity: 3,500
- Surface: Bermuda grass

Construction
- Opened: 1965
- Renovated: 2000

Tenant
- Tusculum Pioneers (NCAA) (1991–present)

Website
- Pioneer Field

Pioneer Field is a 3,500-seat college football stadium located in Tusculum, Tennessee. The stadium is the home of the Pioneers football team of Tusculum College. The Pioneers compete in the National Collegiate Athletic Association (NCAA) Division II South Atlantic Conference (SAC).
