= South Atlantic Conference =

American college athletic conference

- Association: NCAA
- Founded: 1975
- Commissioner: Patrick Britz (since 2008)
- Sports fielded: 23; men's: 11; women's: 13
- Division: Division II
- No. of teams: 12
- Headquarters: Rock Hill, South Carolina
- Region: Southeastern United States
- Website: thesac.com

Locations
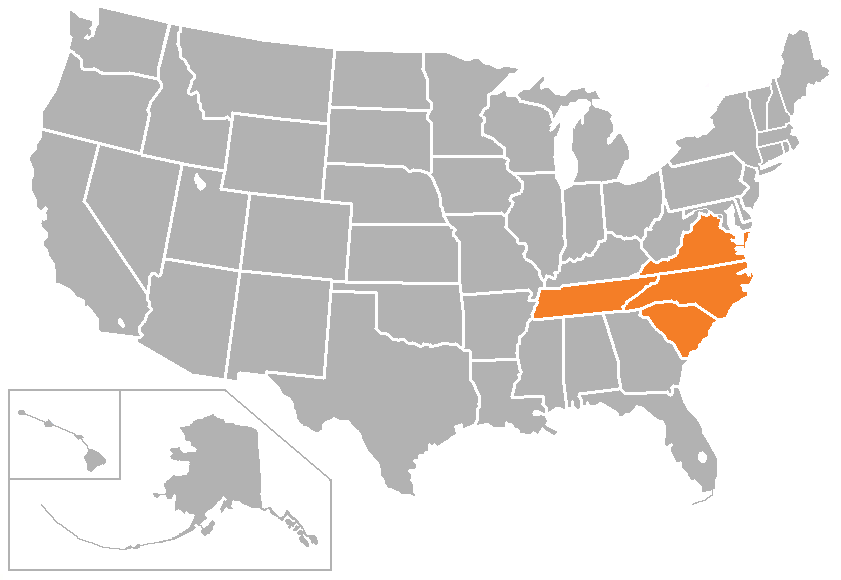

The South Atlantic Conference (SAC) is a college athletic conference affiliated with the National Collegiate Athletic Association (NCAA) at the Division II level, which operates in the southeastern United States. The SAC was founded in 1975 as a football-only conference and became an all-sports conference beginning with the 1989–90 season.

The league currently sponsors 11 sports for men (football, cross country, soccer, basketball, baseball, lacrosse, indoor track & field, outdoor track & field, tennis, golf, and swimming) and 13 sports for women (volleyball, beach volleyball, cross country, field hockey, soccer, basketball, lacrosse, indoor track & field, outdoor track & field, softball, tennis, golf, and swimming).

== History ==
South Atlantic Conference
Location of SAC members: current

The distant forerunner of the South Atlantic Conference was the North State Intercollegiate Athletic Conference (NSIAC). The NSIAC was formed when the "Little Six", as it was called, broke from the North Carolina Intercollegiate Athletic Conference in 1930. The charter members included Appalachian State Teachers College (now Appalachian State University), Lenoir–Rhyne College (now Lenoir–Rhyne University), Atlantic Christian College (now Barton College), Catawba College, Guilford College, Elon College (now Elon University), and High Point College (now High Point University).

The North State continued to grow over the next 30 years, adding Western Carolina University (1933), East Carolina University (1947) and Pfeiffer College (now Pfeiffer University; 1960). A name change became necessary when the league accepted Newberry College as its first member from the state of South Carolina in 1961. The league took on the name Carolinas Intercollegiate Athletic Conference (CIAC) on May 20 of that year.

The CIAC saw several changes in the following years as East Carolina withdrew from the league in 1962. Appalachian State and Western Carolina followed in 1971 and 1976. All three landed in the Southern Conference (SoCon).

The South Atlantic Conference was founded in 1975 solely as a football conference. The league received its name from a contest in which Kurt Brenneman of Greensboro, North Carolina became the first to submit the SAC-8 moniker.

The SAC-8 consisted of Carson–Newman College (now Carson–Newman University), Catawba College, Elon College, Gardner–Webb College (now Gardner–Webb University), Lenoir–Rhyne College (now Lenoir-Rhyne University), Mars Hill College (now Mars Hill University), Newberry College, and Presbyterian College. Dr. Fred Bentley, of Mars Hill College, was named league president for its inaugural year, by a vote of the member institutions.

After the first season of play in the SAC-8, the Bears of Lenoir–Rhyne College captured the first football title.

In 1989, the league's 15th year of operation, the South Atlantic Conference became a comprehensive, multi-sport conference. Doug Echols was named the league's first Commissioner. That year the South Atlantic Conference sponsored 10 sports – football, men's and women's basketball, baseball, softball, men's soccer, volleyball, men's golf, men's and women's tennis. Later the conference grew to 14 championship sports by adding women's soccer (1990), men's and women's cross country (1993) and women's golf (1999). In 2013, the sports of men's and women's lacrosse and men's and women's track and field were added, increasing the number of championship sports to 18.

The South Atlantic Conference was composed of the same eight member institutions from 1975–76 until 1988–89, when Wingate College (now Wingate University) replaced Newberry College as the eighth member institution. Newberry College later re-joined the conference in the 1996–97 season.

In July 1998, Tusculum College (now Tusculum University) was admitted as a member of the league, and Lincoln Memorial University began play in the conference in the 2006–07 academic year. Brevard College was admitted to the SAC as a provisional member in 2007 and a full member in 2008.

In 2008, Echols retired after serving as Commissioner for 19 years and Patrick Britz was hired as the new Commissioner.

In July 2010, Anderson University became the league's 10th member. Three years later in July 2013, Coker College (now Coker University) and Queens University of Charlotte joined the conference. On April 13, 2018, UVA Wise (in full, the University of Virginia's College at Wise) announced that it was joining the South Atlantic Conference for the 2019-20 season. A more recent change to the conference membership was announced on April 5, 2019, when Limestone College, which had joined as a football-only member in 2017 and added field hockey to its SAC membership the next year, was announced as a new full member effective in 2020–21, the same time it became Limestone University.

The SAC and Conference Carolinas entered into a partnership in the 2018–19 school year by which the two leagues would operate as a single conference in field hockey and men's wrestling, with championships immediately conducted in both sports. The leagues agreed that the SAC would coordinate the field hockey championship, while CC would fill the same role for men's wrestling. Accordingly, all CC field hockey programs became SAC affiliates, and all SAC men's wrestling programs became CC affiliates. The SAC–CC alliance is officially branded as "South Atlantic Conference Carolinas".

A more recent change in conference membership was announced on November 17, 2020. Emory & Henry College, now a university, then in the Division III Old Dominion Athletic Conference, started a transition to Division II in July 2021 and began SAC competition in 2022.

In December 2021, the SAC and CC jointly announced that they would extend their existing partnership to include two women's sports, triathlon and wrestling, with triathlon competition starting in 2022–23 and wrestling in 2023–24. At the same time, both conferences agreed that after the 2021–22 school year, the SAC would become the only one of the two conferences to sponsor field hockey. The joint men's wrestling league will continue to operate through the 2022–23 season, after which both conferences will establish their own men's wrestling leagues.

The most recent change was officially announced on May 10, 2022, when the Division I Atlantic Sun Conference (then branded as the ASUN Conference) announced that Queens would leave the SAC to start a transition to D-I on July 1 as a new ASUN member.

Starting in 2023–24, the SACC men's wrestling league was dissolved. Originally the intent was for the SAC and CC to each begin their own wrestling league; however, all the SAC schools that sponsored wrestling instead became CC affiliates in that sport. At the same time, the SACC partnership added beach volleyball and women's wrestling.

=== Chronological timeline ===
- 1975 – The South Atlantic Conference (SAC) was founded as a football-only conference. Charter members included Carson–Newman College (now Carson–Newman University), Catawba College, Elon College (now Elon University), Gardner–Webb College (now Gardner–Webb University), Lenoir–Rhyne College (now Lenoir–Rhyne University), Mars Hill College (now Mars Hill University), Newberry College and Presbyterian College, beginning the 1975 fall season (1975–76 academic year).
- 1989:
  - Newberry left the SAC-8 after the 1988 fall season (1988–89 academic year).
  - The SAC-8 added more sports to be a full-fledged multi-sport athletic conference, beginning the 1989–90 academic year.
  - Wingate College (now Wingate University) joined the SAC (while replacing Newberry) in the 1989–90 academic year.
- 1996 – Newberry returned to the SAC as an all-sports member in the 1996–97 academic year.
- 1997 – Elon left the SAC to join the Division I ranks of the National Collegiate Athletic Association (NCAA) as an NCAA D-I Independent (which would later join the Big South Conference as a provisional member, beginning the 1999–2000 school year) after the 1996–97 academic year.
- 1998 – Tusculum College (now Tusculum University) joined the SAC in the 1998–99 academic year.
- 2000 – Gardner–Webb left the SAC to join the NCAA Division I ranks as an NCAA D-I Independent (which would later join the Atlantic Sun Conference (ASUN) as a provisional member, beginning the 2002–03 school year) after the 1999–2000 academic year.
- 2006 – Lincoln Memorial University joined the SAC effective in the 2006–07 academic year.
- 2007:
  - Presbyterian left the SAC to join the NCAA Division I ranks and the Big South (as a provisional member) after the 2006–07 academic year.
  - Brevard College joined the SAC (as a provisional member) in the 2007–08 academic year.
- 2010 – Anderson University joined the SAC in the 2010–11 academic year.
- 2013 – Coker College (now Coker University) and Queens University joined the SAC in the 2013–14 academic year.
- 2017:
  - Brevard left the SAC to join the NCAA Division III ranks and the USA South Athletic Conference (USA South) after the 2016–17 academic year.
  - Limestone College (now Limestone University) joined the SAC as an affiliate member for football in the 2017 fall season (2017–18 academic year).
- 2018 – Effective with the 2018–19 academic year, the SAC and Conference Carolinas (CC) established a partnership known as "South Atlantic Conference Carolinas" (SACC) for field hockey and men's wrestling. Under the partnership, the SAC operated the joint field hockey championship, with CC filling the same role for men's wrestling. Accordingly, Belmont Abbey College and Converse College (now Converse University) joined the SAC as affiliate members for field hockey at that time. Limestone added that sport to its SAC affiliate membership.
- 2019:
  - The University of Virginia's College at Wise (UVA Wise) joined the SAC in the 2019–20 academic year.
  - The University of Mount Olive joined the SAC as an affiliate member for field hockey in the 2019 fall season (2019–20 academic year), while under the SACC partnership.
- 2020 – Limestone upgraded to become a full SAC member for all sports in the 2020–21 academic year.
- 2022:
  - Queens left the SAC to join the NCAA Division I ranks and the Atlantic Sun Conference (then known as the ASUN Conference) after the 2021–22 academic year.
  - Emory and Henry College (now Emory and Henry University) joined the SAC as a full member in the 2022–23 academic year.
  - Barton College and Erskine College joined the SAC as affiliates members for football in the 2022 fall season (2022–23 academic year).
  - Effective with the 2022–23 academic year, field hockey became no longer part of the SACC partnership, with that sport now being fully governed by the SAC. The existing CC field hockey schools continued to compete as SAC affiliates. At the same time, women's triathlon was placed under the SACC umbrella.
- 2023 – Effective with the 2023–24 academic year, the SACC men's wrestling league was dissolved. Originally the intent was for the SAC and CC to each begin their own wrestling league; however, all the SAC schools that sponsored wrestling instead became CC affiliates in that sport. At the same time, the SACC partnership added beach volleyball and women's wrestling.
- 2024 – Erskine left the SAC as an affiliate member for football, but joined as an affiliate member for beach volleyball, along with Emmanuel University, both effective in the 2024–25 academic year.
- 2025:
  - Limestone left the SAC at the end of the 2024–25 academic year; as the institution announced that it will cease operations.
  - Barton left the SAC as an affiliate member for football, but joined as an affiliate member for field hockey, all beginning in the 2025–26 academic year.

== Member schools ==
=== Charter members ===
Newberry College left the SAC in 1989 (as a football member) and rejoined in 1996 (as an all-sport member). Wingate replaced Newberry College as the final member for the birth of the all-sports SAC in 1989. Former members Elon, Gardner–Webb, and Presbyterian were charter members of both the SAC-8 football era and the SAC all-sports era.

SAC-8 football era (1975–1989)
Carson–Newman College
Catawba College
Elon College
Gardner–Webb College
Lenoir–Rhyne College
Mars Hill College
Newberry College
Presbyterian College

SAC all-sport era (1989–present)
Carson–Newman College
Catawba College
Elon College
Gardner–Webb College
Lenoir–Rhyne College
Mars Hill College
Presbyterian College
Wingate College

=== Current members ===
The SAC currently has 12 full members, with all but one being private schools.

| Institution | Location | Founded | Affiliation | Enrollment | Nickname | Joined (Note: Represents the calendar year when fall sports competition begins.) | Colors |
|---|---|---|---|---|---|---|---|
| Anderson University | Anderson, South Carolina | 1911 | Baptist | 4,519 | Trojans | 2010 | |
| Carson–Newman University | Jefferson City, Tennessee | 1851 | Baptist | 2,585 | Eagles | 1975 (Note: Charter member of the SAC-8 football league since the 1975–76 school year; also charter member of the SAC all-sports league since the 1989–90 school year.) | |
| Catawba College | Salisbury, North Carolina | 1851 | United Church of Christ | 1,241 | Indians | 1975 | |
| Coker University | Hartsville, South Carolina | 1908 | Nonsectarian | 1,263 | Cobras | 2013 | |
| Emory & Henry University | Emory, Virginia | 1836 | United Methodist | 1,292 | Wasps | 2022 | |
| Lenoir–Rhyne University | Hickory, North Carolina | 1891 | Lutheran ELCA | 2,255 | Bears | 1975 | |
| Lincoln Memorial University | Harrogate, Tennessee | 1897 | Nonsectarian | 6,081 | Railsplitters | 2006 | |
| Mars Hill University | Mars Hill, North Carolina | 1856 | Baptist | 1,049 | Lions | 1975 | |
| Newberry College | Newberry, South Carolina | 1856 | Lutheran ELCA | 1,521 | Wolves | 1975; 1996 (Note: Newberry competed in the SAC-8 as a football member from the 1975 to 1988 fall seasons (1975–76 to 1988–89 school years); but re-joined back to the SAC as an all-sports member, effective in the 1996–97 school year.) | |
| Tusculum University | Tusculum, Tennessee (Note: Mailing address is Greeneville.) | 1794 | Presbyterian | 1,105 | Pioneers | 1998 | |
| University of Virginia's College at Wise (UVA Wise) | Wise, Virginia | 1954 | Public | 2,253 | Cavaliers | 2019 | |
| Wingate University | Wingate, North Carolina | 1896 | Baptist | 3,424 | Bulldogs | 1989 | |

=== Affiliate members ===
The SAC currently has seven affiliate members, six private schools and one public school.

| Institution | Location | Founded | Affiliation | Enrollment | Nickname | Joined (Note: Represents the calendar year when fall sports competition begins.) | Colors | SAC sport | Primary conference |
|---|---|---|---|---|---|---|---|---|---|
| Barton College | Wilson, North Carolina | 1902 | Christian Church | 1,235 | Bulldogs | 2025 | | field hockey | Carolinas (CC) |
| Belmont Abbey College | Belmont, North Carolina | 1876 | Catholic | 1,687 | Crusaders | 2018 | | field hockey | Carolinas (CC) |
| Converse University (Note: Formerly known as Converse College until July 2021.) | Spartanburg, South Carolina | 1889 | Nonsectarian | 1,967 | Valkyries | 2018 | | field hockey | Carolinas (CC) |
| Emmanuel University | Franklin Springs, Georgia | 1919 | Pentecostal | 932 | Lions | 2024 | | beach volleyball | Carolinas (CC) |
| Erskine College (Note: Erskine competed in the SAC as an affiliate member for football from the 2022 to 2023 fall seasons (2022–23 to 2023–24 school years).) | Due West, South Carolina | 1839 | Reformed; Presbyterian | 1,132 | Flying Fleet | 2024 | | beach volleyball | Carolinas (CC) |
| Lander University | Greenwood, South Carolina | 1872 | Public | 4,423 | Bearcats | 2022 | | field hockey | Peach Belt (PBC) |
| University of Mount Olive | Mount Olive, North Carolina | 1951 | Free Will Baptist | 2,154 | Trojans | 2019 | | field hockey | Carolinas (CC) |

=== Former members ===
The SAC has six former full members, all private schools.

| Institution | Location | Founded | Affiliation | Enrollment | Nickname | Joined (Note: Represents the calendar year when fall sports competition begins.) | Left (Note: Represents the calendar year when spring sports competition ends.) | Current conference |
|---|---|---|---|---|---|---|---|---|
| Brevard College | Brevard, North Carolina | 1934 | United Methodist | 708 | Tornados | 2007 (Note: The Brevard men's and women's basketball teams joined the SAC a year after becoming a full member for other sports (2008–09).) | 2017 | USA South (Note: Currently an NCAA Division III athletic conference.) |
| Elon University | Elon, North Carolina | 1889 | Nonsectarian | 6,991 | Phoenix | 1975 (Note: Charter member of the SAC-8 football league since the 1975–76 school year; also charter member of the SAC all-sports league since the 1989–90 school year.) | 1997 | Coastal (CAA) (Note: Currently an NCAA Division I athletic conference.) (Note: Elon plays Division I FCS football in CAA Football, a separate entity administered by the all-sports CAA.) |
| Gardner–Webb University | Boiling Springs, North Carolina | 1905 | Baptist | 3,594 | Runnin' Bulldogs | 1975 | 2000 | Big South (BSC) (Note: Gardner–Webb plays FCS football in the Big South–OVC Football Association, an alliance between the Big South and the Ohio Valley Conference.) |
| Limestone University | Gaffney, South Carolina | 1845 | Christian | 1,786 | Saints | 2020 (Note: Limestone had been competing in the SAC as an affiliate member for football from the 2017 to 2019 fall seasons and for field hockey from the 2018 to 2019 fall seasons (with the final season of competition as an affiliate in both sports taking place during the 2019–20 school year).) | 2025 | Closed in 2025 |
| Presbyterian College | Clinton, South Carolina | 1880 | Presbyterian | 1,330 | Blue Hose | 1975 | 2007 | Big South (BSC) (Note: Presbyterian plays FCS football in the Pioneer Football League.) |
| Queens University of Charlotte | Charlotte, North Carolina | 1857 | Presbyterian | 2,100 | Royals | 2013 | 2022 | Atlantic Sun (ASUN) |

=== Former affiliate members ===
The SAC had had two former affiliate members, both private schools.

| Institution | Location | Founded | Affiliation | Enrollment | Nickname | Joined (Note: Represents the calendar year when fall sports competition begins.) | Left (Note: Represents the calendar year when spring sports competition ends.) | SAC sport | Primary conference |
|---|---|---|---|---|---|---|---|---|---|
| Barton College (Note: Barton remains in the SAC as an affiliate member for field hockey.) | Wilson, North Carolina | 1902 | Christian Church | 1,200 | Bulldogs | 2022 | 2025 | football | Carolinas (CC) |
| Erskine College (Note: Erskine remains in the SAC as an affiliate member for beach volleyball.) | Due West, South Carolina | 1839 | Presbyterian | 800 | Flying Fleet | 2022 | 2024 | football | Carolinas (CC) |

=== Membership timeline ===
Full member (all sports) Full member (non-football) Associate member (football) Associate member (sport)

== Sports ==
Conference sports
| Sport | Men's | Women's |
|---|---|---|
| Baseball | ✓ | |
| Basketball | ✓ | ✓ |
| Beach Volleyball | | ✓ |
| Cross Country | ✓ | ✓ |
| Field Hockey | | ✓ |
| Football | ✓ | |
| Golf | ✓ | ✓ |
| Lacrosse | ✓ | ✓ |
| Soccer | ✓ | ✓ |
| Softball | | ✓ |
| Tennis | ✓ | ✓ |
| Track & Field Indoor | ✓ | ✓ |
| Track & Field Outdoor | ✓ | ✓ |
| Volleyball | | ✓ |

=== Men's sponsored sports by school ===
| School | Baseball | Basketball | Cross Country | Football | Golf | Lacrosse | Soccer | Tennis | Track & Field Indoor | Track & Field Outdoor | Total SAC Sports |
|---|---|---|---|---|---|---|---|---|---|---|---|
| Anderson | ✓ | ✓ | ✓ | ✓ | ✓ | ✓ | ✓ | ✓ | ✓ | ✓ | 10 |
| Carson–Newman | ✓ | ✓ | ✓ | ✓ | ✓ | ✗ | ✓ | ✓ | ✓ | ✓ | 9 |
| Catawba | ✓ | ✓ | ✓ | ✓ | ✓ | ✓ | ✓ | ✓ | ✓ | ✓ | 10 |
| Coker | ✓ | ✓ | ✓ | ✗ | ✓ | ✓ | ✓ | ✓ | ✓ | ✓ | 9 |
| Emory & Henry | ✓ | ✓ | ✓ | ✓ | ✗ | ✓ | ✓ | ✓ | ✓ | ✓ | 9 |
| Lenoir–Rhyne | ✓ | ✓ | ✓ | ✓ | ✓ | ✓ | ✓ | ✓ | ✓ | ✓ | 10 |
| Lincoln Memorial | ✓ | ✓ | ✓ | ✗ | ✓ | ✓ | ✓ | ✓ | ✓ | ✓ | 9 |
| Mars Hill | ✓ | ✓ | ✓ | ✓ | ✓ | ✓ | ✓ | ✓ | ✓ | ✓ | 10 |
| Newberry | ✓ | ✓ | ✓ | ✓ | ✓ | ✓ | ✓ | ✓ | ✓ | ✓ | 10 |
| Tusculum | ✓ | ✓ | ✓ | ✓ | ✓ | ✓ | ✓ | ✓ | ✗ | ✓ | 9 |
| UVA Wise | ✓ | ✓ | ✓ | ✓ | ✓ | ✗ | ✗ | ✓ | ✗ | ✗ | 6 |
| Wingate | ✓ | ✓ | ✓ | ✓ | ✓ | ✓ | ✓ | ✓ | ✓ | ✓ | 10 |
| Totals | 12 | 12 | 12 | 10 | 11 | 10 | 11 | 12 | 10 | 11 | 111 |

=== Women's sponsored sports by school ===
| School | Basketball | Beach Volleyball (Note: De facto Division I sport. The NCAA championship is open to all NCAA members.) | Cross Country | Field Hockey | Golf | Lacrosse | Soccer | Softball | Tennis | Track & Field Indoor | Track & Field Outdoor | Volleyball | Total SAC Sports |
|---|---|---|---|---|---|---|---|---|---|---|---|---|---|
| Anderson | ✓ | ✗ | ✓ | ✗ | ✓ | ✓ | ✓ | ✓ | ✓ | ✓ | ✓ | ✓ | 10 |
| Carson–Newman | ✓ | ✓ | ✓ | ✗ | ✓ | ✗ | ✓ | ✓ | ✓ | ✓ | ✓ | ✓ | 10 |
| Catawba | ✓ | ✓ | ✓ | ✗ | ✓ | ✓ | ✓ | ✓ | ✓ | ✓ | ✓ | ✓ | 11 |
| Coker | ✓ | ✗ | ✓ | ✓ | ✓ | ✓ | ✓ | ✓ | ✓ | ✓ | ✓ | ✓ | 11 |
| Emory & Henry | ✓ | ✗ | ✓ | ✗ | ✗ | ✓ | ✓ | ✓ | ✓ | ✓ | ✓ | ✓ | 9 |
| Lenoir–Rhyne | ✓ | ✗ | ✓ | ✗ | ✓ | ✓ | ✓ | ✓ | ✓ | ✓ | ✓ | ✓ | 10 |
| Lincoln Memorial | ✓ | ✗ | ✓ | ✗ | ✓ | ✓ | ✓ | ✓ | ✓ | ✓ | ✓ | ✓ | 10 |
| Mars Hill | ✓ | ✗ | ✓ | ✗ | ✓ | ✓ | ✓ | ✓ | ✓ | ✓ | ✓ | ✓ | 10 |
| Newberry | ✓ | ✗ | ✓ | ✓ | ✓ | ✓ | ✓ | ✓ | ✓ | ✓ | ✓ | ✓ | 11 |
| Tusculum | ✓ | ✓ | ✓ | ✗ | ✓ | ✓ | ✓ | ✓ | ✓ | ✗ | ✓ | ✓ | 10 |
| UVA Wise | ✓ | ✗ | ✓ | ✗ | ✓ | ✓ | ✗ | ✓ | ✓ | ✗ | ✗ | ✓ | 7 |
| Wingate | ✓ | ✓ | ✓ | ✓ | ✓ | ✓ | ✓ | ✓ | ✓ | ✓ | ✓ | ✓ | 12 |
| Totals | 12 | 4+2 | 12 | 3+4 | 11 | 11 | 11 | 12 | 12 | 10 | 11 | 12 | 121+6 |
Affiliate Members
| Barton | | | | ✓ | | | | | | | | | 1 |
| Belmont Abbey | | | | ✓ | | | | | | | | | 1 |
| Converse | | | | ✓ | | | | | | | | | 1 |
| Emmanuel | | ✓ | | | | | | | | | | | 1 |
| Erskine | | ✓ | | | | | | | | | | | 1 |
| Lander | | | | ✓ | | | | | | | | | 1 |

=== Other sponsored sports by school ===
| School | Men | | | | Women | | | | | |
| School | Bowling (Note: Bowling is sponsored by the NCAA for women only. Men's college competition is sanctioned solely by the sport's US governing body, the United States Bowling Congress, which sanctions women's competition alongside the NCAA.) | Swimming &Diving | Volleyball (Note: De facto Division I sport. The NCAA operates a combined Division I/II national championship in men's volleyball.) | Wrestling | Acrobatics & Tumbling (Note: Acrobatics & tumbling, considered by the NCAA to be a single sport separate from the NCAA-sanctioned sport of gymnastics, graduated from the NCAA Emerging Sports for Women program in January 2026, with the first official NCAA championship to be held in 2026–27. It will be a de facto Division I sport, with a single championship open to all NCAA members.) | Bowling (Note: De facto Division I sport through 2026–27, with the NCAA championship open to all NCAA members. A separate Division II championship will be established in 2027–28.) | Equestrian (Note: Equestrianism is currently part of the NCAA Emerging Sports for Women program. It does not yet have an NCAA championship event; college competition is sponsored by the National Collegiate Equestrian Association, Intercollegiate Dressage Association (IDA), and Intercollegiate Horse Shows Association (IHSA).) | Flag football (Note: Part of the NCAA Emerging Sports for Women program.) | Swimming &Diving | Wrestling (Note: De facto Division I sport. Through 2026–27, the NCAA championship is open to all NCAA members. The sport's status with respect to Division II will not be affected by the establishment of a Division III championship in 2027–28.) |
|---|---|---|---|---|---|---|---|---|---|---|
| Carson–Newman | | CC | | | | | | | CC | |
| Catawba | | CC | IND | | | | | | CC | |
| Coker | | | | CC (Note: De facto Conference Carolinas affiliate as part of South Atlantic Conference Carolinas.) | CC | | | | | |
| Emory & Henry | | | | CC | | | IDA/IHSA | | | CC |
| Lenoir–Rhyne | | CC | | | | | | | CC | |
| Lincoln Memorial | | | IND | CC | | CC | | | | CC |
| Mars Hill | | CC | | | CC | | | CC | CC | |
| Newberry | | | IND | CC | | | | | | |
| Tusculum | IND | | IND | | | CC | | | | |
| Wingate | | CC | | | CC | | | CC | CC | |

In addition to the above:

- Anderson and Tusculum treat their male and female cheerleaders as varsity athletes.
- Carson–Newman treats their female cheerleaders (though not their male cheerleaders) and all-female dance teams as varsity athletes.
- Catawba treats its male and female cheerleaders and all-female dance team as varsity athletes. The school also sponsors a coeducational varsity eSports team.
- Coker has a coeducational varsity eSports team.
- Emory & Henry treats its cheerleaders and dancers as varsity athletes without regard to gender. The school's equestrian program is coeducational, and has chosen to not affiliate with the NCAA emerging sport status. Instead, E&H riders compete in the Intercollegiate Dressage Association (IDA) and Intercollegiate Horse Shows Association (IHSA).
- Lenoir–Rhyne treats its male and female cheerleaders and all-female dance team as varsity athletes.
- Mars Hill sponsors a varsity cycling team, with separate men's and women's squads.

== Conference facilities ==
| School | Football | | Basketball | |
| School | Stadium | Capacity | Arena | Capacity |
|---|---|---|---|---|
| Anderson Trojans | Spero Financial Field | 5,000 | Abney Athletic Center | 1,500 |
| Carson–Newman Eagles | Burke–Tarr Stadium | 5,500 | Holt Fieldhouse | 2,000 |
| Catawba Indians | Shuford Stadium | 4,500 | Goodman Gym | 3,500 |
| Coker Cobras | non-football school | | Harris E. & Louise H. DeLoach Center | 1,908 |
| Emory & Henry Wasps | Fred Selfe Stadium | 5,500 | John Rutledge King Center | 1,240 |
| Lenoir-Rhyne Bears | Moretz Stadium | 8,500 | Shuford Memorial Gymnasium | 2,770 |
| Lincoln Memorial Railsplitters | non-football school | | Tex Turner Arena | 5,000 |
| Mars Hill Lions | Meares Stadium | 5,000 | Stanford Arena | 2,800 |
| Newberry Wolves | Setzler Field | 4,000 | Eleazer Arena | 1,600 |
| Tusculum Pioneers | Pioneer Field | 1,850 | Pioneer Arena | 2,500 |
| UVA Wise Cavaliers | Carl Smith Stadium | 3,900 | David J. Prior Convocation Center | 3,000 |
| Wingate Bulldogs | Irwin Belk Stadium | 3,000 | Cuddy Arena | 2,300 |
