= Conference Carolinas =

American college athletic conference

- Formerly: North State Conference (1930–1961); Carolinas Intercollegiate Athletic Conference (1961–1995); Carolinas-Virginia Athletics Conference (1995–2007)
- Association: NCAA
- Founded: 1930; 96 years ago
- Commissioner: Chris Colvin
- Sports fielded: 28; men's: 13; women's: 15
- Division: Division II
- No. of teams: 16
- Headquarters: Greenville, South Carolina
- Region: Georgia, North Carolina, South Carolina, Tennessee, Virginia
- Website: conferencecarolinas.com

Locations

Conference Carolinas (formerly known as the Carolinas-Virginia Athletic Conference, Carolinas Conference, and North State Conference) is a college athletic conference affiliated with the National Collegiate Athletic Association (NCAA) primarily at the Division II level. It is also considered as one of the seven Division I conferences for men's volleyball. Originally formed in 1930, the league reached its modern incarnation in 1994. Member institutions are located in the southeastern United States in the states of Georgia, North Carolina, South Carolina, Tennessee, and Virginia. The Conference Carolinas membership currently consists of 16 small colleges or universities, 14 private and 2 public.

== History ==
Conference Carolinas
Location of Conference Carolinas members: full

Conference Carolinas dates to its inception on December 6, 1930. The conference was formed then as an athletic association "for the greater advantage of the small colleges in North Carolina". The official name given back then was the North State Intercollegiate Conference but known informally as the Old North State Conference. The birthplace was the Washington Duke Hotel in Durham, North Carolina, and the seven charter members were Appalachian, Atlantic Christian (now Barton College), Catawba, Guilford, Elon, High Point, and Lenoir–Rhyne.

The conference followed a policy of expansion for a period of time. Western Carolina became a member in 1933, East Carolina in 1947, Pfeiffer in 1960, Newberry in 1961, and Presbyterian in 1964, followed closely by Mars Hill.

With the acceptance of the first member from South Carolina in Newberry College, a name change became necessary. Thus on May 20, 1961 the official name of the conference was changed to the Carolinas Intercollegiate Athletic Conference (CIAC) but commonly known less formally as the Carolinas Conference.

East Carolina resigned in 1962 to join the Southern Conference and Appalachian and Western Carolina followed. Football sponsorship in the Carolinas Conference was dropped in 1975 when Lenoir–Rhyne, Newberry, Presbyterian, and Mars Hill joined the South Atlantic Conference.

Pembroke State University, now the University of North Carolina at Pembroke, became a first-time member in 1976 followed by Wingate College in 1979, and Lenoir–Rhyne rejoined in 1984.

While Guilford College withdrew in 1988, St. Andrews and Mount Olive were added that same year.

The 1989–90 academic year started a new era as Catawba, Elon, Lenoir–Rhyne and Wingate all withdrew to compete in the first year that the South Atlantic Conference provided championships in all sports, not just football.

The Carolinas Conference then added Belmont Abbey in 1989, Coker College (now Coker University) in 1991, and Lees-McRae in 1993. Pembroke State left in 1992.

The 1993–94 academic year brought a change to the conference national affiliation. The conference began the process of transferring membership to the National Collegiate Athletic Association (NCAA) after years as a National Association of Intercollegiate Athletics (NAIA) member. During the transition, it was a dual member of the NCAA's Division II and the NAIA's Division I.

The 1995–96 year brought dramatic change to the conference. First, full membership into NCAA Division II was acquired and NAIA affiliation dropped. Thus, this was the first official year of full competition and championship play for the conference in NCAA D-II status. Secondly, this was also the same year that Erskine, Longwood, and Queens were accepted as full members of the conference. With Longwood becoming the first Virginia member, another name change occurred and the Carolinas-Virginia Athletics Conference (known more universally as the 'CVAC') was born.

Following the 1997 academic year High Point resigned to join the NCAA D-I ranks, while in 1998 Limestone soon joined and were quickly followed by Anderson in 1999.

In 2003, Longwood University left the conference to explore possibilities in NCAA Division I. Then in 2005 the CVAC added Converse College (becoming Converse University in July 2021) as an affiliate member before becoming a full member starting in the 2007–08 season.

With the lone Virginia school in Longwood leaving, the league decided to go back to its roots and change its name to Conference Carolinas June 1, 2007.

On June 1, 2011, King College and North Greenville University became official members of the conference and opened the conference to its first Tennessee member in King.

In 2014–15, Emmanuel College (Georgia) and Southern Wesleyan University became official members of the conference (under provisional status) and opened the conference to its first Georgia member in Emmanuel. Southern Wesleyan began official full NCAA D-II membership in 2016–17 while Emmanuel started in 2018–19.

On November 17, 2015, CC announced that Chowan University gained affiliate membership for the following sports: women's golf, and men's & women's lacrosse; effective beginning the 2017 spring season within the 2016–17 academic year. Chowan would later add men's & women's soccer into its CC affiliate membership, beginning the 2017 fall season within the 2017–18 academic year.

After 57 years as a league member Pfeiffer University moved down to the NCAA D-III ranks on June 1, 2017.

Conference Carolinas and the South Atlantic Conference entered into a partnership in the 2018–19 school year by which the two leagues would operate as a single conference in field hockey and wrestling, with championships immediately conducted in both sports. The leagues agreed that CC would coordinate the wrestling championship, while the SAC would fill the same role for field hockey. Accordingly, all CC field hockey programs became de facto affiliates of the SAC, while SAC wrestling programs became de facto CC affiliates. The CC–SAC alliance is officially branded as "South Atlantic Conference Carolinas".

After the completion of the 2018–19 athletic year, former Commissioner Alan Patterson retired and was replaced by Chris Colvin. One of the first moves made by Colvin was to move the league headquarters to Greenville, South Carolina to be more centrally located to all member institutions.

The league now has 13 members, with the most recent changes taking place in 2021. Francis Marion University joined for the first time, and the University of North Carolina at Pembroke returned after an absence of nearly 30 years. They were the first public schools to join CC since Longwood's 2003 departure. The most recent departure from CC was that of Limestone College (later Limestone University, and now defunct), which moved to the SAC in 2020.

Many institutions have been members of the league during its rich history including Anderson, Appalachian, Barton (formerly Atlantic Christian), Belmont Abbey, Catawba, Coker, Converse, East Carolina, Erskine, Emmanuel, Francis Marion, Guilford, Elon, High Point, King, Lees-McRae, Lenoir–Rhyne, Limestone, Longwood, Mars Hill, Mount Olive, Newberry, North Greenville, Pfeiffer, Presbyterian, Queens, St. Andrews, UNC Pembroke (both as Pembroke State and under its current name), Western Carolina and Wingate.

Barton is the only remaining charter member followed in longevity by Mount Olive's joining in 1988.

=== Recent events ===
On May 5, 2020, CC added what it calls "Developmental Championships" for its members in the 2021–22 academic year. The conference claims to be the first in the NCAA to sponsor sub-varsity championships. According to CC, developmental teams consist of individuals who competed either sparingly or not at all at the varsity level in the season of the championship. The first such championships would be held in baseball, men's basketball, and men's & women's soccer.

For the 2020–21 school year, CC added acrobatics and tumbling, newly added to the NCAA Emerging Sports for Women program in that same school year, as its newest sport. Initially, five full members and one associate were to start competition, but two more associates were added before competition began.

The arrival of Francis Marion and return of UNC Pembroke were not the only changes to the conference membership in 2021. Converse admitted men to its residential undergraduate program for the first time, and also added men's sports. Converse initially planned to field seven teams, but did not field the initially announced men's volleyball team. Also in 2021–22, current SAC member Lincoln Memorial University added men's wrestling; Emory & Henry College, which sponsors that sport, started a transition from Division III to Division II, joining the SAC (although it did not start full SAC competition until 2022–23); and Mars Hill University became an associate member in acrobatics & tumbling. Emory & Henry and Lincoln Memorial became de facto CC affiliates as part of South Atlantic Conference Carolinas.

Also for the 2021–22 season, CC announced a partnership with the Great Midwest Athletic Conference (G-MAC) to conduct joint men's and women's bowling championship events (even though men's bowling is not considered a varsity sport by the NCAA). Each conference organizes its regular season independently, but the postseason is called Conference Carolinas/Great Midwest Athletic Conference Men's and Women's Bowling Championships. CC also announced Lincoln Memorial and Tusculum as new affiliate members for bowling.

In December 2021, CC and the SAC jointly announced that they would extend their existing partnership to include two women's sports, triathlon and wrestling, with triathlon competition starting in 2022–23 and wrestling in 2023–24. At the same time, both conferences agreed that after the 2021–22 school year, the SAC would become the only one of the two conferences to sponsor field hockey. The joint men's wrestling league continued to operate through the 2022–23 season. Initial plans were for both conferences to establish their own men's wrestling leagues, but this changed in 2023, when the two conferences agreed that only CC would sponsor men's wrestling from 2023–24. The CC and the SAC dissolved their men's wrestling partnership after the 2022–23 season, agreeing that only the CC would sponsor that sport from 2023–24. Accordingly, the five full SAC members that sponsor the sport (Coker, Emory & Henry, Limestone, Lincoln Memorial, and Newberry) would officially become CC affiliates. Three new associates joined for that sport—Allen University, Bluefield State University, and the University of Montevallo.

On June 24, 2022, CC added Wingate as an acrobatics and tumbling affiliate starting with that program's first season in 2023–24.

Developmental championships in women's basketball, men's volleyball, and men's wrestling were added for 2023–24. The women's basketball championship was delayed from its originally announced 2022–23 schedule.

On January 26, 2023, CC announced the addition of Shorter University as its 15th member for 2024–25 school year. The addition of Shorter gave CC its sixth football-sponsoring institution, and accordingly that same day, it was also announced that CC would begin sponsoring football in 2025. Sponsoring members would include Shorter and North Greenville, whose programs played in the Gulf South Conference, Barton and Erskine, affiliates of the South Atlantic Conference, UNC Pembroke, affiliate of the Mountain East Conference, and Chowan, up until 2022 was an affiliate of the Central Intercollegiate Athletics Association. It was also announced that Chowan would begin affiliation with the Gulf South Conference for the 2023 and 2024 seasons and that Shorter would compete as a D-II football independent for the 2024 season, with Erskine switching affiliations from the SAC to the GSC that season only to take their place, in order to accommodate programs until league play could begin. On April 5, 2024, Ferrum College was announced as the conference's 16th member, as well as its seventh football program for CC's inaugural football season. Therefore, CC would begin sponsoring football again after 50 years, with full members that sponsor that sport: Barton, Chowan, Erskine, Ferrum, North Greenville, Shorter and UNC Pembroke.

CC announced the addition of women's flag football on July 2, 2024, with the first season to take place in 2025–26. Six schools were announced as the league's inaugural members—Chowan, Emmanuel, incoming member Ferrum, King, Lees–McRae, and Mount Olive. Before the end of 2024, two more full CC members, Barton and Erskine, announced they would also add the sport in 2025–26. Then, on April 2, 2025, three affiliates were announced as joining CC flag football for its inaugural season—Mars Hill and Wingate, already CC affiliates in acrobatics & tumbling, plus Division I member Mount St. Mary's University.

CC would later announce on April 29, 2026 that it would begin sponsoring women's triathlon, currently part of the NCAA Emerging Sports for Women program, in 2026–27. It will be the first NCAA conference to officially sponsor the sport. Full members Barton, Emmanuel, and King will be joined by Newberry and Wingate, already CC affiliates in other sports, and new affiliates in Concord University and Lenoir–Rhyne University.

On May 6, 2026, CC announced that Shaw University would join the conference as a men's soccer affiliate, beginning in the 2027 fall season within the 2027–28 academic year.

=== Chronological timeline ===
- 1930 – Conference Carolinas was founded as the North State Intercollegiate Athletic Conference (NSIAC). Charter members included Appalachian State Teachers College (now Appalachian State University), Atlantic Christian College (now Barton College), Catawba College, Elon College (now Elon University), Guilford College, High Point College (now High Point University) and Lenoir–Rhyne College (now Lenoir–Rhyne University) beginning the 1930–31 academic year.
- 1933 – Western Carolina Teachers College (now Western Carolina University) joined the NSIAC in the 1933–34 academic year.
- 1947 – East Carolina Teachers College (now East Carolina University) joined the NSIAC in the 1947–48 academic year.
- 1961 – The NSIAC was rebranded as the Carolinas Intercollegiate Athletic Conference (CIAC) in the 1961–62 academic year.
- 1961 – Pfeiffer College (now Pfeiffer University) and Newberry College joined the CIAC in the 1961–62 academic year.
- 1962 – East Carolina left the CIAC to join the Division I ranks of the National Collegiate Athletic Association (NCAA) as an NCAA D-I Independent after the 1961–62 academic year.
- 1965 – Presbyterian College joined the CIAC in the 1965–66 academic year.
- 1968 – Appalachian State left the CIAC to join the NCAA Division I ranks as an NCAA D-I Independent after the 1967–68 academic year.
- 1969 – Western Carolina left the CIAC to join the NCAA Division I ranks as an NCAA D-I Independent after the 1968–69 academic year.
- 1972:
  - Newberry and Presbyterian left the CIAC to become NAIA Independents after the 1971–72 academic year.
  - Mars Hill College (now Mars Hill University) joined the CIAC in the 1972–73 academic year.
- 1975 – Lenoir–Rhyne left the CIAC to become an NAIA Independent after the 1974–75 academic year.
- 1976:
  - Mars Hill left the CIAC to become an NAIA Independent after the 1975–76 academic year.
  - Pembroke State University (now the University of North Carolina at Pembroke) joined the CIAC in the 1976–77 academic year.
- 1979 – Wingate College (now Wingate University) joined the CIAC in the 1979–80 academic year.
- 1984 – Lenoir–Rhyne rejoined the CIAC in the 1984–85 academic year.
- 1988:
  - Guilford left the CIAC to join the NCAA Division III ranks and the Old Dominion Athletic Conference (ODAC) after the 1987–88 academic year.
  - Mount Olive College (now the University of Mount Olive) and St. Andrews Presbyterian College (now St. Andrews University) joined the CIAC in the 1988–89 academic year.
- 1989:
  - Catawba, Elon, Lenoir–Rhyne and Wingate left the CIAC to form part of the South Atlantic Conference (SAC) after the 1988–89 academic year.
  - Belmont Abbey College joined the CIAC in the 1989–90 academic year.
- 1991 – Coker College (now Coker University) joined the CIAC in the 1991–92 academic year.
- 1992 – Pembroke State (now UNC Pembroke) left the CIAC to join the Peach Belt Conference (PBC) after the 1991–92 academic year.
- 1993:
  - The CIAC was granted affiliate membership status within the National Collegiate Athletic Association (NCAA), while still having membership within the National Association of Intercollegiate Athletics (NAIA), beginning the 1993–94 academic year.
    - – Lees–McRae College joined the CIAC in the 1993–94 academic year.
- 1995:
  - The CIAC had achieved full membership status within the NCAA Division II ranks, hence leaving the NAIA in the process, beginning the 1995–96 academic year.
  - The CIAC was rebranded as the Carolinas–Virginia Athletic Conference (CVAC), beginning the 1995–96 academic year; due to having a full core member representing in the state of Virginia at that timne.
  - Erskine College, Longwood College (now Longwood University) and Queens College of Charlotte (now Queens University of Charlotte) joined the CVAC in the 1995–96 academic year.
- 1997 – High Point left the CVAC to join the NCAA Division II ranks as an NCAA D-II Independent (who would later join the NCAA Division I ranks and the Big South Conference beginning the 1999–2000 school year) after the 1996–97 academic year.
- 1998 – Limestone College (later Limestone University) and Anderson College of South Carolina (now Anderson University of South Carolina) joined the CVAC in the 1998–99 academic year.
- 2003 – Longwood left the CVAC to join the NCAA Division II ranks as an NCAA D-II Independent after the 2002–03 academic year.
- 2005 – Converse College (now Converse University) joined the CVAC as an affiliate member for women’s cross country, soccer, tennis and volleyball in the 2005–06 academic year.
- 2007:
  - The CVAC was rebranded as the Conference Carolinas (CC) in the 2007–08 academic year.
  - Converse had upgraded to join the CVAC (now CC) for all sports as a provisional member in the 2007–08 academic year.
- 2008 – Converse began full member competition within the NCAA Division II ranks and CC in the 2008–09 academic year.
- 2010 – Anderson (S.C.) left CC to join the SAC after the 2009–10 academic year.
- 2011 – King College of Tennessee (now King University) and North Greenville University joined the CC in the 2011–12 academic year.
- 2012 – St. Andrews left CC to join the Appalachian Athletic Conference (AAC) of the National Association of Intercollegiate Athletics (NAIA) after the 2011–12 academic year.
- 2013 – Coker and Queens (N.C.) left CC to join the SAC after the 2012–13 academic year.
- 2014 – Emmanuel College (now Emmanuel University) and Southern Wesleyan University joined CC as provisional members in the 2014–15 academic year.
- 2016:
  - Southern Wesleyan began full member competition within the NCAA Division II ranks and CC in the 2016–17 academic year.
  - Chowan University joined CC as an affiliate member for women's golf, and men's & women's lacrosse in the 2017 spring season (2016–17 academic year).
- 2017:
  - Pfeiffer left CC to join the NCAA Division III ranks and the USA South Athletic Conference (USA South) after the 2016–17 academic year.
  - Chowan added men's & women's soccer into its CC affiliate membership in the 2017 fall season (2017–18 academic year).
- 2018:
  - Emmanuel (Ga.) began full member competition within the NCAA Division II ranks and CC in the 2018–19 academic year.
  - Coker, Newberry and Queens (N.C.) rejoined CC as affiliate members for field hockey and men's wrestling in the 2018–19 academic year.
- 2019:
  - Chowan had upgraded to join CC for all sports in the 2019–20 academic year.
  - Salem University joined CC as an affiliate member for men's and women's swimming & diving in the 2019–20 academic year.
- 2020:
  - Limestone left CC to join the SAC after the 2019–20 academic year; while it would remain in the conference as an affiliate member for acrobatics and tumbling, field hockey and men's wrestling, beginning the 2020–21 school year.
  - Two other institutions joined CC as affiliate members (and/or added other single sports into their affiliate memberships), all effective in the 2020–21 academic year:
    - Lander University (alongside Coker) for acrobatics and tumbling
- 2021:
  - Francis Marion University joined and UNC Pembroke (formerly Pembroke State) rejoined CC in the 2021–22 academic year.
  - Converse added men's sports into its athletic program, also effective with the 2021–22 academic year.
  - Four institutions joined CC as affiliate members, all effective in the 2021–22 academic year:
    - Emory & Henry College (now Emory and Henry University) for men's wrestling, although it would later begin competition in the following school year;
    - Lincoln Memorial University for men's wrestling and men's & women's bowling;
    - Mars Hill rejoined for acrobatics and tumbling;
    - and Tusculum University for men's & women's bowling.
- 2022:
  - Three institutions left CC as affiliate members (and/or removed other single sports from their affiliate memberships), all effective after the 2021–22 academic year:
    - Limestone for field hockey
    - Lincoln Memorial for men's bowling
    - and Queens started a transition to Division I as a new member of the Atlantic Sun Conference (ASUN), thus departing from its affiliate memberships in field hockey and men's wrestling.
- 2023:
  - Two institutions left CC as affiliate members (and/or removed other single sports from their affiliate memberships), all effective after the 2022–23 academic year:
    - Salem for men's and women's swimming & diving
    - and Tusculum for men's and women's bowling
  - Young Harris College joined CC in the 2023–24 academic year.
  - Four institutions joined CC as affiliate members (and/or added other single sports into their affiliate memberships), all effective in the 2023–24 academic year:
    - Wingate for acrobatics and tumbling
    - Allen University, Bluefield State University and the University of Montevallo for men's wrestling
- 2024:
  - Lincoln Memorial left CC as an affiliate member for women's bowling after the 2023–24 academic year.
  - Shorter University joined CC in the 2024–25 academic year.
  - Six institutions joined CC as affiliate members (and/or added other single sports into their affiliate memberships), all effective in the 2024–25 academic year:
    - Montevallo for men's and women's swimming & diving
    - Allen, Bluefield State, Emory and Henry, Lincoln Memorial and Newberry for women's wrestling (while in collaboration with the SAC)
- 2025:
  - Limestone left CC as an affiliate member for acrobatics & tumbling and men's wrestling at the end of the 2024–25 academic year, as the institution announced that it would cease operations.
  - Ferrum College joined CC in the 2025–26 academic year.
  - Mount St. Mary's University joined CC as an affiliate member for women's flag football (with Mars Hill and Wingate adding that sport to their affiliate memberships) in the 2026–27 academic year.
- 2026
  - Montevallo left CC as an affiliate member for men's and women's swimming & diving at the end of the 2025–26 academic year, as the institution announced that it would drop those programs.
  - Carson–Newman University, Catawba College, and Lenoir–Rhyne University joined CC as affiliate members for men's and women's swimming & diving (with Mars Hill and Wingate adding those sports to their affiliate memberships) in the 2026–27 academic year.
  - Concord University joined CC as an affiliate member for women's triathlon (with Lenoir–Rhyne, Newberry, and Wingate adding that sport to their affiliate memberships) in the 2026–27 academic year.
- 2027 – Shaw University will join CC as an affiliate member for men's soccer, beginning in the 2027 fall season (2027–28 academic year).

== Member schools ==
=== Current members ===
The CC currently has 16 full members; all but two are private schools. Reclassifying members listed in yellow.

Institution	Location	Founded	Affiliation	Enrollment (Fall 2022)	Nickname	Joined (Note: Represents the calendar year when fall sports competition begins.)	Colors
Barton College	Wilson, North Carolina	1902	Disciples of Christ	1,235	Bulldogs	1930	Royal blue and black
Belmont Abbey College	Belmont, North Carolina	1876	Catholic (O.S.B.)	1,687	Crusaders	1989	Crimson and white
Chowan University	Murfreesboro, North Carolina	1848	Baptist	708	Hawks	2019 (Note: Chowan competed in the CC as an affiliate member for women's golf, and men's & women's lacrosse in the 2017 spring season (2016–17 school year). Later it added men's & women's soccer to its CC affiliate membership in the 2017 fall season (2017–18 school year). Their final season as an affiliate within the CC occurred during the 2018–19 school year.)	Royal blue and white
Converse University	Spartanburg, South Carolina	1889	Nonsectarian	1,967	Valkyries	2007 (Note: Converse, traditionally a women's college, did not field men's sports until 2021–22, when it opened its residential undergraduate program to men for the first time. Converse is initially fielding six men's teams.) (Note: Converse competed in the CC as an affiliate member for its women's sports (cross country, soccer, tennis and volleyball) from 2005–06 to 2006–07; before upgrading to join as a women's sports-based provisional member in the 2007–08 school year; before the school later began full NCAA D-II and CC competition for all sponsored sports in 2008–09.)	Purple and gold
Emmanuel University	Franklin Springs, Georgia	1919	Pentecostal	932	Lions	2014 (Note: Emmanuel (Ga.) joined the CC as a provisional member in the 2014–15 school year; before the school later began full NCAA D-II and CC competition for all sponsored sports in 2018–19.)	Gold and cardinal
Erskine College	Due West, South Carolina	1839	Reformed; Presbyterian	1,132	Flying Fleet	1995	Garnet and gold
Ferrum College	Ferrum, Virginia	1913	United Methodist	780	Panthers	2025	Black and gold
Francis Marion University	Florence, South Carolina	1970	Public	4,261	Patriots	2021	Red, white, and blue
King University	Bristol, Tennessee	1867	Evangelical; Presbyterian	1,295	Tornado	2011	Scarlet and navy
Lees–McRae College	Banner Elk, North Carolina	1899	Presbyterian	917	Bobcats	1993	Forest green and gold
University of Mount Olive	Mount Olive, North Carolina	1951	Original Free Will; Baptist	2,154	Trojans	1988	Green and yellow
North Greenville University	Tigerville, South Carolina	1891	Baptist	2,304	Trailblazers	2011	Black and red
Shorter University	Rome, Georgia	1873	Baptist	1,447	Hawks	2024	Royal blue and white
Southern Wesleyan University	Central, South Carolina	1908	Wesleyan	980	Warriors	2014 (Note: Southern Wesleyan joined the CC as a provisional member in the 2014–15 school year; before the school later began full NCAA D-II and CC competition for all sponsored sports in 2016–17.)	Blue
University of North Carolina at Pembroke	Pembroke, North Carolina	1887	Public (Note: Part of the University of North Carolina System.)	7,674	Braves	1976; 2021 (Note: UNC Pembroke had been a full conference member of the CC (then known as the CIAC) from 1976–77 to 1991–92 under its previous name of Pembroke State University.)	Black and gold
Young Harris College	Young Harris, Georgia	1886	United Methodist	1,922	Mountain Lions	2023	Purple and white

=== Affiliate members ===
CC currently has 15 affiliate members, with all but three being private schools, and two being historically African-American institutions.

Institution	Location	Founded	Affiliation	Enrollment	Nickname	Joined (Note: Represents the calendar year when fall sports competition begins.)	Colors	CC sport(s)	Primary conference
Allen University	Columbia, South Carolina	1870	Nonsectarian (Note: Also a historically black college or university (HBCU).)	657	Yellow Jackets	2023		Men's wrestling	Southern (SIAC)
Allen University	Columbia, South Carolina	1870	Nonsectarian	657	Yellow Jackets	2024		Women's wrestling	Southern (SIAC)
Bluefield State University	Bluefield, West Virginia	1895	Public	1,313	Big Blue	2023		Men's wrestling	Central (CIAA)
Bluefield State University	Bluefield, West Virginia	1895	Public	1,313	Big Blue	2024		Women's wrestling	Central (CIAA)
Carson–Newman University	Jefferson City, Tennessee	1851	Baptist	2,585	Eagles	2026		Men's swimming & diving	South Atlantic (SAC)
Carson–Newman University	Jefferson City, Tennessee	1851	Baptist	2,585	Eagles	2026		Women's swimming & diving	South Atlantic (SAC)
Catawba College	Salisbury, North Carolina	1851	United Church of Christ	1,241	Indians	2026		Men's swimming & diving	South Atlantic (SAC)
Catawba College	Salisbury, North Carolina	1851	United Church of Christ	1,241	Indians	2026		Women's swimming & diving	South Atlantic (SAC)
Coker University (Note: Coker was a full member of CC from 1991–92 to 2012–13.)	Hartsville, South Carolina	1908	Nonsectarian	1,263	Cobras	2018		Men's wrestling	South Atlantic (SAC)
Coker University	Hartsville, South Carolina	1908	Nonsectarian	1,263	Cobras	2020		Acrobatics and tumbling	South Atlantic (SAC)
Concord University	Athens, West Virginia	1872	Public	1,943	Mountain Lions	2026		Women's triathlon	Mountain East (MEC)
Emory & Henry University	Emory, Virginia	1836	Methodist	1,292	Wasps	2022 (Note: Emory & Henry started Division II transition in 2021, but started South Atlantic Conference (SAC) competition in 2022.)		Men's wrestling	South Atlantic (SAC)
Emory & Henry University	Emory, Virginia	1836	Methodist	1,292	Wasps	2024		Women's wrestling	South Atlantic (SAC)
Lander University	Greenwood, South Carolina	1872	Public	4,423	Bearcats	2020		Acrobatics and tumbling	Peach Belt (PBC)
Lenoir–Rhyne University	Hickory, North Carolina	1891	Lutheran ELCA	2,255	Bears	2026		Men's swimming & diving	South Atlantic (SAC)
Lenoir–Rhyne University	Hickory, North Carolina	1891	Lutheran ELCA	2,255	Bears	2026		Women's swimming & diving	South Atlantic (SAC)
Lenoir–Rhyne University	Hickory, North Carolina	1891	Lutheran ELCA	2,255	Bears	2026		Women's triathlon	South Atlantic (SAC)
Lincoln Memorial University	Harrogate, Tennessee	1897	Nonsectarian	6,081	Railsplitters	2021		Men's wrestling	South Atlantic (SAC)
Lincoln Memorial University	Harrogate, Tennessee	1897	Nonsectarian	6,081	Railsplitters	2024		Women's wrestling	South Atlantic (SAC)
Mars Hill University (Note: Mars Hill was a full member of CC from 1972–73 to 1975–76.)	Mars Hill, North Carolina	1856	Baptist	1,049	Lions	2021		Acrobatics and tumbling	South Atlantic (SAC)
Mars Hill University	Mars Hill, North Carolina	1856	Baptist	1,049	Lions	2025		Women's flag football	South Atlantic (SAC)
Mars Hill University	Mars Hill, North Carolina	1856	Baptist	1,049	Lions	2026		Men's swimming & diving	South Atlantic (SAC)
Mars Hill University	Mars Hill, North Carolina	1856	Baptist	1,049	Lions	2026		Women's swimming & diving	South Atlantic (SAC)
University of Montevallo	Montevallo, Alabama	1896	Public	3,142	Falcons	2023		Men's wrestling	Gulf South (GSC)
University of Montevallo	Montevallo, Alabama	1896	Public	3,142	Falcons	2025		Acrobatics & tumbling	Gulf South (GSC)
Mount St. Mary's University	Emmitsburg, Maryland (Note: The Mount St. Mary's campus has an Emmitsburg mailing address but is in unincorporated Frederick County.)	1808	Catholic (Archdiocese of Baltimore)	1,869	Mountaineers	2025		Women's flag football	Metro Atlantic (MAAC) (Note: Currently an NCAA Division I athletic conference.)
Newberry College (Note: Newberry was a full member of CC from 1961–62 to 1971–72.)	Newberry, South Carolina	1856	Lutheran ELCA	1,521	Wolves	2018		Men's wrestling	South Atlantic (SAC)
Newberry College	Newberry, South Carolina	1856	Lutheran ELCA	1,521	Wolves	2024		Women's wrestling	South Atlantic (SAC)
Newberry College	Newberry, South Carolina	1856	Lutheran ELCA	1,521	Wolves	2026		Women's triathlon	South Atlantic (SAC)
Wingate University (Note: Wingate was a full member of CC from 1979–80 to 1988–89.)	Wingate, North Carolina	1896	Baptist	3,424	Bulldogs	2023		Acrobatics and tumbling	South Atlantic (SAC)
Wingate University	Wingate, North Carolina	1896	Baptist	3,424	Bulldogs	2025		Women's flag football	South Atlantic (SAC)
Wingate University	Wingate, North Carolina	1896	Baptist	3,424	Bulldogs	2026		Men's swimming & diving	South Atlantic (SAC)
Wingate University	Wingate, North Carolina	1896	Baptist	3,424	Bulldogs	2026		Women's swimming & diving	South Atlantic (SAC)
Wingate University	Wingate, North Carolina	1896	Baptist	3,424	Bulldogs	2026		Women's triathlon	South Atlantic (SAC)

==== Future affiliate members ====
Institution	Location	Founded	Affiliation	Enrollment	Nickname	Joining (Note: Represents the calendar year when fall sports competition begins.)	Colors	CC sport(s)	Primary conference	Current conference in CC sport(s)
Shaw University	Raleigh, North Carolina	1896	Baptist (Note: Also a historically black college or university (HBCU).)	962	Bears	2027		Men's soccer	Central (CIAA)	Independent

=== Former members ===
A total of 19 schools are former CC members, with 15 of them being private schools. School names and nicknames reflect those in use during the final year each institution was a member.

Institution	Location	Founded	Affiliation	Enrollment	Nickname	Joined (Note: Represents the calendar year when fall sports competition begins.)	Left (Note: Represents the calendar year when spring sports competition ends.)	Current conference
Anderson University	Anderson, South Carolina	1911	Baptist	4,008	Trojans	1998	2010	South Atlantic (SAC)
Appalachian State University	Boone, North Carolina	1899	Public (UNC) (Note: Appalachian State, East Carolina, and Western Carolina did not become part of the University of North Carolina system until 1972, after all had left the conference.)	20,641	Mountaineers	1930	1968	Sun Belt (Note: Currently an NCAA Division I athletic conference.)
Catawba College	Salisbury, North Carolina	1851	United Church of Christ	1,207	Indians	1930	1989	South Atlantic (SAC)
Coker College (Note: Currently known as Coker University since 2019.)	Hartsville, South Carolina	1908	Nonsectarian	1,087	Cobras	1991	2013	South Atlantic (SAC)
East Carolina College (Note: Currently known as East Carolina University since 1967.)	Greenville, North Carolina	1907	Public (UNC)	28,021	Pirates	1947	1962	American
Elon College (Note: Currently known as Elon University since 2001. The "Elon College" name is now applied to the university's college of arts and sciences.)	Elon, North Carolina	1889	Nonsectarian	7,127	Phoenix	1930	1989	Coastal (CAA)
Guilford College	Greensboro, North Carolina	1837	Quakers	1,198	Quakers	1930	1988	Old Dominion (ODAC) (Note: Currently an NCAA Division III athletic conference.)
High Point University	High Point, North Carolina	1924	United Methodist	5,860	Panthers	1930	1997	Big South (BSC)
Lenoir–Rhyne College (Note: Currently known as Lenoir–Rhyne University since 2008.) (Note: Lenoir–Rhyne previously withdrew from the CC from 1975–76 to 1983–84.)	Hickory, North Carolina	1891	Lutheran ELCA	2,312	Bears	1930; 1984	1975; 1989	South Atlantic (SAC)
Limestone College (Note: Currently known as Limestone University since 2020.)	Gaffney, South Carolina	1845	Christian	1,840	Saints	1998	2020	N/A (Note: Limestone closed at the end of the 2024–25 academic year.)
Longwood University	Farmville, Virginia	1839	Public	4,612	Lancers	1995	2003	Big South (BSC)
Mars Hill College (Note: Currently known as Mars Hill University since 2013.)	Mars Hill, North Carolina	1856	Baptist	1,072	Lions	1972	1976	South Atlantic (SAC)
Newberry College	Newberry, South Carolina	1856	Lutheran ELCA	1,242	Wolves	1961	1972	South Atlantic (SAC)
Pfeiffer University	Misenheimer, North Carolina	1885	United Methodist	1,185	Falcons	1960 (Note: Pfeiffer began athletic competition in the CIAC in the 1961–62 academic year.)	2017	USA South
Presbyterian College	Clinton, South Carolina	1880	Presbyterian (PCUSA)	1,231	Blue Hose	1964 (Note: Presbyterian began athletic competition in the CIAC in the 1965–66 academic year.)	1972	Big South (BSC)
Queens University of Charlotte	Charlotte, North Carolina	1857	Presbyterian (PCUSA)	2,063	Royals	1995	2013	Atlantic Sun (ASUN)
St. Andrews University	Laurinburg, North Carolina	1958	Presbyterian	887	Knights	1988	2012	N/A (Note: St. Andrews closed at the end of the 2024–25 academic year.)
Western Carolina University	Cullowhee, North Carolina	1889	Public (UNC)	11,877	Catamounts	1932	1969	Southern (SoCon)
Wingate College (Note: Currently known as Wingate University since 1995.)	Wingate, North Carolina	1896	Baptist	3,440	Bulldogs	1979	1989	South Atlantic (SAC)

=== Former affiliate members ===
The CC had six former affiliate members; all were private schools:

Institution	Location	Founded	Affiliation	Enrollment	Nickname	Joined (Note: Represents the calendar year when fall sports competition begins.)	Left (Note: Represents the calendar year when spring sports competition ends.)	CC sport(s)	Primary conference
Limestone University (Note: Limestone was a full member of CC from 1998–99 to 2019–20.)	Gaffney, South Carolina	1845	Christian	1,840	Saints	2020	2022	Field hockey	N/A (Note: Limestone closed at the end of the 2024–25 academic year.)
Lincoln Memorial University	Harrogate, Tennessee	1897	Nonsectarian	5,118	Railsplitters	2021	2022	Men's bowling	South Atlantic (SAC)
Lincoln Memorial University	Harrogate, Tennessee	1897	Nonsectarian	5,118	Railsplitters	2021	2024	Women's bowling	South Atlantic (SAC)
University of Montevallo	Montevallo, Alabama	1896	Public	3,142	Falcons	2024	2026	Men's swimming & diving	Gulf South (GSC)
University of Montevallo	Montevallo, Alabama	1896	Public	3,142	Falcons	2024	2026	Women's swimming & diving	Gulf South (GSC)
Queens University of Charlotte (Note: Queens (N.C.) was a full member of the CC from 1995–96 to 2012–13.)	Charlotte, North Carolina	1857	Presbyterian (PCUSA)	2,063	Royals	2018	2022	Field hockey	Atlantic Sun (ASUN) (Note: Currently an NCAA Division I athletic conference.)
Queens University of Charlotte	Charlotte, North Carolina	1857	Presbyterian (PCUSA)	2,063	Royals	2018	2022	Men's wrestling	Atlantic Sun (ASUN)
Salem University	Salem, West Virginia	1888	Private for-profit	870	Tigers	2019	2023	Men's swimming & diving	Independent
Salem University	Salem, West Virginia	1888	Private for-profit	870	Tigers	2019	2023	Women's swimming & diving	Independent
Tusculum University	Tusculum, Tennessee	1794	Presbyterian	1,494	Pioneers	2021	2023	Men's bowling	South Atlantic (SAC)
Tusculum University	Tusculum, Tennessee	1794	Presbyterian	1,494	Pioneers	2021	2023	Women's bowling	South Atlantic (SAC)

=== Membership timeline ===
Full member (all sports) Full member (non-football) Associate member (football) Associate member (sport)

== Sports ==
When Barton became the sixth member to sponsor men's volleyball in 2011–12, Conference Carolinas became the fourth official scholarship-granting conference in NCAA men's volleyball. It also became the first all-sports conference (i.e., one that sponsors men's and women's basketball) ever to sponsor men's volleyball as a scholarship sport, and is also the first men's volleyball conference to consist solely of Division II members. No D-I all-sports conference sponsored the sport until the Big West Conference launched a men's volleyball league in the 2018 season (2017–18 school year). CC is also the first NCAA conference to officially sponsor women's triathlon, adding the sport for 2026–27.

Conference Carolinas sponsors intercollegiate athletic competition in the following sports:

A divisional format is used for men's & women's soccer, men's & women's basketball, softball and women's volleyball.
East
- Barton
- Chowan
- Francis Marion
- Mount Olive
- UNC–Pembroke
Northwest
- Belmont Abbey
- Converse
- King (Tenn.)
- Lees–McRae
- North Greenville
Southwest
- Emmanuel (Ga.)
- Erskine
- Shorter
- Southern Wesleyan
- Young Harris

Conference sports
Sport	Men's	Women's
Acrobatics & tumbling		✓
Baseball	✓	
Basketball	✓	✓
Bowling		✓
Cross country	✓	✓
Flag football		✓
Football	✓	
Golf	✓	✓
Lacrosse	✓	✓
Soccer	✓	✓
Softball		✓
Swimming & Diving	✓	✓
Tennis	✓	✓
Track & field indoor	✓	✓
Track & field outdoor	✓	✓
Triathlon		✓
Volleyball	✓	✓
Wrestling	✓	✓

In men's wrestling and women's triathlon, Conference Carolinas and the South Atlantic Conference have operated as a single league known as South Atlantic Conference Carolinas (SACC), holding joint conference tournaments in each sport. SACC will start sponsoring women's wrestling in 2023–24. SACC also operated in field hockey until the two conferences agreed that only the SAC would sponsor that sport starting in 2022–23. As noted previously, the men's wrestling championship was operated by CC through 2022–23; initially, the SAC was to establish its own men's wrestling league, but the two conferences later agreed that only CC would sponsor that sport from 2023–24. CC would later officially add women's triathlon for 2026–27.

In bowling, Conferences Carolinas and the Great Midwest Athletic Conference made a partnership to make a men's and women's bowling championship (even though men's bowling is not considered a varsity sport by the NCAA). Each conference will organize its regular season independently but the postseason will be called Conference Carolinas/Great Midwest Athletic Conference Men's and Women's Bowling Championships.

=== Men's sponsored sports by school ===
School	Baseball	Basketball	Cross Country	Football	Golf	Lacrosse	Soccer	Swimming & Diving	Tennis	Track & Field Indoor	Track & Field Outdoor	Volleyball (Note: De facto Division I sport. The NCAA operates a combined Division I/II championship in men's volleyball, and scholarship limits in that sport are the same for members of both divisions.)	Wrestling	Total CC Sports
Barton	✓	✓	✓	✓	✓	✓	✓	✓	✓	✓	✓	✓	✗	12
Belmont Abbey	✓	✓	✓	✗	✓	✓	✓	✗	✓	✓	✓	✓	✓	11
Chowan	✓	✓	✓	✓	✓	✓	✓	✓	✓	✗	✗	✗	✗	9
Converse	✗	✓	✓	✗	✗	✗	✓	✗	✓	✓	✓	✗	✗	6
Emmanuel	✓	✓	✓	✗	✓	✓	✓	✓	✓	✓	✓	✓	✓	12
Erskine	✓	✓	✓	✓	✓	✗	✓	✗	✗	✓	✓	✓	✗	9
Ferrum	✓	✓	✓	✓	✓	✓	✓	✗	✓	✓	✓	✗	✓	11
Francis Marion	✓	✓	✓	✗	✗	✗	✓	✓	✓	✓	✗	✗	✗	7
King	✓	✓	✓	✗	✓	✗	✓	✓	✓	✓	✓	✓	✓	11
Lees–McRae	✗	✓	✓	✗	✗	✓	✓	✓	✓	✓	✓	✓	✗	9
Mount Olive	✓	✓	✓	✗	✓	✓	✓	✗	✓	✓	✓	✓	✓	11
North Greenville	✓	✓	✓	✓	✓	✓	✓	✗	✓	✓	✓	✓	✗	11
Shorter	✓	✓	✓	✓	✓	✓	✓	✗	✓	✓	✓	✗	✗	10
Southern Wesleyan	✓	✓	✓	✗	✓	✗	✓	✗	✗	✓	✓	✗	✗	7
UNC Pembroke	✓	✓	✓	✓	✗	✗	✗	✗	✗	✓	✓	✗	✓	7
Young Harris	✓	✓	✓	✗	✓	✓	✓	✗	✓	✗	✗	✗	✗	7
Totals	14	16	16	7	12	10	15	6+5 (Note: Affiliate members Carson–Newman, Catawba, Lenoir–Rhyne, Mars Hill, and Wingate.)	13	14	13	8	6+7 (Note: Affiliate members Allen, Bluefield State, Coker, Emory & Henry, Lincoln Memorial, Montevallo, and Newberry.)	150+12

=== Women's sponsored sports by school ===
School	Acrobatics & Tumbling (Note: Graduated from the NCAA Emerging Sports for Women program in January 2026, with the first official NCAA championship taking place in 2026–27. It will become a de facto Division I sport at that time, with the championship open to members of all three divisions.)	Basketball	Bowling (Note: De facto Division I sport through 2026–27. The NCAA bowling championship is currently open to members of all three divisions, but a separate Division II championship will be established in 2027–28.)	Cross Country	Flag football (Note: Currently part of the NCAA Emerging Sports for Women program.)	Golf	Lacrosse	Soccer	Softball	Swimming & Diving	Tennis	Triathlon	Track & Field Indoor	Track & Field Outdoor	Volleyball	Wrestling (Note: De facto Division I sport. The NCAA women's wrestling championship is currently open to members of all three divisions. The sport's status with regard to D-II members will not be affected by the establishment of a separate Division III championship in 2027–28.)	Total CC Sports
Barton	✗	✓	✗	✓	✓	✓	✓	✓	✓	✓	✓	✓	✓	✓	✓	✗	13
Belmont Abbey	✓	✓	✓	✓	✗	✓	✓	✓	✓	✗	✓	✗	✓	✓	✓	✗	12
Chowan	✓	✓	✓	✓	✓	✓	✓	✓	✓	✓	✓	✗	✗	✗	✓	✗	12
Converse	✓	✓	✗	✓	✗	✓	✓	✓	✓	✓	✓	✗	✓	✓	✓	✗	12
Emmanuel	✗	✓	✓	✓	✓	✓	✓	✓	✓	✓	✓	✓	✓	✓	✓	✓	15
Erskine	✗	✓	✗	✓	✓	✓	✓	✓	✓	✗	✓	✗	✓	✓	✓	✗	12
Ferrum	✗	✓	✗	✓	✓	✓	✓	✓	✓	✗	✓	✗	✓	✓	✓	✓	12
Francis Marion	✗	✓	✗	✓	✗	✗	✗	✓	✓	✗	✓	✗	✓	✓	✓	✗	8
King	✓	✓	✗	✓	✓	✓	✗	✓	✓	✓	✓	✓	✓	✓	✓	✓	14
Lees–McRae	✗	✓	✗	✓	✓	✗	✓	✓	✓	✓	✓	✗	✓	✓	✓	✗	11
Mount Olive	✗	✓	✗	✓	✓	✓	✓	✓	✓	✗	✓	✗	✓	✓	✓	✓	12
North Greenville	✗	✓	✗	✓	✗	✓	✓	✓	✓	✗	✓	✗	✓	✓	✓	✗	10
Shorter	✗	✓	✗	✓	✗	✓	✓	✓	✓	✗	✓	✗	✓	✓	✓	✗	10
Southern Wesleyan	✗	✓	✗	✓	✗	✓	✓	✓	✓	✗	✗	✗	✓	✓	✓	✗	9
UNC Pembroke	✗	✓	✗	✓	✗	✓	✗	✓	✓	✓	✗	✗	✓	✓	✓	✗	9
Young Harris	✗	✓	✗	✓	✗	✓	✓	✓	✓	✗	✓	✗	✗	✗	✓	✗	8
Totals	4+5 (Note: Affiliate members Coker, Lander, Montevallo, Mars Hill, and Wingate.)	16	3	16	8+3 (Note: Affiliate members Mars Hill, Mount St. Mary's, and Wingate.)	14	13	16	16	7+5 (Note: Affiliate members Carson–Newman, Catawba, Lenoir–Rhyne, Mars Hill, and Wingate.)	14	3+4 (Note: Affiliate members Concord, Lenoir–Rhyne, Newberry, and Wingate.)	14	14	16	4+5 (Note: Affiliate members Allen, Bluefield State, Emory & Henry, Lincoln Memorial, and Newberry.)	178+23

=== Other sponsored sports by school ===
School	Men	Women			
School	Golf	Beach volleyball (Note: De facto Division I sport. The NCAA operates a single championship event in beach volleyball that is open to members of all three divisions. Schools in Divisions I and II operate under the same scholarship limits in both sports. Will be a part of Conference Carolinas as a joint conference with SAC in 2024.)	Equestrian (Note: Part of the NCAA Emerging Sports for Women program.)	Field Hockey	Triathlon (Note: Becomes an official CC sport in 2026–27.)
Barton				SAC	
Belmont Abbey				SAC	IND
Converse			IND	SAC	
Emmanuel		SAC (Note: De facto South Atlantic Conference affiliate as part of South Atlantic Conference Carolinas.)			(Note: Emmanuel will upgrade triathlon from club level to full varsity status in 2026–27.)
Erskine		SAC			
Francis Marion	Big Sky (Note: Francis Marion men's golf currently plays in Division I.)				
Ferrum			IND		
King					IND

In addition to the above:

- Belmont Abbey fields varsity teams in the non-NCAA sports of cycling (coeducational with men's and women's squads), men's bowling, and men's triathlon. It also considers its band, cheerleaders (male and female), and dance team (all-female) to be varsity athletes.
- Chowan fields a coeducational esports team, and also considers its cheerleaders (male and female) to be varsity athletes.
- Converse fields a coeducational esports team, and its equestrian program is also coeducational, although only women compete in NCAA-recognized events.
- Emmanuel fields teams in four non-NCAA sports. Three teams are coeducational: archery (with men's and women's squads), bass fishing, and clay target shooting. The fourth is in men's bowling. It also considers its cheerleaders (male and female) to be varsity athletes.
- Erskine fields a men's beach volleyball team, as well as coeducational teams in the non-NCAA sports of bass fishing and rodeo.
- King fields a coeducational esports team, plus coeducational teams in the non-NCAA sports of cycling (men's and women's squads) and bass fishing. It also considers its cheerleaders (male and female) and dance team (all-female, though listed on its athletics website as coeducational) to be varsity athletes.
- Lees–McRae fields a varsity team in the non-NCAA sport of cycling (coeducational with men's and women's squads). It also considers its cheerleaders (male and female) to be varsity athletes. Unlike other CC members that field esports teams, Lees–McRae treats its esports program as a club sport.

== See also ==
- NCAA Men's National Collegiate Volleyball Championship, in which the CC champion receives an automatic berth
