= 2008 NCAA Division II baseball tournament =

- Season: 2008
- Finals site: GCS Ballpark; Sauget, Illinois
- Champions: Mount Olive (1st title)
- Runner-up: Ouachita Baptist (1st CWS Appearance)
- Winning coach: Carl Lancaster (1st title)
- MOP: Steve Smith, P (Ouachita Baptist)
- Attendance: 16,555

The 2008 NCAA Division II baseball tournament was the postseason tournament hosted by the NCAA to determine the national champion of baseball among its Division II members at the end of the 2008 NCAA Division II baseball season.

The final, eight-team double elimination tournament, also known as the College World Series, was played at GCS Ballpark in Sauget, Illinois from May 24–31, 2008. This was the first Division II College World Series since 1984 to not be played in Montgomery, Alabama.

Mount Olive defeated Ouachita Baptist in the championship game, 6–2, to claim the Trojans' first Division II national title.

== Bracket ==
=== College World Series ===
- Note: Losers of each round are shifted to the opposing bracket.

First Rounds; May 24–27, 2008	Second Rounds; May 26–May 28, 2008
Sonoma State	10
Shippensburg	1
Sonoma State	6^{19}
Central Missouri	5
Central Missouri	13^{11}
Franklin Pierce	12
Bracket One
Ouachita Baptist	12
Tampa	10
Ashland	5
Ouachita Baptist	12
Ouachita Baptist	5
Mount Olive	6
Mount Olive	18
Ashland	7
Tampa	5
Ashland	6
Bracket Two
Shippensburg	9
Franklin Pierce	2
Central Missouri	5
Shippensburg	1

Semifinals; May 29, 2008
Sonoma State	1	1
Ouachita Baptist	2	2
Mount Olive	5
Central Missouri	3

Championship; May 30–31, 2008
Ouachita Baptist	2
Mount Olive	6

== See also ==
- 2008 NCAA Division I baseball tournament
- 2008 NCAA Division III baseball tournament
- 2008 NAIA World Series
