= University of Mount Olive =

Baptist university in Mount Olive, North Carolina, US

Coordinates: 35.2084309°N 78.068759°W

- Former names: Mount Allen Junior College (1951–1956); Mount Olive Junior College (1956–1970); Mount Olive College (1970–2013)
- Motto: Collegium Christianum Pro Homnibus et Mulieribus (Latin)
- Motto in English: A Christian College for Men and Women
- Type: Private university
- Established: 1951; 75 years ago
- Religious affiliation: Original Free Will Baptists
- Endowment: US$38,000,000 (2018)
- President: H. Edward Croom
- Academic staff: 63 full-time, 94 part-time
- Undergraduates: 2,239 (fall 2022)
- Location: Mount Olive, North Carolina, United States
- Campus: Rural, 250 acres (100 ha)
- Colors: Green & white
- Nickname: Trojans
- Sporting affiliations: NCAA Division II – Conference Carolinas
- Mascot: Trojan (Official)
- Website: umo.edu
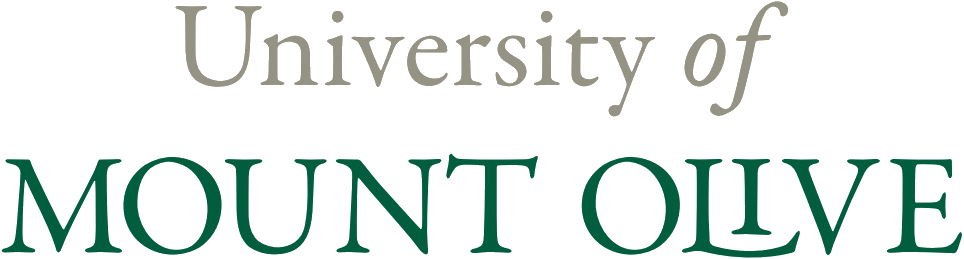

The University of Mount Olive (UMO or Mount Olive) is a private university in Mount Olive, North Carolina, United States. Chartered in 1951, the university is sponsored by the Original Free Will Baptist Convention and accredited by the Southern Association of Colleges and Schools Commission on Colleges. A member of the NCAA Division II Conference Carolinas, its sports teams compete as the Mount Olive Trojans.

== History ==
=== Early history and founding ===
The university's roots and educational philosophy can be traced as early as 1897 when Free Will Baptists in Pitt County, North Carolina, citing a growing need for education in the community, led a discourse on education within the church. These efforts ultimately resulted in the founding of the Free Will Baptist Theological Seminary and its successor institution, Eureka College, both in Ayden, North Carolina, to educate ministers and provide a liberal arts education to the local constituency.

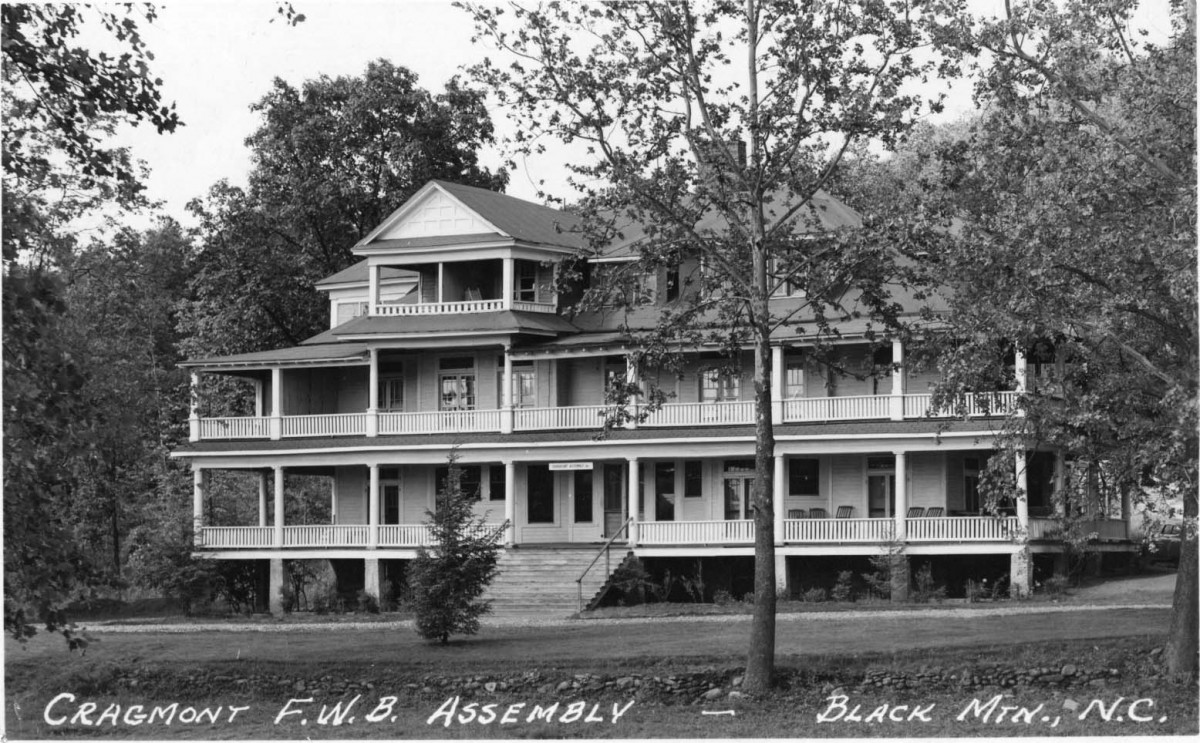
Cragmont Assembly, Black Mountain, North Carolina, location of the college's campus from 1952 to 1953

After a catastrophic fire destroyed the administration building in 1931, Eureka College ceased operations, and the Free Will Baptist church's efforts to fulfill its educational vision were reinvested in the founding of what is today the University of Mount Olive.

From its inception as a junior college, the University of Mount Olive has been sponsored by the Original Free Will Baptist Convention. The institution was chartered in 1951 and opened in 1952 at Cragmont Assembly, the Free Will Baptist summer retreat grounds near Black Mountain, North Carolina, under the direction of the Reverend Lloyd Vernon. The school was originally called Mount Allen Junior College, taking its name from the mountain near Cragmont.

=== 1953–1970 ===
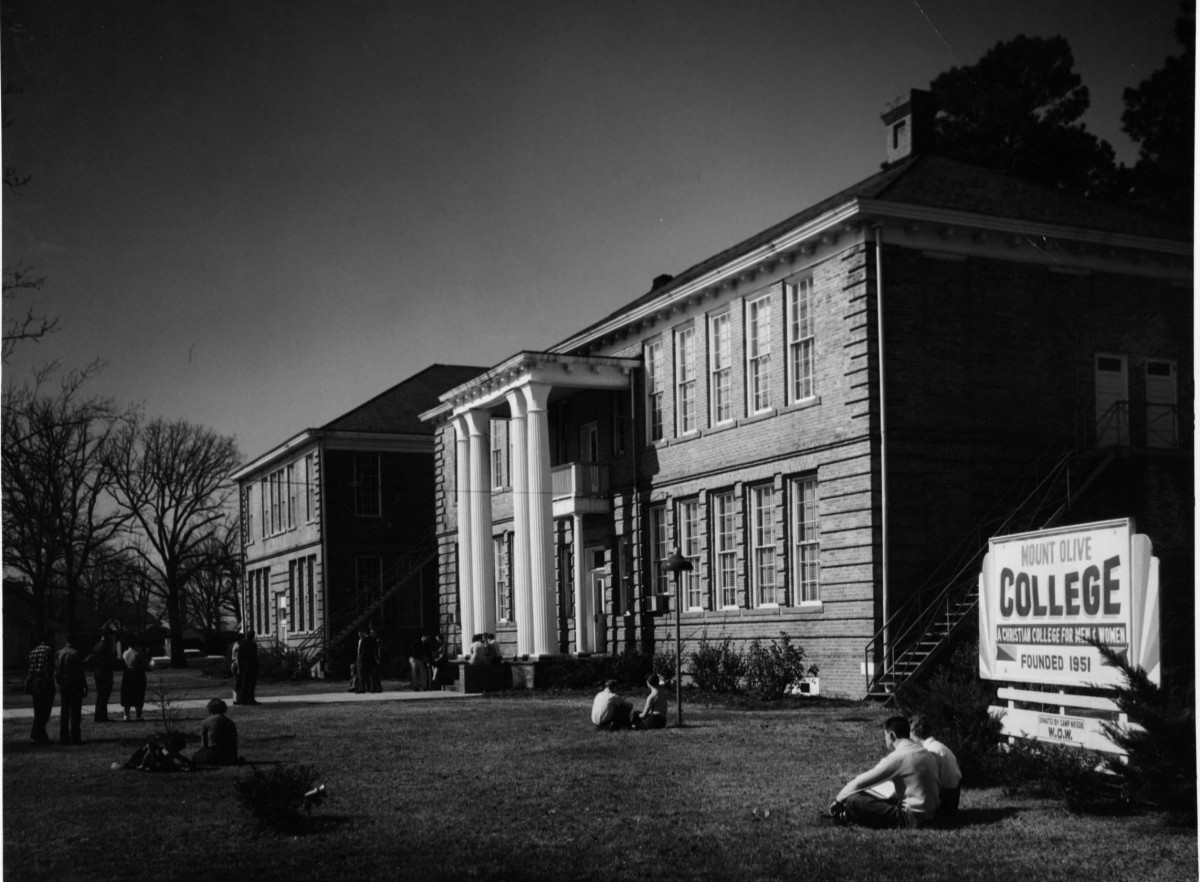
First campus building in Mount Olive, North Carolina

In September 1953, the college moved to Mount Olive, North Carolina, nearer the center of denominational strength in the eastern region of the state. Under the leadership of the Reverend David W. Hansley, chairman of the board of directors, plans were made to develop a junior college offering programs in arts and sciences and business. The Reverend W. Burkette Raper was elected president in the summer of 1954, and in September the college began its first collegiate year with an enrollment of twenty-two students.

In 1956, the name "Mount Allen Junior College" was changed to "Mount Olive Junior College". In that same year, plans were launched for an enlarged campus which today consists of 250 acres. In September 1970, the college's name was officially changed to Mount Olive College.

=== 1971–1990 ===
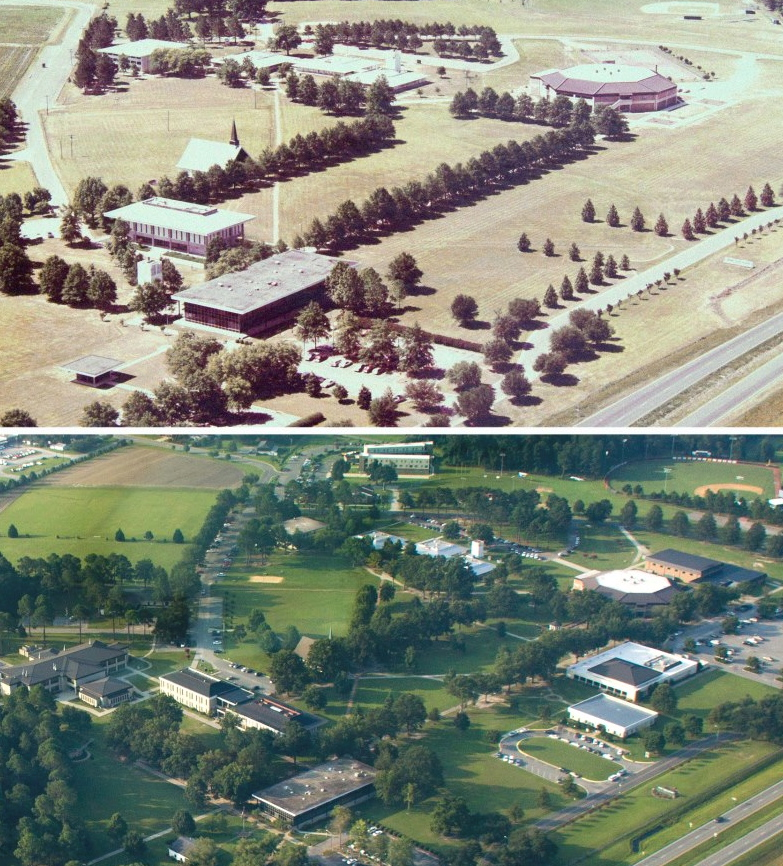
Aerial view comparisons of the main campus (Top to Bottom: circa 1980, 2012)

In 1975, the college began an educational program in Goldsboro, North Carolina at Seymour Johnson Air Force Base. Two years later, the Original Free Will Baptist Convention requested that the board of trustees of Mount Olive College work aggressively toward making the college a four-year institution. The 1979 session of the convention endorsed the projected timetable set by the college's board of trustees to add the junior year in 1984 and the senior year in 1985.

In 1986, the Southern Association of Colleges and Schools Commission on Colleges accredited Mount Olive College as a four-year institution to award associate and baccalaureate degrees.

=== 1991–2008 ===
In the fall of 1994, the transfer of all operations to the main campus was complete and the original downtown campus was sold. In addition to the satellite campuses at New Bern and Seymour Johnson Air Force Base, the college expanded operations to reach non-traditional students at four other locations in North Carolina (Wilmington, Research Triangle Park, Washington, and Smithfield).

In January 1995, the board of trustees selected J. William Byrd as the third president. Byrd assumed the duties of the office on January 31 and was inaugurated on September 30.

=== 2008–present ===
In July 2009, an additional location was opened in Jacksonville, North Carolina in 2009, and academic delivery of some of the college's programs became available online in 2012. The same month, Philip P. Kerstetter, became the college's fourth president. Two years later, Mount Olive College officially changed its name to the University of Mount Olive.

In July 2018, David L. Poole became the university's fifth president. He was succeeded in 2020 by H. Edward Croom who was named the university's interim president. Later that year, the board named him the sixth president of the university.

=== Presidents ===
University presidents include:

	President	Tenure	Notable events during tenure
1.	Lloyd Vernon	1952–1954
2.	W. Burkette Raper	1954–1995	Youngest and longest-tenured president of University of Mount Olive
3.	J. William Byrd	1995–2009
4.	Philip P. Kerstetter	2009–2018	Led renaming of Mount Olive College to University of Mount Olive; led first Master's program offerings
5.	David L. Poole	2018–2020
6.	H. Edward Croom	2020–Present

== Campus ==
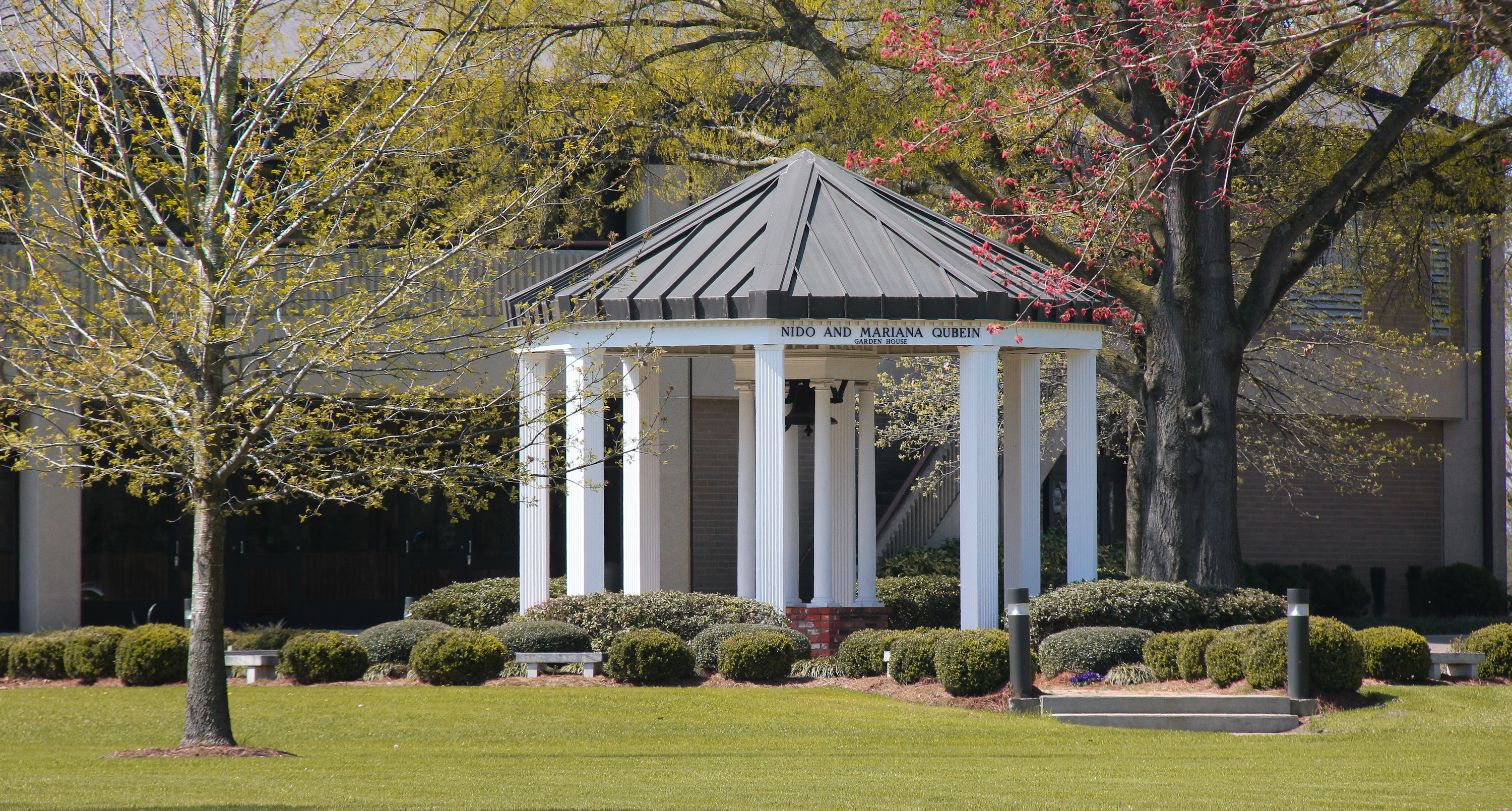
Nido and Mariana Qubein Garden House

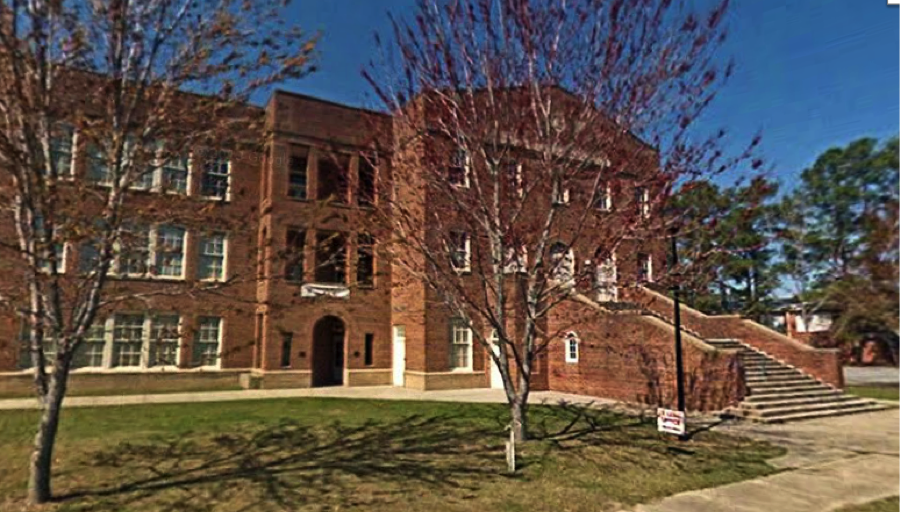
J. William and Marvis E. "Marcy" Byrd Apartment Complex

The university's main campus is located on 250 acres of land at the edge of the Mount Olive Historic District in the town of Mount Olive, NC. Mount Olive is 60 miles southeast of Raleigh, North Carolina and 75 miles northwest of Wilmington, North Carolina.

Academic rankings

Regional
- U.S. News & World Report: 78 of 135

National
- Washington Monthly: 481 of 604

== Library system ==
Moye Library is named for Reverend and Mrs. J. C. Moye who were active in the Free Will Baptist denomination. In 2006, the library facilities were expanded with the completion of the companion Communications Building. The first floor of the facility houses the reference desk, reference collection, periodicals collection, the Everett Room, the Sawyer Room, and most staff offices. The Circulation Desk is located on the first floor of the main lobby joining the Communications Building and Moye Library.

Moye Library
- Location: Mount Olive, North Carolina
- Established: 1968

Collection
- Size: 100,000+ volumes

Access and use
- Population served: 4,000 students & 260 faculty (full-time and adjunct)

Other information
- Director: Pamela R. Wood
- Website: https://umo.edu/library/

The library's special collections include:

- The Free Will Baptist Historical Collection, a separate library on the history of the Free Will Baptist denomination.
- The University Archives Collection, dedicated to the preservation of materials of and about the university for use by the general public.
- The Jacques Hnizdovsky Collection, a collection of woodcuts and other prints by the Ukrainian artist, Jacques Hnizdovsky. This is the largest collection of his works in the world.

== Alma mater ==
The alma mater, written by Daniel W. Fagg, Jr., former academic dean, and professor of social sciences, and set to music by Eugene S. Mauney, professor of music, was first published in the college's annual yearbook Olive Leaves in 1958.

== Athletics ==
The University of Mount Olive is a member of NCAA Division II and the Conference Carolinas. The university has intercollegiate teams in the women's sports of lacrosse, track and field, volleyball, cross country, soccer, basketball, tennis, golf, field hockey, flag football, wrestling, and softball. Men's sports at the university include lacrosse, track and field, volleyball, cross country, soccer, basketball, tennis, golf, wrestling, and baseball. Cheerleading is offered as a co-ed sport.

The Trojans baseball team won the 2008 NCAA Division II Baseball National Championship.

UMO has also been awarded the Hawn Cup for best athletic performance in the conference three times.

== Notable people ==
=== Alumni ===
- Ernestine Bazemore – member of the North Carolina Senate
- Carter Capps '11 – MLB pitcher
- Tom Layne '07 – MLB pitcher
- Justin Melton '09 – professional basketball player
- Steve Mintz '90 – MLB pitcher
- Mike Moore '16 – professional basketball player
- Larry Pittman – member of the North Carolina House of Representatives
- Nido Qubein '66 – motivational speaker and president of High Point University
- Clarence Rose – professional golfer
- Kodi Whitley – MLB pitcher
- Bruce Zimmermann '17 – MLB pitcher

=== Faculty ===
- Charles Orville Whitley – taught business law and later became a U.S. Congressperson
