= Original Free Will Baptist Convention =

The Original Free Will Baptist Convention is a North Carolina–based body of Free Will Baptists that split from the National Association of Free Will Baptists in 1961.

The Original Free Will Baptist State Convention was established in 1913. In 1935 the State Convention became a charter member of the National Association. The North Carolina convention had developed along lines with slightly different polity from the midwestern and northern Free Will Baptists. They held to a more connectional form of government, and believed the annual conference could settle disputes in and discipline a local church. This view, different educational philosophies, and the desire of the North Carolina convention to operate its own press and Sunday School publishing created tensions that ended in division. The majority of Free Will Baptist churches in North Carolina withdrew from the National Association, while a minority withdrew from the State Convention to maintain affiliation with the National Association.

Headquarters of the State Convention are in Mount Olive, North Carolina. The Convention sponsors the Free Will Baptist Children's Home, Inc. in Middlesex, North Carolina (established 1920), the University of Mount Olive in Mount Olive, North Carolina (chartered 1951), and operates the Free Will Baptist Press in Ayden. It supports foreign missionaries in Bulgaria, India, Mexico, Nepal, Liberia, and the Philippines.

In 1991 they reported over 33,000 members in 236 churches that were organized into 7 conferences. In 2003, the Convention had grown to about 250 churches. By 2010, it was reported that there were 244 churches in the United States and had 36,823 members. Most of the churches are in eastern North Carolina.

== Sources ==
- An Introduction to the Original Free Will Baptists, by Floyd B. Cherry
- Baptists Around the World, by Albert W. Wardin, Jr.
- Encyclopedia of Religion in the South, Samuel S. Hill, editor
