= Mount Olive Trojans =

Intercollegiate sports teams of University of Mount Olive

- University: University of Mount Olive
- Nickname: Trojans
- NCAA: Division II
- Conference: Conference Carolinas (primary); South Atlantic (field hockey)
- Athletic director: Joey Higginbotham
- Location: Mount Olive, North Carolina
- Varsity teams: 21 (10 men's, 11 women's)
- Basketball arena: Kornegay Arena
- Baseball stadium: Scarborough Field
- Softball stadium: Nancy Chapman Cassell Field
- Soccer stadium: Amon Field
- Lacrosse stadium: Ray McDonald, Sr. Sports Complex
- Tennis venue: John Neal Walker Tennis Center
- Colors: Green and white
- Website: umotrojans.com
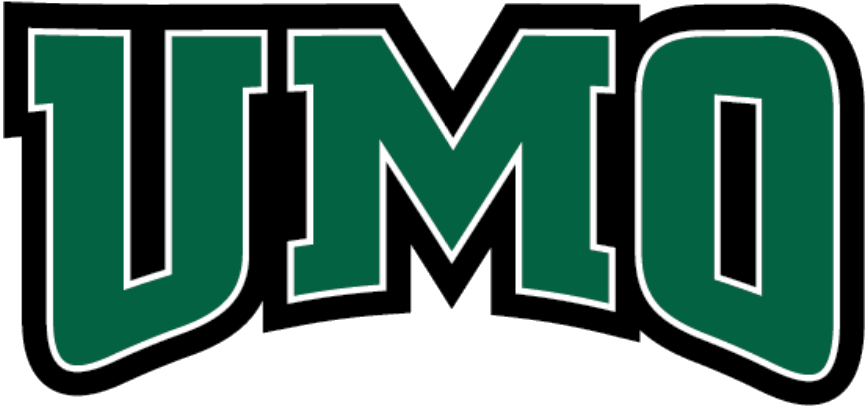

Team NCAA championships
- 1

The Mount Olive Trojans are the athletic teams that represent the University of Mount Olive, located in Mount Olive, North Carolina, in NCAA Division II intercollegiate sporting competitions. UMO's sports teams are known as the Trojans; their colors are green and white. The Trojans participate as a member of Conference Carolinas at the NCAA Division II level in 22 sports:

== Varsity sports ==
Varsity sports at Mount Olive include:

Men's sports	Women's sports
Baseball	Softball
Basketball	Basketball
Cross Country	Cross Country
Golf	Golf
Soccer	Soccer
Tennis	Tennis
Track and Field	Track and Field
Volleyball	Volleyball
Lacrosse	Lacrosse
Wrestling	Wrestling
	Field Hockey
	Flag Football

== Championships ==
=== Team national championships ===
Sport	Association	Division	Year	Opponent	Score
Baseball (1)	NCAA	Division II	2008	Ouachita Baptist	6–2

=== 2008 Baseball Team ===
The Mount Olive baseball team won the 2008 NCAA Division II Baseball National Championship. The baseball team posted a 58–6 record that year, winning the Conference Carolinas and NCAA II South Atlantic Regional titles. The Trojans defeated Ouachita Baptist (Ark.) 6–5 in the first round of the National Finals and Ashland (Ohio) 18–7 in the second round. Mount Olive defeated Central Missouri 5–3 in the semifinal round and claimed its first-ever national championship with a 6–2 victory over Ouachita Baptist in the title game. The national championship game was televised live on CBS College Sports. The National Finals took place in Sauget, Illinois.

=== Other ===
Mount Olive teams have made 30 NCAA Division II tournament appearances. Mount Olive teams have won a combined 39 Conference Carolinas regular season and/or tournament championships.

Mount Olive was the recipient of the 2011–12 Joby Hawn Cup, awarded to the top athletics program in Conference Carolinas. In addition to the overall award, Mount Olive also captured the Men's Sports Hawn Cup and the Women's Sports Hawn Cup.
