= Anderson Trojans =

- University: Anderson University
- Nickname: Trojans
- NCAA: Division II
- Conference: South Atlantic (primary)
- Athletic director: Bert Epting
- Location: Anderson, South Carolina
- Varsity teams: 18 (8 men's, 9 women's, 1 co-ed)
- Football stadium: Spero Financial Field
- Basketball arena: Abney Athletic Center
- Baseball stadium: Anderson Memorial Stadium
- Softball stadium: Softball Complex
- Soccer stadium: Spero Financial Field
- Lacrosse stadium: Spero Financial Field
- Tennis venue: Trojan Tennis Complex
- Colors: Black and gold
- Mascot: Troy the Trojan
- Website: autrojans.com
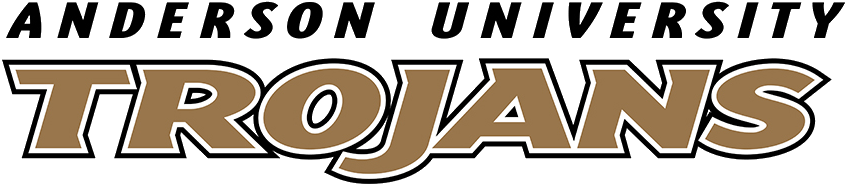

Individual and relay NCAA champions
- 1

The Anderson Trojans are the athletic teams that represent Anderson University, located in Anderson, South Carolina, in intercollegiate sports at the Division II level of the National Collegiate Athletic Association (NCAA). The Trojans have primarily competed in the South Atlantic Conference since the 2010–11 academic year.

Anderson competes in nineteen intercollegiate varsity sports. Men's sports include baseball, basketball, cross country, golf, lacrosse, soccer, tennis, and track and field (both indoor and outdoor); while women's sports include basketball, cross country, golf, lacrosse, soccer, softball, tennis, track and field (both indoor and outdoor), and volleyball. Football will be added as an additional men's sport in 2024.

== Conference affiliations ==
NCAA

- Conference Carolinas (1998–2010)
- South Atlantic Conference (2010–present)

== Varsity teams ==
Men's sports	Women's sports
Baseball	Basketball
Basketball	Cross country
Cross country	Golf
Football	Lacrosse
Golf	Soccer
Lacrosse	Softball
Soccer	Tennis
Tennis	Track and field^{†}
Track and field^{†}	Volleyball
† – Track and field includes both indoor and outdoor

== Championships ==
=== Individual ===
The Anderson Trojans have won two NCAA individual championship at the Division II level.
Men's wrestling (1): 2005 (Careef Robertson, 174) and Jonathan Jackson 157 in 2007

=== Other ===
The Trojans have won five national championships that were not bestowed by the NCAA:
Women's basketball (4): 1974, 1975, 1976, 1977 (AIAW Junior/Community College)
Baseball (1): 1994 (NCCAA)

== Notable alumni ==
- Rob Stanifer - professional baseball player
- Trey Britton - professional basketball player
- AJ Styles - professional wrestler
- Lauren Allan - professional soccer player
