= List of Augustana University alumni =

Augustana University is a private Lutheran university in Sioux Falls, South Dakota, United States. The university was called Augustana College and Seminary from 1860 to 1918, Augustana College and Normal School from 1918 to 1926, and Augustana College from 1926 to 2015. Established in 1889, the Lutheran Normal School merged with Augustana in 1918.

== Academia ==
- David Amland, painter and professor at Midland University
- Robert M. Berdahl, 1959, college and university administrator, former chancellor of UC Berkeley
- Larry Brendtro, author and professor emeritus of special education in the field of behavior disorders at Augustana University, University of Illinois and The Ohio State University
- Allan C. Carlson, scholar and former professor of history at Hillsdale College
- Charlotte Erickson, 1945, Paul Mellon chair of American History at the University of Cambridge
- Donald Evenson, 1964, biologist and chemist, professor at South Dakota State University
- Damien Fair, 1998, behavioral neuroscientist, professor at the University of Minnesota, and director of the Masonic Institute for the Developing Brain
- Elizabeth Glidden, lawyer, public policy professional, adjunct faculty at Humphrey School of Public Affairs in Minnesota
- Gordon Iseminger, 1959, professor of history at the University of North Dakota
- Raymond Olson, 1934, president of California Lutheran College
- Ola Ordal, (1898, Lutheran Normal School), president of Pacific Lutheran College
- Robert J. Swieringa, 1964, dean and is a professor emeritus of the S.C. Johnson Graduate School of Management at Cornell University
- Robert T. Wagner, 1954, president of South Dakota State University

== Business ==
- Linda Avey, 1982, co-founder of 23andme
- Jeffrey W. Hayzlett, chief marketing officer of the Eastman Kodak Company
- Dale Hoiberg, 1971, senior vice president and editor-in-chief of Encyclopædia Britannica

== Entertainment ==
- Phil Bruns, actor known for Mary Hartman, Mary Hartman
- Myron Floren, the accordionist on The Lawrence Welk Show between 1950 and 1980
- Mary Hart, 1972, television host known for Entertainment Tonight
- Jonathan May, cellist and conductor
- David Soul, non-degreed, actor known for Starsky & Hutch

== Law ==
- Max Gors, South Dakota circuit judge, acting associate justice of the South Dakota Supreme Court, and South Dakota secretary of commerce
- David Lillehaug, 1976, associate justice of the Minnesota Supreme Court and United States Attorney for the District of Minnesota

== Military and defense ==
- Jarret Brachman, 2002, author, terrorism expert, and former director of research at West Point's Combating Terrorism Center
- Oscar Randolph Fladmark, 1948, fighter pilot who flew 164 "no-injury" combat missions in World War II and the Korean War
- John Hamre, 1972, United States Deputy Secretary of Defense and Comptroller of the Department of Defense

== Politicians ==
- Daniel Ahlers, 1997, South Dakota House of Representatives and South Dakota Senate
- Debra R. Anderson, 1971, director of the White House Office of Intergovernmental Affairs and Speaker of the South Dakota House of Representatives
- Barney A. Boos, 1938, South Dakota House of Representatives
- Nancy Erickson,1984, Secretary of the United States Senate
- Richard O. Gregerson, 1957, South Dakota Senate
- Roger Haugo, 1958, South Dakota House of Representatives
- Ried Holien, South Dakota Senate
- Roger W. Hunt, 1959, South Dakota House of Representatives
- Arthur Larson, United States Under Secretary of Labor and director of the United States Information Agency
- Jenifer Loon, 1985, Minnesota House of Representatives
- Dave Munson, 1973, South Dakota State House of Representatives and South Dakota Senate
- Michael J. O'Connor, South Dakota State House of Representatives and South Dakota Senate
- Doug Peterson, Minnesota House of Representatives
- Lee Schoenbeck, 1980, South Dakota Senate president pro tempore
- Jamie Smith, 1993, South Dakota House of Representatives
- David J. Strom, South Dakota House of Representatives
- Hans Ustrud (1895, Lutheran Normal School), lieutenant governor of South Dakota and superintendent of public instruction
- Lynn Wardlow, Minnesota House of Representatives
- Susan Wismer, 1978, South Dakota State House of Representatives and South Dakota Senate

== Religion ==
- Megan Rohrer, 2001, bishop of the Sierra Pacific Synod of the Evangelical Lutheran Church in American, activist for the homeless and LGBTQ+ rights

== Science ==
- Brent Loken, 1994, conservation scientist and Global Food lead scientist for World Wide Fund for Nature

== Sports ==
- Tom Brown, 1985, professional football player
- Mike Daly, 1971, college football coach
- Lyle Eidsness, 1963, college football coach
- C. J. Ham, 2015, professional football player
- Ross Horning, professional baseball player in the minor leagues and a professor of Russian history at Creighton University
- Gary Hudson, 1971, college women's basketball coach
- Daniel Jansen, 2016, professional basketball player
- Les Josephson, 1964, professional football player
- Kevin Kaesviharn, 1998, professional football player
- Ted Kessinger, 1963, college football coach inducted into the College Football Hall of Fame
- Arvid Kramer, 1979, professional basketball player
- Corbin Lacina, 1993, professional football player
- Jordan Milbrath, professional baseball player
- Ben Newcomb, college football and baseball coach
- Chub Reynolds, college football coach
- Heath Rylance, 1994, professional football player with the Canadian Football League
- Brad Salem, 1992, college football coach
- Bryan Schwartz, 1994, professional football player
- Wayne Sheley, 1938, professional football player with the Canadian Football League
- Pete Sterbick, 2003, college football coach
- Brett Szabo, 1991, professional basketball player
- Roger Thomas, college football coach and athletics administrator
- Troy Westwood, 1991, professional football player with the Canadian Football League
