= Kevin Lofton =

American basketball player and coach

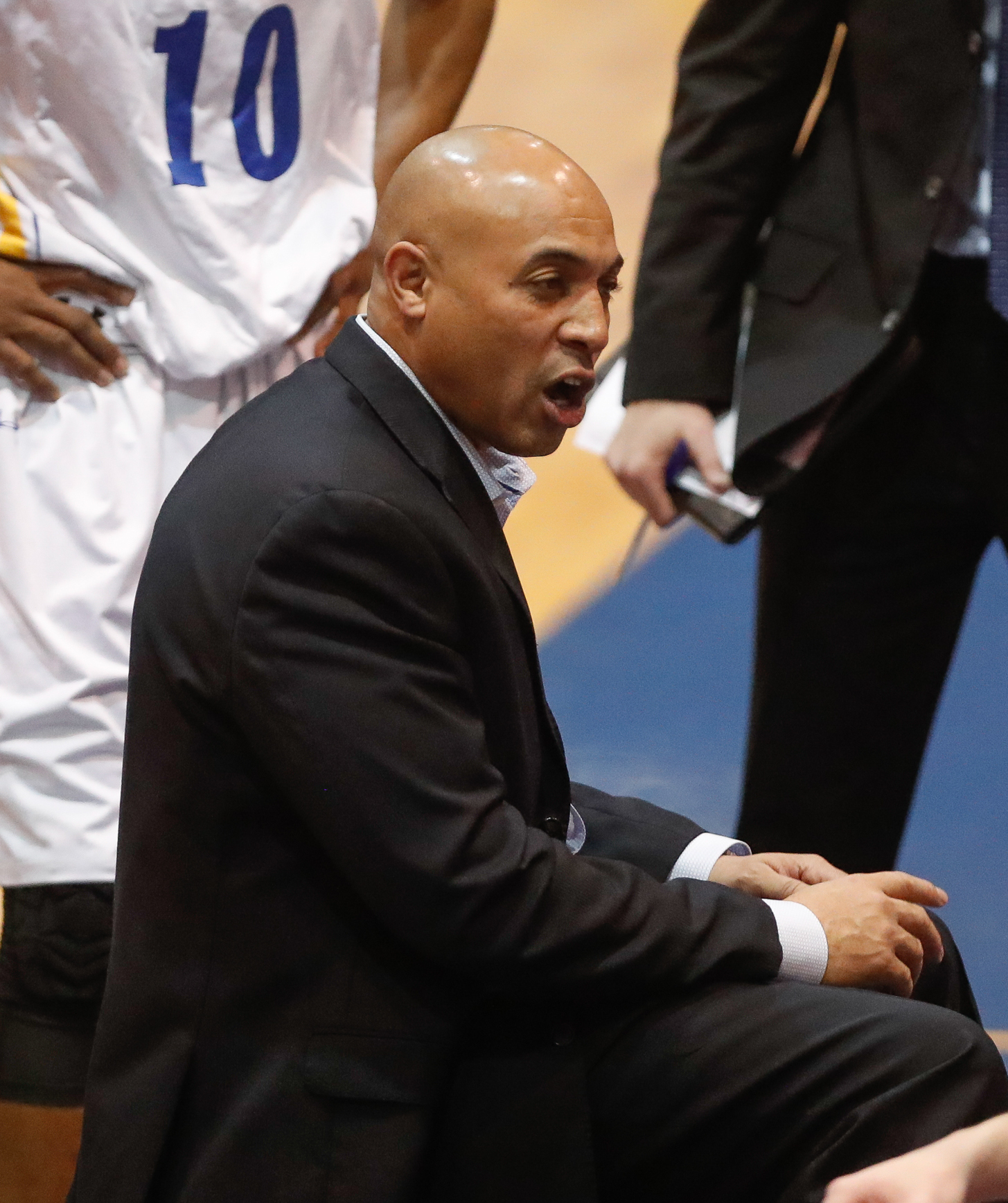
- Lofton in 2016

Current position
- Record: 67–54 (.554)

Biographical details
- Born: Buckeye, Arizona, U.S.

Playing career
- 1988–1990: Yavapai CC
- 1990–1992: Regis

Coaching career (HC unless noted)
- 1994–1995: Mid-Plains CC (assistant)
- 1995–1997: Nebraska–Kearney (GA)
- 1997–2001: Nebraska–Kearney (assistant)
- 2001–2005: Nebraska–Kearney (assoc. HC)
- 2005–2015: Nebraska–Kearney (co-HC)
- 2015–2024: Nebraska–Kearney

Head coaching record
- Overall: 67–54 (.554)
- Tournaments: NCAA: 1–1

Accomplishments and honors

Awards
- RMAC Coach of the year (2007)

Kevin Lofton is an American college basketball coach and the former head coach of the University of Nebraska at Kearney men's basketball team. Lofton was named the Lopers’ head coach on March 24, 2015, after spending the previous 10 seasons as co-head coach alongside longtime UNK coach Tom Kropp. Lofton has coached at UNK since 1995, getting his start as a graduate assistant. In his first year as UNK's head coach, he led the Lopers to their first NCAA Tournament in nine years.

== Early coaching career ==
Lofton began his coaching career at Mid-Plains Community College in North Platte, Nebraska, where he spent the 1994–95 campaign. After that, he began his tenure at the University of Nebraska at Kearney, where he spent two years as the team's graduate assistant coach before being promoted to an assistant coach in 1997 and furthermore to associate head coach prior to the 2001–02 season. Beginning with the 2005–06 season, he was named co-head coach. Over those 10 seasons, Lofton alongside Tom Kropp, guided the Lopers to a 156–125 record. During that time, the Lopers won the 2006 Rocky Mountain Athletic Conference Tournament championship and made two NCAA appearances.

== Head coaching career ==
=== Nebraska–Kearney ===
Following the retirement of longtime UNK coach Tom Kropp, who spent 39 years associated with the program, Lofton was named the 21st men's basketball head coach at UNK on March 24, 2015. Lofton became the fourth head coach for the Lopers since 1970. According to Athletic Director Paul Plinske, "Kevin (Lofton) has outstanding relationships with our student-athletes, is a passionate recruiter, a great teacher of the game and knows how to inspire our team to attain championship-level performances. Both Kevin and I know that there is a tremendous part of Coach Kropp in the foundation of this program. We are excited to build off the example Tom was and help this program reach its fullest potential."

In his first season at the helm of the Lopers, Lofton led UNK to a second-place finish in the Mid-America Intercollegiate Athletics Association. The Lopers advanced to the championship game of the MIAA Tournament, falling to Northwest Missouri State, 61–53, after playing their third game in three days. The Lopers earned an at-large bid in the NCAA tournament, their first appearance in nine seasons. In the first round of Central Regional, UNK defeated rival Fort Hays State 79–67. In the second round, the Lopers fell to eventual national champion Augustana. The Lopers had three All-MIAA selections during the 2015–16 campaign, including Connor Beranek, who now plays professionally in Europe. UNK also ranked fourth nationally in attendance, averaging 2,539 fans per competition.

Lofton's second season marked the first time in a decade that the Lopers recorded back-to-back 20-win seasons, after the Lopers went 20–10. The team reached the semifinals of the MIAA Tournament after replacing two of their top-three scorers from the previous year. The Lopers had four All-MIAA selections, bringing the total to seven all-conference players since Lofton became head coach.

== Head coaching record ==
Record table
Season	Team	Overall	Conference	Standing	Postseason
Nebraska–Kearney Lopers (Mid-America Intercollegiate Athletics Association) (2015–present)
2015–16	Nebraska–Kearney	21–12	14–8	T-2nd	NCAA D-II Second Round
2016–17	Nebraska–Kearney	20–10	12–7	3rd	
2017–18	Nebraska–Kearney	16–14	11–8	T–5th	
2018–19	Nebraska–Kearney	10–18	5–14	13th	
Nebraska–Kearney:		67–54 (.554)	42–37 (.472)		
Total:		67–54 (.554)			
National champion Postseason invitational champion Conference regular season champion Conference regular season and conference tournament champion Division regular season champion Division regular season and conference tournament champion Conference tournament champion

== Personal ==
A native of Buckeye, Arizona, Lofton played at Yavapai Community College before transferring to Regis University. He graduated from Regis with a bachelor's degree in communications and received his master's degree from UNK.
