= Hayzlett =

Hayzlett is a surname. Notable people with the surname include:

- Gary Hayzlett (born 1941), American politician
- Jeffrey W. Hayzlett (born 1960/61), American businessman
