= Damien Fair =

US cognitive neuroscientist

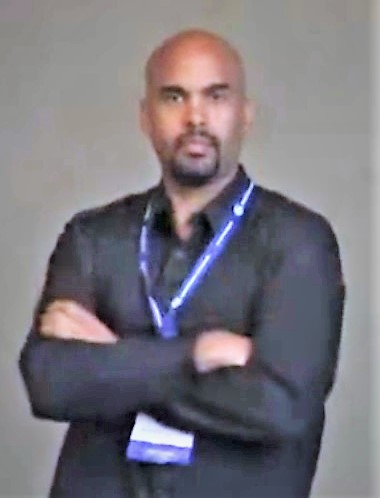
- Fair at the Flux Congress in 2013
- Education: Augustana University, BS (1998); Yale University School of Medicine, MMSc (2001); Washington University School of Medicine, PhD (2008)
- Awards: MacArthur Fellowship (2020), Presidential Early Career Award for Scientists and Engineers (2013)
- Scientific career
- Fields: Behavioral neuroscience
- Workplaces: University of Minnesota Medical School, 2020 – Present; Oregon Health & Science University, 2014 – 2020

Damien Fair is a behavioral neuroscientist, professor at the University of Minnesota, and director of the Masonic Institute for the Developing Brain. In 2020, he was selected for the MacArthur Fellows Program. In 2013, he received the Presidential Early Career Award for Scientists and Engineers. In 2026, he is a professor in the Institute of Child Development, Department of Pediatrics, and University of Minnesota Medical School.

== Early life and education ==
Fair was raised in Winona, Minnesota, by his mother, who was a county court reporter and stepfather, who worked for IBM. He attended Augustana University in Sioux Falls, South Dakota for college, where he majored in pre-medicine. There, he received his Bachelor of Arts degree in 1998 before entering a physician assistant training program at Yale University, which he completed in 2001. He then worked with stroke patients in Yale's neurology department, where he received his first experiences in biomedical research.

In 2003, he left Yale to pursue a Doctor of Philosophy degree in neuroscience at Washington University in St. Louis. His graduate research centered on the effects of stroke on the brain during infancy. There, he became interested in applying resting state fMRI, a method of functional magnetic resonance imaging (fMRI) used to understand how different regions of the brain interact when a research subject is not engaged in performing a specific task (i.e. in a resting state). In collaboration with Marcus Raichle, he developed a method to mine through traditional fMRI scans for this resting state information. He used this new methodology in concert with mathematical modeling to understand how brain networks develop over time.

After completing his Ph.D. degree in 2008, Fair built upon this resting-state fMRI technology as a postdoctoral fellow at Oregon Health & Science University, where he worked with clinical psychologists Joel Nigg and Bonnie Nagel to understand adolescent brain development, further refining the method to correct for artifacts that result from movement while research participants are in the fMRI scanner.

== Research ==
In 2014, Fair became an associate professor at Oregon Health & Science University. During that time, he co-founded Nous Imaging Inc with fellow neuroscientist Dr. Nico Dosenbach, MD, PhD. In 2020, he moved to the University of Minnesota, where he is now a Professor and the Redleaf Endowed Director of the Masonic Institute for the Developing Brain. The institute, which was announced in May 2020 with a $35 million endowment, is set to open in October 2021 and will focus on the early diagnosis, prevention, and treatment of neurodevelopmental disorders.

Fair's research centers on understanding how regions of the brain work together, taking advantage functional magnetic resonance imaging (fMRI) and methods he developed early in his career to map physical links between regions of the brain, known as the connectome. Each individual has a unique connectome that cognitively distinguishes them from one another, which Fair refers to as a "functional fingerprint". According to his group's calculations, 30% of this functional fingerprint is unique to an individual. His group also found that specific neural connectivity patterns could be inherited, predicting family members based on their connectomes.

Fair's group works to understand the similarities and differences in connectomes across humans as they carry out specific tasks and while their minds are at rest. His work focuses more specifically on investigating developmental conditions like attention deficit hyperactivity disorder and autism spectrum disorder, as well as other pediatric conditions. Understanding neural connections within a brain at rest provides his research team with a reading of baseline activity that allows them to understand distinct brain activity associated with neurological disorders. By characterizing Fair's research team has applied brain activity mapping to uncover heterogeneity in connectomes of children with autism, which can help characterize subtypes of the condition to more effectively devise therapies for children.

=== Service ===
Fair has applied his research findings to advocate for equitable education for neurodiverse children. He has presented his work in briefings on Capitol Hill, noting that the same condition may have different neurological underpinnings, making it difficult to identify the appropriate therapies and educational interventions. Fair also serves on a working group at the University of Minnesota that is overseeing the development of a low-cost, portable MRI machine to ensure that the emerging technology is deployed reliably and ethically.

== Awards and honors ==
- Presidential Early Career Award for Scientists and Engineers, 2013
- MacArthur Fellowship, 2020

== Personal life ==
Fair is married to Rahel Nardos, a urogynecologist and director for Global Women's Health at the Center for Global Health and Responsibility. They met while at Yale School of Medicine.
