= Tom Billeter =

American college basketball coach

Current position
- Title: Head coach
- Team: Emporia State
- Conference: The MIAA
- Record: 11–18

Biographical details
- Born: February 12, 1961 (age 65); Byron, Illinois, U.S.
- Education: Illinois

Coaching career (HC unless noted)
- 1985–1987: Arizona (assistant)
- 1987–1992: Rice (assistant)
- 1992–1997: North Dakota State
- 1997–1998: St. John's (assistant)
- 1998–2003: Texas A&M (assistant)
- 2003–2024: Augustana (SD)
- 2024–present: Emporia State

Head coaching record
- Overall: 501–292

Accomplishments and honors

Championships
- NCAA Division II champion (2016); 3× NSIC regular season champion (2015, 2016, 2022); 2× NSIC tournament champion (2015, 2016); NCC regular season champion (1995)

Awards
- Clarence Gaines Coach of the Year (2013) NABC Division II Coach of the Year (2016); 2x NSIC Coach of the Year (2016, 2022)

Tom Billeter (born February 12, 1961) is an American college basketball coach at Emporia State University in Emporia, Kansas. He previously has been the head coach at Augustana University (SD), North Dakota State University, as well as holding assistant coaching roles at a number of NCAA Division I colleges. He led Augustana to the 2016 NCAA Division II national championship and was named the national coach of the year in that season.

Billeter is from Byron, Illinois and obtained his undergraduate degree from the University of Illinois at Urbana–Champaign. He began his coaching career as a high school coach, then made his entry into college coaching as an assistant to Lute Olson at Arizona. He then moved to Rice under Scott Thompson. He was hired as head coach of then-Division II North Dakota State, where he led the Bison to four consecutive 20-win seasons in his five seasons at the helm (from 1992 to 1997). He left the school, despite his success, to take an assistant coaching job at high profile Division I program St. John's.

After a year at St. John's, then five seasons as an assistant at Texas A&M, Billeter was hired as head coach at Augustana in 2003. After going 42–69 in his first four seasons, he then led the Vikings to three consecutive NCAA Tournament appearances from 2008 to 2010. Billeter received the Clarence Gaines Coach of the Year award in 2013. In the 2014–15 season, the Vikings went 31–3 but were knocked out of the 2015 NCAA tournament by Northwest Missouri in the second round. The Vikings avenged the loss the following season as they went 34–2 behind national player of the year Dan Jansen and won the school's first national championship. Billeter was named the national Division II coach of the year by the National Association of Basketball Coaches (NABC) at the conclusion of the season.

On January 26, 2019, Billeter won his 300th game as Augustana Vikings coach.

== College coaching record ==
Record table
| Season | Team | Overall | Conference | Standing | Postseason |
|---|---|---|---|---|---|
North Dakota State (North Central Conference) (1992–1997)
| 1992–93 | North Dakota State | 12–17 | 7–11 | 8th | |
| 1993–94 | North Dakota State | 21–9 | 14–4 | 2nd | NCAA Division II regional final |
| 1994–95 | North Dakota State | 22–8 | 12–6 | T-1st | NCAA Division II second round |
| 1995–96 | North Dakota State | 20–9 | 12–6 | T-2nd | NCAA Division II second round |
| 1996–97 | North Dakota State | 22–7 | 12–6 | T-2nd | NCAA Division II second round |
| North Dakota State: | | 97–50 (.660) | 57–33 (.633) | | |
Augustana (North Central Conference) (2003–2008)
| 2003–04 | Augustana | 6–21 | 2–12 | 8th | |
| 2004–05 | Augustana | 8–20 | 1–11 | 7th | |
| 2005–06 | Augustana | 12–16 | 5–7 | 5th | |
| 2006–07 | Augustana | 16–12 | 3–9 | 5th | |
| 2007–08 | Augustana | 22–9 | 8–4 | 2nd | NCAA Division II second round |
Augustana (Northern Sun Intercollegiate Conference) (2008–2024)
| 2008–09 | Augustana | 21–10 | 13–7 | 6th | NCAA Division II regional final |
| 2009–10 | Augustana | 24–7 | 15–5 | 3rd | NCAA Division II regional final |
| 2010–11 | Augustana | 18–9 | 15–7 | 3rd | |
| 2011–12 | Augustana | 17–11 | 14–8 | T-4th | NCAA Division II first round |
| 2012–13 | Augustana | 22–9 | 15–7 | 3rd | NCAA Division II second round |
| 2013–14 | Augustana | 16–14 | 12–10 | T-9th | |
| 2014–15 | Augustana | 31–3 | 20–2 | T-1st | NCAA Division II second round |
| 2015–16 | Augustana | 34–2 | 21–1 | 1st | NCAA Division II champions |
| 2016–17 | Augustana | 24–9 | 16–6 | 4th | NCAA Division II second round |
| 2017–18 | Augustana | 16–14 | 10–12 | T-6th | |
| 2018–19 | Augustana | 18–11 | 14–8 | T-3rd | |
| 2019–20 | Augustana | 19–11 | 13–9 | T-6th | |
| 2020–21 | Augustana | 9–7 | 7–6 | 7th | |
| 2021–22 | Augustana | 26-4 | 17–2 | 1st | NCAA Division II regional final |
| 2022–23 | Augustana | 15–14 | 11–11 | 9th | |
| 2023–24 | Augustana | 19–11 | 13–9 | 7th | |
| Augustana: | | 393–224 (.637) | 245–153 (.616) | | |
Emporia State (The MIAA) (2024–present)
| 2024–25 | Emporia State | 11–18 | 8–11 | T-9th | |
| Emporia State: | | 11–18 (.379) | 8–11 (.421) | | |
| Total: | | 501–292 (.632) | | | |
National champion Postseason invitational champion Conference regular season champion Conference regular season and conference tournament champion Division regular season champion Division regular season and conference tournament champion Conference tournament champion
