= Aamland =

Aamland or Åmland is a Norwegian surname. Notable people with the surname include:

- Tolv Aamland (1893–1983), Norwegian politician
- Torkil Åmland (born 1966), Norwegian politician
- David Amland (1931–2010), American painter and art educator
