= Nellie Zabel Willhite =

American deaf female aviator

- Born: Eloise or Eleanor; November 22, 1892; Rapid City or Box Elder, South Dakota, U.S.
- Died: September 2, 1991 (aged 98); Sioux Falls, South Dakota, U.S.
- Years active: 1928–1944
- Known for: Pilot

Eloise or Eleanor "Nellie" Zabel Willhite (22 November 1892 – 2 September 1991) an American aviator and aviation pioneer. She was the first deaf woman to earn a pilot's license, as well as South Dakota's first female pilot.

== Life ==
Willhite was born in Rapid City or Box Elder, South Dakota, to Charley "Pard" Zabel and Lillian Madison Zabel. Willhite became deaf at age two due to measles. There have been sources that claim she was deafened at age four instead of two. She attended the South Dakota School for the Deaf and worked as a typist in Pierre until she enrolled in an aviation school. Willhite started flying lessons in November 1927, with her dad paying for it. She earned her pilot's license in 1928 Willhite was the thirteenth to sign up in a class of eighteen and made her first solo flight on 13 January 1928 after getting thirteen hours of instruction. She was the first female pilot to earn a pilot's license in South Dakota.

Willhite was a founding member of the Ninety-Nines, an organization which was founded in 1929 with 99 female pilots as founding members, and is dedicated to the advancement of aviation and support for women in aviation. Willhite started the first South Dakota chapter of the Ninety-Nines in 1941. She worked as a commercial pilot until 1944 (the first deaf person to do so), carrying airmail. She also worked as a barnstormer, specializing in flour bombing and balloon racing.

Willhite was inducted into the South Dakota Hall of Fame in 1978 and South Dakota Aviation Hall of Fame shortly before her death in 1991, and her plane the Pard is now on display at the Southern Museum of Flight in Birmingham, Alabama.
