= Raymond Olson =

2nd President of California Lutheran College
- In office 1963–1971
- Preceded by: Orville Dahl
- Succeeded by: Mark A. Mathews

Personal details
- Born: Raymond M. Olson; June 15, 1910; Eagle Grove, Iowa, U.S.
- Died: October 24, 2006 (aged 96)
- Education: Waldorf College; Augustana College; Luther Theological Seminary (MDiv)

Raymond M. Olson (June 15, 1910 – October 24, 2006) was the second President of California Lutheran College in Thousand Oaks, California, from 1963 to 1971. During Olson's tenure as president, the size of the college tripled.

A former general secretary for stewardship with the American Lutheran Church from 1952 to 1963, Olson had also served as a pastor for several congregations from 1939 to 1952. He also taught religion and speech at Waldorf College in Iowa from 1936 to 1938. He earned a liberal arts degree from Waldorf College in 1932, a bachelor's degree in history from Augustana College in 1934, and a master of divinity degree at Luther Theological Seminary in 1943. He was named president emeritus in 1983. Olson was also active in the community as founding chairman emeritus of the Alliance for the Arts. He was also a founder of the Conejo Future Foundation. The son of Norwegian farmers, Olson was born in Eagle Grove, Iowa in 1910 and was ordained into the Lutheran ministry in 1939.

== Cal Lutheran President ==
The 1964 accreditation report of the Western Association of Schools and Colleges summed up CLC's first years noting that there was a period of concern and divisiveness at the college. The report stated that President Olson, who came in the summer of 1963, faced the situation objectively and gained the confidence of the majority of faculty and administrators. Olson chose for his assistant to the president and acting dean a veteran public school administrator, Leif Harbo. To meet the needs of a growing student body, Dr. Olson hired John J. Nordberg, a former government official and Lutheran layman, to head his Development Office, and Dr. Bernard Hillila, former president of Suomi College, as dean of CLC. Reverend Lyle Gangsei was appointed dean of students and chaplain. The number of students increased from 509 in the fall of 1962 to 736 in the fall of 1964.

Raymond Olson submitted his resignation in May 1971. In recognition of his service to CLC, he was awarded an honorary Doctor of Laws degree at commencement with Dr. Carl Tambert, chairman of the board of regents, making the presentation. To further honor Olson, a Sine Qua Non dinner attended by over 300 people representing CLC and the community was held, sponsored by the Business and Industry Steering Committee of the college with Joseph Leggett, executive vice president of the Janss Corporation, as chairman. The symbol of development during Olson's tenure was the foundation of the Community Leaders Club in 1963. Originated by staff members, the club became reality when Honorary Thousand Oaks Mayor David Betts supported the concept, believing it would benefit the city as well as the college. 150 people attended the first dinner meeting in the fall of 1963.
