= Augustana Vikings men's basketball =

Augustana Vikings football may refer to:

- Augustana (Illinois) Vikings men's basketball, the college basketball team of Augustana College in Rock Island, Illinois
- Augustana (South Dakota) Vikings men's basketball, the college basketball team of Augustana University in Sioux Falls, South Dakota
