= Robert T. Wagner =

Robert Todd Wagner
- Born: October 30, 1932
- Died: January 17, 2011 (aged 78); Sioux Falls, South Dakota
- Monuments: Wagner Hall, South Dakota State University
- Occupation(s): professor and university administrator
- Years active: 1972–1997
- Known for: 17th president of South Dakota State University
- Spouse: Mary Mumford Wagner

Robert Todd Wagner (October 30, 1932 – January 17, 2011) was the 17th president of South Dakota State University from 1985 to 1997. A native South Dakotan, Wagner received his Ph.D. in sociology from SDSU in 1972. He was a teacher and administrator at South Dakota State University, including a brief time as chief administrator before his elevation to the presidency. Wagner was the second alumnus to be named president.

Robert graduated from Washington High School in Sioux Falls, then earned a bachelor's degree in philosophy from Augustana College in 1954.

== Career ==
Robert Wagner was a popular professor at South Dakota State. He began his career in administration as an assistant to the SDSU vice president for academic affairs. Wagner then served Dakota State College for a year as vice president. He was appointed president of South Dakota State University in 1985.

Wagner presided over a time of expansion at the university. The campus grew by more than 380,000 square feet (35,000 m^{2}). His administration formed the College of Education and Counseling, and constructed academic buildings including the Animal Disease Research Laboratory and the Northern Plains Biostress Laboratory. Wagner led the university's first capital campaign, raising $52 million. He was known for inclusive, thoughtful management, chosen as a marked change from previous turbulent years at SDSU.

Wagner also held an honorary Doctor of Humane Letters from Augustana College, honorary Doctor of Divinity from Seabury-Western Theological Seminary, and honorary Doctor of Humane Letters from the University of South Dakota. Upon his retirement from the SDSU presidency, the South Dakota Board of Regents awarded him an honorary Doctorate of Public Service.

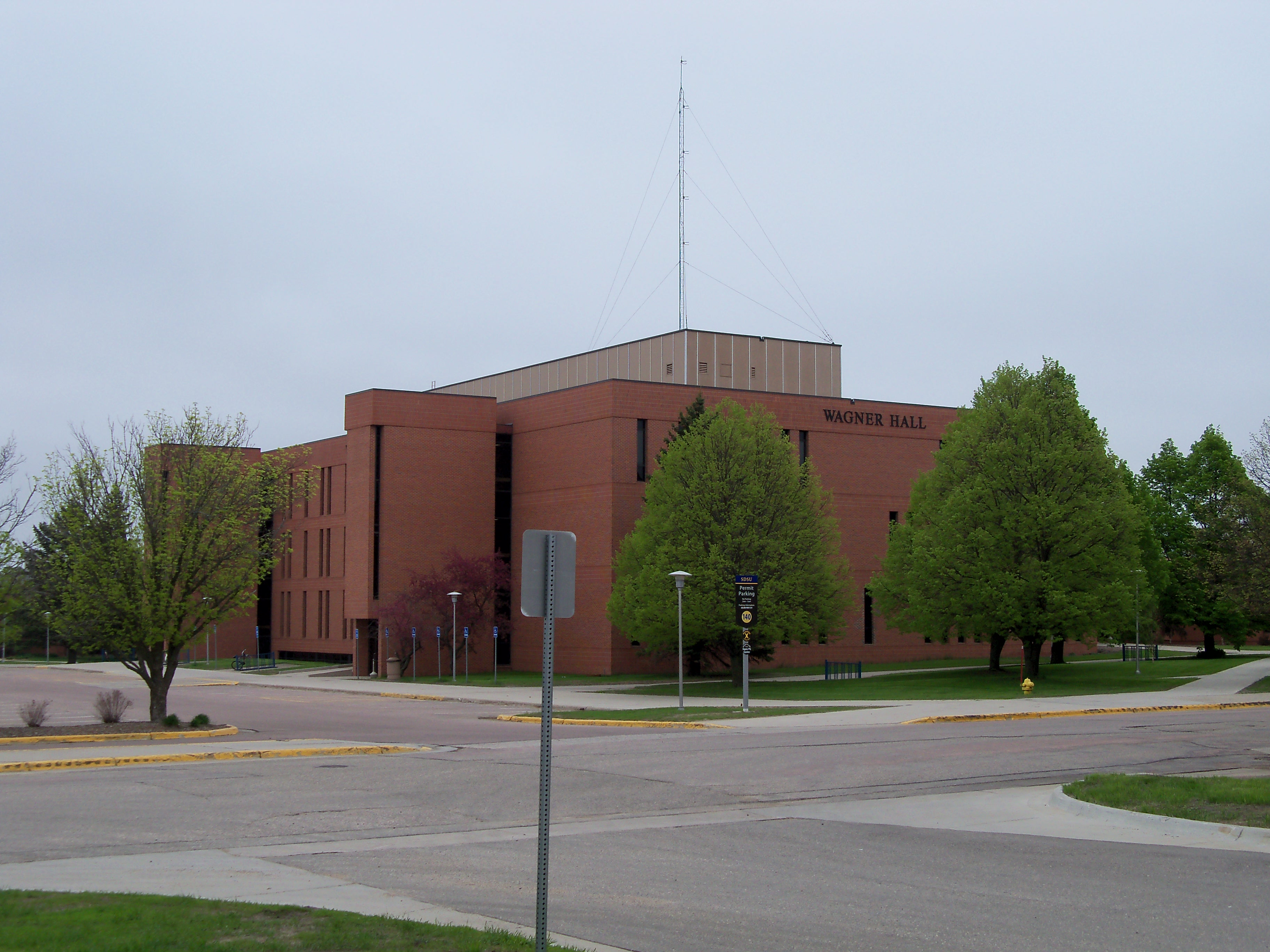
Wagner Hall

In 2010, South Dakota State renamed a major campus building in honor of Wagner and his spouse, former State Senator Mary Mumford Wagner (1932–2004).
