= Roger Haugo =

American lawyer and politician

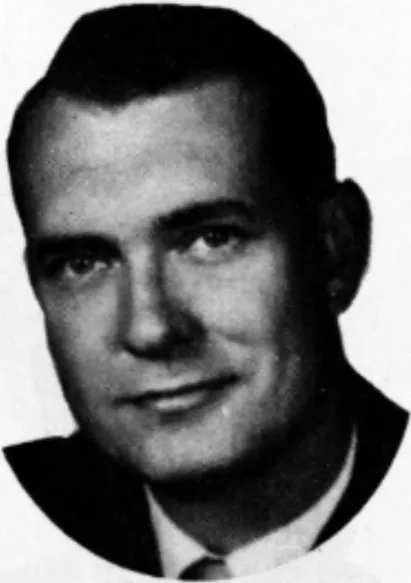
- Haugo in 1971

Member of the South Dakota House of Representatives
- In office 1971–1972

Personal details
- Born: October 11, 1933 (age 92)
- Party: Republican
- Education: Augustana University; University of South Dakota
- Occupation: Lawyer

Roger Haugo (born October 11, 1933) is an American lawyer and politician. He served as a Republican member of the South Dakota House of Representatives.

== Life and career ==
Haugo attended Augustana University and the University of South Dakota. He served in the United States Navy.

Haugo was director of Valley National Bank.

In 1971, Haugo was appointed to the South Dakota House of Representatives, following the resignation of David Billion.
