= Barney A. Boos =

American politician (1909–2005)

Member of the South Dakota House of Representatives
- In office 1953–1954

Personal details
- Born: August 22, 1909 Fulda, Minnesota, U.S.
- Died: August 29, 2005 (aged 96)
- Party: Republican
- Education: Augustana College

Barney A. Boos (August 22, 1909 – August 29, 2005) was an American politician. He served as a Republican member of the South Dakota House of Representatives.

== Life and career ==
Boos was born in Fulda, Minnesota. He attended Augustana College. He served as sheriff of Minnehaha County, South Dakota, and in the South Dakota House of Representatives, from 1953 to 1954.

Boos died on August 29, 2005, at the age of 96.
