= Wayne Sheley =

American gridiron football player (1916–1989)

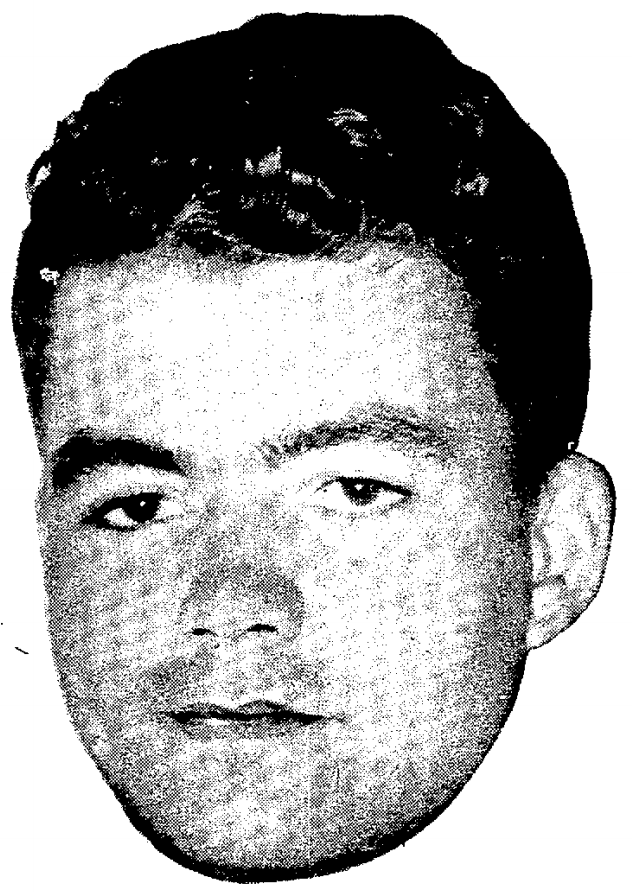
- Sheley pictured in the Winnipeg Free Press, August 26, 1939

Profile
- Position: Quarterback

Personal information
- Born: May 5, 1916; Lone Tree Township, Clay County, Iowa, U.S.
- Died: August 9, 1989 (aged 73); Douglas County, Minnesota, U.S.
- Listed height: 6 ft 1 in (1.85 m)

Career information
- College: Augustana (South Dakota)

Career history
- 1938–1942: Winnipeg Blue Bombers

Awards and highlights
- 2× Grey Cup champion (1939, 1941)

Edward Wayne Sheley (May 5, 1916 – August 9, 1989) was an American professional football player who played for the Winnipeg Blue Bombers. He won the Grey Cup with them in 1939 and 1941. He attended Augustana College in South Dakota, and was inducted into their athletics hall of fame in 1970.
