= David J. Strom =

American politician (1943–2007)

Member of the South Dakota House of Representatives
- In office 1979–1984

Personal details
- Born: November 13, 1943 Madison, South Dakota, U.S.
- Died: November 27, 2007 (aged 64)
- Party: Democratic
- Education: Augustana College; University of South Dakota

David J. Strom (November 13, 1943 – November 27, 2007) was an American politician. He served as a Democratic member of the South Dakota House of Representatives.

== Life and career ==
Strom was born in Madison, South Dakota. He attended Augustana College and the University of South Dakota.

Strom served in the South Dakota House of Representatives from 1979 to 1984.

Strom died on November 27, 2007, at the age of 64.
