= Gordon Iseminger =

American author and historian

Gordon L. Iseminger is an American author and historian. A professor of history at the University of North Dakota, he was the university's longest-serving faculty member, having joined the faculty in 1962. He retired in 2019. His work has appeared in the North Dakota Quarterly, Minnesota History, Agricultural History, Pennsylvania History, The Journal of American History, and the Middle East Journal, as well as the Encyclopedia of the Great Plains.

Iseminger is a graduate of Augustana College, the University of South Dakota, and the University of Oklahoma. He has served on the Grand Forks Historic Preservation Commission and was named a Chester Fritz Distinguished Professor in 2003.

== Biography ==
- A History of American-Canadian Commercial Reciprocity, 1854-1936 (1960)
- Britain's Eastern Policy and the Ottoman Christians, 1856-1877 (1965)
- The Americanization of Christina Hillius: German-Russian Emigrant to North Dakota (1986)
- The Quartzite Border: Surveying and Marking the North Dakota-South Dakota Boundary, 1891-1892 (1988)
