= 2016 NCAA Division II men's basketball tournament =

- Teams: 64
- Finals site: Dr. Pepper Arena, Frisco, Texas
- Champions: Augustana Vikings (1st title)
- Runner-up: Lincoln Memorial Railsplitters (1st title game)
- Semifinalists: West Liberty Hilltoppers (4th Final Four); Western Oregon Wolves (1st Final Four)
- Winning coach: Tom Billeter (1st title)
- MOP: Alex Richter (Augustana, SD)
- Attendance: TBD

The 2016 NCAA Division II men's basketball tournament involved 64 teams playing in a single-elimination tournament to determine the national champion of men's NCAA Division II college basketball. It began in March 2016, following the 2015–16 season, and concluded with the championship game on March 26, 2016.

The eight regional winners met in the Elite Eight for the quarterfinal, semifinal, and championship rounds. For the first time, the final rounds were held at Dr. Pepper Arena in Frisco, Texas.

Augustana (SD) defeated Lincoln Memorial, 90-81, to win the first national championship in the school's history. Lubbock Christian, Saginaw Valley State and St. Thomas Aquinas all made their first Division II tournament appearance. All won their first tournament game, and Saginaw Valley advanced to the Elite Eight. At the same time, Kentucky Wesleyan made its 38th appearance, Philadelphia its 35th, and Seattle Pacific its 26th, but all lost their opening round game.

2016 NCAA Division II Men's sites - regionals (cyan) Elite Eight (red)

== Regionals ==
=== Southeast - Harrogate, Tennessee ===
Location: Tex Turner Arena Host: Lincoln Memorial University

First round Round of 64; March 12
1	Lincoln Memorial (29–2)	98
8	Lander (22–9)	71
4	Queens (NC) (24–6)	94
5	Columbus State (21–7)	84
2	King (25–6)	79
7	Lenoir–Rhyne (19–9)	83
3	Wingate (22–9)	89
6	Montevallo (19–9)	88

Regional semifinal Round of 32; March 13
1	Lincoln Memorial	95
4	Queens (NC)	67
7	Lenoir–Rhyne	76
3	Wingate	69

Regional Final; Sweet 16; March 15
1	Lincoln Memorial	103
7	Lenoir–Rhyne	80

=== South - Huntsville, Alabama ===
Location: Spragins Hall Host: University of Alabama in Huntsville

First round Round of 64; March 12
1	Alabama–Huntsville (23–7)	98
8	Saint Leo (19–11)	81
4	West Georgia (22–8)	79
5	Stillman (26–5)	85
2	Eckerd (25–6)	85
7	Union (TN) (20–10)	88
3	Barry (23–6)	107
6	Rollins (21–8)	92

Regional semifinal Round of 32; March 13
1	Alabama–Huntsville	81
5	Stillman	71
7	Union (TN)	65
3	Barry	74

Regional Final; Sweet 16; March 15
1	Alabama–Huntsville	83
3	Barry	87

=== Atlantic - Wheeling, West Virginia ===
Location: Alma Grace McDonough Center Host: Wheeling Jesuit University

First round Round of 64; March 12
1	Wheeling Jesuit (28–3)	65
8	Mercyhurst (21–8)	66
4	Kutztown (23–6)	76
5	West Chester (21–6)	63
2	West Liberty (27–3)	90
7	Concord (22–9)	69
3	Fairmont State (25–4)	66
6	Virginia State (23–5)	76

Regional semifinal Round of 32; March 13
8	Mercyhurst	73
4	Kutztown	79
2	West Liberty	90
6	Virginia State	69

Regional Final; Sweet 16; March 15
4	Kutztown	64
2	West Liberty	85

=== East - Philadelphia, Pennsylvania ===
Location: Campus Center Gymnasium Host: Holy Family University

First round Round of 64; March 12
1	Holy Family (26–5)	80
8	Southern New Hampshire (22–10)	88
4	Stonehill (21–8)	78
5	Bentley (21–8)	62
2	Saint Anselm (21–7)	83
7	Philadelphia (23–8)	71
3	Southern Connecticut (22–7)	90
6	St. Thomas Aquinas (26–4)	92

Regional semifinal Round of 32; March 13
8	Southern New Hampshire	74
4	Stonehill	75
2	Saint Anselm	77
6	St. Thomas Aquinas	73

Regional Final; Sweet 16; March 15
4	Stonehill	82
2	Saint Anselm	76

=== Central - Sioux Falls, South Dakota ===
Location: Sanford Pentagon Host: Augustana University

First round Round of 64; March 12
1	Augustana (SD) (28–2)	100
8	Harding (20–10)	85
4	Nebraska–Kearney (20–11)	79
5	Fort Hays State (20–10)	67
2	Northwest Missouri State (25–5)	78
7	Ouachita Baptist (19–12)	53
3	Minnesota State–Moorhead (30–5)	81
6	Minnesota State–Mankato (21–9)	85

Regional semifinal Round of 32; March 13
1	Augustana (SD)	77
4	Nebraska–Kearney	67
2	Northwest Missouri State	82
6	Minnesota State–Mankato	60

Regional Final; Sweet 16; March 15
1	Augustana (SD)	80
2	Northwest Missouri State	78

=== South Central - Wichita Falls, Texas ===
Location: D.L. Ligon Coliseum Host: Midwestern State University

First round Round of 64; March 12
1	Midwestern State (24–5)	73
8	Lubbock Christian (20–9)	79
4	Tarleton State (21–8)	83
5	Colorado Mines (24–7)	61
2	Fort Lewis (27–3)	95
7	Dallas Baptist (23–8)	87
3	Angelo State (23–6)	92
6	Arkansas–Fort Smith (23–8)	85

Regional semifinal Round of 32; March 13
8	Lubbock Christian	63
4	Tarleton State	69
2	Fort Lewis	66
3	Angelo State	87

Regional Final; Sweet 16; March 15
4	Tarleton State	77
3	Angelo State	72

=== West - Monmouth, Oregon ===
Location: New P.E. Building Host: Western Oregon University

First round Round of 64; March 11
1	Western Oregon (27–3)	82
8	Humboldt State (21–8)	65
4	Seattle Pacific (22–8)	66
5	Azusa Pacific (22–8)	77
2	UC San Diego (22–7)	76
7	Chico State (22–6)	64
3	California Baptist (27–6)	70
6	Cal Poly Pomona (22–7)	63

Regional semifinal Round of 32; March 12
1	Western Oregon	81
5	Azusa Pacific	69
2	UC San Diego	71
3	California Baptist	69

Regional Final; Sweet 16; March 14
1	Western Oregon	60
2	UC San Diego	55

=== Midwest - Somers, Wisconsin ===
Location: DeSimone Gymnasium Host: University of Wisconsin, Parkside

First round Round of 64; March 12
1	Wisconsin–Parkside (24–5)	74
8	Kentucky Wesleyan (27–3)	65
4	Lewis (24–8)	65
5	Saginaw Valley (22–7)	80
2	Bellarmine (23–6)	84
7	Ferris State (22–9)	100
3	Ashland (25–5)	60
6	Indianapolis (20–7)	77

Regional semifinal Round of 32; March 13
1	Wisconsin–Parkside	77
5	Saginaw Valley	92
7	Ferris State	89
6	Indianapolis	87

Regional Final; Sweet 16; March 15
5	Saginaw Valley	63
7	Ferris State	61

== Elite Eight - Frisco, Texas ==
Location: Dr Pepper Arena Host: Lone Star Conference

Beginning this year, the eight regional champions were re-seeded into the Elite Eight.

National Quarterfinals; Elite Eight; Wednesday, March 23
1	Lincoln Memorial	93
8	Barry	75
4	West Liberty	75
5	Stonehill	74
2	Augustana (SD)	86
7	Tarleton State	79
3	Western Oregon	81
6	Saginaw Valley	68

National semifinals Final Four; Thursday, March 24
1	Lincoln Memorial	103
4	West Liberty	102
2	Augustana (SD)	74
3	Western Oregon	55

National championship Saturday, March 26
1	Lincoln Memorial	81
2	Augustana (SD)	90

== All-tournament team ==
- Seger Bonifant (West Liberty)
- Daniel Jansen (Augustana (SD))
- Alex Richter (Augustana (SD))
- Casey Schilling (Augustana (SD))
- Gerel Simmons (Lincoln Memorial)
