= Ola Ordal =

Ola J. Ordal (August 2, 1870 – December 27, 1936) was an American teacher, pastor, and the fifth president of Pacific Lutheran College.

Ordal received his education in the grammar schools of South Dakota and later attended the Lutheran Normal School at Sioux Falls, South Dakota. He then taught in the public school of Story County, Iowa.

He received his A.B. degree from Luther College in 1898. Three years later, he completed his studies at Luther Seminary, Saint Paul, Minnesota. His first pastorate was at New Whatcom, and currently at Bellingham, Washington. Then, he moved again to Red Wing Minnesota.

Prior to becoming president at Pacific Lutheran College (PLC), he served as pastor of Our Saviours’ Lutheran Church in Tacoma. He was actively connected with school work in the greater part of his ministry. He was a member of the board of trustees for the Ladies’ Seminary at Red Wing, Minnesota; a longtime member of the board of trustees at Pacific Lutheran Academy in Parkland and later a member of the board of trustees for Pacific Lutheran College. For three years, he was the president of the National Association of Young People's Societies in the former Norwegian Synod of the American Evangelical Lutheran Church.

During president Ordal's tenure at PLC, collegiate status was achieved by the school and an elaborate committee system was established—with nine committees and ten full-time faculty members. A system of rules governing appointments, salaries and promotions were also established and the Normal department was accredited by the state.

The first endowment drive was launched during Ordal's time with a goal of raising $250,000 which was reached by year 1927.

With the successful endowment drive behind him, collegiate status achieved, and normal department accreditation, Ola. J. Ordal resigned in January 1928 and accepted the call to pastor Our Saviour's Lutheran Church in Bellingham, Washington.

Ordal Hall was built in 1967 and named to honor the fifth president of Pacific Lutheran University.
