= KAUR =

Sioux Falls, South Dakota; United States
- Frequency: 89.1 MHz
- Branding: Minnesota Public Radio News

Programming
- Format: News/Talk (Public)

Ownership
- Owner: Augustana University
- Operator: Minnesota Public Radio

History
- Call sign meaning: AUgustana College Radio

Technical information
- Facility ID: 3239
- Class: A
- ERP: 680 watts
- HAAT: 56.0 meters
- Transmitter coordinates: 43°31′37″N 96°44′18″W

Links
- Webcast: Stream
- Website: www.mprnews.org

KAUR (89.1 FM) is a radio station broadcasting programming from Minnesota Public Radio's News & Information service. Licensed to Augustana University in Sioux Falls, South Dakota, United States, the station serves the greater Sioux Falls area and can reliably broadcast up to approximately 30 miles in any direction. The station is currently owned by Augustana University and operated by MPR. All programming originates from the Twin Cities, but the station has inserts at least once an hour for local underwriting and weather. MPR also maintains a small office space on the Augustana campus.

== History ==
Up until 2009, KAUR specialized in independent or college rock and also broadcast regular Alternative, Blues/Jazz, Folk, Spanish Traditional, Hip-Hop, and Hardcore/Metal shows. KAUR was founded in 1972 and Augustana University also once managed a self-constructed AM station, which, itself, was founded in 1945.

By 2009, KAUR had begun to experience a number of problems. Amongst the most troublesome of KAUR's woes was a major staffing issue. Owing to a lack of official support, and a decrease in student interest in traditional media, KAUR spent its last year as a student-run station under the direction of only six students during the first semester and five throughout the second, spring semester. Although understaffed, the station continued to develop new ideas for operating in the "new media" era. Plans had been made to begin streaming the station over the internet or to regularly "podcast" student shows by offering down-loadable content on the, now inaccessible, student website. Other plans in development early in the spring of 2009 included adding broadcasts of the Augustana University men's baseball team to the station's sports programming which already featured women's basketball.

In the spring of 2009, administrators at Augustana University decided to discontinue KAUR's student operations in favor of outsourcing the station's operations to MPR (in lieu of alternative suggestions). The station left the air for a week before returning on September 15, 2009 as part of MPR's all-news network. Augustana University continues to own the station while MPR provides programming, maintenance, and funding for the regular operation of the station. The students assigned to operate KAUR for the 2009-2010 academic year, as part of the federal work-study program, were forcibly reassigned to other departments. The college had also received proposals from a number of other parties, including religious and ethnic interests, as well as a non-profit proposal which would have continued the student-run scheme.
