= Box Elder, South Dakota =

Box Elder, South Dakota čhaŋšúška
- City
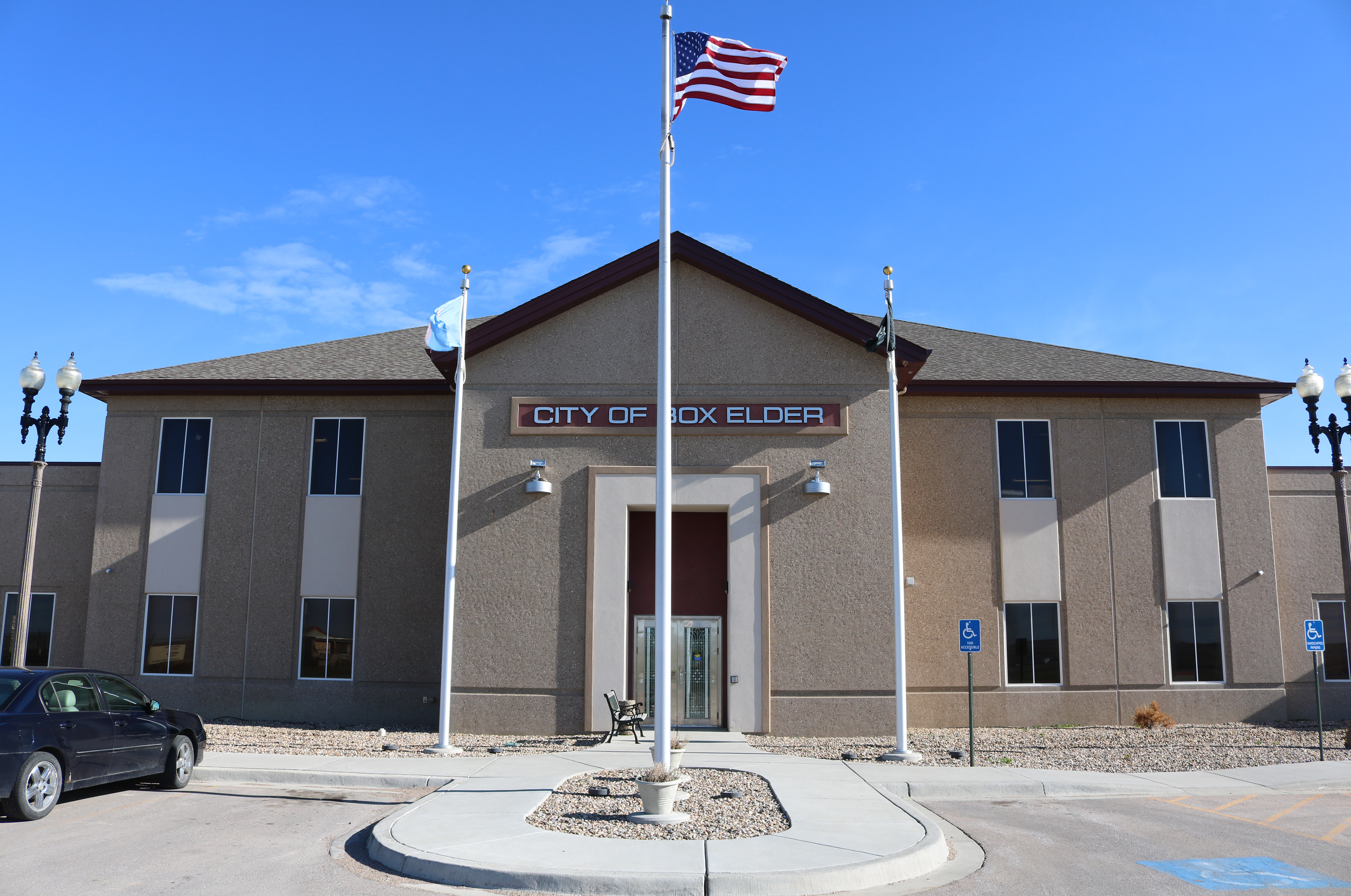
- Box Elder City Hall
- Nickname: Gateway to the Black Hills
- Location of Box Elder, South Dakota
- Coordinates: 44.110941°N 103.081066°W
- Country: United States
- State: South Dakota
- Counties: Pennington, Meade
- Founded: 1907
- Incorporated: May 12, 1965

Government
  - Mayor: Larry Larson
  - Alderman: Kirk Beauchamp; John Talich; Patrick Schubert, Sr. Steven Bixel
  - President: Michael Knight; Rick Davis

Area
  - City: 14.858 sq mi (38.482 km^{2})
  - Land: 14.834 sq mi (38.420 km^{2})
  - Water: 0.024 sq mi (0.061 km^{2}) 0.16%
- Elevation: 3,045 ft (928 m)

Population (2020)
  - City: 11,746
  - Estimate (2024): 13,887
  - Density: 936.0/sq mi (361.39/km^{2})
  - Urban: 11,386
  - Metro: 156,227 (US: 280th)
  - Combined: 185,036 (US: 149th)
- Time zone: UTC–7 (Mountain (MST))
  - Summer (DST): UTC–6 (MDT)
- ZIP Code: 57719
- Area code: 605
- FIPS code: 46-06620
- GNIS feature ID: 1267290
- Sales tax: 6.2%
- Website: www.boxeldersd.gov

Box Elder (Lakota: čhaŋšúška; "box elder maple") is a city in Pennington and Meade Counties, South Dakota, United States. The population was 11,746 at the 2020 census, and was estimated to be 13,887 in 2024, making it the ninth-most populous city in South Dakota. Ellsworth Air Force Base lies on the northwest side of the city, and it is a suburb of Rapid City.

Box Elder was named from nearby Boxelder Creek.

== Geography ==
According to the United States Census Bureau, the city has a total area of 14.858 square miles (38.48 km^{2}), of which 14.834 square miles (38.42 km^{2}) is land and 0.024 square miles (0.06 km^{2}) (0.16%) is water.

Box Elder is located near Ellsworth Air Force Base which surrounds it on three sides.

=== Climate ===
Climate data for Rapid City, South Dakota (Rapid City Regional Airport), 1981−2010 normals
| Month | Jan | Feb | Mar | Apr | May | Jun | Jul | Aug | Sep | Oct | Nov | Dec | Year |
|---|---|---|---|---|---|---|---|---|---|---|---|---|---|
| Record high °F (°C) | 76 (24) | 75 (24) | 83 (28) | 93 (34) | 98 (37) | 109 (43) | 111 (44) | 107 (42) | 104 (40) | 94 (34) | 83 (28) | 75 (24) | 111 (44) |
| Mean daily maximum °F (°C) | 37 (3) | 40 (4) | 48 (9) | 58 (14) | 68 (20) | 78 (26) | 87 (31) | 86 (30) | 76 (24) | 61 (16) | 47 (8) | 37 (3) | 60 (16) |
| Mean daily minimum °F (°C) | 13 (−11) | 15 (−9) | 23 (−5) | 32 (0) | 42 (6) | 51 (11) | 58 (14) | 57 (14) | 46 (8) | 34 (1) | 22 (−6) | 13 (−11) | 34 (1) |
| Record low °F (°C) | −27 (−33) | −31 (−35) | −21 (−29) | 1 (−17) | 18 (−8) | 31 (−1) | 39 (4) | 38 (3) | 18 (−8) | −2 (−19) | −19 (−28) | −30 (−34) | −31 (−35) |
| Average precipitation inches (mm) | 0.30 (7.6) | 0.46 (12) | 0.93 (24) | 1.80 (46) | 3.22 (82) | 2.53 (64) | 1.85 (47) | 1.56 (40) | 1.29 (33) | 1.42 (36) | 0.53 (13) | 0.42 (11) | 16.31 (415.6) |
Source: The Weather Channel (Historical Monthly Averages)

== Demographics ==
Historical population
| Census | Pop. | Note | %± |
|---|---|---|---|
| 1970 | 607 | | — |
| 1980 | 3,186 | | 424.9% |
| 1990 | 2,680 | | −15.9% |
| 2000 | 2,841 | | 6.0% |
| 2010 | 7,800 | | 174.6% |
| 2020 | 11,746 | | 50.6% |
| 2024 (est.) | 13,887 | | 18.2% |
U.S. Decennial Census; 2020 Census

As of the 2023 American Community Survey, there are 4,311 estimated households in Box Elder with an average of 2.82 persons per household. The city has a median household income of $73,698. Approximately 7.4% of the city's population lives at or below the poverty line. Box Elder has an estimated 65.8% employment rate, with 29.8% of the population holding a bachelor's degree or higher and 94.2% holding a high school diploma.

The top five reported ancestries (people were allowed to report up to two ancestries, thus the figures will generally add to more than 100%) were English (97.0%), Spanish (1.1%), Indo-European (0.4%), Asian and Pacific Islander (1.0%), and Other (0.5%).

=== Racial and ethnic composition ===
Box Elder, South Dakota – racial and ethnic composition Note: the US Census treats Hispanic/Latino as an ethnic category. This table excludes Latinos from the racial categories and assigns them to a separate category. Hispanics/Latinos may be of any race.
| Race / ethnicity (NH = non-Hispanic) | Pop. 2000 | Pop. 2010 | Pop. 2020 | % 2000 | % 2010 | % 2020 |
|---|---|---|---|---|---|---|
| White alone (NH) | 2,327 | 5,901 | 8,646 | 81.91% | 75.65% | 73.6% |
| Black or African American alone (NH) | 62 | 382 | 425 | 2.18% | 4.90% | 3.6% |
| Native American or Alaska Native alone (NH) | 148 | 311 | 868 | 5.21% | 3.99% | 7.4% |
| Asian alone (NH) | 55 | 167 | 223 | 1.94% | 2.14% | 1.9% |
| Pacific Islander alone (NH) | 3 | 29 | 41 | 0.11% | 0.37% | 0.3% |
| Other race alone (NH) | 0 | 13 | 248 | 0.00% | 0.17% | 2.1% |
| Mixed race or multiracial (NH) | 145 | 377 | 1,295 | 5.10% | 4.83% | 11.0% |
| Hispanic or Latino (any race) | 101 | 620 | 908 | 3.56% | 7.95% | 7.7% |
| Total | 2,841 | 7,800 | 11,746 | 100.00% | 100.00% | 100.00% |

=== 2020 census ===
As of the 2020 census, there were 11,746 people, 4,123 households, and 2,992 families residing in the city. The population density was 809.73 inhabitants per square mile (312.6/km^{2}). There were 4,373 housing units at an average density of 301.38 per square mile (116.4/km^{2}).

As of the 2020 census, the median age was 27.8 years. 29.9% of residents were under the age of 18 and 8.1% of residents were 65 years of age or older. For every 100 females there were 107.6 males, and for every 100 females age 18 and over there were 108.3 males.

As of the 2020 census, there were 4,123 households in Box Elder, of which 42.3% had children under the age of 18 living in them. Of all households, 56.5% were married-couple households, 17.3% were households with a male householder and no spouse or partner present, and 17.6% were households with a female householder and no spouse or partner present. About 20.1% of all households were made up of individuals and 4.7% had someone living alone who was 65 years of age or older. There were 4,373 housing units, of which 5.7% were vacant. The homeowner vacancy rate was 2.2% and the rental vacancy rate was 5.5%.

As of the 2020 census, 90.6% of residents lived in urban areas, while 9.4% lived in rural areas.

=== 2010 census ===
As of the 2010 census, there were 7,800 people, 2,443 households, and 1,968 families residing in the city. The population density was 561.15 inhabitants per square mile (216.7/km^{2}). There were 2,828 housing units at an average density of 203.45 per square mile (78.6/km^{2}). The racial makeup of the city was 79.51% White, 5.10% African American, 4.45% Native American, 2.19% Asian, 0.37% Pacific Islander, 2.36% from some other races and 6.01% from two or more races. Hispanic or Latino people of any race were 7.95% of the population.

There were 2,443 households, 55.2% had children under the age of 18 living with them, 60.6% were married couples living together, 14.1% had a female householder with no husband present, 5.8% had a male householder with no wife present, and 19.4% were non-families. 15.1% of households were one person, and 2% were one person aged 65 or older. The average household size was 2.95 and the average family size was 3.26.

The median age was 23.5 years. 33.6% of residents were under the age of 18; 20.4% were between the ages of 18 and 24; 30.3% were from 25 to 44; 13% were from 45 to 64, and 2.9% were 65 or older. The gender makeup of the city was 51.9% male and 48.1% female.

=== 2000 census ===
As of the 2000 census, there were 2,841 people, 993 households, and 750 families residing in the city. The population density was 489.6 inhabitants per square mile (189.0/km^{2}). There were 1,072 housing units at an average density of 184.8 per square mile (71.4/km^{2}). The racial makeup of the city was 83.42% White, 2.29% African American, 5.60% Native American, 2.08% Asian, 0.11% Pacific Islander, 0.70% from some other races and 5.81% from two or more races. Hispanic or Latino people of any race were 3.56% of the population.

There were 993 households, 48.0% had children under the age of 18 living with them, 50.4% were married couples living together, 19.6% had a female householder with no husband present, and 24.4% were non-families. 17.3% of households were one person, and 1.8% were one person aged 65 or older. The average household size was 2.86 and the average family size was 3.20.

The age distribution was 34.6% under the age of 18, 13.1% from 18 to 24, 30.9% from 25 to 44, 18.2% from 45 to 64, and 3.3% 65 or older. The median age was 26 years. For every 100 females, there were 98.9 males. For every 100 females age 18 and over, there were 95.7 males.

== Education ==
Douglas School District 51-1 serves families in most portions of Box Elder, and those living on Ellsworth AFB. The school district operates six schools in Box Elder:

- Carrousel (Pre-Kindergarten)
- Badger Clark Elementary (Kindergarten - 3rd grade)
- Francis Case Elementary (Kindergarten - 3rd grade)
- Vandenberg Elementary (4th - 5th grade)
- Douglas Middle School (6th - 8th grade)
- Douglas High School (9th - 12th grade)

The school's athletics teams are the Douglas Patriots.

A portion of Box Elder is in Rapid City School District 51-4.

Box Elder is home to the Rapid City satellite campuses of Black Hills State University and the South Dakota State University College of Nursing.

== Points of interest ==
- South Dakota Air and Space Museum

== Notable people ==
- Jeffrey W. Hayzlett, author, speaker, businessman
- Nellie Zabel Willhite, first deaf woman to earn a pilot's license
