= David Amland =

American painter and art educator

- Born: February 8, 1931; Iowa City, Iowa, U.S.
- Died: February 28, 2010 (aged 79); Dallas, Texas, U.S.
- Education: Augustana University; University of Iowa
- Occupation: Painter

David Amland (February 8, 1931 - February 28, 2010) was an American painter and art educator. He was a professor at Midland University in Nebraska, and later joined the art colony in Carmel, California. He retired in Texas. His work can be seen at the Museum of Nebraska Art.
