= Kirkeby–Over Stadium =

Football stadium in Sioux Falls, South Dakota

Coordinates: 43.5195516°N 96.7434168°W

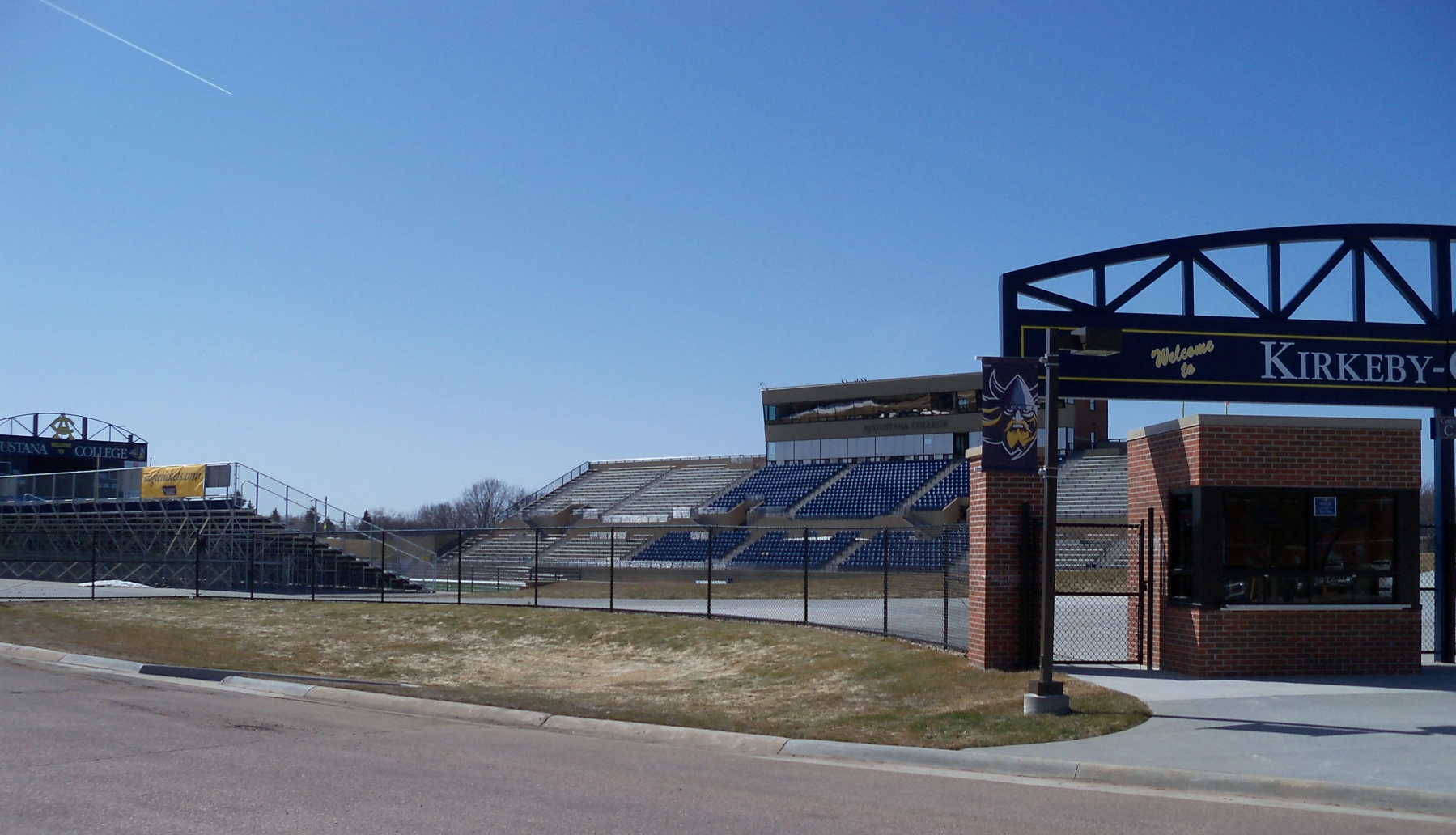
Kirkeby-Over Stadium

Kirkeby–Over Stadium is the football stadium of the Augustana University Vikings in Sioux Falls, South Dakota. It is located on the Augustana campus. The stadium opened in 2009 and replaced Howard Wood Field as the home field for the football team. The stadium seats approximately 6,500, including 2,200 chairback seats, and has a FieldTurf surface in a bowl venue. Luxury suites, a spacious press box and private media booths are featured on the west side of the stadium. The facility also boasts high definition television monitors in each suite and plenty of connection options for use by media. Fans are also able to watch the action from grass berms in the end zones. In 2021, the original FieldTurf was torn out and replaced with brand new turf.

Construction of Kirkeby–Over Stadium began in October 2007 on the site of the Vikings’ practice field at 37th Street and Lake Avenue on campus. The completion gave the Vikings an on-campus facility for the first time in half a century. Kari and Bob Hall, who both attended Augustana, donated $6.1 million towards the construction of the stadium. Bob Hall became the equipment manager for the football program. The name honors the memory of Kari Hall’s father and mother, Percy Kirkeby and Elizabeth Markley Kirkeby-Over. Percy Kirkeby graduated from Augustana in 1947 and was a veteran of World War II, serving with the Army Air Corps in Italy. He was killed in a plane crash in 1951. Elizabeth Markley Kirkeby-Over graduated from Augustana in 1944, and died in 1994.
