= South Dakota Air and Space Museum =

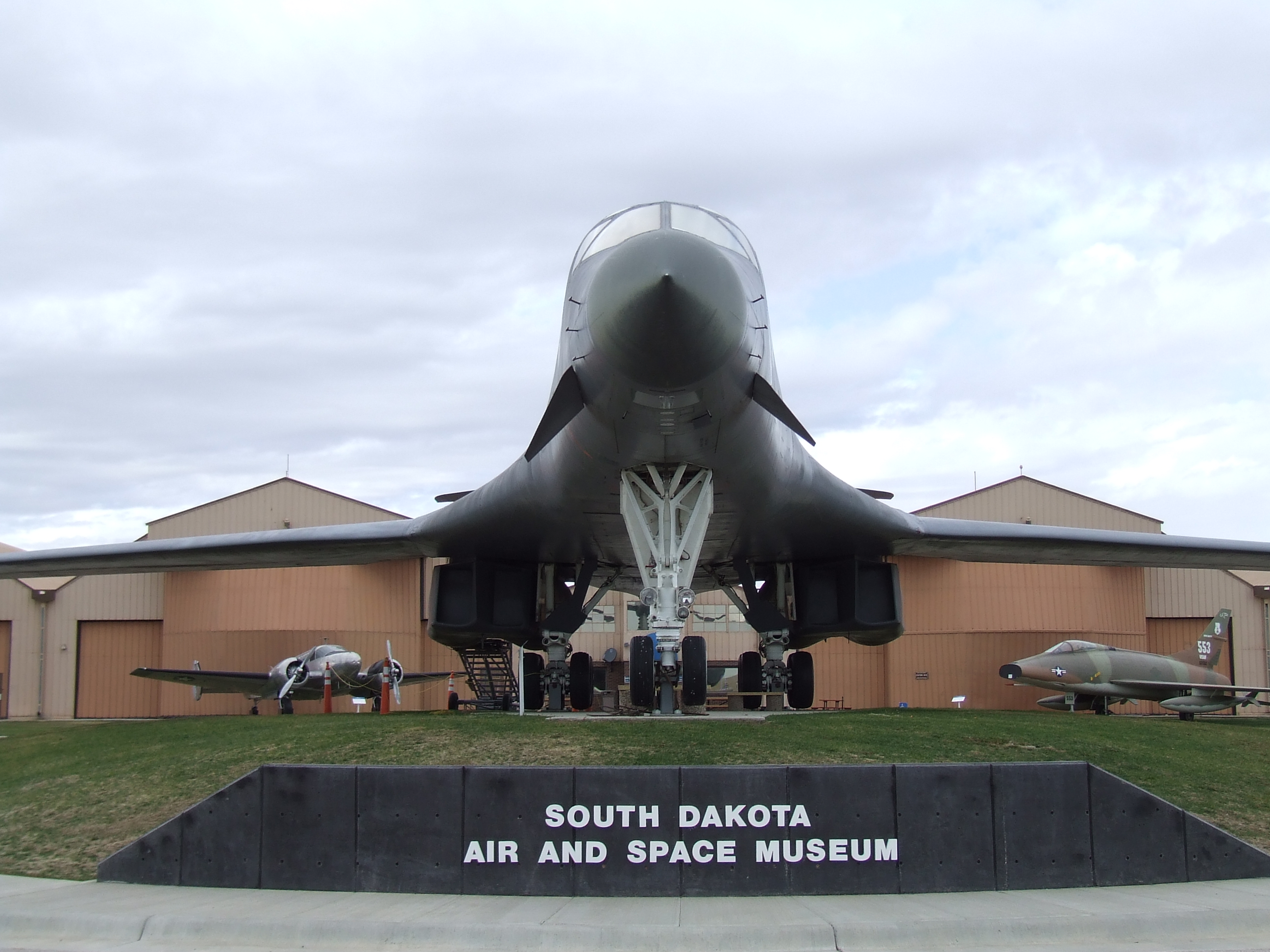

- Location within South Dakota
- Established: 1983
- Location: Adjacent to Ellsworth Air Force Base, Box Elder, South Dakota, United States
- Coordinates: 44°08′0.82″N 103°04′23.31″W
- Type: Aviation museum
- Collection size: 25+ aircraft
- Founder: Gerald E. Teachout
- Website: South Dakota Air & Space Museum

The South Dakota Air and Space Museum is an aviation museum located in Box Elder, South Dakota, just outside the main gate of Ellsworth Air Force Base. It is dedicated to the history of the United States Air Force, the base and aerospace in South Dakota.

== History ==
The Ellsworth Heritage Foundation was founded as a result of a United States Air Force program began in 1982 to establish museums at various bases around the country. The museum was co-founded by Gerald E. Teachout in 1983. Fundraising for a new building began in 1985, but the museum was given four former F-89 hangars and a two-story building that had been planned for demolition. The hangars and building were moved to the museum's current location near the base's main gate in 1992.

The museum received a mockup of a Northrop Grumman B-2 Spirit from the American Honda Motor Company in 1989. (Note: The mockup was scrapped in 2004.) The following year, it restored a Boeing B-29 Superfortress and received a Boeing B-47 Stratojet from Pease Air Force Base.

A Convair B-36 on display in Texas was originally planned to be added to the museum in 1992, but it was eventually transferred to another museum. In 1994, a Minuteman II missile silo trainer located on Ellsworth Air Force Base was added to the museum inventory. (Note: The site was transferred to the National Park Service in September 2002.)

The museum received a grant in 1998 to renovate its displays. In 2001, a new entrance with a Rockwell B-1 Lancer was dedicated. Following a restoration, an AGM-28 Hound Dog missile was unveiled in 2011. A two-year landscaping project was completed in 2016. In 2017 the museum dedicated a Titan I missile on display in the outdoor airpark. In 2019, the museum partnered with the Commemorative Air Force to fly a B-25 across the state to recognize the two South Dakotans who participated in the Doolittle Raid. A model of an AGM-158 missile was placed on display in 2022. The museum reopened in June 2024 after having been closed for two years.

== Exhibits ==
The museum has four interior galleries named for Frank Hunter, Duke Corning, Clyde Ice, and Joe Foss. Displays cover the history of aerospace technology, the World Wars, the Cold War, aviation pioneers, and the Ellsworth Air Force Base. A number of training aids, such as F-106 and B-1B cockpits, an F-16 simulator, and a Minuteman Crew Mission Procedures Trainer are on display. Other exhibits include Stratobowl Balloon Launches in the 1930s, 44th Bombardment Group/44th Strategic Missile Wing, and the South Dakota Aviation Hall of Fame.

== Collection ==
=== Aircraft on display ===
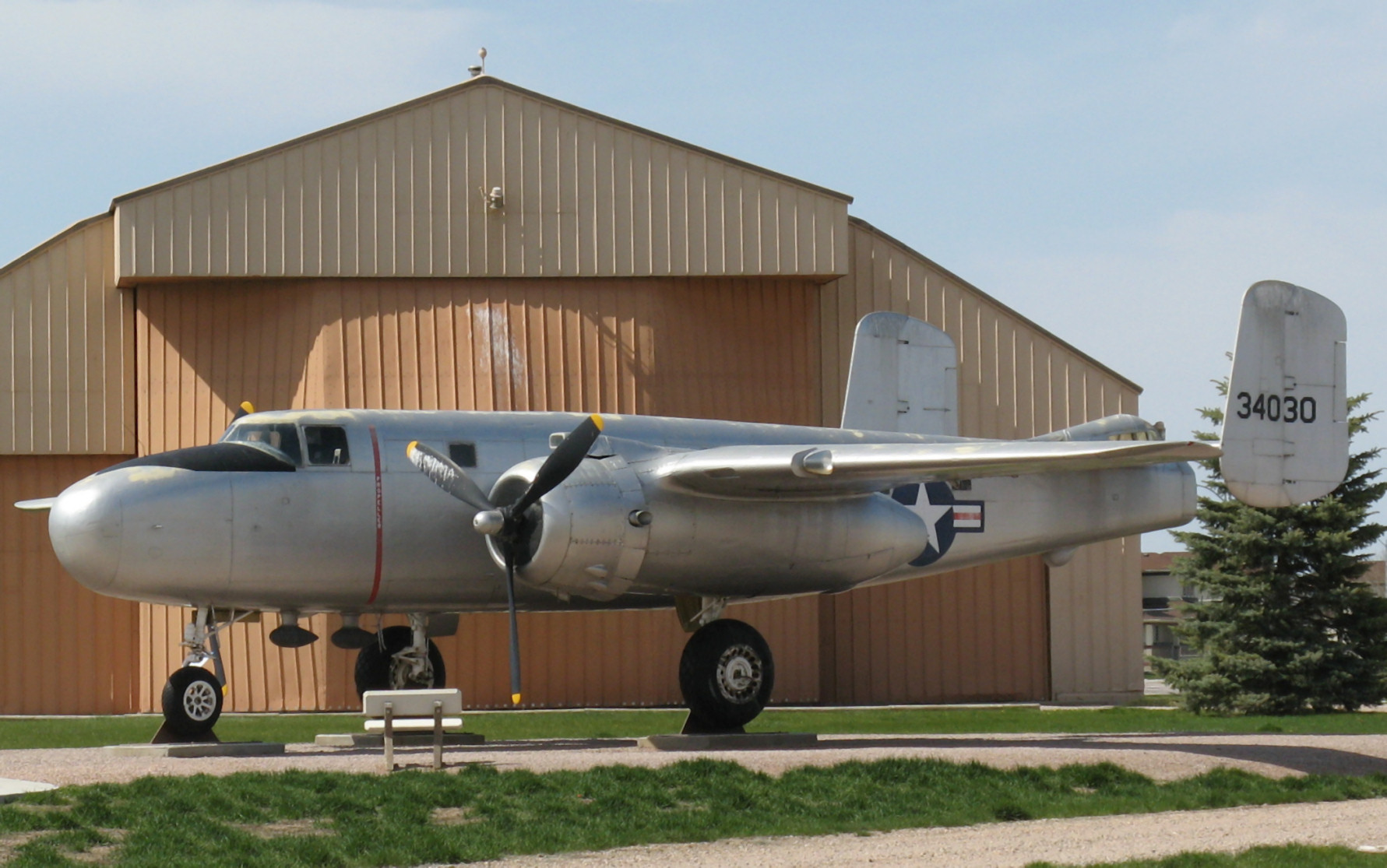
North American VB-25J Mitchell

- Beechcraft C-45H Expeditor 52-10866
- Beechcraft U-8D Seminole 56-3708
- Bell H-13 Sioux 58-1520
- Bell UH-1F Iroquois 65-7951
- Boeing B-29 Superfortress 44-87779
- Boeing B-52 Stratofortress 56-0657
- Boeing EC-135A 61-0262
- Cessna O-2A Skymaster 67-21422
- Cessna U-3A 53-5872
- Convair C-131D Samaritan 55-0292
- Convair F-102A Delta Dagger 56-1017
- Douglas A-26K Invader 64-17640
- Douglas C-47H Skytrain 42-93127
- Douglas C-54D Skymaster 42-72592
- General Dynamics FB-111A Aardvark 68-0248
- Lockheed T-33A 57-0590
- LTV A-7D Corsair II 74-1739
- Martin EB-57B Canberra 52-1548
- McDonnell F-101B Voodoo 59-0426
- North American F-100A Super Sabre 53-1533
- North American F-86H Sabre 53-1302
- North American VB-25J Mitchell 43-4030
- Rockwell B-1B Lancer 83-0067
- Northrop T-38 Talon 58-1192
- Republic F-105B Thunderchief 57-5839
- Republic F-84F Thunderjet 52-8886
- Stinson L-5G Sentinel 45-35046
- Vultee BT-13 Valiant 41-22204

=== Missiles on display ===
- AGM-28 Hound Dog 59-2791
- LGM-25C Titan I 61-4523
- LGM-30F Minuteman II
- MIM-3 Nike Ajax

== See also ==
- List of aerospace museums
- List of museums in South Dakota
- North American aviation halls of fame
