= Jeffrey W. Hayzlett =

American businessman

Jeffrey Hayzlett
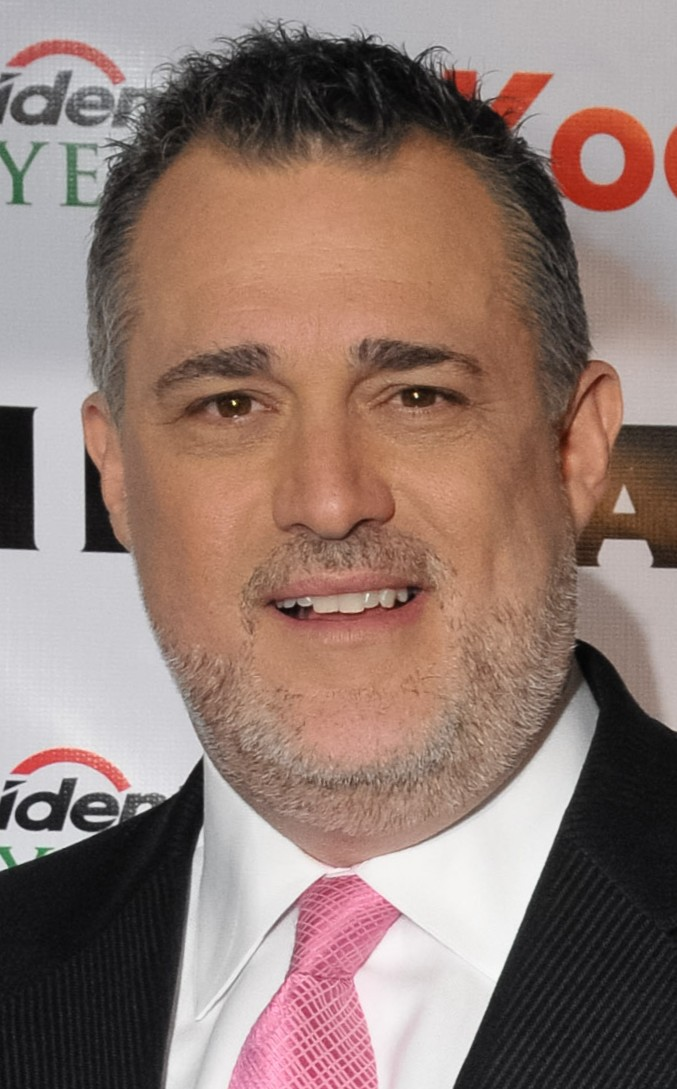
- Hayzlett in 2010
- Born: 1960 or 1961 (age 64–65); Charleston, West Virginia, U.S.
- Occupations: CEO, The Hayzlett Group
- Website: The Hayzlett Group

Jeffrey Hayzlett (born 1960/61) is an American businessman. He is the former chief marketing officer of the Eastman Kodak Company from 2006-2010. In 2014 he became the CEO of The Hayzlett Group.

== Early life ==
Hayzlett was born in Charleston, West Virginia, the oldest of three siblings. His father was in the military which caused his family to move frequently.

Hayzlett graduated from Douglas High School in Box Elder, South Dakota in 1979. He then studied government and international affairs at Augustana College, a private college in Sioux Falls. He was a member of Pi Sigma Epsilon.

== Career ==
Hayzlett joined Kodak in April 2006 as chief marketing officer and vice president of the company's Graphic Communications Group. Beginning in 2007, Hayzlett was a guest celebrity judge on NBC’s Celebrity Apprentice for three seasons. In 2008 he became the CEO of the Hayzlett Group, as well as the chairman of TallGrass Public Relations. In 2013 he became the co-founder and chairman of the C-Suite Network.

In May 2010, Jeff Hayzlett released a book entitled The Mirror Test: Is Your Business Really Breathing? In January 2012, Hayzlett released his second book, Running the Gauntlet: Essential Business Lessons to Lead, Drive Change, and Grow Profits. In September 2015, Hayzlett released his third book, “Think Big, Act Bigger: The Rewards of Being Relentless.”

In 2013, Hayzlett became a contributing editor for Bloomberg Television. Hayzlett has hosted C-Suite with Jeffrey Hayzlett and Executive Perspectives on C-Suite TV since 2015. Hayzlett has also hosted All Business with Jeffrey Hayzlett, a business podcast which airs on C-Suite Radio, since 2015.

== C-Suite with Jeffrey Hayzlett ==
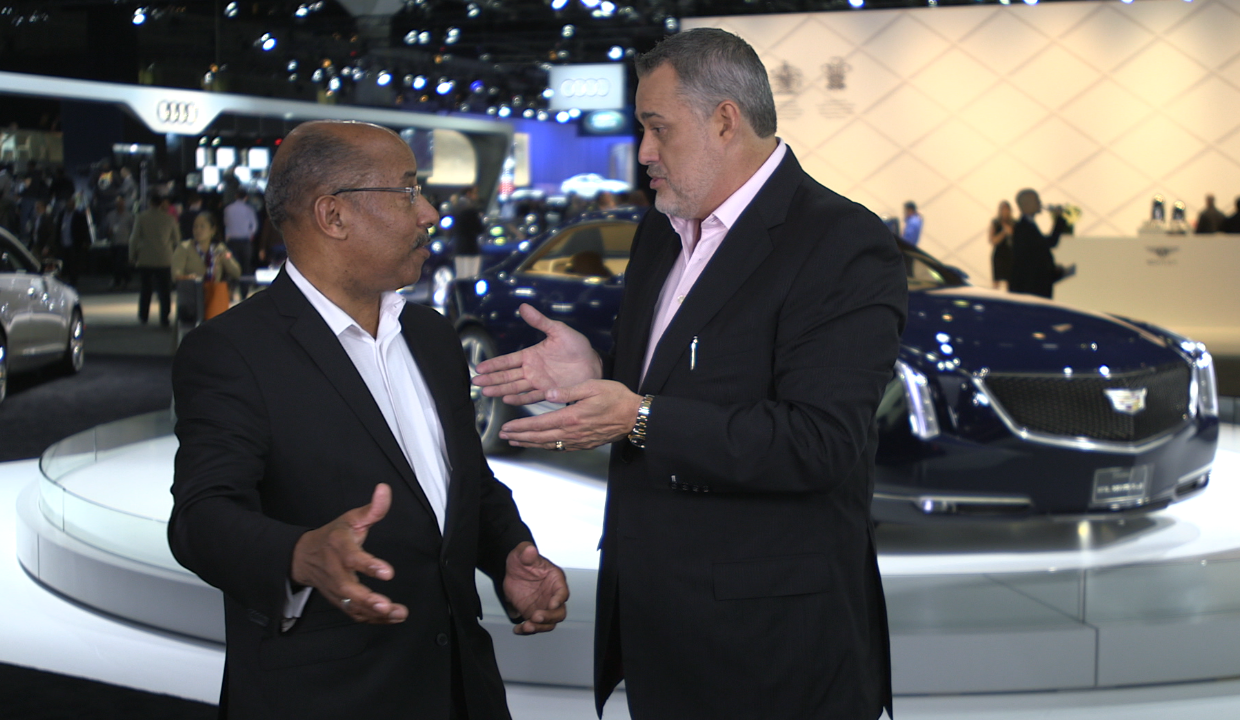
Jeffrey Hayzlett filming Cadillac at the LA Auto Show for his Bloomberg Television show "C-Suite with Jeffrey Hayzlett"

On September 3, 2013, Bloomberg announced Hayzlett's new role as the host of C-Suite with Jeffrey Hayzlett. It premiered October 8 and airs weekly Tuesdays at 9:30P ET/PT on Bloomberg. It features an inside look at major companies and brands. Hayzlett investigates the executive team of recognized brands. The show profiles various business models and offers new perspectives on boardroom decision-making.

The show was put together by Hayzlett, Thomas White, and Karl Post. It was produced by Star Crossed Pictures. Producers included Brandon Lisy, Stephen Palgon, and Louis Foglia. It ran for one season.

C-Suite with Jeffrey Hayzlett has been well received, and news of the show has been reported by Inc., U-T San Diego, Business Marketing Association, and a number of other websites.

=== Episodes ===
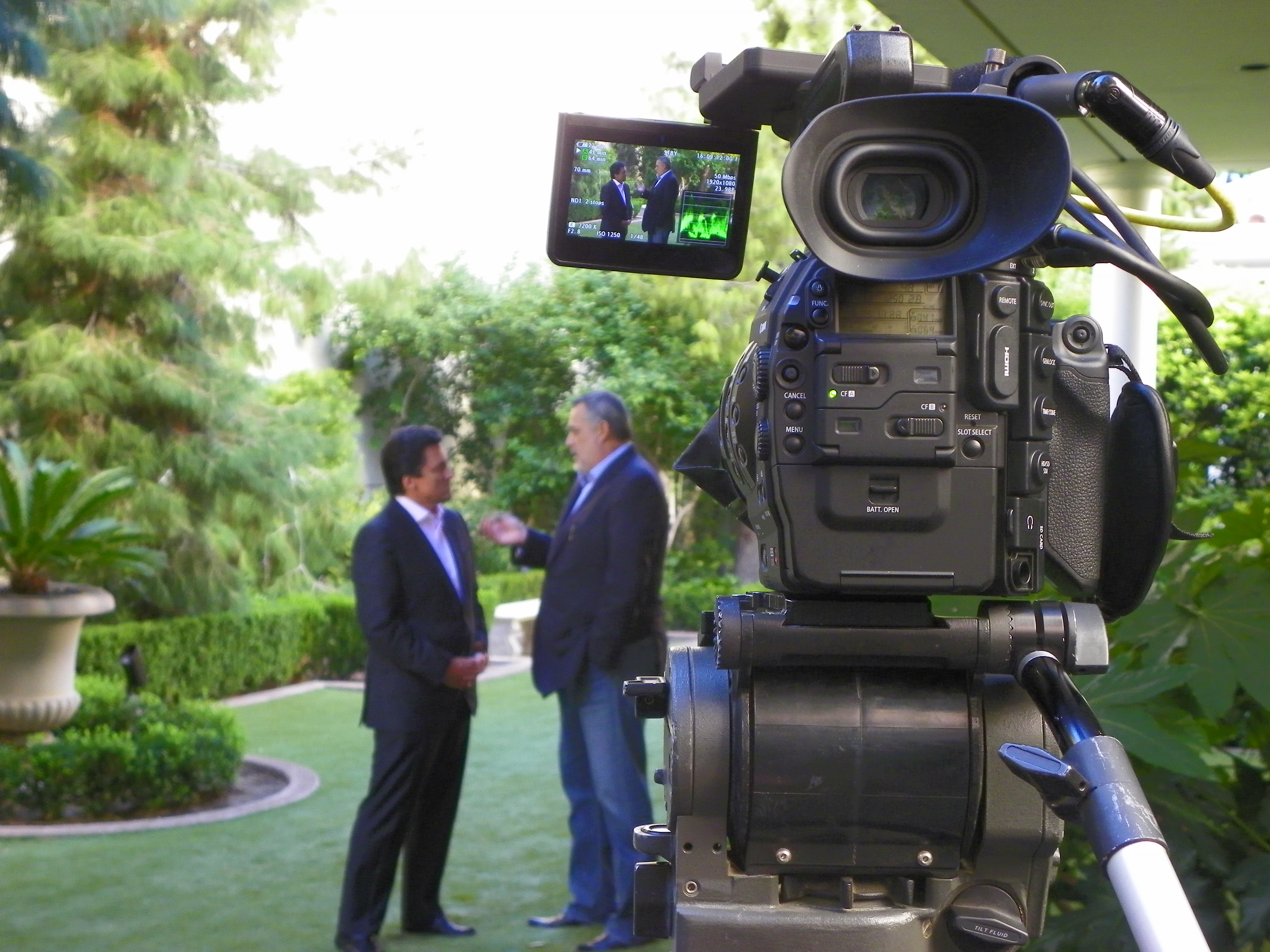
Jeffrey Hayzlett filming at the MGM Grand for his Bloomberg Television show "C-Suite with Jeffrey Hayzlett"

- Dunkin' Brands (Original Air Date: October 8, 2013) Hayzlett visits the c-suite at Dunkin' Brands to discover how the company is reinventing itself with new menu items and a fresh look - and how they're getting franchisee support.
- Seattle Sounders (Original Air Date: October 15, 2013) Hayzlett travels to Seattle to find out how the Major League Soccer franchise Seattle Sounders FC is selling out every home game.
- CrossFit (Original Air Date: October 22, 2013) CrossFit is used as an example of effective marketing and franchising techniques in the fitness industry.
- MGM Resorts International (Original Air Date: October 29, 2013) Hayzlett visits the c-suite at MGM Resorts International, interviewing CEO Jim Murren about the company's sustainability and philanthropic activities, including building the largest LEED certified building in America.

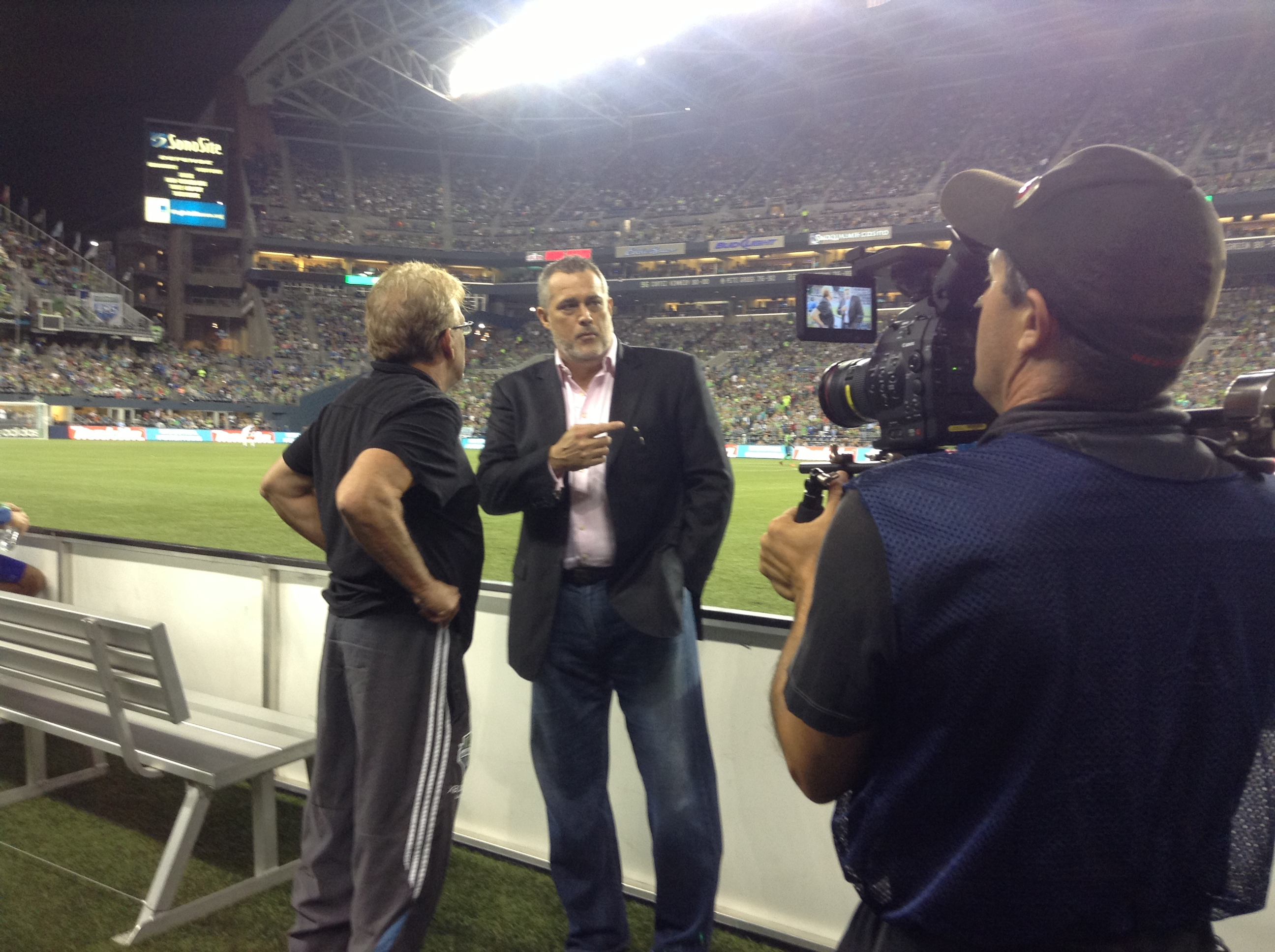
Jeffrey Hayzlett filming on the Seattle Sounders FC sidelines for his Bloomberg Television show "C-Suite with Jeffrey Hayzlett"

- Domino's Pizza (Original Air Date: November 5, 2013) In 2010, Domino's Pizza's future was shaky and their c-suite took an unconventional approach to fix their problems: they told customers their pizza sucked. Hayzlett investigates the effectiveness of this approach.
- Life Technologies (Original Air Date: November 19, 2013) Hayzlett goes inside the biotech giant Life Technologies to find out how the c-suite is preparing for the company's acquisition by Thermo Fisher Scientific.
- Autodesk (Original Air Date: December 3, 2013) Get inside Autodesk, the creators of the design software AutoCAD. Once a company dedicated to computer-aided drafting has grown into a software design leader. How is this company moving their customers from boxed software to the cloud?
- Cadillac (Original Air Date: December 10, 2013) Hayzlett talks with General Motors executives at the Los Angeles Auto Show to find out how they're rebranding the Cadillac to be more than a luxury car for grandparents.

== Board memberships and affiliations ==
Hayzlett is a member of the Board of Governors of the We Are Family Foundation and a co-chair and CMO of Executive Summit, India. He is a Trustee of the Pi Sigma Epsilon National Education Foundation. He is on the Advisory Board of Digital Marketing Group and Packaging Design Magazine. He is a Permanent Trustee and former chairman of SMEI Academy of Achievement Hall of Fame. Hayzlett is also on the boards of Business Marketing Association (former Chairman), Vdopia, RMG Networks, Tagga, Chatalog, Likeable, the Vaud Fund, WayFounder, SlimSurveys, and Covario He is Chairman of the board of itracks, Chairman of Printing Industries Centres Insurance, UK, and advisor to Whale Path. In the past he served on the Advisory Board of WiMax Forum Changes and the boards of MindHive and Sales & Marketing Executives International

== Personal ==
Hayzlett and his wife Tami have two children. They spend their time between Sioux Falls and New York City.
