= Joel Nigg =

American clinical psychologist

Joel T. Nigg
- Born: Joel Thomas Nigg
- Citizenship: American
- Education: Harvard University (A.B., 1980); University of Michigan (M.S.W., 1985); University of California, Berkeley (Ph.D., 1996)
- Known for: Research on attention-deficit/hyperactivity disorder
- Awards: Fellow of the Association for Psychological Science
- Scientific career
- Fields: Clinical psychology
- Institutions: Oregon Health and Science University
- Thesis: Parent personality traits and psychopathology associated with childhood attention deficit hyperactivity disorder (1996)
- Doctoral advisor: Stephen P. Hinshaw

Joel Thomas Nigg is an American clinical psychologist known for his research on attention-deficit/hyperactivity disorder (ADHD). He is Professor of Psychiatry, Pediatrics, and Behavioral Neuroscience at the Oregon Health & Science University (OHSU), where he is also director of the Division of Psychology and of the ADHD program.

Nigg grew up in Dubuque, Iowa. He was educated at Harvard University, from which he received his A.B. in religion and psychology in 1980. After receiving his Master of Social Work degree from the University of Michigan, he developed a growing interest in mental disorders in children. He went on to receive his Ph.D. from the University of California, Berkeley in 1996. He joined the faculty of OHSU in 2008.
