= Mark A. Mathews =

Mark Alexander Mathews
- Born: 3 October 1926; San Diego, California, U.S.
- Died: 27 October 2018 (aged 92); Santa Barbara, California, U.S.
- Education: University of California, Los Angeles, University of Southern California
- Occupations: College President, Professor
- Known for: Third President of California Lutheran College (1972–1980)

Mark Alexander Mathews (b. Oct. 3, 1926, in San Diego, CA - d. Oct 27, 2018, in Santa Barbara, CA) was the third President of California Lutheran College (CLC), from 1972 to 1980. Mathews helped to strengthen the college's finances as it doubled its annual budget, increased enrollment, added several facilities and expanded its graduate programs during his tenure. The Greater Conejo Valley Chamber of Commerce named him “Man of the Year” in 1985 in recognition of his service to community organizations such as Habitat for Humanity, Hospice of the Conejo and the Conejo Future Foundation. He received Cal Lutheran's Honorary Alumni Award in 1992.

== Career ==
California Lutheran College's Board of Regents appointed Mark Mathews as acting college President in February 1972. Prior to his appointment, Mathews was the Chairman of the Business Administration and Economics Department. By-laws were amended at the October Convocation to allow Mathews, a Presbyterian, to serve in the capacity of president, a position normally reserved for Lutherans. Mathews, a graduate of UCLA who earned his advanced degrees in Business Administration from the University of Southern California, had spent thirteen years as a professor at Los Angeles Valley College. He designed the award-winning Business Management Forum in 1972, designed to build bridges to the business community. The Forum was later renamed in his honor (“Mathews Leadership Forum”) and brought numerous business leaders to Cal Lutheran to talk to students on important issues. The Board of Regents offered him the permanent position of President in July 1972, and Mathews became the college's third chief executive. He postponed his inauguration until October 1973 when an outdoor inauguration was held at Mt. Clef Stadium followed by a picnic barbecue in Kingsmen Park.

For his cabinet, Mathews appointed Peter Ristuben, a former Dean at Wagner College, Vice President for Academic Affairs; Roald Kindem, a minister from the American Lutheran Church as vice president for Development; A. Dean Buchanan, Vice President for Business and Finance from Pacific Lutheran University, in the same capacity. Furthermore, he elevated the campus pastor, a position held by Gerald Swanson, to the cabinet level, in order to emphasize the importance of religion in his administration. One of the first steps of the new administration was to install a budget planning process which involved input from all segments of the administration and all faculty departments. As a result, Mathews’ years at Cal Lutheran were recognized for its financial stability and balanced budgets. An indication of his business approach was an instruction of annual reports, outlining financial operations and budgets for the Regents, constituent groups, foundations, and corporations. Mathews also formed the Committee for New Dimensions to reach into the business community of nearby Los Angeles and other civic, county, and industrial leaders. Efforts were made to recruit corporate leadership. It was also during Mathews’ administration that the Chair of the Faculty Association and the President of the Associated Students of CLC (ASCLC) became members of the Board of Regents.

In the fall of 1979 he presented his resignation to the Board of Regents effective May, 1980, after eight years as president. He was granted a year sabbatical leave before returning to the Business Administration and Economics Department as a professor.
