= Elmen Center =

Arena in Sioux Falls, South Dakota

Coordinates: 43°31′18″N 96°44′31″W

The Elmen Center is the former basketball arena and hosts volleyball games for the Augustana University Vikings in Sioux Falls, South Dakota. It is located on the Augustana campus. The Elmen Center seats approximately 4,000 fans. The building is also the recreational center for the university and a host of several late night events. The Elmen Center is 81,000 square feet.

The Elmen Center was completed in 1989. Previously, Augustana basketball games were held at the Sioux Falls Arena. In 2000, the Elmen Center was the location of the NCAA Division II Elite 8 volleyball tournament.

In addition to sports, the building can be used as a venue for concerts.

On October 15, 2009, a fire broke out in the building after an object was left on hot equipment in the sauna. The fire resulted in the building's evacuation and about $25,000 in damage.

In 2014 Augustana University agreed to a new deal which moved Men's and Women's doubleheaders into the Sioux Falls Arena, The Elmen Center now only hosts single basketball games, along with volleyball and wrestling matches.
