= Augustana University Vikings =

Sports program of Augustana University in Sioux Falls, South Dakota

Augustana Vikings
- University: Augustana University
- Nickname: Vikings
- NCAA: Division II (primary); Division I (men's ice hockey)
- Conference: NSIC (primary); CCHA (men's ice hockey)
- Athletic director: Josh Morton
- Location: Sioux Falls, South Dakota
- Varsity teams: 22 (10 men's, 12 women's)
- Football stadium: Kirkeby–Over Stadium
- Basketball arena: Elmen Center; Sanford Pentagon
- Baseball stadium: Ronken Field
- Softball stadium: Bowden Field
- Soccer stadium: Morstad Field
- Other venues: Howard Wood Field; Sanford Gymnasium
- Colors: Navy and gold
- Website: goaugie.com
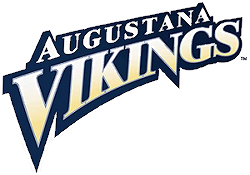

Team NCAA championships
- 5

The Augustana Vikings are the athletic teams that represent Augustana University, located in Sioux Falls, South Dakota, in NCAA Division II intercollegiate sports. The Vikings compete as members of the Northern Sun Intercollegiate Conference for all 14 varsity sports. The Vikings joined the NSIC from the North Central Conference, which folded in 2008.

== Project 2030 ==
In December 2018, as part of a plan called "Project 2030", Augustana announced its intentions to transition to NCAA Division I by 2030 at the latest, with hopes to receive a bid to join a Division I conference by 2020. Multiple regional media reports in 2018 indicated that Augustana's likeliest Division I destination was the Sioux Falls-based Summit League. Many of the school's boosters are tied to Sanford Health, a hospital company also based in Sioux Falls that has long been a major sponsor of the Summit League. Additionally, the conference moved its headquarters in 2018 to an office complex owned by Sanford.

On May 22, 2020, the Summit League commissioner, Tom Douple, informed Augustana president Stephanie Herseth Sandlin that the conference would not be adding the Vikings. Despite the snub from the Summit League, Augustana launched a Division I men's ice hockey program in 2023, marking their first Division I sport. As of 2024, plans for a transition to Division I in sports outside hockey have effectively ended. Summit League commissioner Josh Fenton stated in an interview that they have not had discussions about adding Augustana anymore, partially due to the school's pivot towards Division I hockey, a sport the Summit League does not sponsor. Additionally, the university stated they are no longer actively pursuing any Division I all-sports conferences, instead opting to focus on their Division I hockey program.

== Varsity sports ==
Men's sports	Women's sports
Baseball	Softball
Basketball	Basketball
Cross Country	Cross Country
Football	Soccer
Golf	Golf
Ice Hockey	Acrobatics and tumbling
Swimming and diving	Swimming and diving
Tennis	Tennis
Track & Field	Track & Field
Wrestling	Volleyball

== National championships ==
=== NCAA ===
- 1991 – Softball
- 2011 – Women's Cross Country
- 2016 – Men's Basketball
- 2018 – Baseball
- 2019 – Softball

== Individual programs ==
=== Football ===
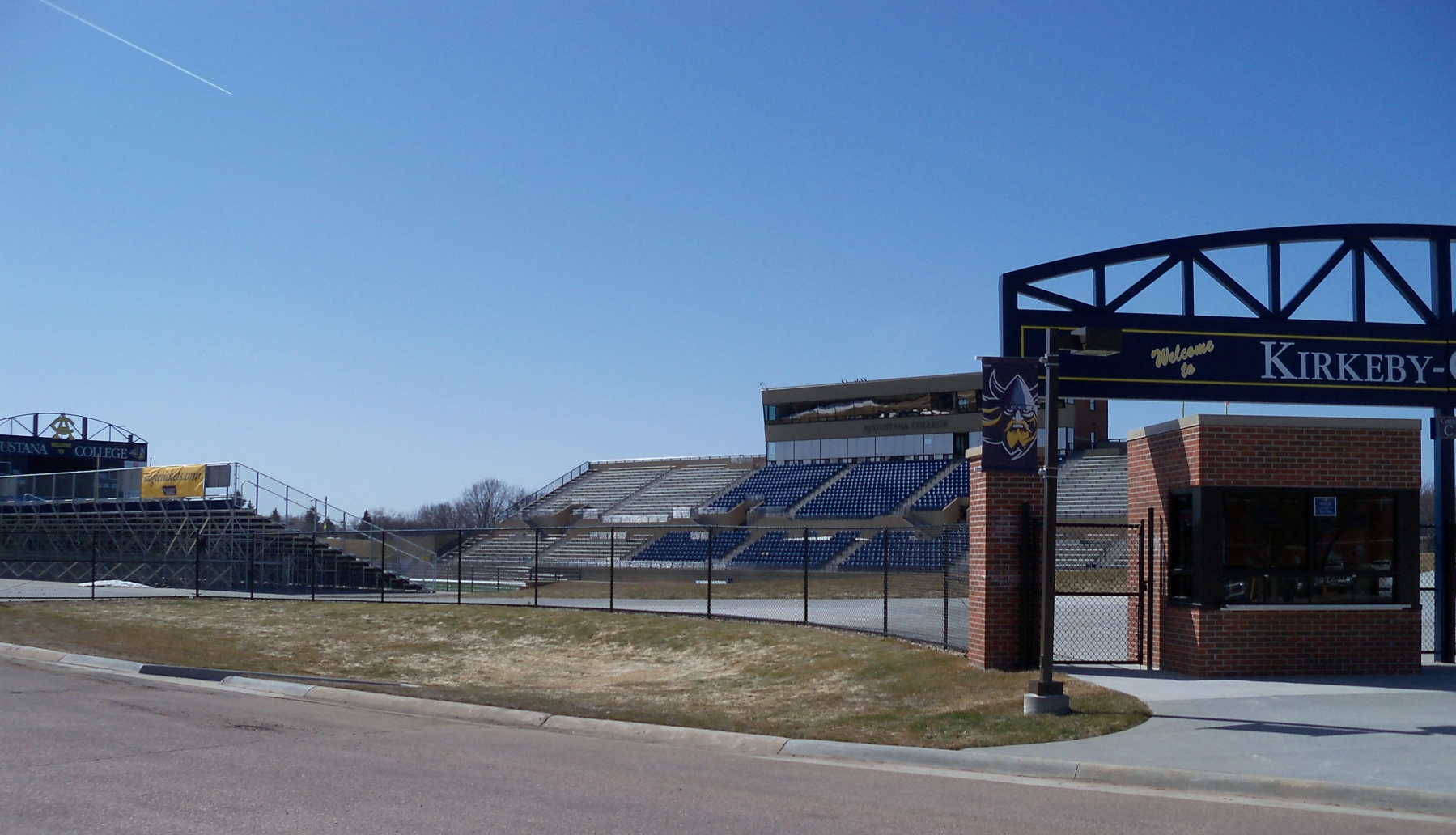
Kirkeby–Over Stadium seats over 6,500 fans.

On September 26, 2007, it was officially announced that Bob and Kari Hall were making a $7.1 million donation for an on-campus football stadium. The stadium is to bear the name Kirkeby-Over Stadium in honor of Kari Hall's parents. Construction began on November 12, 2007 with the official groundbreaking taking place on November 16, 2007. Augustana University recently completed the Hall Football Complex; complete with its own locker rooms, weight room, and football meeting rooms. The head football coach is Jerry Olszewski.

Augustana players who have had significant NFL careers include Les Josephson (Los Angeles Rams 1964–1974), Bryan Schwartz (Jacksonville Jaguars 1995–1999), Corbin Lacina (1993–2003), Kevin Kaesviharn (2001–2009), and C. J. Ham (Minnesota Vikings 2016–2025).

The Vikings have appeared in the NCAA Division II playoffs eight times. Their combined record is 2–8.

Year	Round	Opponent	Result
1988	First Round	North Dakota State	L 7–49
1989	First Round	St. Cloud State	L 20–27
2010	Second Round; Quarterfinals	Grand Valley State; Minnesota–Duluth	W 38–6; L 13–24
2015	First Round	Humboldt State	L 31–45
2019	First Round	Colorado State–Pueblo	L 0–17
2021	First Round	Bemidji State	L 24–28
2023	First Round; Second Round	Minnesota State; Colorado Mines	W 51–24; L 10–56
2024	First Round	Minnesota State	L 19–20

=== Wrestling ===
In 1976–77, 2004–05, and 2009–10, the Augustana wrestling team finished second in the NCAA Division II Championship. The Elmen Center serves as the home for both the volleyball team and the wrestling team.

=== Men's Basketball ===
In 2015–16 the men's basketball team coached by Tom Billeter finished the season 34–2 and won the NCAA Division II National Championship. On November 6, 2015, at Carver-Hawkeye Arena in Iowa City, the Vikings upset the Iowa Hawkeyes of the Big Ten Conference 76–74 in an exhibition game on a buzzer-beating right-handed jumper by Daniel Jansen. Led by Jansen, the Northern Sun Intercollegiate Conference's Player of the Year, the Vikings were 21–1 in the Northern Sun, then won the NSIC tournament title and captured the Central Regional title with an 80–78 victory over Northwest Missouri State to qualify for the Elite Eight, which was played at Dr Pepper Arena in Frisco, Texas. Augustana defeated Lincoln Memorial 90–81 in the championship game on March 26. Augustana's Arvid Kramer and Brett Szabo both played in the NBA.

The Vikings have appeared in the NCAA Division II Tournament fifteen times. Their combined record is 19–17. They were national champions in 2016.

Year	Round	Opponent	Result
1975	Regional semifinals Regional 3rd-place game	Nebraska-Omaha; Missouri—Rolla	L 61–69; W 71–64
1977	Regional semifinals Regional 3rd-place game	North Dakota; Nebraska–Omaha	L 64–71; L 91–93
1978	Regional semifinals Regional Finals	Chapman; Wisconsin–Green Bay	W 78–66; L 60–72
1986	Regional semifinals Regional 3rd-place game	Wayne State (MI); Eastern Montana	L 57–72; L 61–86
1988	Regional semifinals Regional 3rd-place game	Ferris State; St. Cloud State	L 75–91; L 114–118 ^{OT}
1989	Regional semifinals Regional 3rd-place game	Wisconsin–Milwaukee; Alaska–Fairbanks	L 95–99; W 112–107 ^{OT}
2008	Regional Quarterfinals; Regional semifinals	Minnesota State–Mankato; Northern State	W 95–87; L 66–75
2009	Regional Quarterfinals; Regional semifinals Regional Finals	St. Cloud State; Winona State; Southwest Minnesota State	W 73–72; W 88–82; L 60–73
2010	Regional Quarterfinals; Regional semifinals Regional Finals	New Mexico Highlands; Mesa State; St. Cloud State	W 87–73; W 95–84; L 75–84 ^{OT}
2012	Regional Quarterfinals	Colorado Mines	L 69–82
2013	Regional Quarterfinals; Regional semifinals	Upper Iowa; Winona State	W 79–65; L 65–77
2015	Regional Quarterfinals; Regional semifinals	Arkansas Tech; Northwest Missouri State	W 104–77; L 65–66
2016	Regional Quarterfinals; Regional semifinals Regional Finals; Elite Eight; Final Four; National Championship Game	Harding; Nebraska–Kearney; Northwest Missouri State; Tarleton State; Western Oregon; Lincoln Memorial	W 100–85; W 77–67; W 80–78; W 86–79; W 74–55; W 90–81
2017	Regional Quarterfinals; Regional semifinals	Arkansas–Monticello; Northwest Missouri State	W 76–69; L 53–74
2022	Regional Quarterfinals; Regional semifinals Regional Finals	Southwestern Oklahoma State; Upper Iowa; Northwest Missouri State	W 83–64; W 65–60; L 56–70

=== Women's Basketball ===
The Vikings have appeared in the NCAA Division II Tournament fifteen times. The 2012–13 women's basketball team played at San Antonio in the NCAA Division II Elite Eight. Their combined record is 12–15.

Year	Round	Opponent	Result
1990	Regional semifinals	North Dakota	L 78–93
1991	Regional semifinals	North Dakota State	L 89–90
1992	Regional semifinals Regional Finals	Nebraska–Omaha; North Dakota State	W 83–70; L 69–104
1993	Regional semifinals Regional Finals	North Dakota; North Dakota State	W 79–67; L 82–91
1994	Regional First round Regional semifinals	Metro State; North Dakota State	W 88–65; L 59–82
1997	Regional First round	Northern State	L 65–68
1999	Regional First round Regional semifinals	South Dakota State; North Dakota	W 66–62; L 62–84
2006	Regional Quarterfinals	St. Cloud State	L 69–82
2007	Regional Quarterfinals	Nebraska–Kearney	L 68–75
2009	Regional Quarterfinals	Minnesota State–Mankato	L 68–81
2010	Regional Quarterfinals; Regional semifinals	Minnesota–Duluth; Fort Lewis	W 74–57; L 52–79
2012	Regional Quarterfinals; Regional semifinals	Colorado State–Pueblo; Wayne State (NE)	W 82–76; L 40–63
2013	Regional Quarterfinals; Regional semifinals Regional Finals; Elite Eight; Final Four	Concordia–St. Paul; Southwestern Oklahoma State; Emporia State; Clayton State; Dowling	W 78–66; W 68–64; W 75–74; W 81–68; L 54–76
2018	Regional Quarterfinals; Regional semifinals Regional Finals	Lindenwood; Northern State; Central Missouri	W 75–41; W 90–86; L 42–81
2023	Regional Quarterfinals	Missouri Southern State	L 74–75

The Sanford Pentagon and the Elmen Center serve as the home court for the men's and women's basketball teams.

=== Baseball ===
The 2018 Augustana baseball team won the NCAA Division II College World Series, defeating Columbus State 3–2 in the final. They finished the year 52–9, a school record.

=== Ice Hockey ===
On October 5, 2021, Augustana University announced plans to add men's ice hockey starting in the fall of 2023. The team competes at the NCAA Division I level in the CCHA. The announcement was made at the groundbreaking ceremony for Midco Arena which will serves as the team's home. The Vikings are coached by Garrett Raboin.

== Awards and honors ==
- Kendall Cornick - 2021 NCAA Woman of the Year Award
