= Daniel Jansen (basketball) =

American basketball player (born 1994)

Personal information
- Born: March 28, 1994 (age 32) Orange City, Iowa, U.S.
- Listed height: 6 ft 9 in (2.06 m)
- Listed weight: 235 lb (107 kg)

Career information
- High school: MOC-Floyd Valley (Orange City, Iowa)
- College: Augustana (South Dakota) (2012–2016)
- NBA draft: 2016: undrafted
- Playing career: 2016–2018
- Position: Power forward

Career history
- 2016–2017: Limburg United
- 2017: MZT Skopje

Career highlights
- NCAA Division II champion (2016); NABC Division II Player of the Year (2016); 2× First-team Division II All-American (2015, 2016); 2× NSIC Player of the Year (2015, 2016); 3× First-team All-NSIC (2014–2016)

Daniel Jansen (born March 28, 1994) is an American professional basketball player who last played for MZT Skopje of the Macedonian League. He played college basketball at Augustana University from 2012–2016.

== Playing career ==
=== High school and college ===
Jansen grew up in Orange City, Iowa, and played high school ball at MOC-Floyd Valley. He joined the Augustana University Vikings in 2012. In 2016, he was named the Northern Sun Intercollegiate Conference Player of the Year, and also NCAA Division II national player of the year. He became the school's all-time leading scorer with 2255 points.

=== Professional career ===
After graduating from Augustana in 2016, he signed with Limburg United of the Belgium Division I. In 33 regular season games Jansen averaged 9.2 points and 3.4 rebounds per game while bumping his scoring output up to 17.3 points in the playoffs.

On 18 August 2017, he signed with Macedonian basketball club MZT Skopje. He made his debut for MZT Skopje in their season opener on September 29, 2017, scoring 14 points, three rebounds and one assist in a 92–89 win over the Partizan. On 27 October 2017, he left MZT Skopje.
