= Augustana University =

Lutheran university in Sioux Falls, South Dakota, US

- Former names: Augustana College and Seminary (1860–1918); Augustana College and Normal School (1918–1926); Augustana College (1926–2015)
- Motto: Verbum Dei manet in aeternum
- Motto in English: The Word of God endures forever
- Type: Private university
- Established: 1860; 166 years ago
- Religious affiliation: Evangelical Lutheran Church in America
- Endowment: $126+ million (2024)
- President: Stephanie Herseth Sandlin
- Faculty: 134
- Students: 2,390
- Undergraduates: 2,003
- Postgraduates: 387
- Location: Sioux Falls, South Dakota, United States; 43°31′36.7″N 96°44′13.3″W
- Campus: Urban 100 acres (40 ha)
- Colors: Navy blue and gold
- Nickname: Vikings
- Sporting affiliations: NCAA Division II – NSIC
- Mascot: Ole the Viking
- Website: www.augie.edu

Augustana University is a private Lutheran university in Sioux Falls, South Dakota, United States. The university identifies 1860 as the year of its founding. It derives its name from the Confessio Augustana, or Augsburg Confession, a foundational document of Lutheranism. Until September 2015, the university was known as Augustana College. Augustana is South Dakota's largest private university. It offers more than 100 majors, minors, and pre-professional and graduate programs.

== History ==
Augustana traces its origin to 1835 when Scandinavian immigrants established the Hillsboro Academy in Hillsboro, Illinois. In 1846, the academy became the Literary and Theological Institute of the Lutheran Church of the Far West before moving to Springfield, Illinois, under the name Illinois State University. In 1860, after church leaders formed the Scandinavian Evangelical Lutheran Augustana Synod, Professor Lars Paul Esbjörn and a group of followers moved to Chicago to create their institution. There they established the Augustana College and Seminary, marking the date that the university identifies as the year of its founding.

As the United States expanded westward during and after the American Civil War, pioneers moved the school to Paxton, Illinois, in 1863. There, a split occurred: the Norwegian leadership, desiring to create their school, relocated to Marshall, Wisconsin, in 1869, while the Swedes later moved to Rock Island, Illinois, establishing Augustana College (Illinois). The school at Marshall moved to Beloit, Iowa, in 1881, and then to Canton, South Dakota, in 1888.

The Lutheran Normal School opened in 1889 in Sioux Falls, housed in what is now known as Old Main, to educate teachers. City and business leaders lobbied for Augustana to relocate to Sioux Falls, and church leaders in 1918 merged the Lutheran Normal School and Augustana College in Canton under the name Augustana College and Normal School. In 1926, "and Normal School" was dropped from the name and the Canton site eventually became Augustana Academy. Despite the similarities in name, the academy was no longer affiliated with the college, and closed in 1971. The 2010–11 academic year marked Augustana University's sesquicentennial.

Augustana draws its name from the origin of the Lutheran Church in the Augsburg Confession, written in 1530 during the Protestant Reformation. "Augustana" stems from the document's Latin name, Confessio Augustana. On August 21, 2015, the school announced that it would change its name from Augustana College to Augustana University as of September 1, 2015.

== Academics ==
Augustana University offers more than 100 majors, minors, and pre-professional and graduate programs. The top majors declared by Augustana students include nursing, biology, business administration, psychology, exercise science, finance, elementary education, computer science, accounting and marketing.

The university's curriculum is based on a calendar divided into two 15-week semesters, separated by an interim period of four weeks during January, as well as an optional summer term of eight weeks. Classes and study-away programs are offered during January. The school has a 12:1 student-to-faculty ratio.

Extensive internship, study abroad, undergraduate research and Civitas, the university's honors program, supplement Augustana's curriculum. Between 2007 and 2008, 285 students participated in an international educational experience, and 44% of students studied abroad before graduation.

In 2023, Augustana's financial endowment surpassed $115 million. Donations have allowed the school to expand its academic facilities, such as the renovation of the Mikkelsen Library, 2015 reconstruction of the Froiland Science Complex (formerly Gilbert Science Center), 2022 addition of Ralph H. Wagoner Hall, 2023 addition of Midco Arena, and ongoing construction of the Morrison Commons.

=== Admissions and rankings ===
As of 2016, Augustana's student body consisted of 1,825 undergraduates, 99% full-time students and 1% part-time, and 59% female. The acceptance rate is 61%. U.S. News & World Report classified Augustana as a "more selective" school, with 62% of the students enrolled having graduated from high school in the top quartile of their class, the average GPA being 3.7. ACT test score submissions had a 23–28 middle 50% range, with an average ACT composite score of 26. The school's retention rate of freshmen returning as sophomores was 80% between 2013 and 2014.

Those enrolled are primarily from South Dakota (42%) and Minnesota (34%), followed by Iowa (12%) and Nebraska (4%). In the fall of the 2010–11 academic year, Augustana reported its largest ever incoming class of international students. Fifty-four new students, representing 20 countries and five continents, joined 25 continuing international students for a total of 79 international students from 23 countries, making up about 4.5% of the student body. Although only 46% of students claim a preference for the school's Lutheran religious affiliation, the school is nevertheless composed primarily of students following a Christian denomination, with Catholicism the second largest at 21%; 22% of students are categorized as "other".

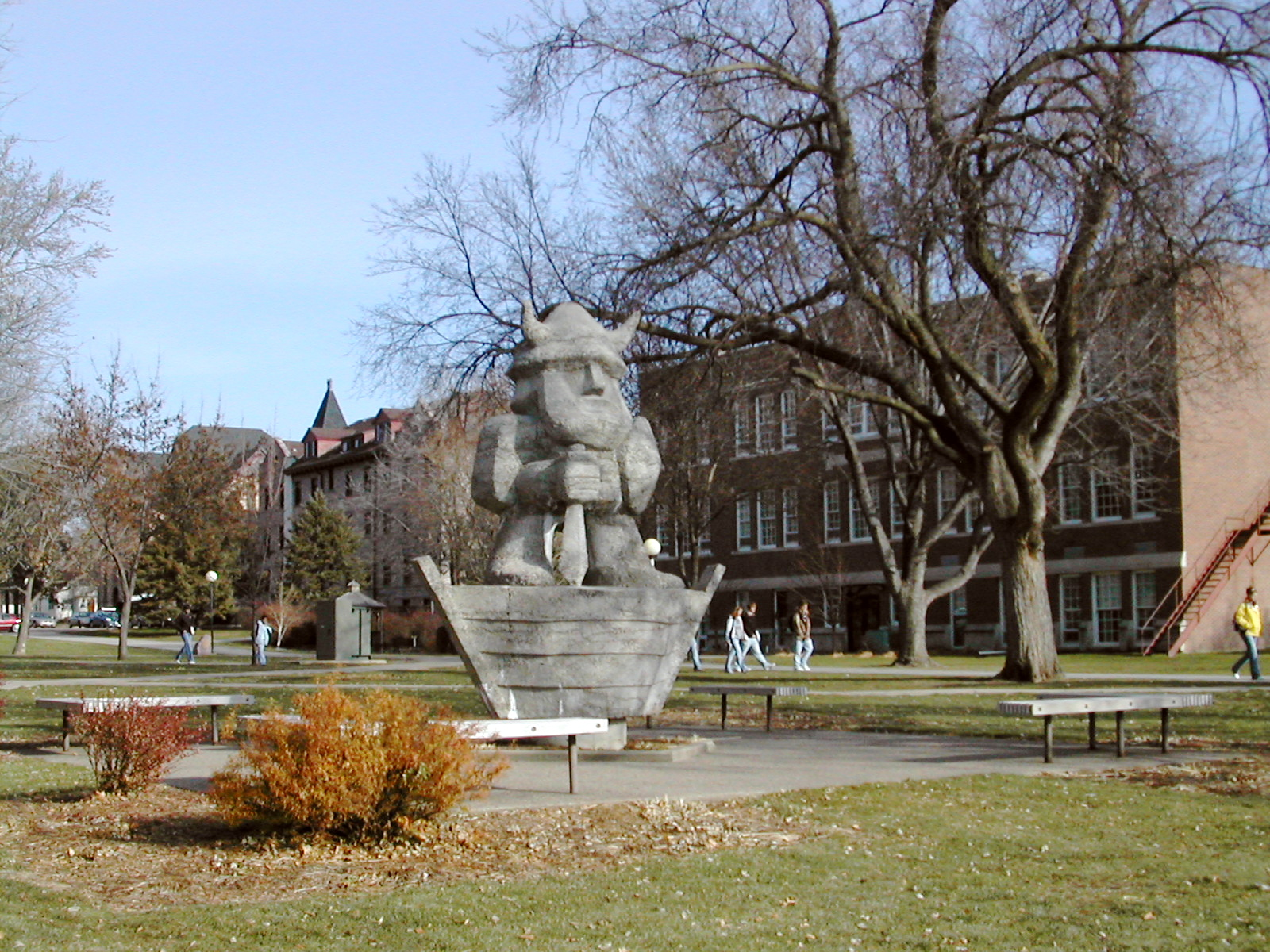
Campus statue of Ole, Augustana's mascot

In the 2015 U.S. News & World Report ranking of Midwestern colleges, Augustana placed third. The publication also named it a "Best Buy" school, a designation based on academic quality in relation to cost. The Princeton Review named Augustana one of 159 "Best in the Midwest" schools in 2015. In 2017, Forbes's list of "America's Top Colleges" placed Augustana 97th among schools in the Midwest and 423rd overall.

=== Arts ===
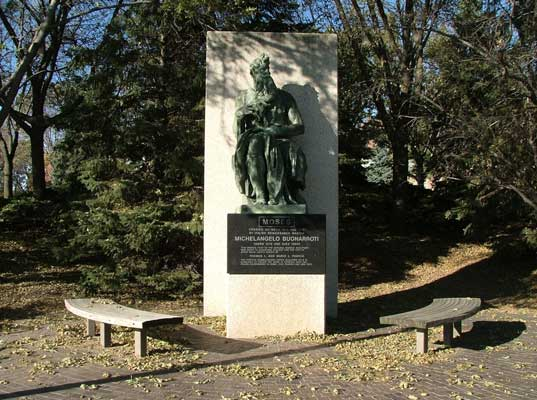
Replica of Michelangelo's Moses at Augustana University

Augustana created the Center for Western Studies in 1970, founded by professor Herbert Krause, which serves as a library, repository for special collections of art and artifacts, and academic publisher. The center holds an annual Dakota Conference on the Northern Plains for history, literature, art, and archaeology. It is "the largest annual humanities conference specifically about the Northern Plains". In addition to shows and galleries of Western, Scandinavian, and Native American art, the Center also hosts the Boe Forum on Public Affairs, which has featured speakers such as Pervez Musharraf, Sandra Day O'Connor, and Mikhail Gorbachev.

The Augustana Choir and Concert Band tour widely nationally and internationally, including to China, Italy, and Tanzania. While on tour in Egypt during the Revolution of 2011, the band was briefly stranded in Cairo due to anti-government protests.

The Augustana University Theatre Company presents four main-stage shows each year, one of which is a musical, as well as two student-produced shows by the Augustana Collaborative Theatrical Society. Augustana Theatre sponsors an improv group, Brand Name Improv. The department also hosts the Claire Donaldson New Play Festival (formerly the 8-in-48 Claire Donaldson Short Play Festival), which occurs every other year. It was the first theatre department in the state to host a 24 hour play festival. In 2023, the department collaborated with Lifescapes of Sioux Falls and the Black Hills Playhouse to perform the first all-abilities show, which included a half Augustana cast and a half Lifescapes cast, which Augustana students designing as well.

In 2006, the Center for Visual Arts replaced the old art department buildings, previously used as barracks during World War II. It has artist and professor studios, studio classrooms for design, drawing, printmaking, painting, sculpture, ceramics, an art education lab, and the Eide-Dalrymple Gallery, which hosts several art exhibitions every year.

=== Civitas ===
Augustana's honors program, Civitas, launched in 2007. "Civitas" is Latin for "citizenship", and the program is built upon the work of Dietrich Bonhoeffer, a German Lutheran pastor and theologian who was a founding member of the Confessing Church and a participant in the German resistance movement against Nazism. Bonhoeffer's essay "The Structure of Responsible Life" is the program's central focus. Emphasizing Stellvertretung (roughly translated as "vicarious representative action"), Bonhoeffer participated in the Abwehr plot to assassinate Hitler and subsequently wrote the piece as a justification for his actions. Students examine his work in classes specifically designated for Civitas and in special honors sections of existing courses. 40 students are selected from each graduating class; they must maintain a minimum 3.0 GPA, with entrance priority going to incoming students with an ACT score of at least 27 and a 3.5 cumulative high school GPA.

== Athletics ==
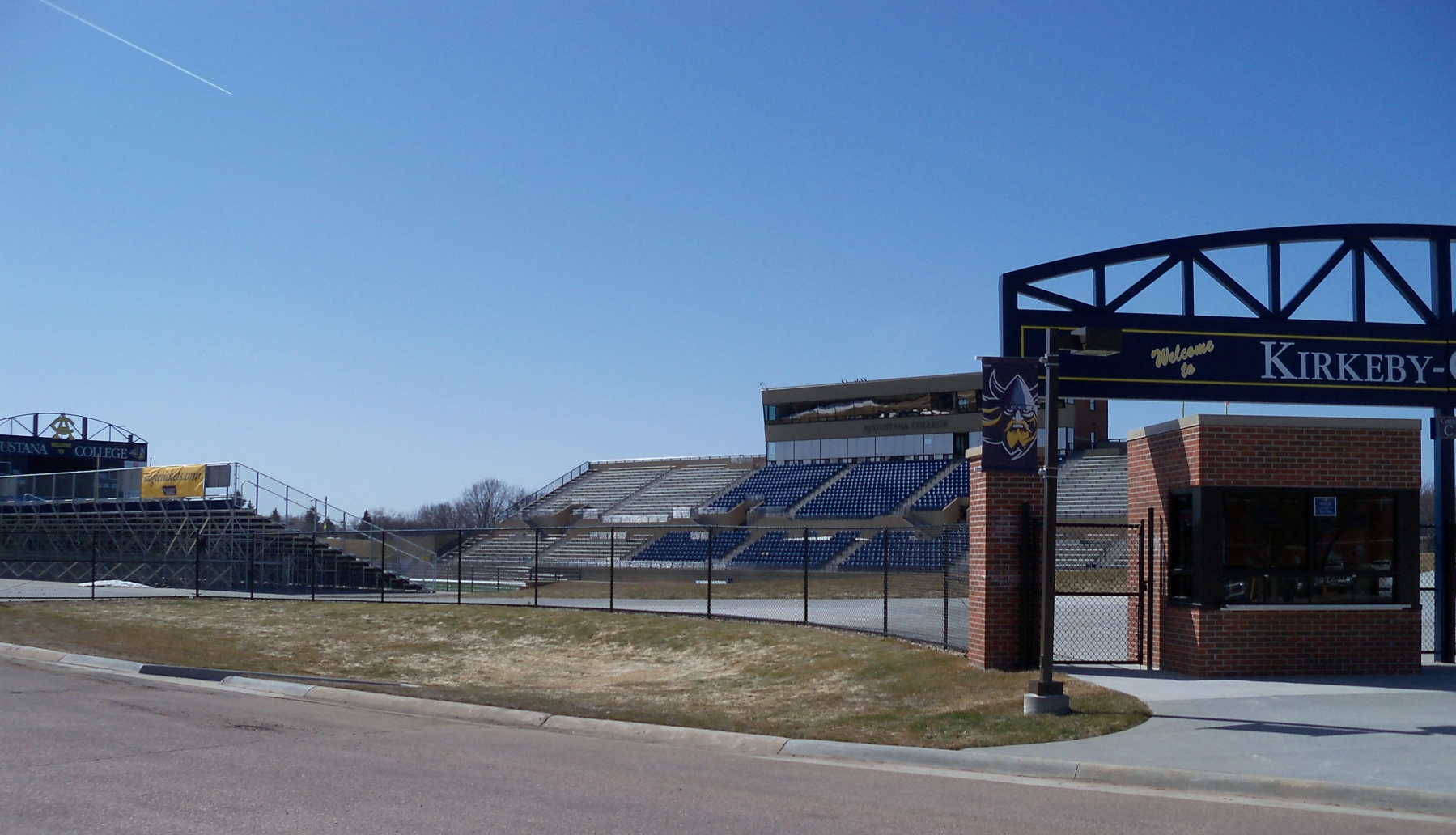
Kirkeby–Over Stadium seats over 6,500 fans.

The Augustana Vikings participate in NCAA Division II athletics in the Northern Sun Intercollegiate Conference (NSIC). The Vikings joined the NSIC from the North Central Conference, which folded in 2008. The men's basketball team won the NCAA Division II national championship in 2016. The women's basketball team advanced to the NCAA Division II Final Four in 2013. The men's baseball team won the NCAA Division II national championship in 2018. During both the 2004–05 and 2009–10 school years, Augustana wrestlers finished second in the NCAA Division II championship. The Sanford Pentagon is the home court for the men's and women's basketball teams. The Elmen Center, opened in 1989, is the home venue for the volleyball and wrestling teams.

On December 13, 2018, President Stephanie Herseth Sandlin announced that Augustana would begin pursuing a transition to Division I as part of the university's "Vision 2030" plan. In the fall of 2023, Augustana University launched their Division I men's hockey team, a step towards Sandlin's goal. As of 2024, following the Summit League's denial of Augustana's application, the plan has generally been abandoned.

== Media ==
The college used to operate a radio station, 89.1 FM KAUR, that broadcasts 24 hours per day. Until 2009, KAUR broadcast a variety of genres of music and specialized in independent or college rock. KAUR was founded in 1972. Augustana also had a self-constructed AM station, founded in 1945. In 2009, Augustana administrators discontinued KAUR's student operations in favor of broadcasting Minnesota Public Radio News.
