= Le Moyne Dolphins men's basketball =

NCAA Division I men's basketball team representing Le Moyne College

2025–26 Le Moyne Dolphins men's basketball team
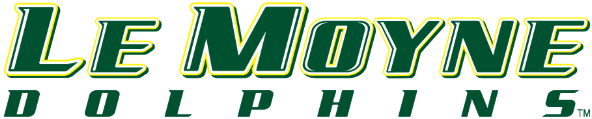
- College: Le Moyne College
- First season: 1948–49; 78 years ago
- Athletic director: Phil Brown
- Head coach: Nate Champion (7th (Note: Le Moyne did not play during the 2020–21 season due to the COVID-19 pandemic. Consequently, this is Champion's eighth year as the team's head coach but only his seventh season.) season)
- Location: DeWitt, New York (Note: Le Moyne College's campus, including the Le Moyne Events Center, has a Syracuse mailing address but lies primarily within the adjacent town of DeWitt.)
- Arena: Le Moyne Events Center (capacity: 2,000)
- Conference: NEC
- Nickname: Dolphins (official) Unofficial: The Green & Gold; Heightsmen; Nilandmen (1948–1973)
- Colors: Green and gold
- Student section: Mad Hatters (1976–1983); Roundball Rowdies (1997); Fin Bin (1999–2004)
- All-time record: 1,089–860 (.559) through 2024–25 season

NCAA Division II tournament Elite Eight
- 2018
Other NCAA Division II tournament results
Sweet Sixteen	1959, 1964, 2018
Appearances	1959, 1960, 1964, 1965, 1966, 1968, 1969, 1988, 1996, 1997, 2014, 2017, 2018, 2019

Conference tournament champions
- Middle Eastern College Athletic Association (MECAA): 1960 (Note: Tournament was held in December 1960, not in the postseason. All active conference members participated along with three non-members.) Mideast Collegiate Conference (MECC): 1988 New England Collegiate Conference (NECC): 1996 Northeast-10 Conference (NE10): 1997, 2018

Conference regular-season champions
- MECAA: 1959, (Note: Co-champions with Iona) 1960, 1962, 1964, 1965, 1969, (Note: Co-champions with Saint Peter's) 1973 MECC: 1984, 1988 (Note: Co-champions with Gannon) NE10: 2017, (Note: The Northeast-10 Conference was split into divisions this season, and Le Moyne had the league's best regular-season record in conference games, regardless of division. Le Moyne was the overall no. 1 seed in the conference tournament.) 2018, 2020

Conference division champions
- NE10 Southwest Division: 2017, 2018, 2019, 2020

Uniforms
Home	Away

The Le Moyne Dolphins men's basketball program is the men's college basketball team of Le Moyne College. The Dolphins compete in Division I of the National Collegiate Athletic Association (NCAA) as a member of the Northeast Conference and are currently coached by Nate Champion. The Dolphins have played their home games on Ted Grant Court at the Le Moyne Events Center in DeWitt, New York since 1962.

The Dolphins are currently transitioning to Division I and are ineligible to participate in NCAA-sponsored postseason play, including the NCAA tournament, until the 2026–27 season, assuming they meet the revised criteria under January 2025 NCAA legislation to have their four-year transition period reduced to three years. Le Moyne has notified the NCAA of its intention to accelerate its transition.

== History ==
=== Birth of a program (1948–1958) ===
The Dolphins' first varsity basketball game was a home game at the State Fair Coliseum against Siena on December 7, 1948, a 41–39 loss for Le Moyne. The opening game against Siena had been treated by Le Moyne's student body as not simply the debut of the Dolphins as a basketball team but as the first game of what was expected to become a heated rivalry. In anticipation of the game, "BEAT SIENA!" was emblazoned across the front page of the school newspaper. A pep rally was held the night before the Siena game and attended by the team, the head coach, the athletics moderator, Rev. Vincent B. Ryan, S.J., and, of course, the cheerleaders.

Le Moyne's first head coach and athletic director was Tommy Niland, who mentored the varsity basketball team for 25 years, until 1973. Niland remained at Le Moyne after his coaching career ended, continuing in his role as the athletic director until his retirement in 1990. Le Moyne's athletics center is named in his honor.

Le Moyne's first victory came on the road at the Geneva Armory against Hobart on December 10, 1948. Dave Lozo scored 13 points, and team captain Don Savage added 11, as Le Moyne cruised to a 50–37 victory.

During the first three years of its varsity basketball program, Le Moyne was led on the court by Don Savage. Savage had appeared in Le Moyne College's first ever intercollegiate contest on December 4, 1947, a 62–57 overtime victory for the freshman basketball team at Utica. More than 400 Le Moyne students made the trip to see the game. Savage had eight points in that game, while Dave Lozo scored a game-high 18 for the Dolphin Cubs. Joe Boehm served as captain of that freshman team, which went 16–4 and was coached by Tommy Niland in an effort to build the basketball program from the ground up. Niland pulled double duty, serving as coach of both the varsity and freshman teams through the end of the 1949–50 season.

The challenge faced by Le Moyne during its inaugural varsity season was unique. The Dolphins were not simply a first-year basketball team; Le Moyne College was a second-year institution. Therefore, the Dolphins were composed entirely of sophomores and faced teams with experienced juniors and seniors in every game.

In June 1950, Le Moyne became a charter member of the Eastern Catholic Intercollegiate Athletic Conference (ECIAC). After only one season, the ECIAC ceased publicizing itself as a conference and became an association of its member schools with no basketball champion crowned, leaving Le Moyne an independent again for 1951–52.

In June 1955, Le Moyne became a charter member of the new Middle Eastern College Athletic Association (MECAA).

The Dolphins produced seven winning campaigns and only two losing records in the first 10 seasons of their varsity program. They made their first postseason appearance in only their second season with no seniors on the roster at the 1950 Utica Optimist Club Invitational Tournament and took the title. Le Moyne followed up by repeating as champions in Utica in 1951 and 1952.

The Dolphins participated in the prestigious National Catholic Invitational Tournament (NCIT) in both 1951 and 1952. At the 1951 tournament, Le Moyne defeated archrival Siena, ranked no. 18 in the AP major program poll, on the Indians' home floor, the Dolphins' first victory over a ranked major program. Le Moyne finished third in the 1951 tournament and reached the quarterfinals in 1952.

The Dolphins had 25 wins over University Division/major programs during their first decade, three of which came against opponents ranked in the AP major program poll. Their record against such foes was 25–49, including 3–4 versus ranked teams.

Don Savage was drafted by the Syracuse Nationals in 1951, and, as of 2025, he is the only former Dolphin to play in the NBA. Savage was selected as the most valuable player of the 1950 and 1951 Utica Optimist Club tournaments and named to the 1951 NCIT all-tournament team. He ended his collegiate career as Le Moyne's all-time leading scorer with 1,341 points in three varsity seasons. Dick Kenyon, who played varsity basketball for four years, surpassed Savage's career total in 1956, finishing with 1,378 points.

=== Glory era (1958–1969) ===
==== First two NCAA tournament berths (1958–1960) ====
The 1958–59 season marked the start of a golden era for Le Moyne Dolphins basketball. They appeared in seven of the 11 NCAA College Division tournaments between 1959 and 1969, reaching the Sweet 16 in 1959 and 1964.

The Dolphins were co-champions of the MECAA and made their first NCAA tournament appearance in 1959, ranked no. 20 nationally in the small college coaches poll. The Dolphins reached the Sweet 16, where they lost at Saint Michael's to finish the season 18–6. Junior Dick Lynch was unanimously named to the NCAA tournament All-Regional team and was also named to the All-MECAA first team for the second straight year. Senior Bob Hollembaek made the All-MECAA second team, and sophomore Chuck Sammons earned honorable mention. Dolphins head coach Tommy Niland was unanimously selected as 1959 MECAA coach of the year. Lynch also earned honorable mention on the Catholic All-America team.

The Dolphins won the MECAA championship outright and made their second straight NCAA tournament appearance in 1960. They lost the regional semifinal game to Saint Anselm and the regional third-place game to Assumption to finish 13–5. Le Moyne's head coach, Tommy Niland, was unanimously chosen as 1960 MECAA coach of the year. Niland was also named Catholic small college coach of the year. Dick Lynch was named a MECAA All-Star, a first-team Eastern College Athletic Conference (ECAC) small college All-Star and a second-team Catholic small college All-Star. John Caveny and Bill Stanley were both named All-MECAA second team. The 1959–60 Dolphins were inducted into the Le Moyne College Athletic Hall of Fame as a team in 2011.

==== MECAA tournament title and an on-campus home (1960–1963) ====
The MECA organized an in-season tournament in December 1960, hosted by Saint Peter's. The Dolphins defeated the host Peacocks, Iona and Long Island to win the tournament title. Bill Stanley had 18 points and 17 rebounds in the final and was named the tournament most valuable player.

The Dolphins had their 22-game home winning streak snapped by Saint Anselm, losing, 83–68, on January 6, 1961. The Dolphins' previous home loss had been a 65–50 drubbing at the hands of St. Bonaventure on February 5, 1958. In early January, Le Moyne was ranked no. 13 in the country among all Catholic schools, including both University Division and College Division institutions. However, the Dolphins fell out of the rankings after the loss to Saint Anselm.

Bill Stanley grabbed 22 rebounds to break his own program record and scored a game-high 24 points in the Dolphins 73–69 loss at Buffalo State on February 2, 1961.

The losses of Bill Stanley, the team's leading scorer and rebounder, and Chris Pitman, a key rotation player off the bench, to injuries was too much for the Dolphins to overcome down the stretch, and they lost four of their final six games, finishing 16–7 in collegiate contests. Stanley was unanimously named a 1961 MECAA All-Star. John Caveny and Tom Burns were named second-team MECAA All-Stars.

The Dolphins were 13–9 overall and 4–1 in MECAA play in 1961–62, winning their third conference championship. Bill Stanley was the 1962 MECAA most valuable player and Tommy Niland was the conference's coach of the year. It was the first time a Le Moyne player had earned a conference MVP award and the third MECAA coach of the year honor for Niland. It was Stanley's second straight MECAA All-Star selection. John Caveny was named to the MECAA All-Star second team.

The Dolphins' first game in their new Le Moyne Athletic Center was a 43–41 victory over archrival Siena on December 1, 1962.

The Dolphins suffered through a mid-season slump and finished the 1962–63 season with a 12–10 record in collegiate contests. Mickey Flynn was named All-MECAA first team.

==== Three straight NCAA tournament bids (1963–1966) ====
The Dolphins returned to the NCAA tournament in 1964, for the first time in four years. They entered the tournament as MECAA champions with a 4–1 league record and 17–5 overall and winners of five straight and 14 of their previous 15 games. The Dolphins had two victories over University Division opponents. Le Moyne defeated Youngstown State, ranked no. 6 in the College Division poll, in the regional semifinals, but lost in the Mideast Regional Final Sweet 16 game to Akron.

Tommy Niland was named 1964 MECAA coach of the year, the fourth time he was so honored, Gary DeYulia was named All-MECAA first team, and Tom Cooney was selected for the second team. DeYulia was also named an ECAC All-Star.

In April 1964, Le Moyne College announced that it would sponsor and participate in a four-team Christmas invitational basketball tournament to take place on December 29 and 30. The Dolphins won the tournament, and Gary DeYulia was named most valuable player.

During the 1964–65 season, the Dolphins had a 15-game winning streak that improved their record to 17–2. Le Moyne accepted a bid to host the Northeast Regionals of the 1965 NCAA College Division tournament. Dolphins head coach Tommy Niland was named tournament director for the regional.

In 1965, The Dolphins won their second straight MECAA championship with a 4–1 league record and entered the NCAA tournament 18–3, including 3–0 against University Division opponents. However, they lost to Assumption, 76–58, and dropped the regional third-place game to Hartwick, 70–68.

Gary DeYulia was named a 1965 ECAC first-team All-Star, received honorable mention for the 1965 Little All-America team and was honored as first-team All-MECAA. Tom Mullen was named second-team all-conference, and Tommy Niland won his fifth MECAA coach of the year award.

For the second straight season, the Dolphins hosted NCAA tournament regional games in 1966. Le Moyne entered the tournament 14–5, including two wins against University Division opponents, but lost their first-round game to Philadelphia Textile, 83–61. Le Moyne defeated Potsdam State in their consolation game, 86–63. Gary DeYulia had 25 points in the consolation game, giving him 51 for the two tournament games, and was named a Northeast Region Section B All-Star.

After the tournament, the Dolphins closed the regular-season with an 88–72 home victory over Siena to finish 16–6. Gary DeYulia finished his career with 1,212 points, third on Le Moyne's all-time scoring list.

Gary DeYulia was named 1966 MECAA player of the year. Tom Mullen was selected second-team all-MECAA. DeYulia was also named to the first-team small Catholic college all-America squad and to the small college all-America team and received honorable mention on the Little All-America squad.

==== A rebuilding year and two more NCAA tournament berths (1966–1969) ====
After struggling through an 11–10 season in 1966–67, the Dolphins regained their form and, led by captain Gerry McDermott, went 14–8 in 1967–68, including a trip to the NCAA tournament.

With Gerry McDermott slowed by an injury and able to play only limited minutes, Buffalo State used their size advantage to control the boards and defeat the Dolphins, 83–66, in the first round of the tournament. Tom Downey scored 13 points to lead Le Moyne. McDermott finished with eight points.

Northeastern defeated the Dolphins in the consolation game of the Northeast Region's Section B, 67–54. Senior Dave Cary came off the bench to score a season-high 21 points for Le Moyne. Gerry McDermott exacerbated his left heel injury in the Buffalo State game and did not play.

Gerry McDermott was named to the second team of the 1968 NCAA District 2 College Division All-Stars.

The Dolphins were 4–1 in MECAA play in 1968–69, and shared the conference championship with Saint Peter's.

The Dolphins received their second straight invitation to the NCAA tournament in 1969, the fifth time in six years they reached the tournament, and were selected to host the East Regionals. Matt Fallis had been suffering from an ankle injury but was able to play in the Dolphins' first-round game against Montclair State and finished with 12 points. However, Le Moyne fell to the Indians, 81–77. Chuck Brady scored a game-high 24 points for the Dolphins.

The Dolphins jumped all over Albany State (NY) in the regional third-place game and had a 20-point advantage early in the second half. However, the Great Danes fought back and took a 71–70 victory. Bob Bradley scored 24 points for the Dolphins and was named to the East Region all-tournament team. The Dolphins finished the season 15–8. They were 13–6 against College Division opponents and 2–2 versus University Division foes.

Tom Downey was named to the 1969 All-East Region first team by the National Association of Basketball Coaches (NABC).

=== Coach Niland's final years (1969–1973) ===
The Dolphins' 1969–70 season featured the debut of Phil Harlow, who would later become Le Moyne's all-time career scoring leader while still a junior.

After NCAA tournament bids in each of the previous two seasons, expectations were high, and the Dolphins were ranked no. 1 among Upstate New York small college teams in pre-season polling conducted by the Upstate Sports Information Directors Council. However, after a loss at Buffalo on February 21, dropped the Dolphins to 7–10 on the season, the team needed wins in its final four games to finish with a winning record. Victories over Ithaca, Saint Michael's, Cortland State, and Siena gave the Dolphins a four-game winning streak to close the season at 11–10. It was the 12th consecutive winning season and 18th straight non-losing season for the Dolphins. However, this was the first season since the NCAA split into the divisions in 1956, in which the Dolphins failed to earn a victory over a University Division opponent. Le Moyne was 11–6 against College Division teams and 0–4 versus University Division foes.

The Dolphins finished the 1970–71 season 9–12, their first losing record since 1951–52. Le Moyne was 1–4 against University Division opponents and 8–8 versus College Division foes.

Phil Harlow became Le Moyne's all-time leading career scorer on March 4, 1972. The Dolphins rebounded from their losing season and finished 13–10 in 1971–72.

On November 16, 1972, Le Moyne announced that Tommy Niland would resign as head coach at the end of the 1972–73 season, but would continue in his role as athletic director. Niland cited a desire to spend more time with his family as a reason for his decision. On December 19, Le Moyne announced that assistant coach Tom Cooney would succeed Niland. Cooney played for three seasons on Le Moyne's varsity team and was captain during the 1963–64 season. Prior to becoming Niland's assistant, Cooney was the head coach at St. Vincent de Paul High School in Syracuse for three seasons.

The Dolphins defeated St. Francis (NY) on February 6, 1973, improving to 9–5 overall and completing their conference slate with a perfect 5–0 record. The MECAA championship was the Dolphins' seventh league title.

Tommy Niland closed his coaching career with a 65–61 loss at archrival Siena on March 3, 1973. The Dolphins were 13–9 overall in his final season, and as of 2025, his 324 wins and seven NCAA tournament appearances both remain the most ever by a Le Moyne head coach. Phil Harlow scored 29 points in his final collegiate game to finish as Le Moyne's all-time leading scorer with 1,823 points.

=== Tom Cooney takes the reins (1973–1979) ===
Le Moyne became a Division II institution, when the College Division was split in 1973.

Tom Cooney earned his first head coaching victory in his second game at the helm, a 76–74 upset at Potsdam State on December 4, 1973.

Senior co-captain Rick May became the ninth player in program history to reach 1,000 career points and also became the first Le Moyne player to record 1,000 career rebounds during the 1973–74 season.

The Dolphins finished the 1973–74 season 14–10, on a four-game winning streak and with victories in seven of their final eight games. The Dolphins were 4–5 against teams that secured bids to the 1974 NCAA Division II tournament and 2–2 versus Division I foes.

After starting the 1974–75 season 0–4 and 3–8, the Dolphins rebounded to finish 14–11 and earned three victories over Division I opponents.

Jene Grey, who would finish as Le Moyne's second leading career scorer and rebounder, made his collegiate debut in the 1975–76 season. The Dolphins started the campaign 0–4, and did not win a road game until February. Le Moyne ended the season 12–12. Despite the troubling start, the Dolphins earned a home win against Gannon, ranked no. 4 in the NCAA Division II poll and defeated Division I Iona, their 60th all-time victory over a Division I/major program.

John Lauer was named to the 1976 ECAC Division II all-conference team and second-team Division II All-New York State. Lauer became the 11th player in program history to score 1,000 career points. Freshman Jene Grey received honorable mention ECAC Division II.

New NCAA rules regarding scheduling and conference membership effective in 1976, made continuation of the MECAA impractical, and the conference was dissolved. Le Moyne began competing as an independent, ending their 21 seasons in the conference with seven league championships.

Despite three starters missing time with injuries or illness, the 1976–77 Dolphins went 4–0 against Division I opponents. The Dolphins were 12–6 in mid February and on the short list of teams under consideration for an NCAA tournament berth. However, the 14–7 Dolphins were passed over by the NCAA tournament selectors. Le Moyne finished the season 15–7 and a perfect 11–0 at home. John Lauer finished his collegiate career fourth on Le Moyne's all-time scoring list. Pete Hogan finished as the sixth-highest scorer in Dolphins history.

The Dolphins' record reached its peak at 12–9 following a season-high five-game winning streak, but they lost four of their final five contests to finish the 1977–78 season 13–13.

With the Dolphins' record at 10–7 on February 11, 1979, head coach Tom Cooney informed his players that he was resigning effective at the end of the season. During halftime of their final home game of the season, Le Moyne athletic director Tommy Niland announced that Mike Lee would take over as the Dolphins' head coach at the conclusion of the season.

The Dolphins finished the 1978–79 season 14–10. Jene Grey finished with career totals of 1,729 points and 969 rebounds, both second in program history. Tom Cooney finished his head coaching career 82–63.

=== An Orangeman leads the Green and Gold (1979–1983) ===
Mike Lee, a former three-year starter and captain of the Syracuse Orangemen, led the Dolphins to their worst record in program history at 6–19 in 1979–80, his first season as head coach. Le Moyne followed up with an even worse record at 5–21 the following season.

Mike Lee's Dolphins improved in his third and fourth seasons, and he led Le Moyne to a winning record in his final campaign. Players recruited by Lee, including Wright Lassiter, Paul Galvin and Bobby Chestnut, would go on to play key roles on more successful Dolphin teams after Lee's departure.

Mike McDermott scored 24 points to become the 14th player in program history to score 1,000 points for his career in the Dolphins' 69–68 home loss against Bloomsburg State, ranked no. 11 in the Division II poll at the time, on February 10, 1982.

=== John Beilein era (1983–1992) ===
==== Building a tournament team (1983–1988) ====
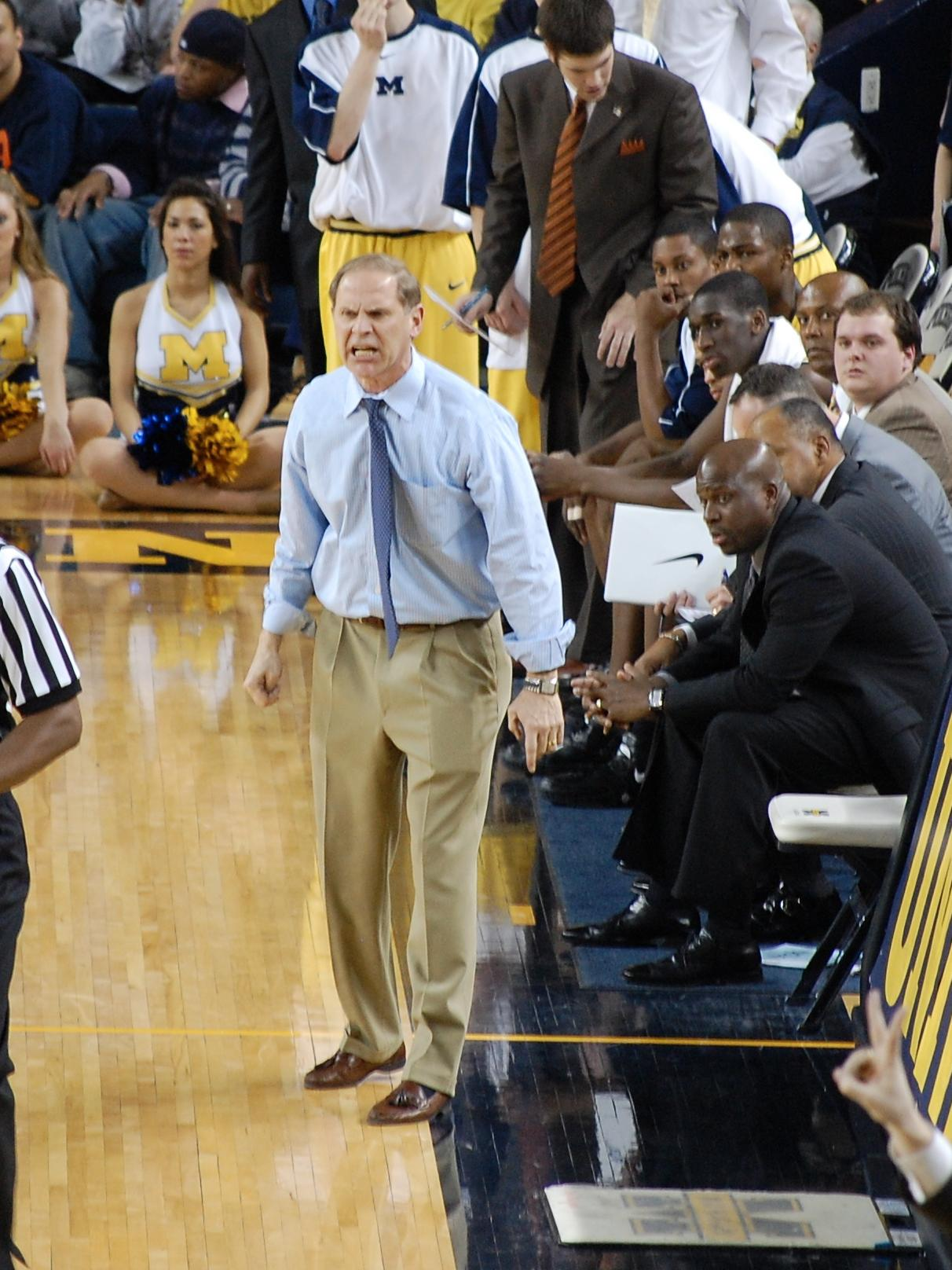
John Beilein in 2008

The Dolphins joined the Mideast Collegiate Conference (MECC) in John Beilein's first season and went undefeated in league play to win the conference regular-season championship. However, Le Moyne lost their MECC tournament semifinal game and were not selected for an at-large bid to the 1984 NCAA tournament. The 1983–84 season marked the first time in program history that the Dolphins won 20 games.

Scott Hicks and Pete Jerebko, both of whom would become Le Moyne Hall of Famers, arrived as freshmen in 1984. Despite a solid 19-win campaign in 1984–85, the Dolphins failed to earn an at-large berth to the NCAA tournament.

Wright Lassiter had a double-double with 17 points and 11 rebounds for the Dolphins and passed the 1,000 career points mark in Le Moyne's 78–75 double overtime loss to Philadelphia Textile on January 11, 1985. Bobby Chestnut scored 10 points to join Lassier in the 1,000-point club in the Dolphins' 74–62 loss at C.W. Post on January 27. Lassiter and Chestnut were named second-team All-MECC for the 1984–85 season. Lassiter was the league's leading rebounder at 9.7 per game. Pete Jerebko was named to the MECC's all-freshmen team. He was second in the conference in field-goal percentage at 61.9%, trailing teammate James Henderson, who hit at a 62.1% clip.

After a losing season marred by injuries, illness and suspensions, despite James Henderson reaching 1,000 career points and Pete Jerebko and Walter Hill being named 1986 second-team MECC All-Stars, Le Moyne bounced back with their second 20-win season in 1986–87. However, after falling in the MECC tournament, Le Moyne was not selected for an at-large bid to the 1987 NCAA tournament. Hill and Scott Hicks were named 1987 first-team all-MECC. James Henderson was named to the second team. Jerebko became the 20th player in program history with 1,000 career points in the Dolphins' 97–82 loss at St. Michael's on February 7, 1987.

Len Rauch, who would go on to finish his college career as Le Moyne's all-time leading scorer and rebounder, arrived for his freshmen season in 1987. Scott Hicks, Pete Jerebko and Rauch led the Dolphins to the regular-season co-championship of the MECC, the conference tournament title and a berth in the 1988 NCAA tournament.

After more than 11 years since the last meeting between the teams, the Dolphins renewed their rivalry with Division I Siena on December 5, 1987. Le Moyne suffered a difficult road loss, 75–70. Freshman Len Rauch led the Dolphins with 25 points and 14 rebounds. Scott Hicks scored 12 points for Le Moyne, surpassing 1,000 points for his career.

Following a 78–71 road win at Philadelphia Textile, which improved the Dolphins' record to 17–4 overall and 6–1 in MECC play, Le Moyne was ranked no. 16 in the NCAA Division II poll on February 15, 1988. It was the Dolphins' first appearance in a major poll since finishing the 1964–65 season no. 14 in the United Press International (UPI) small college coaches poll.

The Dolphins lost in the first round of the 1988 NCAA tournament to California (PA) but rebounded to defeat Kutztown in the regional third-place game.

The team's 24 wins in 1987–88 were the most in program history up to that point. John Beilein was named 1988 MECC coach of the year. Pete Jerebko was selected as MECC player of the year and senior of the year. Len Rauch was MECC freshman of the year. Scott Hicks joined Jerebko on all-MECC first team. Rauch was second-team all-MECC. The 1987–88 Dolphins were inducted into the Le Moyne College Athletic Hall of Fame as a team in 2017.

==== Sustained winning and Len Rauch (1988–1992) ====
The Dolphins followed up their return to the NCAA tournament with four straight winning campaigns, but inconsistent play kept them out of the postseason. Len Rauch starred during his final three seasons, becoming Le Moyne's all-time leading career scorer and rebounder but feuded with head coach John Beilein. Rauch had three triple-doubles during his final three seasons, giving him all of the four triple-doubles ever recorded by a Dolphin.

The Dolphins started the 1988–89 season 5–8, but won 10 of their next 12 games to improve to 15–10. Key wins during the run came against Gannon, ranked no. 12 in Division II, and Army. The Dolphins had lost 18 straight games versus Division I opponents, a streak that began in 1977. The Dolphins' 77–70 victory on February 7, 1989, at West Point would ultimately prove to be the final time Le Moyne defeated a Division I team as a Division II program.

The Dolphins lost their 1989 MECC quarterfinal game at Pace, 79–61, on March 4. Len Rauch was the 1989 MECC sophomore of the year and named to the Division II All-East team by the NABC.

The 1989–90 season was the last under the leadership of Tommy Niland, Le Moyne's athletic director since 1947, and the head basketball coach for the program's first 25 varsity seasons. In January 1990, long-time Le Moyne baseball coach Dick Rockwell was chosen as Niland's successor.

The Dolphins lost their 1990 MECC semifinal game at Gannon on March 9, 55–53. The Dolphins also lost the tournament third-place game and finished their season 17–12. Len Rauch was named 1990 first-team All-MECC, and Tom Herhusky was named to the second team. During the 1989–90 season, Russell Barnes surpassed 1,000 points for his collegiate career.

As the no. 3 seed in the 1991 MECC tournament, the Dolphins defeated Mercyhurst, 86–58, in the MECC quarterfinals. Len Rauch passed the 500-career-assist threshold in the contest. Le Moyne fell to Pace, 87–68, in their semifinal game on March 8. The Dolphins completed their season with an 86–84 overtime loss to Gannon in the tournament consolation game, finishing 19–10.

Len Rauch was named third-team Division II All-America, the first player in program history to be named an All-American by the NABC, and All-East District II second team. Rauch was also 1991 MECC player of the year and first-team All-MECC. Joe Girard was MECC rookie of the year. Tom Herhusky was second-team All-MECC.

Following the dissolution of the MECC, the Dolphins played the 1991–92 season as an independent and committed to join the New England Collegiate Conference (NECC) in 1992.

After starting the season 8–11, the Dolphins won their final seven games to finish the campaign 15–11. Freshman Mike Montesano, a future Le Moyne Hall of Famer, was named 1992 ECAC Division II co-rookie of the year.

On April 9, 1992, John Beilein stepped down as head coach of the Dolphins to take the same position at Canisius. In nine years at Le Moyne, Beilein finished 163–94. His .634 winning percentage was the best for any Dolphins head coach up to that point.

=== Hicks is first Dolphin to play and coach in NCAA tournament (1992–1997) ===
The Dolphins hired Scott Hicks as their new head coach on May 22, 1992, as they prepared for their first season as a member of the NECC. Hicks was the youngest men's basketball head coach across the NCAA's three divisions during each of his first two seasons at the helm.

Chris Granozio and Don Familo, both 1986 Le Moyne graduates, replaced Peter Stoyan calling Dolphins games on the radio in 1992. Granozio handled play-by-play, and Familo provided the color on WVOA-FM. As of 2025, the two Le Moyne Athletic Hall of Famers remain the voices of Dolphins basketball on radio, and, since 2023, their audio feed has been simulcast with the video of Le Moyne's home games on NEC Front Row, the Northeast Conference's streaming platform.

Le Moyne's athletic programs moved to the Northeast-10 Conference (NE10) starting with the 1996–97 academic year. The Dolphins won their final tournament as a NECC member in 1996, and their first NE10 tournament in 1997, earning automatic bids to the NCAA tournament each year. The Dolphins were eliminated in the first round of both NCAA tournaments.

The Dolphins' run to the 1997 NE10 tournament title and NCAA tournament appearance came as a Cinderella. Le Moyne finished the regular season 10–16 overall and 7–11 in NE10 play, earning the no. 7 seed in the conference tournament. The Dolphins upset the no. 2 seed on the road in the quarterfinals and the no. 3 seed in the semifinals, before beating the no. 4 seed in the final. Le Moyne was the only club in the field of 48 NCAA tournament teams with a losing record. The Dolphins' quick exit from the NCAA tournament closed out the first losing campaign for head coach Scott Hicks and the first for the program since the 1985–86 season.

The Dolphins were picked seventh in the 1992–93 pre-season NECC coaches poll but earned the no. 3 seed in the NECC tournament and home-court advantage for their quarterfinal game. After opening the tournament with a win over Sacred Heat, the Dolphins suffered a two-point loss in the NECC semifinals and finished the season 18–10.

Before the start of the 1993–94 season, Le Moyne announced that six unnamed male athletes would be suspended from competition for gambling on major college sporting events. The NCAA approved Le Moyne's remediation plan and granted reinstatement to all six. The names of and sports played by the suspended athletes were not disclosed, but Adam Stockwell missed the first seven games of the campaign, and Mike Montesano was not in the lineup for the first eight.

Despite a solid regular season, the Dolphins' 1993–94 campaign ended with an 87–79 home loss to Massachusetts Lowell, a team they had beaten twice in the regular season, in the NECC quarterfinals.

The Dolphins were 21–5, 16–4 in NECC play, tied for second place in the league in 1995–96, entering the conference tournament as the no. 3 seed. Le Moyne's signature win was a 77–69 home triumph over New Hampshire College, ranked no. 18 in the NCAA Division II poll, on January 21. Keith Moyer, pressed into duty after starting point guard Rob Atene fouled out with 3:42 to play, ran the offense and scored six points in the closing minutes to secure the victory. Freshman center John Tomsich finished with eight points, 11 rebounds, two assists, four blocked shots and a steal. Adam Stockwell scored 21 points and dished out six assists. Dan Drews added 18 points and seven rebounds.

After escaping their 1996 NECC quarterfinal game with an overtime win over Albany (NY), the Dolphins used a late run to put away New Hampshire College in the semifinals on March 1. The Dolphins defeated Southern Connecticut in the NECC final, 77–73, on March 2, led by Dave Ingram, who scored 19 points and was named the tournament's most valuable player. In the 1996 NCAA tournament, Le Moyne fell to Franklin Pierce in the first round. The 1995–96 Dolphins were inducted into the Le Moyne College Athletic Hall of Fame as a team in 2025.

During the head coaching tenure of Scott Hicks, six Dolphins surpassed 1,000 career points scored: John Haas, Christian Buchholz, Joe Girard, Dan Sandel, Mike Montesano and Adam Stockwell. Haas also topped 500 career assists. In Haas's assist-milestone game, the Dolphins set new program records for free throws made and attempted, going 42 for 50 from the line.

Mike Montesano was named 1993 second-team All-NECC. Dan Sandel finished 11th in rebounding in Division II for the season with an average of 10.5 per game. The Dolphins were second in free-throw shooting in Division II, connecting on 75.6% of their charity tosses.

Dan Sandel was named 1994 first-team All-NECC, and Mike Montesano was named to the second team. Joe Girard was named 1994 first-team District I Academic All-America in February and National Academic All-America in March 1994.

Mike Montesano scored 35 points in the Dolphins' 1995 NECC quarterfinal victory and was named to the all-tournament team. He was also named 1995 first-team All-NECC, second-team Division II All-District for the Northeast Region, and second-team Division II All-American.

Adam Stockwell was named 1996 first-team All-NECC, first-team District I Academic All-American, first-team All-ECAC Division II North and All-Northeast Region.

In May 1997, Scott Hicks resigned as the Dolphins' head coach to take the same position at Albany (NY), which was planning to transition to Division I. Hicks was 87–56 in his five years at Le Moyne.

=== Dave Paulsen brings a new approach (1997–2000) ===
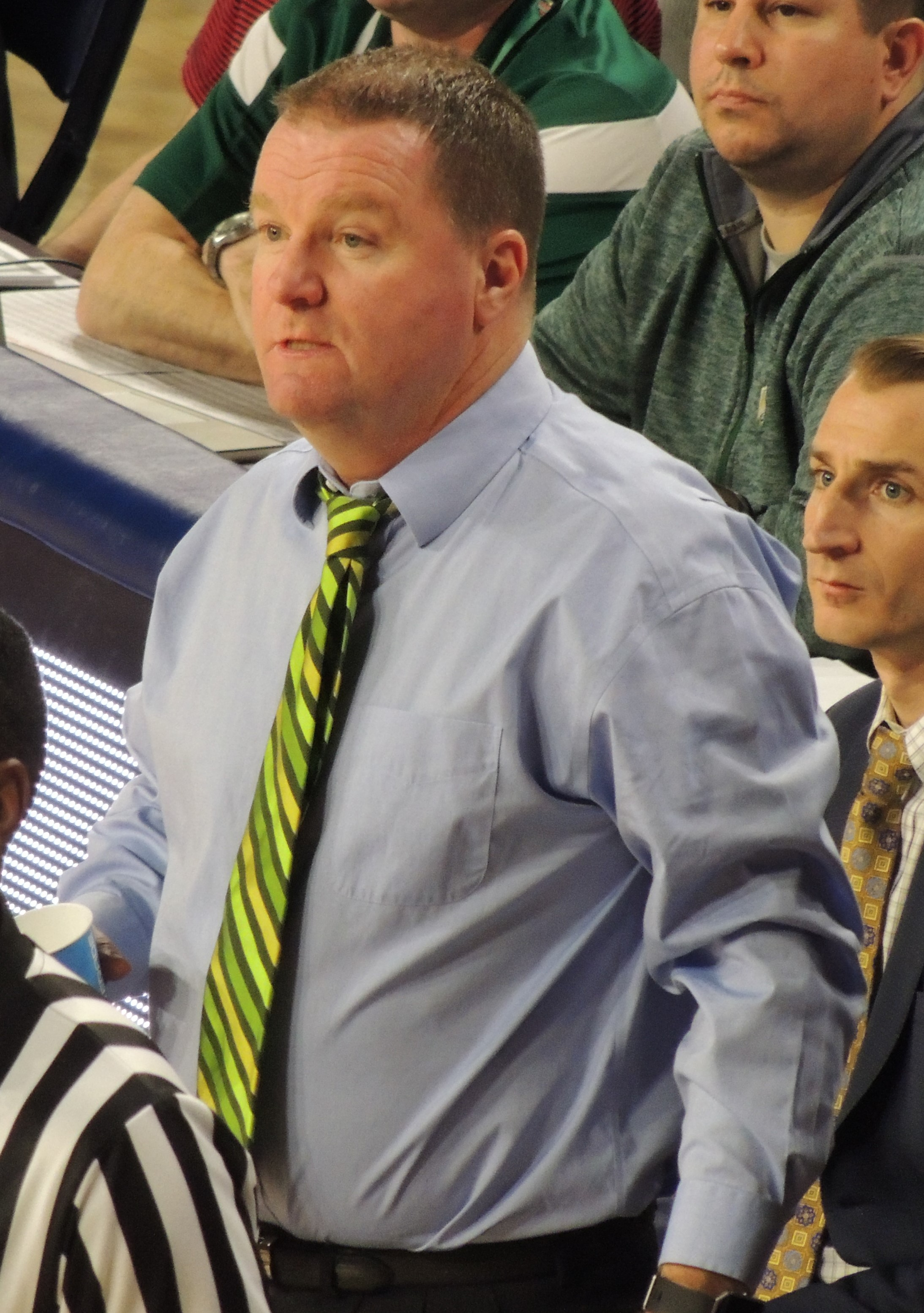
Dave Paulsen

On June 18, 1997, Le Moyne introduced Dave Paulsen as the Dolphins' new head coach. Assistant coaches Gallagher Driscoll and Sean McDonnell committed to remain on Paulsen's staff. Jim "Duke" McGrath, a Le Moyne alumnus from the class of 1962, joined the staff as a volunteer assistant coach. Tobin Anderson was also added to the staff as an assistant coach.

The Dolphins went on a foreign tour to London between August 9 and 19, 1997. Le Moyne played three teams from the British Basketball League, losing all three games, and earned a win against an amateur club team.

The Dolphins entered the 1998 NE10 tournament 19–7, having won both of their games against ranked Division II opponents. Nevertheless, the Dolphins had lost, 87–82, at NAIA Division I Roberts Wesleyan on February 11, despite a 31-point, 12-rebound effort from John Tomsich. The Raiders improved to 10–16 with the win, which likely damaged Le Moyne's chances for an at-large bid to the NCAA tournament.

The Dolphins finished tied for second place in the NE10 and were the no. 3 seed in the 1998 NE10 tournament and hosted no. 6 seed Saint Michael's in a quarterfinal game on February 23. The well rested Dolphins defeated the Purple Knights, 101–93. John Tomsich had a double-double for Le Moyne wth 29 points and 10 rebounds. The win, Le Moyne's 20th of the season, improved the Dolphins' home record to 16–0 in 1997–98, and was their 17th straight victory at the Henninger Athletic Center dating back to the 1996–97 campaign.

The Dolphins fell, 102–84, on the road to no. 2 seed Assumption in the NE10 semifinals on February 25. The Dolphins finished the season 20–8, reaching the 20-win plateau for the fifth time in the 50-year history of the program, all of which occurred during the most recent 15 seasons.

John Tomsich was named 1998 first-team All-NE10 and to the Division II All-Northeast Region team. Tomsich passed 1,000 career points scored during the season. Keith Moyer led the NE10 in assists per game with 7.7, which ranked him seventh in Division II.

Effective for the 1998–99 academic year, Le Moyne instituted a random drug testing program for all student-athletes. Le Moyne planned to apply for membership in the Metro Atlantic Athletic Conference (MAAC) and transition to Division I, where drug testing was required.

The Dolphins' 18-game home winning streak was snapped, when they lost to East Stroudsburg, 74–73, on November 21, 1998. John Tomsich scored 27 points, grabbed 16 rebounds and blocked two shots to lead Le Moyne.

Kevin Moyer scored 29 points and dished nine assists, leading the Dolphins to an 85–83 upset victory at Saint Anselm, ranked no. 15 in the NCAA Division II Bulletin poll, on January 11, 1999. This was the final game of eight consecutive contests, five of them true road games, the Dolphins played away from home. Le Moyne went 34 days between home games and spent about 40 hours traveling 2,820 miles to play games in six different states. The Dolphins won five of the eight games on the road trip.

John Tomsich scored 39 points, the most by a Le Moyne player in 28 years, and grabbed 13 rebounds in a 73–63 victory over Bryant on January 18. Tomisch was 11 for 18 from the field. The rest of the team shot 10 for 29 (34%). The Dolphins reached a season-high seven games above .500 at 12–5 overall and 7–2 in NE10 play. After Saint Michael's lost at Pace two days later, the Dolphins and Purple Knights were tied for first place in the NE10. However, Le Moyne fell out of first place with a 67–62 upset loss on January 23, at American International, who had entered the game 1–8 in NE10 play.

The Dolphins regained a share of first place with a 75–73 home victory over Saint Michael's on January 27. Five days later, the Dolphins had a 65–59 lead with 5:20 to play in their game at Stonehill. The Chieftains closed the game on a 17–8 run and earned a 76–73 win, ending their six-game losing streak and handing Le Moyne their second straight loss, which knocked the Dolphins out of a first-place tie.

Playing at home in their February 19 regular-season finale, the Dolphins fell to Pace, the top ranked team in the Northeast Region, 85–72. The loss was the seventh straight for Le Moyne, dropping them to 8–10 in NE10 play, tied for sixth place in the league. Just 18 days earlier, they took the court tied for first place. The Dolphins won the tiebreaker for the no. 6 seed in the conference tournament.

The Dolphins' epic collapse concluded with their eighth straight loss despite a valiant effort in the NE10 quarterfinals at no. 3 seed Saint Michael's on February 22. With John Tomsich slowed by flu-like symptoms, Le Moyne managed a 10-point lead with 9:48 to play. The Purple Knights went on a run and secured a 61–59 victory. Tomsich was limited to six points on 2-for-10 shooting from the floor, eight rebounds and four assists in his final collegiate game. He finished his career with 1,760 points, third in program history, and 1,015 rebounds, also third all-time. The Dolphins finished their season 13–14 overall. The season-ending losing streak was the longest for Le Moyne since dropping 13 straight during the 1980–81 season.

John Tomisch was named 1999 NE10 defensive player of the year and first-team All-NE10. Tomsich also repeated as first-team Division II All-Northeast Region and was named a second-team Division II All-American. Tomisch ranked seventh in Division II in blocked shots with 264. Kevin Moyer's 179 assists were the fifth best single-season total in program history.

On November 20, 1999, the Dolphins upset California (PA), ranked no. 11 in the NCAA Division II Bulletin preseason poll, 75–65 in overtime, to win the Buzz Ridl Classic. Freshman Dwayne Pean converted a three-point play with 32 seconds left that knotted the score and forced the extra session. The Dolphins dominated play after regulation, outscoring California, 14–4, getting seven of their points from freshman Kyle Chapman. Myles Howard led Le Moyne with a game-high 24 points and was named the tournament's most valuable player.

Le Moyne hosted a multi-team event for the first time in six years on December 29 and 30. The event was an unbracketed showcase promoted as the inaugural Holiday Inn Invitational. During warmups for the Dolphins' game against Southampton, ranked no. 4 in the Northeast Region of Division II, the Colonials gathered at the center-court logo, and their center, Mark Person, shouted, "This is our house!" as his teammates jumped up and down, clapping their hands. The Dolphins sat quietly on their bench and watched. The game was tight, until Michael Culley came off the bench and drained three triples in just over two minutes, putting Le Moyne ahead, 27–19. The Dolphins went on to win, 101–87.

Michael Culley surpassed 1,000 career points in the Dolphins' 74–66 loss in their NE10 home opener against Pace on January 6, 2000. Although Le Moyne successfully slowed Pace's high-octane offense, which was averaging nearly 100 points per game, the Dolphins shot only 43% from the floor. Le Moyne's frustration was evident, when Kyle Chapman threw an errant inbounds pass that was caught by Dolphins head coach Dave Paulsen, who hurled it toward the gym exit.

Two days after setting a new mark for most points allowed in a home game in a 105–77 loss to Merrimack, the Dolphins surrendered even more points and suffered the worst home loss in program history, 108–66, to Saint Anselm on January 10. The loss was the 13th straight in conference regular-season play and third straight overall for the Dolphins, who fell to 6–7 overall and 0–6 in NE10 play.

The Dolphins ended losing streaks of five games overall, 15 straight in conference regular-season play and 16 in a row against NE10 foes with a 74–71 home win on January 22, against American International, the team with the best overall record in the league. Le Moyne's most recent win against an NE10 opponent had been at home against Saint Michael's on January 27, 1999, a victory that had put the Dolphins into a first-place tie in the league.

The Dolphins were officially eliminated from contention for a berth in the 2000 NE10 tournament after an 82–67 loss at Merrimack on February 7.

The Dolphins lost their season finale, 90–82, at home to Saint Michael's on February 23. Michael Culley had a team-high 17 points in his final collegiate game. He finished as Le Moyne's all-time leader in career three-point field goals with 305. The loss was the third straight for the Dolphins and their 13th in 16 games, leaving them 9–17 overall and 2–16 in NE10 play, last in the conference standings.

On July 4, 2000, Dolphins head coach Dave Paulsen resigned to take the head coaching position at his alma mater, Division III Williams.

=== Steve Evans era (2000–2015) ===
Le Moyne introduced Steve Evans as their new men's basketball head coach on August 4, 2000, replacing the departed Dave Paulsen. Evans had previously served as a Dolphins assistant under Scott Hicks from 1994 to 1996. He left Le Moyne for an assistant coach position at Division I Siena. After three years, he moved on to Northwestern, where he worked as an assistant during the 1999–2000 season. While working as a part-time assistant at Le Moyne, Evans was elected as the youngest city council member in the history of the city of Rome, New York. Evans, 29 years old at the time of his hiring, was a four-year starter and senior-year captain at Union (NY) and graduated from the school in 1994.

There were about 60 applicants for the vacant head coaching position. Once the search committee narrowed the field to five candidates, they were all interviewed at Le Moyne on August 1. Aside from Steve Evans, the four other finalists were Le Moyne assistant Sean McDonnell, Kevin Broderick, who was the head coach at Oswego State and endorsed by former Dolphins head coach John Beilein, Tom Spanbauer, head coach at Cortland State, and Walt Townes, an assistant at Rutgers.

The Dolphins lost five seniors to graduation in 2000. Juniors Steve Vega and Tom Patton, sophomores Kyle Chapman and Jamar Hubbard and redshirt freshman Brett Barnard all returned for the 2000–01 season. Five players decided to leave the team at the end of the previous season. Jakub Hrabovský returned to his native Czech Republic for an educational opportunity, leaving Le Moyne with no seniors. Dwayne Pean and Chip James left to be closer to their homes. Pean transferred to Barton. Myles Howard withdrew from Le Moyne with plans to pursue a football career. Howard continued his basketball career instead after transferring to Alcorn State. Nick Redhead transferred to Clarkson. Former head coach Dave Paulsen knew early on that the Dolphins would need a large recruiting class. Rob Thorpe, a 5'11" point guard from Vernon-Verona-Sherrill, made a verbal commitment to play at Le Moyne in September 1999. Brendan Bayly, a 6'10" center from Averill Park, and Al Drechsler, a 6'7" small forward from Greece Athena, also committed during the fall of 1999. Chris Henry, a 6'4" forward from Fayetteville–Manlius, signed in May 2000. Henry averaged 18 points and eight rebounds as a high school senior and was third-team All-Central New York. Jason Coleman, a 6'1" point guard from Bishop Maginn High School, who was first-team All-Greater Albany, signed in the spring along with Jamie McArdle, a 6'6" small forward, who was third-team All-Greater Rochester. Rashad Richards, a 6'4" forward from Corcoran, who was first-team All-Central New York, averaging 19.2 points, 15 rebounds and two assists per game as a high school senior, signed with the Dolphins in May, but redshirted his freshman year. Brian Robertson, a 6'4" shooting guard, was the final freshman to sign. Le Moyne was the youngest team in the NCAA during the 2000–01 season. Chris Jacobs, formerly an administrative assistant at Northwestern, and Jeff "Spud" Collins, formerly an assistant at Archbishop Alter High School, in Kettering, Ohio, joined the staff as assistant coaches.

Head coach Steve Evans planned to play a pressing, up-tempo style and use a deep rotation with every player on the roster getting significant playing time. Evans expected that good conditioning and keeping players fresh would give the Dolphins an advantage in the closing minutes of games. Le Moyne, with a roster comprising eight freshmen (including one who redshirted the previous season), two sophomores and two juniors, was picked to finish last in a preseason poll of the league's coaches.

The Dolphins opened their season with a 91–70 loss to Binghamton, in the opener of the Susse Chalet Bryant Basketball Classic on November 18. Le Moyne trailed by only five points at the break but surrendered a 14–4 run midway through the second half. The Dolphins were outrebounded, 43–20. Kyle Champman and Brett Barnard each scored 12 points to lead Le Moyne. Steve Vega added six points and three assists.

The following day, the Dolphins earned the first career win for head coach Steve Evans with a 93–83 victory over Puerto Rico–Río Piedras in the consolation game of the Bryant tournament. Kyle Chapman scored 24 points to lead Le Moyne. The Dolphins improved their rebounding and had a 45–40 advantage on the boards. Jamie McArdle and Brendan Bayly each grabbed a team-high seven rebounds, and McArdle added 14 points. Steve Vega had 10 points and five assists.

The Dolphins suffered a 51-point defeat, the worst in program history, at Saint Anselm, 117–66, on November 26, 2000. The 117 points Le Moyne allowed was the most in program history. The Dolphins were held to 29% shooting from the field and were led by Tom Patton and Jamie McArdle, who scored 12 points each.

The Dolphins played their home opener on November 29, at the Onondaga County War Memorial, their first home game there since the 1978–79 season, as part of the festivities for the Tribute to Danny Biasone, the leading advocate for the shot clock, which the NBA ultimately adopted, while Biasone was the owner of the Syracuse Nationals. The event was organized by former Nationals star Dolph Schayes and attended by several of his former teammates, including Earl Lloyd, the first African American to play in the NBA. Biasone and Tommy Niland, longtime Dolphins head coach, were good friends, and Biasone willed to Le Moyne the actual shot clock he used for a 1954 demonstration for NBA officials. Le Moyne kept the shot clock and other Biasone memorabilia on display in the Danny Biasone Room inside the Henninger Athletic Center. The Dolphins lost the game to Bentley, 104–75. Tom Patton scored 17 points to lead Le Moyne. Jason Coleman had 13 points and six rebounds, and Brendan Bayly added seven points and six rebounds. Kyle Chapman chipped in four points and nine assists for the Dolphins, who fell to 1–3 overall and 0–2 in NE10 play.

The Dolphins' streak of four straight wins against ranked Division II opponents ended with a 95–83 home loss to Saint Michael's, ranked no. 25 in the NCAA Division II Bulletin poll, on December 9. In comparison with their recent blowout losses, Le Moyne's performance was encouraging. The Dolphins kept the game close, until the Purple Knights went on a run with about 13 minutes to play. During two spurts that consumed nine minutes, Saint Michael's outscored Le Moyne, 28–5. The Dolphins had a 78–67 advantage over the remaining 31 minutes of play. Brett Barnard scored 17 points and grabbed seven rebounds to lead Le Moyne. Steve Vega also had 17 points for the Dolphins. Jason Coleman added six points and five assists. Le Moyne's most recent loss against a ranked Division II opponent had been in the 1997 NCAA tournament. The loss was the fifth straight for the Dolphins, all against conference opponents, dropping them to 1–6 overall and 0–5 in NE10 play.

Le Moyne hosted the Holiday Inn Carrier Circle Classic on December 29 and 30. In the opening round, the Dolphins defeated Southern Vermont, 96–66. Le Moyne held the Mountaineers to 34% shooting from the floor. Kyle Chapman led six Dolphins in double figures with 13 points. Brett Barnard scored 12 points and grabbed six rebounds, and Chris Henry added 10 points and six rebounds.

In the tournament final, the Dolphins' defense overwhelmed Hartwick, and Le Moyne cruised to a 90–65 victory. The Dolphins held the Hawks to 34% shooting from the field and blocked 13 Hartwick shots. With the score tied at 15, Le Moyne went on a 40–13 run that culminated with scoring the first 14 points of the second half, putting the game out of reach. Jamie McArdle scored a career-high 18 points and grabbed eight rebounds, earning tournament most valuable player honors. Rob Thorpe scored two points and had a game-high seven assists for the Dolphins. Kyle Chapman and Brett Barnard joined McArdle on the all-tournament team. Chapman had 11 points, and Barnard scored nine in the final.

Freshman point guard Jason Coleman caught an outlet pass off a missed New Hampshire College free throw, drove to the basket and converted a three-point play to give the Dolphins a 73–70 lead with three seconds to play at Ted Grant Court on January 22, 2001. Coleman then stole the Penmen's inbounds pass and secured a victory that ended Le Moyne's seven-game losing streak. The Dolphins had a seven-point lead in the second half but fell behind by four with six minutes to play. Le Moyne battled back and tied the score at 65 with 3:30 remaining, and neither team led by more than two points, until Coleman's free throw in the closing seconds. Kyle Chapman scored 23 points and grabbed eight rebounds to lead the Dolphins in his return from a two-game absence with the flu. Coleman finished with 10 points and six assists. Le Moyne improved to 4–13 overall and 1–12 in NE10 play.

After a double overtime loss to Assumption in which Le Moyne had three-point leads in the final minute of both regulation and the first overtime, the Dolphins called a players-only meeting led by sophomore Kyle Chapman. Le Moyne raced to a 16–2 lead in their February 13 home game against American International and built their advantage to 19 points in the second half. The Yellow Jackets battled back, cutting the deficit to five points with a minute to play. The Dolphins went 8 for 10 from the free-throw line down the stretch to secure an 81–70 victory, ending their five-game losing streak. Chapman led the way with his first double-double of the season, scoring 23 points, grabbing 13 rebounds and dishing four assists. The Dolphins improved to 5–18 overall and 2–17 in NE10 play.

The Dolphins wrapped up their season with an 80–66 home loss to Southern Connecticut on February 21. Tom Patton scored 15 points to lead Le Moyne. Jamie McArdle added 13 points and nine rebounds, and Jason Coleman had nine points and seven assists for Le Moyne. The Dolphins finished 5–21 overall and 2–20, last place in the NE10. The Dolphins' record matched that of the 1980–81 team for the worst in program history.

Since the Dolphins had no seniors the previous season, there were no players lost to graduation in 2001. Senior Tom Patton, redshirt sophomore Brett Barnard and sophomores Brendan Bayly, Jason Coleman, Al Drechsler, Chris Henry, Jamie McArdle, Brian Robertson and Rob Thorpe all returned. Steve Vega transferred to Clarkson for his senior season. Kyle Chapman did not return for his junior season and transferred to Oakland. Jamar Hubbard was granted a release from his scholarship after the previous season. Rashad Richards, who redshirted as a freshman the previous season, transferred to Onondaga Community College, after becoming academically ineligible to play for Le Moyne. Thorpe considered transferring after the previous season, but head coach Steve Evans convinced him and his parents that he would be an integral part of Le Moyne's future. Patton suffered a broken hand that sidelined him at the start of the season. He would appear in only five games before exiting the team in January 2002.

In December 2000, Tom Femminella, a 5'10" shooting guard, passed up at least three Division I offers and signed a letter of intent with Le Moyne. Femminella averaged 24 points and seven assists per game as a junior at Massapequa High School. Darko Sedlar, a 6'6" Croatian forward, who played at Columbia High School, signed with Le Moyne in May 2001. Flagan Prince, who had never played high school basketball but was impressive at Mohawk Valley Community College from 1998 to 2000, was a teammate of Rob Thorpe on the Central New York squad at the 2001 Empire State Games. Prince had not graduated, when his junior college eligibility ran out a year earlier, but he had recently completed his associate's degree. Prince had Division II offers, including one from Le Moyne, but told the media he would not make a decision until after the Games, hoping to get a Division I opportunity. In August, Prince, a 6'6" small forward, signed with the Dolphins as a junior transfer. Prince had averaged 19 points per game during his second season at Mohawk Valley. John Healy, a 6'9" walk-on freshman center, joined the team. Head coach Steve Evans said that Thorpe and Jason Coleman would no longer split time at point guard. He named Thorpe the starter and said Coleman would come off the bench for offensive punch, taking advantage of his ability to create off the dribble.

Rob Thorpe's three-pointer with three seconds to play in overtime provided the winning margin in the Dolphins' 92–89 victory at Stonehill on December 4, 2001. Thorpe was 5 for 9 from beyond the arc and finished with 15 points, six assists and two steals. Brett Barnard led Le Moyne with 22 points and five blocked shots. Jason Coleman added 15 points and two steals for the Dolphins, and Flagan Prince had 14 points and seven rebounds. This was Le Moyne's first road win against a conference opponent since January 11, 1999. The Dolphins had lost 25 consecutive conference regular-season road games and 26 straight road games versus conference opponents overall. With their second straight overtime win, Le Moyne improved to 3–2 overall and 2–2 in NE10 play.

After falling behind early by 13 points at Saint Michael's on December 8, the Dolphins surged ahead, fueled by 23 first-half points scored by Jason Coleman. By intermission, Le Moyne had a four-point lead, and they cruised to an 82–65 victory. Coleman finished with 32 points, shooting 12 for 21 from the field and 6 for 10 from three-point range, and added two steals. The Dolphins shot 53% from the floor, while holding the Purple Knights to 29%. It was the first road win for Le Moyne at Saint Michael's since January 8, 1985, breaking their 12-game losing streak there. The win gave the Dolphins their first three-game conference winning streak since January 1999. Jamie McArdle and Darko Sedlar each grabbed six rebounds for Le Moyne, and McArdle added 13 points and two steals. Rob Thorpe scored 11 points, dished five assists and had two steals, and Flagan Prince finished with 14 points. The Dolphins improved to 4–2 overall and 3–2 in NE10 play. Le Moyne was ranked no. 7 in the NCAA Division II Northeast Region poll on December 10.

After a 10-point home loss to Saint Rose in which Le Moyne shot 35% from the floor and 36% from the free-throw line, the Dolphins opened the Le Moyne College Holiday Tournament on December 28, with a 70–55 win over Alfred. Flagan Prince had a double-double with 19 points and 10 rebounds, and Rob Thorpe had 16 points and four steals to lead Le Moyne. The following day, Prince had his third straight double-double with 24 points and 10 rebounds to earn the tournament most valuable player award and lead the Dolphins to an 86–78 win over Roberts Wesleyan in the title game. Brett Barnard also had a double-double for Le Moyne with 21 points and 11 rebounds. Rob Thorpe scored eight points and dished 13 assists. Barnard and Thorpe joined Prince on the all-tournament team.

The Dolphins lost their fifth straight game and sixth consecutive NE10 contest, when they fell at home to Bentley, 80–77, on January 12, 2002. Le Moyne sprinted to an early 20–5 lead but trailed by a point at intermission. Flagan Prince had a double-double with 19 points, 10 rebounds and two blocks for the Dolphins. Rob Thorpe added 16 points, eight assists and three steals. Jason Coleman shot 4 for 7 from three-point range and finished with 15 points for Le Moyne. The Dolphins fell to 6–8 overall and 3–8 in NE10 play.

The Dolphins used a 16–0 run over a span of five minutes to erase an 11-point deficit and cruised over the game's final 10 minutes to a 77–62 win at Merrimack on January 15. Le Moyne, who entered the game shooting just 61% from the free-throw line on the season, hit 20 of their 22 charity tosses. Freshman Darko Sedlar scored 19 points, shooting 2 for 3 from three-point range, to lead the Dolphins. Rob Thorpe added 17 points, all in the second half, and three steals. Brendan Bayly had a double-double off the bench with 16 points and 12 rebounds for Le Moyne.

Brett Barnard and Jason Coleman scored 15 points apiece, leading the Dolphins to a 79–62 home win over Saint Michael's on February 2. Sophomore point guard Rob Thorpe added 11 points, six assists and a career-high six rebounds for Le Moyne. The Dolphins improved to 11–10 overall and 7–10 in NE10 play.

The Dolphins closed the regular season with a fifth consecutive loss, falling 93–81 in overtime at Southern Connecticut on February 20. Brett Barnard scored 14 points to lead Le Moyne, who dropped to 11–15 overall and 7–15 in NE10 play, finishing tied for 11th place in the league with Saint Michael's. The Dolphins swept their two regular-season games against Saint Michael's to earn the no. 11 seed in the 12-team conference tournament.

The Dolphins' season ended with an 81–63 loss in the first round of the NE10 tournament at Saint Anselm on February 23. The Hawks used a 10–0 run early in the first half to build an eight-point lead at intermission. Le Moyne got within six points with just over 11 minutes to play, but Saint Anselm seized control of the game the rest of the way. Brett Barnard scored 15 points and grabbed seven rebounds to lead the Dolphins. Rob Thorpe added 15 points and five assists, and Jason Coleman had three points and three steals for Le Moyne.

Brett Barnard led Division II in field-goal accuracy in 2001–02 at 66.8%.

Tom Patton, who had left the team prior to the end of the previous season, was the only senior lost to graduation in 2002. Senior Flagan Prince, redshirt junior Brett Barnard, juniors Rob Thorpe, Chris Henry, Brendan Bayly, Jason Coleman and Jamie McArdle and sophomore Darko Sedlar all returned. Junior Al Drechsler sat out the entire 2002–03 season as a medical redshirt. Junior Brian Robertson transferred to Elmira. Sophomore Tom Femminella transferred to Catholic. Sid Pond, a 6'8" power forward, who averaged 15 points and 15 rebounds per game as a senior at Watertown High School, joined the team. Also added were freshmen Nick Dooley, a 6'0" point guard from Troy, and Corey Smith, a 6'5" shooting guard. Senior Anibal Abdella, a 5'8" guard, who had previously served as the team's manager, made the team as a walk-on. Chris Connolly joined the staff as an assistant coach.

The Dolphins opened the season with a 98–86 win over Alderson-Broaddus in the opening game of the Lid-Lifter Classic, hosted by Pitt–Johnstown, on November 22, 2002. Jason Coleman made four three-pointers and notched 20 points to lead Le Moyne, who had five players score in double figures. The following evening, the Dolphins erased a 12-point second-half deficit with a 13–0 run and went on to take the tournament title with a 73–67 victory over host Pitt–Johnstown. Coleman scored 18 points, grabbed five rebounds and dished four assists. Flagan Prince finished with 13 points, 19 rebounds and four blocked shots for Le Moyne.

The Dolphins hosted Assumption, ranked no. 19 in Division II, on December 19. When the Greyhounds last visited Le Moyne in February 2002, Flagan Prince missed a pair of free throws with nine seconds remaining, and the Dolphins fell, 69–67. Prince was seeking redemption, saying, "I personally felt responsible for what happened last year and carried that with me." However, just over five minutes into the game, Assumption had surged to an early 20–2 lead. After getting challenged by head coach Steve Evans, the Dolphins proved up to the task. Their defense and rebounding improved, leading to transition baskets, and Assumption's lead shrunk to 39–35 by intermission. Le Moyne's momentum carried them through the second half, and they led, 74–65, with 4:15 to play. The Greyhounds put together a furious 8–0 run to pull within a point in the closing minute. However, the Dolphins hit 6 of 8 free throws in the final 30 seconds and secured an 82–78 victory. Prince got his redemption, leading Le Moyne with 21 points on 8-for-12 shooting from the floor and 12 rebounds. Rob Thorpe added 19 points and eight assists. Brett Barnard had 13 points and four blocks, and Jamie McArdle chipped in with 12 points and four steals for Le Moyne. The win was the fourth straight for the Dolphins, improving their record to 6–1 overall and 4–1 in NE10 play.

After falling behind Roberts Wesleyan by 14 points late in the first half of their opening-round game in the Le Moyne College Holiday Tournament on December 28, the Dolphins went on a 45–21 extended run over 20 minutes and earned a 77–72 victory. Although the Raiders played in NAIA Division II, there was heightened interest in the game, since they had seven players from Central New York on their roster. Jason Coleman led Le Moyne with 19 points and added six rebounds, three assists and a steal. Flagan Prince had a double-double with 15 points, 13 rebounds, two assists and a block. With Rob Thorpe shelved by an ankle injury, freshman Nick Dooley was pressed into starting point guard duty and responded with eight points, 10 assists, three rebounds, two steals and a block, while committing only two turnovers.

The following day, Brockport's seven-point advantage over the Dolphins vanished early in the second-half, but the Division III power responded with a 10–0 run to reclaim the lead and held off a Le Moyne charge for a 77–72 victory in the tournament final. Jason Coleman led the Dolphins with 19 points and three steals. Flagan Prince added 14 points, eight rebounds and two blocks. Rob Thorpe contributed 12 points, eight assists and two steals off the bench. Coleman and Nick Dooley were named to the all-tournament team. Le Moyne fell to 7–3 on the season.

The Dolphins snapped a four-game losing streak with a 68–60 home win over Stonehill on January 11, 2003. Le Moyne led by 15 points with 5:37 to play, before the Chieftains went on a 10–0 run fueled by a full-court press to cut their deficit to 54–49 three minutes later. The Dolphins put the game away by hitting 12 of their 13 free-throw attempts in the closing minutes. Flagan Prince, 20 points, 10 rebounds and a block, and Jason Coleman, 12 points and 12 rebounds, each had a double-double for Le Moyne. Rob Thorpe added eight points, eight assists, two rebounds and a steal for the Dolphins, who improved to 8–6 overall and 5–5 in NE10 play.

The Dolphins earned their fourth straight victory with an 87–62 home win over Saint Michael's on January 23. After a slow start, Le Moyne's shooting turned hot and was highlighted by Rob Thorpe's shot from behind the backboard as he was falling out of bounds after getting fouled. Thorpe finished with a game-high 22 points and added seven assists, three rebounds and three steals. After the Purple Knights got within 10 points with just over nine minutes to play, the Dolphins pulled away with a 27–12 run to close the game. Former team manager Anibal Abdella finished the scoring with his first basket of the season, a three-pointer. Flagan Prince recorded 14 points, seven rebounds, two assists and a block, and Brett Barnard had 12 points, seven rebounds and three blocks for Le Moyne. Jamie McArdle came off the bench to stuff the stat sheet with 14 points, eight rebounds, two assists, three blocks and three steals. Le Moyne shot 53% from the floor and 46% from beyond the arc, while limiting Saint Michael's to a 34% clip on field-goal attempts. The Dolphins improved to 11–6 overall and 8–5 in NE10 play.

Flagan Prince posted his eighth double-double of the season, leading the Dolphins to a 74–66 home victory over Southern Connecticut State on February 8. It was Le Moyne's fourth straight win and eighth in the previous nine games. Prince finished with 22 points on 8-for-14 shooting from the floor, 13 rebounds, five assists and a block and held Owls star Aaron Davis in check on the defensive end. Jason Coleman provided the outside game for the Dolphins, scoring 19 points on 5-for-8 shooting from three-point range, and added six rebounds and three assists. Le Moyne improved to 15–7 overall and 12–6 in NE10 play.

After allowing a lead to slip away in the final three minutes at Saint Rose on February 11, the Dolphins were upset at home four days later by Saint Anselm, who entered the game just 7–12 in conference play. Le Moyne showed little defensive intensity, surrendering the most points in a game all season in an 88–84 loss. The Hawks opened the second half with a 12–2 run to build a 12-point lead. The Dolphins pulled within two points with 1:10 to play but got no closer. Flagan Prince had a double-double with 22 points, 12 rebounds, two assists and a block. Rob Thorpe added 17 points, five assists, a rebound and a block for Le Moyne, who fell out of position for a first-round bye in the NE10 tournament at 12–8 in league play and 15–9 overall.

The Dolphins ended their regular season with their fourth straight conference loss, 91–75, at Southern Connecticut State, a team that failed to reach the NE10 tournament, on February 25. Flagan Prince scored 34 points and grabbed eight rebounds for Le Moyne. Jason Coleman added 12 points, six rebounds and five assists. Jamie McArdle came off the bench to log eight points, seven rebounds, two assists and four steals in 30 minutes of action. McArdle was pressed into service after Chris Henry suffered a sprained ankle eight minutes into the game. The loss dropped the Dolphins to 12–10 in NE10 play, tied for sixth place with Bentley and Bryant. The Dolphins earned the no. 6 seed in the conference tournament, since they swept all three games against those teams.

Rob Thorpe scored a career-high 31 points, leading the Dolphins to an 85–74 home win over Merrimack in the first round of the NE10 tournament on March 1. It was the first postseason victory for Le Moyne since 1998. Thorpe, who also had six assists, five rebounds and a steal, scored 12 straight points in a decisive four-minute stretch that ended two minutes into the second half, allowing the Dolphins to pull away. Le Moyne's lead swelled to 18 points, and the Warriors never got closer than eight points down the rest of the way. Flagan Prince added 14 points and six rebounds, and Brett Barnard had 12 points, six rebounds, three assists, two blocks and two steals for Le Moyne.

After a first half that featured nine lead changes and six ties in which the Dolphins shot 73% from the floor but trailed, 46–40, at the intermission at Saint Rose on March 3, Le Moyne was unable to maintain their hot shooting and began to fall behind. The Golden Knights solved the Dolphins' zone defense with ball movement. They had 26 assists on 32 made field goals for the game. Saint Rose also had a 33–28 rebouding edge, which included 16 caroms collected from the offensive boards. The Dolphins made a run and were within three points with possession and 10 minutes to play but turned the ball over. After falling behind again by 12 points, Le Moyne got within four with 3:40 to play, but the Golden Knights hit a dagger triple and went on to secure a 94–88 win in the NE10 quarterfinals, their ninth straight victory over the Dolphins, a streak that started in 1991. Flagan Prince scored 26 points to lead Le Moyne and added six rebounds, four assists and a steal in his final collegiate game. Chris Henry had 19 points and four rebounds before fouling out. Rob Thorpe finished with 11 points, six assists, two steals and a block but committed eight turnovers. The Dolphins ended the season 17–12 overall.

Senior Flagan Prince was selected to the 2003 All-Northeast-10 Conference first team, and junior Rob Thorpe made the third team. Prince was also named second team Division II All-Region and honorable mention Division II All-American.

Members of Le Moyne's recruiting class of 2000 who played as freshmen on the NCAA's youngest team during the 2000–01 season became seniors in 2003, and were poised to play key roles on a veteran squad. The Dolphins lost honorable mention All-American Flagan Prince, their leading scorer and rebounder, and walk-on Anibal Abdella to graduation. Returning for the 2003–04 season were redshirt senior Brett Barnard, seniors Rob Thorpe, Jason Coleman, Chris Henry, Brendan Bayly and Jamie McArdle, redshirt junior Al Drechsler, junior Darko Sedlar and sophomores Sid Pond and Corey Smith. Drechsler was a member of the 2000 recruiting class, who had missed the previous season with an injury. Phil Schoff, a 6'6" shooting guard from Fort Plain, New York, who was a third-team Class C All-New York State selection, averaging 23 points and 12 rebounds per game as a senior at Little Falls High School, was new to the team. Matt Cooper represented a significant local recruiting victory for Le Moyne. He was a 6'7" power forward/center, who was sixth-team Class A All-New York State and averaged 24 points, 13 rebounds and four blocks per game at G. Ray Bodley High School. Head coach Steve Evans expected Cooper to have an immediate impact on the team. Anthony Drayton, a 5'10" guard from Boston, who averaged 21 points, seven rebounds and four assists per game as a senior at Avon Old Farms, signed a letter of intent but ended up attending Lesley instead. Junior John Zych and freshman Derrick Hannah made the team as walk-ons. Thorpe was named team captain. Todd Montana, formerly an assistant at Union (NY), was added to the staff as an assistant coach. The Dolphins were picked to finish 10th in the 15-team NE10 in the preseason coaches poll.

After starting the season 0–4, including 0–3 in NE10 play, the Dolphins earned a 61–53 home win over American International on December 3, 2003. After allowing a 12-point second-half lead to flip to a two-point deficit, Le Moyne closed the game on a 19–9 run over the final nine minutes. Jame McArdle scored a team-high 18 points, grabbed six rebounds, had three steals and dished four assists, including a pass to Brendan Bayly for a jump shot that gave the Dolphins the lead for good. Chris Henry added 10 points, six rebounds and three steals, and Rob Thorpe had 12 points, five assists, two rebounds and two steals for Le Moyne. The Yellow Jackets outrebounded the Dolphins, 52–32, but Le Moyne shot 44% from the floor, while holding American International to 33%. The Dolphins forced 19 turnovers and committed only eight.

The Dolphins won their second straight game, a 72–68 upset at Assumption, ranked no. 21 in Division II, on December 6. Rob Thorpe led Le Moyne with 28 points, four assists, two rebounds and three steals. Jamie McArdle had six boards, two steals and an assist for Le Moyne.

The Dolphins played Nebraska Wesleyan in the opener of the South Padre Island Shootout, a four-team showcase event that included Le Moyne and three Division III clubs, in Los Fresnos, Texas on December 28. After falling behind by 14 points at the break, the Prairie Wolves scored the first six points of the second half to cut their deficit to eight points. Le Moyne responded with a 23–9 run and cruised to an 81–65 victory. Rob Thorpe led the Dolphins with 18 points and seven assists. Sid Pond had a double-double for Le Moyne with 11 points and 10 rebounds. Freshman Matt Cooper added 17 points, six rebounds, two assists and a block. The Dolphins shot 58% from the floor, while holding Nebraska Wesleyan to a 37% clip. The game was the first in program history Le Moyne played outside the Eastern Time Zone.

The following evening, Jason Coleman scored 20 points, grabbed two rebounds and had three steals to lead the Dolphins to a 78–67 victory over Sewanee. Le Moyne was the only team in the South Padre Island Shootout to win both games they played. Rob Thorpe finished with seven points, four rebounds, six assists and a steal and was named the event's most valuable player. Brendan Bayly added 10 points, six boards, three blocks and a steal for the Dolphins, who improved to 5–5 on the season.

The Dolphins hosted Massachusetts Lowell, ranked no. 14 in Division II, on January 6, 2004. By halftime, Le Moyne had built a 10-point lead that swelled to 15 points early in the second half. After Corey Smith hit a jump shot with 13:10 to play, the Dolphins had a 13-point lead. From that point, the River Hawks embarked on a 22–9 run, culminating with a buzzer-beating three-pointer by Elad Inbar that tied the score at 55. Le Moyne shot 0 for 13 from the floor during the run. Jamie McArdle's pass found Brendan Bayly, who made a layup and converted a three-point play, breaking a tie with 29.2 seconds left in overtime. The River Hawks missed four three-pointers on their final possession, and the Dolphins held on for a 61–58 victory. Rob Thorpe led the Dolphins with 16 points and five assists and added six rebounds, a block and an assist. Chris Henry scored four points, grabbed nine rebounds and had three steals and a block for Le Moyne, who evened their record at 6–6 overall and 4–4 in NE10 play.

Senior Jason Coleman scored 14 points and became the 31st player in Le Moyne's program history to reach 1,000 career points in the Dolphins' 74–65 home victory over Saint Anselm on January 17. Jamie McArdle had a game-high 20 points and added four rebounds and an assist for Le Moyne. Brendan Bayly was held scoreless but had seven rebounds and a block. Rob Thorpe finished with nine points, six rebounds, eight assists and a steal. The win was the Dolphins' ninth in their last 12 games and improved their record to 9–7 overall and 7–5 in NE10 play.

The Dolphins won their sixth straight game and 13th of their last 16 contests with an 80–59 home victory over Bryant, ranked no. 2 in the Northeast Region poll, on January 31. The game left both teams at 11–5 in NE10 play, tied for first place in the league. Senior Rob Thorpe had a double-double with 17 points, 12 assists, two rebounds and two steals and became the team's second player this season to reach 1,000 career points. Jamie McArdle also had a double-double for Le Moyne with 14 points, 10 rebounds, four assists and two steals.

After a pair of road losses dropped Le Moyne from first place in the NE10 standings, the Dolphins hosted Saint Rose in a battle for fourth place on February 10. A top-four finish in the league meant a first-round bye in the conference tournament. The Golden Knights entered the game with a 10-game winning streak over the Dolphins with Le Moyne's last win coming in November 1991. Two Le Moyne starters, Jamie McArdle with an ankle injury and Matt Cooper with back trouble, sat out the game. The Dolphins jumped out to an early 21–9 lead with junior Darko Sedlar, making his first collegiate start, scoring 10 points during the early burst. Sedlar did not score the rest of the game, but head coach Steve Evans said the energy infused by the popular player carried the team throughout the contest. All five Le Moyne starters scored in double figures, led by Jason Coleman with 19 points. Rob Thorpe had 17 points, eight assists and three steals. Brendan Bayly finished with 13 points, six rebounds and two blocks, and Chris Henry added 17 points and six rebounds. The Dolphins improved to 14–9 overall and 12–7 in NE10 play.

The Dolphins won their regular-season finale, 70–61, at home over Southern Connecticut on February 24. Le Moyne's six seniors, who were part of the NCAA's youngest team as freshmen, were honored in a ceremony prior to the game. The Dolphins had a 51–48 lead and ended the game with a 19–13 run in the closing minutes. Rob Thorpe led the Dolphins with 18 points, nine assists, five rebounds and two steals. With less than seven minutes to play, Jason Coleman and Mike Vukmanovich of Southern Connecticut were battling on the floor for a loose ball, when Vukmanovich punched Coleman. Chris Henry came to the aid of his teammate and punched Vukmanovich. Henry and Vukmanovich were both ejected. Since NCAA rules mandate a minimum one-game suspension for throwing a punch, the Dolphins would have to play their NE10 tournament opener without Henry. Jamie McArdle, Le Moyne's leading rebounder, played six minutes in his return from a four-game absence with an ankle injury. The Dolphins finished the regular season 17–10 overall and 14–8 in NE10 play, tied for fourth place with Bryant. Since Le Moyne and Bryant split their two regular-season games, the Dolphins were awarded the no. 4 seed, because they won their only game against regular-season champion Massachusetts Lowell, who defeated Bryant twice.

The Dolphins hosted Bryant, who had defeated American International in the first round, in an NE10 quarterfinal game on March 1. The Bulldogs employed a diamond-and-one defense that successfully shut down Rob Thorpe and earned a 72–65 victory. Bryant's head coach said the only other time during his 35-year head coaching career he used such a defense was in a high school game to stop Lamar Odom. Thorpe was limited to five points on 1 for 5 shooting from the floor and had three assists and three steals but committed three turnovers. Jason Coleman led the Dolphins with 22 points and added three rebounds, three assists and a steal. Jamie McArdle added 16 points, four rebounds and two assists, and Corey Smith had nine points, five boards, four assists and a block for Le Moyne.

Rob Thorpe was named 2004 first-team All-Northeast-10 Conference. He finished his career as only the fourth player in program history with at least 1,000 points and 500 assists. Thorpe led the NE10 in assists per game with 6.32 in the 2003–04 season. Matt Cooper was named to the 2004 NE10 All-Rookie team.

The Dolphins lost six seniors, including all five starters, to graduation in 2004. Redshirt senior Al Drechsler rejoined the team after sitting out the previous season with an injury. Seniors Darko Sedlar and walk-on John Zych, juniors Sid Pond and Corey Smith and sophomores Matt Cooper and Phil Schoff all returned. New freshmen added to the team included Trent Morgan, a 5'10" point guard, Jason Holmes, a 6'3" point guard, Matt Vassil, a 6'4" guard, and Dan Cromwell, a center who averaged 16.5 points, 13 rebounds and five blocks per game as a senior at Victor High School and was the first 7-footer in program history. Without a returning point guard, Morgan and Holmes were expected to get significant playing time. Pat Campolieta, who played at Colgate from 1998 to 2002, joined the staff as an assistant coach.

For the first time in program history, the Dolphins opened a season with six straight losses. The streak was snapped by Le Moyne's 74–55 road win at Division III Union (NY) on December 18, 2004. The Dolphins broke open a close game in the second half with a 20–8 run. Matt Cooper scored 20 points and grabbed nine rebounds to lead Le Moyne. Freshman Trent Morgan added 10 points and seven assists for the Dolphins.

After starting the season 3–12 overall and 1–9 in NE10 play, the Dolphins earned their fourth straight victory, a 64–54 home triumph over Southern New Hampshire, ranked no. 25 in Division II, on January 25, 2005. Trailing by five points with less than seven minutes to play, Le Moyne took control of the game with a 13–0 run, capped by a Jason Holmes fast-break dunk. Holmes and Trent Morgan each scored 15 points to lead the Dolphins, and Holmes added eight rebounds. Matt Cooper finished with 14 points and four assists for Le Moyne. Four days later, Sid Pond had a double-double with 15 points and 14 rebounds to lead the Dolphins to an 81–71 home win over UMass Lowell. Morgan finished with 21 points, and Holmes had 18 points and six assists for the Dolphins, who improved to 8–12 overall and 6–9 in NE10 play with their fifth straight victory.

Matt Cooper scored 31 points, including a pair of free throws with 2.3 seconds to play to lead the Dolphins to a 93–91 win at Assumption on February 12, snapping Le Moyne's three-game losing streak. Sid Pond added nine points and nine rebounds, and Trent Morgan finished with 16 points and seven assists for the Dolphins.

The Dolphins clinched a berth in the 2005 NE10 tournament with a 78–62 home win over American International on February 16. Jason Holmes scored 21 points to lead Le Moyne. Matt Cooper added 20 points, and he and Sid Pond each grabbed nine rebounds. Trent Morgan finished with 14 points and five assists for the Dolphins, who improved to 10–15 overall and 8–12 in NE10 play.

The Dolphins won their February 21 regular-season finale on senior night to earn the no. 9 seed in the NE10 tournament. Le Moyne's three seniors, Al Drechsler, Darko Sedlar and John Zych, who were primarily role players on the team, started and played the first seven minutes against Southern Connecticut. Sid Pond had a double-double with 19 points and 11 rebounds. Matt Cooper led the Dolphins with 20 points, and Jason Holmes finished with four points and six assists.

Le Moyne's season ended with a 76–73 loss at no. 8 seed Pace in the first round of the NE10 tournament on February 26. The Dolphins took a one-point lead on a pair of free throws by Jason Holmes with 1:38 to play. The Setters missed two layups on their next possession but got both offensive rebounds and drained two free throws to reclaim the lead. After two Le Moyne turnovers and Pace missing the front end of a one-and-one, Trent Morgan missed a three-pointer, and Matt Cooper grabbed the rebound but could not finish the layup with 10 seconds left. The Setters hit two more free throws, and Le Moyne was unable to get a shot off before the buzzer. Corey Smith led the Dolphins with 17 points and nine rebounds. Cooper also had nine rebounds and added seven points and three blocks. Morgan finished with 16 points and eight assists for Le Moyne, who finished the season 11–17.

Trent Morgan was named 2005 NE10 co-rookie of the year. Sid Pond was named to the NE10 all-academic team.

The Dolphins lost three seniors to graduation in 2005. Seniors Sid Pond and Corey Smith, juniors Matt Cooper and Phil Schoff and sophomores Jason Holmes, Dan Cromwell and Matt Vassil returned. Sophomore Trent Morgan transferred to Kent State. Damani Corbin, a 6'1" freshman point guard from Brooklyn who played at Frederick Douglass Academy was new to the team. Senior Dan Wright, a 5'11" guard who played at Bishop Ludden High School in Syracuse, made the team as a walk-on. Also new to the team were freshmen Stefan Horbanczuk, a 6'3" guard from Vestal High School, Matt Lostumbo, a 5'10" guard from Fairport High School and Luke Postorino, a 5'10" guard from Bridgton Academy. Assistant coach Todd Montana left the staff to become the head coach at Green Mountain. Gallagher Driscoll, who had been an assistant on Le Moyne's 1996 and 1997 NCAA tournament teams, returned to the sidelines as an assistant coach. Pond was named team captain.

Le Moyne athletics launched its new website, www.lemoynedolphins.com, in fall 2005. The site was built on a platform that allows faster and more efficient updating than had been possible in the past. Le Moyne sports information director Mike Donlin said that, when games end, scores would be posted to the website immediately, and, since it is linked to other schools, the data would appear on their websites as well. The website eliminated the need for visiting teams to wait for a fax with game statistics.

The Dolphins broke their program record for biggest margin of victory with a 107–37 home win over Todd Montana's Green Mountain Eagles in the semifinals of the Le Moyne College Holiday Tournament on December 29, 2005. Dan Cromwell led the Dolphins with 18 points and 14 rebounds. Matt Cooper also had a double-double with 16 points and 11 rebounds. Luke Postorino recorded seven points, 12 assists, six rebounds and a steal for Le Moyne. Three other Dolphins scored in double figures, including Sid Pond who had 11 points in only eight minutes. This was Le Moyne's second straight game with over 100 points scored, the first time the team had done that since February 1993. Le Moyne's record for biggest margin of victory had stood since their 86–20 win at Geneseo State on February 11, 1949.

The following evening, Jason Holmes found tournament most valuable player Corey Smith with a pass for a corner three that sealed the Dolphins' 72–65 win over Baruch in the final. Smith finished with 14 points on 4-for-8 shooting from three-point range, six rebounds, four assists and a steal. Sid Pond and Jason Holmes were also named to the all-tournament team. Pond had 16 points, seven rebounds, two assists, two steals and a block. Holmes added 15 points and four assists. The win was the third straight for the Dolphins, evening their record at 5–5.

The Dolphins snapped a five-game losing streak with a 70–63 win at Merrimack on January 16, 2006. Matt Cooper scored 19 points to lead Le Moyne and added five rebounds. Sid Pond finished with six points and 12 rebounds. Luke Postorino had 10 points and dished four assists. The Dolphins improved to 6–10 overall and 2–10 in NE10 play.

The Dolphins earned their second straight victory, a 66–42 home triumph over Stonehill, ranked no. 10 in Division II, on January 19, snapping the Skyhawks' 12-game winning streak. After Stonehill scored the game's first basket, Le Moyne responded with a 9–0 run and led the rest of the way, building a 15-point lead by halftime. The Dolphins shot 56% from the floor and held Stonehill to a 31% clip. Matt Cooper led Le Moyne with 16 points and nine rebounds. Freshman Damani Corbin scored eight points, dished six assists and snatched six rebounds. Without a double-digit rebounder, the Dolphins held a 40–16 edge over the Skyhawks on the boards.

After starting the season 1–10 in league play, the Dolphins earned a key victory in their pursuit of a berth in the 2006 NE10 tournament, defeating Saint Michael's at home, 68–55, on February 4. The win moved the Dolphins into a tie for 12th place in the conference with Saint Michael's and gave them a split in the season series. Matt Cooper led Le Moyne with 18 points, 13 rebounds and four assists. Le Moyne improved to 9–13 overall and 4–13 in NE10 play.

Le Moyne and Assumption entered their February 11 game on Ted Grant Court in a three-way tie with Saint Michael's for the 12th and final NE10 tournament berth. The Greyhounds closed the first half on an 11–4 run over the final six minutes to claim a six-point halftime lead, which they extended to nine points on their first second-half possession. The Dolphins responded with a 9–0 run that knotted the score with 15:41 to play, and neither team led by more than three points the rest of the way. With the game tied at 66, Corey Smith found Sid Pond in the paint for a layup with 1.4 second left, and Pond converted a three-point play to give Le Moyne a 69–66 victory. Matt Cooper scored 15 points to lead Le Moyne. Pond finished with nine points and seven rebounds, and Smith had 10 points and three assists. The Dolphins claimed sole possession of 12th place with Saint Michael's losing to American International and improved to 10–14 overall and 5–14 in NE10 play.

The Dolphins clinched a berth in the 2006 NE10 tournament with a wire-to-wire 75–46 win at Southern Connecticut in their regular-season finale on February 20. Corey Smith scored 24 points to lead Le Moyne. Sid Pond and Matt Cooper each had a team-high seven rebounds, and Pond added 14 points. Damani Corbin finished with two points and six assists. The Dolphins shot 58% from the floor and 64% from three-point range while holding the Owls to 29% shooting. Le Moyne's seventh win in 12 games improved their record to 12–15 overall and 7–15 in NE10 play.

The no. 12 seed Dolphins traveled to no. 5 seed Saint Rose for their NE10 first-round game on February 25. After trailing by two points at halftime, Le Moyne surged to an eight-point lead midway through the second half. The Golden Knights used a 9–0 run to reclaim the lead. Sid Pond's layup put the Dolphins back in front, but Saint Rose scored the next seven points to take the lead for good on their way to a 64–57 victory, ending Le Moyne's season. Corey Smith scored 15 points to lead Le Moyne. Sid Pond had a double-double with 10 points and 16 rebounds. Jason Holmes finished with 11 points, five assists and seven steals.

Damani Corbin was named to the 2006 NE10 all-rookie team. Matt Cooper led the NE10 in field-goal shooting percentage at 61.0%. Le Moyne was the conference's best field-goal shooting team at 48.7%.

The Dolphins lost Sid Pond, Corey Smith and Dan Wright to graduation in 2006. Seniors Matt Cooper and Phil Schoff and juniors Jason Holmes, Dan Cromwell and Matt Vassil all returned. Sophomore Damani Corbin redshirted. Sophomore Luke Postorino transferred to Lynn. Two junior college players transferred to Le Moyne. Mark Covin, a 6'1" point guard, was 2005–06 Central Valley Conference defensive player of the year as a sophomore at Sequoias. Jonathan Joshua, a 6'4" shooting guard, was first-team all-Central Valley Conference as a sophomore at Porterville. After redshirting the previous season, Mike McDonough, a 6'8" center from Ogdensburg Free Academy joined the team for his freshman campaign. Future Le Moyne Athletic Hall of Famer Laurence Ekperigin arrived at Le Moyne in 2006. Ekperigin was a 6'7" power forward, who averaged 23 points per game as a senior at Walter Panas High School. Freshman Durett Miles, a 6'0" point guard, who averaged seven assists per game as a senior at Schenectady joined the team. Senior Adam Zaremba, a 6'2" forward from Union-Endicott, and freshman Brandon Mauer, a 6'1" shooting guard from St. Joseph Central in Massachusetts, made the team as walk-ons. Schoff was named team captain. Clive Bentick, a former assistant at Canisius, joined the staff as an assistant coach.

Matt Cooper became the 33rd player in program history to surpass 1,000 career points in the Dolphins' 88–74 home loss to Saint Rose on November 21, 2006. Cooper scored 13 points in the game. Jonathan Joshua led Le Moyne with 29 points and five rebounds. Nark Covin finished with two points, eight assists and two steals. The loss dropped the Dolphins to 1–2 on the season and 0–1 in NE10 play.

In the Dolphins' next game on November 26, Matt Cooper became the 12th Le Moyne player with 1,000 points and 500 rebounds in his career in an 84–69 home win over Southern New Hampshire. Cooper led the Dolphins with 21 points and seven rebounds. Jason Holmes matched Cooper's points and added six rebounds and four assists. Mike McDonough was Cooper's equal on the boards and contributed seven points. Mark Covin finished with two points, nine assists and a steal.

On December 2, 2006, Le Moyne announced that Matt Bassett would become the school's third athletic director on July 1, 2007, following the retirement of Dick Rockwell. Bassett had most recently been senior associate director of athletics at Binghamton. Bassett was 47 years old at the time of his hiring.

The Dolphins' February 10, 2007 home game against Massachusetts Lowell was broadcast in Central New York on Time Warner Sports channel 26. Le Moyne won the game, 65–59. Jonathan Joshua and Phil Schoff each scored 14 points to lead the Dolphins as Le Moyne celebrated Senior Day. Mark Covin had 11 points, six assists and four steals. Matt Cooper and Laurence Ekperigin each grabbed seven rebounds. The win was Le Moyne's fourth in five games and improved their record to 12–12 overall and 9–10 in NE10 play.

The Dolphins finished the regular season 13–14 overall and 10–12 in NE10 play, tied for ninth place in the conference with Saint Anselm. Le Moyne lost both games against the Hawks and was the no. 10 seed in the conference tournament. Laurence Ekperigin scored 17 points to lead the Dolphins to a 61–54 win at no. 7 seed Stonehill in a first-round game on February 24, 2007. Matt Cooper added 15 points and eight rebounds, and Mark Covin finished with eight points and seven assists.

The Dolphins fell behind, 23–9, early in their NE10 quarterfinal game at no. 2 seed Pace on February 26. Le Moyne battled back and claimed a 42–40 halftime lead. The Setters used a 26–9 second-half run to regain control of the game and held on for a 79–70 victory. Laurence Ekperigin had a double-double with 11 points and 17 rebounds. Senior captain Phil Schoff came off the bench to lead Le Moyne with 17 points. Mark Covin finished with four points, six assists and four steals.

Senior Matt Cooper was named 2007 third-team all-NE10, and Laurence Ekperigin was named to the NE10 all-rookie team. It was the fourth straight season Le Moyne had a player named to the conference's all-rookie team. Cooper was also named to the 11-man roster of the East squad for the Division II All-Star-Game by the NABC.

Practices for the 2007–08 season commenced on October 15, 2007. The Dolphins lost Matt Cooper, Phil Schoff and Adam Zaremba to graduation in 2007. Seniors Jason Holmes, Dan Cromwell, Matt Vassil, Mark Covin and Jonathan Joshua, redshirt sophomores Damani Corbin and Mike McDonough and sophomores Laurence Ekperigin and Durett Miles all returned. Phil Barnes, a 6'2" forward from the Cayman Islands, transferred to Le Moyne after two years at Clinton Community College. Freshmen Kevin Roth, a 6'6" forward from Saint Francis High School in Athol Springs, New York, and Matt Stote, a 6'2" guard from Kingston High School, were new to the team. Sophomore Daniel Jason, a 6'1" guard from Germantown High School in Germantown, New York, who was the team's former manager, made the roster as a walk-on. Stan "Buddy" Evans, father of head coach Steve Evans, replaced Clive Bentick as an assistant coach.

Radio broadcasts of Dolphins games moved to WNSS 1260 AM, an ESPN Radio affiliate, in 2007. Chris Granozio and Don Familo entered their 16th season calling games.

Senior Jason Holmes became the 34th player in program history to score 1,000 career points in the Dolphins' 86–73 victory at Saint Anselm on December 1, 2007. Le Moyne's 8–0 run early in the second half proved decisive, and they led by no less than five points the rest of the way. Holmes finished with 22 points, six rebounds and six assists. Laurence Ekperigin led the Dolphins with 28 points and 17 rebounds. Mark Covin finished with five points, five boards and five helpers. Le Moyne improved to 3–3 overall and 2–2 in NE10 play.

The Dolphins had a three-point lead at Bentley, ranked no. 2 in Division II, on January 12, 2008, with under a minute to play. Jason Westrol picked off a Le Moyne pass and drove to the basket, ultimately converting a three-point play with 38.7 seconds remaining, sending the game to overtime. The Falcons took the lead for good with 1:24 to play in the extra session and went on to a 78–74 victory. Laurence Ekperigin had a double-double to lead the Dolphins with 29 points and 10 rebounds. Mark Covin finished with two points, six boards and six assists. Le Moyne fell to 8–8 overall and 6–5 in NE10 play. Two days later, Ekperigin was named NE10 co-player of the week.

The Dolphins' January 22 home game against Saint Rose was broadcast in Central New York on Time Warner Sports channel 26. Mark Larson was on the call for the play by play, and Danny Liedka handled the color commentary. Le Moyne lost the game, 76–72, and fell to 9–10 overall and 7–7 in NE10 play. Laurence Ekperigin had a double-double with 22 points and 10 rebounds. Jason Holmes had a game-high 23 points and added six boards, five assists and three steals. Damani Corbin finished with four points and six assists.

Senior Jason Holmes became the program's all-time career steals leader with 185 in the Dolphins 89–81 loss at Merrimack on January 26. Holmes finished with 16 points and three steals. Laurence Ekperigin had a double-double with 22 points and 13 rebounds. Damani Corbin scored a game-high 23 points and had four steals to lead Le Moyne. Mark Covin finished with two points and six assists.

In another televised home game, Jason Holmes drove the lane and hit a running layup at the buzzer to give the Dolphins a 73–72 win over Pace. Holmes led the Dolphins with 25 points and five assists. Laurence Ekperigin finished with 12 points and six rebounds for Le Moyne, who improved to 12–11 overall and 10–8 in NE10 play with their third straight victory. Danny Liedka returned for the color, and Steve Infanti handled the play by play on the television broadcast.

Jason Holmes scored a career-high 33 points on Le Moyne's Senior Day, leading the Dolphins to an 86–84 overtime victory over Saint Anselm on February 16. After falling behind by seven points at the break, the Dolphins came back in the second half on the strength of 62% shooting from the floor and the solid interior defensive play of Dan Cromwell. Each team scored two baskets in the first two minutes of overtime, but neither team had a field goal in the final three minutes; Le Moyne held the Hawks scoreless while hitting 2 of 4 from the free-throw line to secure the win. Laurence Ekperigin had a double-double with 25 points and 10 rebounds. Cromwell finished with 10 rebounds, four blocks and two steals, and Damani Corbin had nine assists for the Dolphins, who improved to 13–12 overall and 11–9 in NE10 play.

The Dolphins finished the regular-season 12–10 in conference play in a four-way tie with Stonehill, Merrimack and Bryant for fifth place. Le Moyne had the worst head-to-head record in games played among the teams at 1–2 and were the no. 8 seed in the 2008 NE10 tournament. The Dolphins hosted no. 9 seed Saint Anselm in a first-round game on March 1. Dan Cromwell had 21 points, 10 rebounds and four blocks to lead Le Moyne past the Hawks, 75–70. Trailing by two points midway through the second half, the Dolphins went on a 15–4 run over 8:23 to build a nine-point lead in the final minute. Jason Holmes finished with 14 points and eight assists for Le Moyne.

No. 1 seed Bentley, ranked no. 1 in Division II and riding a 54-game winning streak, hosted the Dolphins in the NE10 quarterfinals on March 3. Le Moyne trailed by eight points with 14:30 to play and went on a 20–7 run to take a five-point lead with 3:39 to play. A 10–0 Falcons run over the next 3:19 gave Bentley a five-point lead with 20 seconds to play. After a Damani Corbin layup, the Falcons missed the front end of a one-and-one. Corbin found Jason Holmes, who drained a triple at the buzzer to send the game to overtime tied at 59. Dan Cromwell's layup gave the Dolphins a 64–63 lead with 1:06 on the clock. The Falcons converted a three-point play with 30 seconds remaining to claim a 66–64 lead. After Holmes missed a jump shot, Bentley added a free throw to extend their lead to three points with 11 seconds left. Kevin Roth missed a three-pointer in the closing seconds, and Bentley secured the rebound for a 67–64 victory. Cromwell finished with 15 points, 12 rebounds, 2 assists, 4 blocks and 2 steals. Holmes added a team-high 18 points, five assists and two steals. The Dolphins finished their season 15–14, snapping their streak of three straight losing campaigns.

Jason Holmes was named the 2008 NE10 defensive player of the year. Laurence Ekperigin, who had 11 double-doubles during the season, was named first-team All-NE10. Ekperigin was also selected second-team Division II All-Northeast Region.

The Dolphins lost Jason Holmes, Dan Cromwell, Mark Covin, Jonathan Joshua and Matt Vassil to graduation in 2008. Senior Phil Barnes, redhsirt juniors Damani Corbin and Mike McDonough, juniors Laurence Ekperigin, Durrett Miles and Daniel Jason and sophomore Kevin Roth all returned. Sophomore Can Ozkaner, a 6'5" guard from Ankara, Türkiye, who played at the Tilton School in New Hampshire, was enrolled at Le Moyne the previous season and listed on the roster but did not play; he made his collegiate debut during the 2008–09 campaign. Ed Archibold Brown, a 6'9" center from Panama City transferred to Le Moyne as a junior from West Georgia. Kevin Hassett, a 6'7" power forward from Phoenix, transferred to Le Moyne as a junior from Iona. Three freshman guards were new to the team: James Cormier, a 5'10" point guard from Trumbull High School, Chris Johnson, 6'0" from Lindenhurst High School, and Menelek Lidonde, 6'1" from Worcester Academy. Ekpergin was named an honorable mention preseason Division II All-American by Sporting News. In a preseason poll of the league's coaches, Le Moyne was picked to finish seventh in the NE10.

The Dolphins opened their season at Syracuse in the College Basketball Experience Classic on November 16, 2008, in a game nationally televised by ESPNU. The Orange's stifling defense led by point guard Jonny Flynn, who also had a game-high 17 points, caused 26 Le Moyne turnovers, powering Syracuse to an 85–51 victory. Freshman Chris Johnson came off the bench and scored 16 points to lead the Dolphins. Laurence Ekperigin added 14 points, seven rebounds, two blocks and three steals. Freshman James Cormier finished with six assists and two steals for Le Moyne.

The Dolphins' November 19 home opener against NE10 rival Saint Rose was televised on Time Warner Cable Sports. Le Moyne had lost seven straight and 17 of their previous 18 games versus the Golden Knights since December 1991. Kevin Roth and Laurence Ekperigin each had a double-double, James Cormier added 15 points and four steals, and Damani Corbin contributed 12 points, seven assists and three steals, leading the Dolphins to a 67–57 victory. Roth finished with 14 points and 13 rebounds, and Ekperigin came off the bench to record 13 points, 11 boards and three blocks.

Laurence Ekperigin scored 40 points on 15-for-17 shooting from the floor, grabbed 15 rebounds, blocked three shots and dished two assists to lead the Dolphins to an 82–61 home win over Saint Michael's on December 13, breaking Le Moyne's four-game losing streak. This was the fourth 40-point game by a Dolphin in program history. Kevin Roth had a double-double with 12 points and 11 rebounds, and Damani Corbin finished with six assists and two steals as Le Moyne improved to 3–5 overall and 3–4 in NE10 play.

On December 22, Laurence Ekperigin was named NE10 player of the week for the third time in four weeks, and Chris Johnson was honored as the conference's freshman of the week. Ekperigin repeated as NE10 player of the week, sharing the honor with Darren Duncan of Merrimack, on January 5, 2009.

Laurence Ekperigin registered his sixth straight double-double and fifth consecutive 20-point, 10-rebound game, leading the Dolphins to a 70–53 home victory over Southern New Hampshire on January 3, 2009, the team's fifth straight win. Early in the game, Ekperigin hit a pair of free throws to become the 35th player in program history to score 1,000 career points and the 13th to score 1,000 points and collect 600 rebounds. Ekperigin finished with 20 points, 12 boards, three blocks and a steal. James Cormier had six asssts and four steals for Le Moyne, who improved to 7–5 overall and 4–4 in NE10 play.

Laurence Ekperigin posted his 17th double-double of the season with 30 points on 10-for-13 shooting from the floor, 20 rebounds and seven blocks, leading the Dolphins to a 77–68 win at Saint Rose on February 10, in a game televised in the Capital District on TW3 and in Central New York on Time Warner Cable Sports. The win was the fifth straight for Le Moyne and their first road triumph over the Golden Knights since November 1991, snapping a streak of nine consecutive losses. With the score tied and 15 minutes to play, Ekperigin scored baskets in the paint on two straight possessions that sandwiched a Saint Rose turnover, and the Dolphins led the rest of the way. Damani Corbin finished with 11 points and five assists for Le Moyne, who improved to 14–10 overall and 10–9 in NE10 play.

On February 16, Laurence Ekperigin was honored as the NE10 player of the week for second straight week and the seventh time this season. Chris Johnson was named freshman of the week for the second time.

The Dolphins clinched home-court advantage for the first round of the 2009 NE10 tournament with an 86–65 win at Saint Micahel's on February 18. Chris Johnson scored 25 points on 10-for-14 shooting from the floor in 29 minutes off the bench to lead Le Moyne. Laurence Ekperigin registered his 19th double-double of the season with 13 points, 10 rebounds and two blocks. James Cormier dished six assists, and Damani Corbin finished with five assists and no turnovers for the Dolphins, who improved to 16–10 overall and 12–9 in NE10 play with their seventh straight win.

On the strength of 23 points, 10 rebounds and five assists by Phil Barnes, the Dolphins won, 75–71, at Southern Connecticut on February 24, and finished 13–9 in league play, sixth in the NE10.

The Dolphins held no. 11 seed Franklin Pierce to 31% shooting from the field, while hitting their own shots at a 49% clip, and topped the Ravens, 73–53, in the first round of the NE10 tournament on February 28. Kevin Roth scored 14 points and snatched seven rebounds to lead Le Moyne. Phil Barnes also had seven boards and added nine points. Damani Corbin contributed 10 points, five assists and four steals. Laurence Eskperigin scored 12 points and blocked four shots.

After inclement weather in New England postponed all four NE10 quarterfinal games by a day, Laurence Ekperigin registered his 20th double-double of the season with 19 points on 7-for-9 shooting from the floor and 17 rebounds to lead the Dolphins to an 80–66 win at Stonehill in their NE10 quarterfinal game on March 3. Damani Corbin finished with 16 points and 10 assists, completing the second double-double of his career.

All four road teams upset the top four seeds in the NE10 quarterfinals, giving the Dolphins a home game in the semifinals against no. 7 seed Southern New Hampshire on March 5. Le Moyne broke open a close game with a 20–11 run in the middle of the second half and held off a late charge by the Penmen to secure a 61–55 victory, their 11th straight win. The winning streak was Le Moyne's longest, since they had 13 consecutive triumphs between February and December 1992, and the longest within a single season since their program-record run of 15 straight wins during the 1964–65 campaign. Laurence Ekperigin recorded his 21st double-double of the season with 17 points, 12 rebounds and five blocks. Phil Barnes also had 12 rebounds and added four blocks. Damani Corbin finished with 10 points, seven assists and three steals for Le Moyne. The Dolphins improved to 20–10 overall, securing the sixth 20-win season in program history and the first since 1997–98.

The Dolphins' season ended with a 77–63 loss at no. 5 seed Assumption in the NE10 tournament final on March 7. Leading by two points with less than 13 minutes to play, the Greyhounds went on an 8–0 run and held the lead the rest of the way. Phil Barnes scored 16 points to lead the Dolphins. Laurence Ekperigin finished with 12 points, eight rebounds and four blocks. Ekperigin finished the season with 354 rebounds and 81 blocks, both new program records, passing Jene Grey's 351 boards in 1977–78, and John Tomsich's 78 blocks in 1995–96. Damani Corbin contributed 14 points and three assists. Ekperigin and Corbin were named to the all-tournament team. Miles Durrett had eight points and four assists for Le Moyne, and James Cormier added four steals. Cormier was named NE10 freshman of the week on March 9.

Laurence Ekperigin was named 2009 NE10 player of the year and first-team all-conference. Chris Johnson was named to the NE10 all-freshman team, the fifth time in six seasons a Le Moyne player was selected. Ekperigin led the NE10 in rebounding with 11.4 per game and field-goal percentage at 68.4%. Le Moyne was the NE10's best shooting team at 48.2%. Ekperigin was also named ECAC Division II player of the year, East Region Division II player of the year, first-team NABC East Region all-district, first-team Division II All-America selected by sports information directors and Basketball Times second-team Division II All-America. Ekperigin was third in scoring in the NE10 and second in rebounding in Division II. He ranked seventh in Division II in blocked shots and was the national leader in double-doubles with 21.

The Dolphins lost Phil Barnes and Mike McDonough, who played the previous season as a redshirt junior, to graduation in 2009. Graduate student Damani Corbin, seniors Laurence Ekperigin, Kevin Hassett, Durrett Miles, Daniel Jason and Ed Archibold Brown, juniors Kevin Roth and Can Ozkaner and sophomores Chris Johnson, James Cormier and Menelek Lidonde all returned. Junior Matt Stote rejoined the team after sitting out his sophomore season. Michael Goodman, a 6'6" forward from Christian Brothers Academy, and Jim Janson, a 6'11" center from Scotia-Glenville, signed letters of intent in April 2009. Goodman was the first player in his high school's program history to score 1,000 points and collect 1,000 rebounds in his career. He averaged 14.3 points and 13.2 rebounds per game as a high school senior and was named first-team All-Central New York by The Post-Standard and fourth-team all-state Class AA by the New York State Sportswriters Association (NYSSWA). Janson averaged 17.2 points, 14.2 rebounds and 5.6 blocked shots per game as a senior and was named first-team all-area by The Daily Gazette in Schenectady and ninth-team all-state Class A by the NYSSWA. Janson was the Section II Class A tournament most valuable player, leading Scotia-Glenville to the title. Janson injured his ankle in his first practice with the Dolphins and redshirted for the 2009–10 season. Gamal Mohamed, a 6'2" guard from Immaculata in Somerville, New Jersey, signed with Le Moyne in May 2009. Mohamed averaged 19 points, six rebounds and five assists per game as a senior and was named Somerset County player of the year by local news media and second-team all-state. Mohamed was the most valuable player of the state non-public Class A tournament twice.

Over the summer, Le Moyne senior Ed Archibold Brown played for Panama in the 2009 FIBA Americas Championship tournament. Archibold Brown came off the bench and averaged 1.0 points, 1.9 rebounds and eight minutes per game.

Laurence Ekperigin was named a second-team preseason Division II All-American by Sporting News.

Although it was an exhibition game, the Dolphins nevertheless attracted national attention when they defeated Syracuse at the Carrier Dome on November 3, 2009. Syracuse was ranked no. 25 in the preseason ESPN/USA Today Coaches Poll at the time. However, Chris Johnson's three-pointer with 8.3 seconds remaining gave Division II Le Moyne an 81–79 lead. After Wesley Johnson missed a three-pointer for the Orange, Can Ozkaner hit a free throw with 1.3 seconds to play, and Le Moyne secured an 82–79 road victory over a Division I national power. The Dolphins trailed by 10 points with 14:21 to play. After chipping the deficit to seven points, the Dolphins went on a 10–0 run to take a 58–55 lead with 8:24 remaining. Kevin Roth's fast-break layup gave Le Moyne a 78–73 lead with 42 seconds left. The Orange scored six points, while Le Moyne committed two fouls and missed a layup, over the next 20 seconds and reclaimed the lead, before Chris Johnson's heroics won the game for the Dolphins. Chris Johnson scored 22 points to lead Le Moyne. Laurence Ekperigin had a double-double with 20 points, 11 rebounds, four blocks, three assists and three steals. Damani Corbin finished with 11 points, five assists and three steals. The Dolphins shot 48% from the floor and held Syracuse to 42%. Le Moyne outscored the Orange in the paint, 42–30. Syracuse had finished the previous season 28–10, ranked no. 13 in Division I, and reached the Sweet 16 of the NCAA tournament. Once the 2009–10 season started, the Orange recovered. They were Big East Conference regular-season champions and reached the Sweet 16 of the 2010 NCAA tournament.

After falling behind by 14 points early in the second half at Queens (NY) on November 21, the Dolphins dominated the final 16 minutes and defeated the Knights, 79–68, in the ECC/Northeast-10 Challenge. Laurence Ekperigin scored 30 points on 11-for-16 shooting, grabbed 14 rebounds and blocked two shots to lead Le Moyne. James Cormier dished five assists, and Kevin Roth scored seven points, snatched 10 boards and blocked three shots for the Dolphins. Le Moyne shot 65% from the floor in the second half, while limiting Queens to 29%. The Dolphins improved to 3–0 on the season. Laurence Ekperigin was named NE10 player of the week on November 23, after averaging 20 points and 12 rebounds over two games.

The Dolphins were ranked no. 20 in the NABC Cogress Division II poll on November 24, but were upset at home that evening by American International, 72–68. It was Le Moyne first appearance in a poll since February 1988. After falling behind, 12–2, in the game's opening minutes, the Dolphins recovered and had a six-point lead with 9:37 on the clock. However, the Yellow Jackets went on a 17–3 run over 5:17 that gave them a nine-point lead with 3:17 to play. American International was 5-for-5 from three-point range during the spurt. Le Moyne cut their deficit to three points with 15 seconds remaining but could get no closer. Kevin Roth and Laurence Ekperigin each had a double-double for the Dolphins. Roth scored 14 points and grabbed 11 rebounds. Ekperigin registered 10 points, 14 boards and three blocks. Chris Johnson scored 15 points to lead Le Moyne, and Durrett Miles dished six assists in 15 minutes off the bench.

Laurence Ekperigin scored 30 points on 12-for-16 shooting from the floor, snatched 12 rebounds and added two blocks and two steals to lead the no. 20 Dolphins to an 80–79 victory at New Haven on November 29. Le Moyne had a 12-point lead with under 12 minutes to play, but the Chargers capped a 26–14 extended run, when Kelvin Jackson converted a three-point play following a dunk, tying the score at 72 with 2:52 left. After New Haven took a one-point lead with 16.7 seconds on the clock, Kevin Roth hit a pair of free throws with 7.9 seconds remaining. The Chargers missed a three-pointer in the closing seconds and collected the offensive rebound but could not get another shot off before the buzzer. Roth finished with eight points, four rebounds and an assist. Damani Corbin had 19 points, five assists and five steals for Le Moyne. James Cormier also dished five assists, as the Dolphins improved to 4–1 overall and 2–1 in NE10 play.

Laurence Ekperigin was named NE10 co-player of the week on December 7, after averaging 18.5 points, 14 rebounds and 3.5 blocks in two games.

Despite an exit from the 2014 NE10 tournament in the semifinals, Le Moyne received an at-large NCAA tournament bid. As the no. 6 seed in the East Region, the Dolphins were defeated by Saint Anselm. Le Moyne finished the 2013–14 season 17–12.

=== Coach Patrick Beilein and three straight NCAA tournaments ===
Patrick Beilein, son of John Beilein, who coached the Dolphins from 1983 to 1992, took the head coaching reins in 2015. After a losing record in his first season, Beilein produced an era of success for Le Moyne basketball with three straight NCAA tournament appearances. Beilein made his debut as the Dolphins' head coach in an exhibition game against Michigan, coached by his father, at the Crisler Center. More than 70 members of the Beilein clan traveled from around the country to attend the game, which Michigan won, 74–52.

In 2016–17, the Dolphins won the NE10 Southwest Division title and had the best regular-season record in the entire conference. Despite being upset in the NE10 tournament semifinals, Le Moyne's 22–6 record was good enough to secure an at-large berth as the no. 1 seed in the East Region of the NCAA tournament, hosting the first three rounds. However, the Dolphins suffered a first-round loss to Merrimack, 72–68, in overtime in front of the home crowd. For his efforts, Beilein was named 2017 NE10 coach of the year.

Le Moyne's 2017–18 season was perhaps the best in program history by all measures. They achieved a new high in wins with 27, won the NE10 Southwest Division title, had the best conference record of any NE10 team, won the conference tournament and secured a no. 1 seed and hosting rights at the NCAA tournament and advanced to the Elite Eight. The Dolphins were an astounding 18–2 in conference play and entered the NE10 tournament with a 21–6 record and blitzed their way to the title. They defeated Stonehill by 39 points in the quarterfinals and topped Merrimack, 83–55, in the semifinals. The title game was a 69–63 victory over Northeast Division champion Saint Anselm. Le Moyne's Isaiah Eisendorf was named tournament MVP. Coach Beilein collected his second straight NE10 coach of the year award.

Playing at home in the NCAA tournament, Le Moyne scored victories over Jefferson, Saint Rose and Bloomfield. The Elite Eight was held in Sioux Falls, South Dakota, where the Dolphins fell to West Texas A&M, 87–73. Entering the NCAA tournament, Le Moyne was ranked no. 24 nationally in the season's final Division II coaches poll.

Le Moyne won another NE10 Southwest Division title in 2018–19. The Dolphins were upset at home in the conference tournament semifinals by Merrimack, 84–77, in overtime. Nevertheless, Le Moyne's 18–10 record earned them the no. 3 seed in the East Region at the NCAA tournament. The Dolphins were matched up in the first round with St. Thomas Aquinas, coached by former Le Moyne assistant coach, Tobin Anderson. After the Dolphins built a 19-point lead, the Spartans staged a furious comeback to earn a 61–59 victory and eliminate Le Moyne from the tournament. After the season, Beirlein left Le Moyne to become the head coach at Division I Niagara.

=== Nate Champion era ===
Nate Champion, a Le Moyne alumnus, was hired as the new head coach in 2019. The Dolphins won their fourth straight NE10 Southwest Division title and had the best NE10 regular-season conference record in Champion's first season. Le Moyne bowed out at home in the NE10 tournament quarterfinals to New Haven, 75–73. Champion was named NE10 coach of the year, the third straight season the award had been won by a Le Moyne coach. The 2020 NCAA tournament was cancelled due to the COVID-19 pandemic.

==== Reclassification to Division I ====
In April 2022, Le Moyne College president Linda LeMura revealed that the school had hired a consultant to assess the feasibility of reclassifying to Division I and had begun internal discussions regarding the potential impact. In September 2022, a social media post of a sports journalist indicated that the decision to move to Division I had been made, but no official announcement would come from Le Moyne, until it had officially been invited to join a conference.

Northeast Conference logo in Le Moyne colors

On May 10, 2023, Le Moyne announced that the school would begin a transition to Division I, joining the Northeast Conference (NEC). The Dolphins officially became a Division I program and a member of the NEC on July 1.

As a team transitioning from Division II, Le Moyne initially was ineligible for the NCAA Division I tournament until 2028, since there was a required four-year transition period. However, January 2025 NCAA legislation allows schools transitioning from Division II to Division I to have their four-year transition period reduced to three years, if they meet revised criteria and apply to the NCAA to do so. If this process is completed, Le Moyne would become eligible for the 2027 NCAA Division I tournament.

Effective for the 2023–24 academic year, NEC teams transitioning from Division II became eligible to participate in the NEC tournament during the entirety of their transition periods. Prior to the conference's rule change, NEC teams were eligible for the conference tournament only during their third and fourth transition years. As a result, Le Moyne was eligible for the 2024 NEC tournament.

Darrick Jones Jr. hit a three-pointer from the top of the key early in the Dolphins' season opener at Georgetown for Le Moyne's first points scored as a Division I program on November 7, 2023. Ball State transfer Kaiyem Cleary led the Dolphins with 11 points, all in the second half, and seven rebounds. Georgetown used a 9–2 run to take a 12–5 lead early in the game. The Hoyas extended the lead with an 8–0 run that made the score 20–7. After a brief flurry led by Jones, Trent Mosquera and Mike DePersia got the Dolphins within single digits at 28–19, the Hoyas closed the first half with a 19–4 run that gave them a 47–23 halftime lead on their way to a 94–57 victory. Jones and Luke Sutherland each contributed nine points for Le Moyne in the losing cause.

Le Moyne used first-half runs of 16–2 and 20–2 to build a 47–15 lead and never looked back on their way to a 105–46 victory, their first as a Division I program, over Division III SUNY Canton in their 2023–24 home opener on November 13, 2023. Five Dolphins had double-figure scoring games led by Kaiyem Cleary with 21 points. Cleary shot 8 for 10 from the field, while adding seven rebounds and two steals in just 16 minutes. The Dolphins shot 32 for 37 on two-point field goals for the game, including 15 for 16 in the first half.

Le Moyne recorded its first victory over a Division I opponent as a Division I program, an 80–70 win at Cal State Northridge on November 21, 2023, in their opening game of the Golden State Hoops Jam, a multi-team event sponsored by Pacific. Luke Sutherland led the Dolphins with 24 points and five rebounds. Le Moyne started five graduate students for the first time in the program's history, and they responded by sprinting to an 11–4 lead to start the game. After Le Moyne fell behind, 15–12, Mike DePersia (eight points, nine assists, four rebounds and three steals for the game) sparked a 19–2 run with a pull-up jump shot. The Matadors could not get closer than three points behind the rest of the way. The Dolphins closed out the game with strong free-throw shooting, finishing the game 31 for 34 from the charity stripe.

Kaiyem Cleary scored 43 points on January 27, 2024, to break Le Moyne's single-game individual scoring record, first set on January 7, 1955, and the Dolphins cruised to an 87–74 victory over LIU. Cleary's 43 points were the most scored by a player in regulation and the third most scored by a player in a single game up to that point in the Division I season. Cleary was 14 for 25 from the floor, including 6 for 10 from beyond the arc, and shot 9 for 9 from the free-throw line. He also led Le Moyne in rebounds with seven and had a pair of blocked shots. With Le Moyne trailing, 46–45, early in the second half, Cleary scored 13 points over six and a half minutes to spark a decisive 20–4 run that put the Dolphins ahead, 65–50.

Kaiyem Cleary scored with 45 seconds left in regulation to tie up Le Moyne's home game with Central Connecticut on February 15. After the Blue Devils took a one-point lead in overtime, the Dolphins scored the final six points of the extra session, including a baseline jump shot by Cleary with 1:24 to play that gave Le Moyne the lead for good. Cleary finished with 21 points, 11 rebounds, two assists and two blocked shots. With the win, Le Moyne clinched a berth in the NEC tournament.

Entering the final day of the regular season, Le Moyne had the opportunity to earn the no. 4 seed in the NEC tournament and home-court advantage in the NEC quarterfinals with a win. If the Dolphins were to lose, the no. 4 seed would go to the winner of the regular-season finale between Fairleigh Dickinson and Wagner scheduled for the same day.

Le Moyne claimed the no. 4 seed in the NEC tournament and home-court advantage in the NEC quarterfinals with a 74–58 win at Saint Francis on March 2. Luke Sutherland led the Dolphins with 22 points, shooting 8 for 10 from the field and 3 for 4 from beyond the arc, seven rebounds, a career-high eight assists, two blocked shots and one steal. After the Red Flash took a 3–0 lead, Le Moyne went on a 10–0 run, keyed by five points from Nate McClure, and led the rest of the way.

Kaiyem Cleary was named first-team All-NEC. Luke Sutherland was named to the all-conference second team.

Powered by Luke Sutherland's 22 points, Le Moyne cruised to an 82–61 wire-to-wire victory over Fairleigh Dickinson in the program's Division I postseason debut on March 6. The Dolphins opened the game with three three-pointers to take a 9–0 lead just 1:45 into the contest.

After Le Moyne jumped out to an early 13–4 lead in the NEC semifinals on March 9, Merrimack's defense got the Warriors back into the game, and a 19–3 run in the later part of the first half helped them build a 28–20 lead at intermission. The Dolphins cut the deficit to three with 14:47 to play on a put-back by Kaiyem Cleary. The teams traded three-pointers over the next three minutes, until Samba Diallo's layups on consecutive possessions extended Merrimack's lead to seven points. The Dolphins responded with a 6–2 run to get within three points at 40–37 with 8:14 to play. An 8–2 Warriors run gave them a nine-point lead with 6:45 on the clock, but Le Moyne responded with a pair of three-pointers by Luke Sutherland to pull within three again with 5:42 to play. After each team had two empty possessions over the next two minutes, Bryan Etumnu was fouled on a layup and completed the three-point play, sparking a 9–2 Merrimack run that put the game away. The Warriors' 61–51 victory ended the Dolphins' inaugural Division I season. Sutherland had 23 points and eight rebounds for Le Moyne, and he was named to the NEC All-Tournament Team.

== Season-by-season results ==
In 76 completed seasons through 2024–25, the Dolphins have finished with a winning record 50 times, a losing record 22 times and a .500 record four times.

== Coaches ==
There have been nine head coaches in the history of Le Moyne men's basketball. The program has played 1,949 games across 76 seasons from the program's inaugural 1948–49 campaign through the end of the 2024–25 season.

Tommy Niland had the longest tenure at Le Moyne, coaching for 25 seasons, and is the all-time leader in games coached (534) and wins (324) at the school.

Patrick Beilein has the highest winning percentage among Le Moyne head coaches with a 77–41 (.653) record over four seasons from 2015 to 2019.

The current head coach is Nate Champion, who played for the Dolphins from 2010 to 2014.

== Postseason results ==
=== NCAA Division II ===
During their time in NCAA Division II, the Dolphins were selected to play in the NCAA Division II men's basketball tournament 14 times. They had a combined record of 7–18.

Year	Round	Opponent	Result
1959	Regional Semifinals	Williams	W 72–66
1959	Sweet 16	Saint Michael's	L 70–71
1960	Regional Semifinals	St. Anselm	L 75–108
1960	Regional Third Place	Assumption	L 68–94
1964	Regional Semifinals	Youngstown State	W 64–53
1964	Sweet 16	Akron	L 38–62
1965	Regional Semifinals	Assumption	L 58–76
1965	Regional Third Place	Hartwick	L 68–70
1966	First Round	Philadelphia Textile	L 61–83
1966	Regional Consolation	Potsdam State	W 86–63
1968	First Round	Buffalo State	L 66–83
1968	Regional Consolation	Northeastern	L 54–67
1969	Regional Semifinals	Montclair State	L 75–79
1969	Regional Third Place	Albany State (NY)	L 70–71
1988	Regional Semifinals	California (PA)	L 88–91
1988	Regional Third Place	Kutztown	W 89–81
1996	First Round	Franklin Pierce	L 53–83
1997	First Round	Saint Rose	L 76–92
2014	First Round	Saint Anselm	L 62–73
2017	First Round	Merrimack	L 68–72^{OT}
2018	First Round	Jefferson	W 75–57
2018	Regional Semifinals	Saint Rose	W 67–63
2018	Sweet 16	Bloomfield	W 75–59
2018	Elite Eight	West Texas A&M	L 73–87
2019	First Round	St. Thomas Aquinas	L 59–61

=== National Catholic Invitational Tournament ===
The Dolphins participated in the National Catholic Invitational Tournament twice. They had a combined record of 4–2.

Year	Round	Opponent	Result
1951	First Round	Saint Michael's	W 95–57
1951	Quarterfinals	Siena	W 57–53
1951	Semifinals	St. Francis (NY)	L 66–84
1951	Third Place	Mount St. Mary's	W 63–61
1952	First Round	Providence	W 67–63
1952	Quarterfinals	St. Francis (NY)	L 61–75

=== Utica Optimist Club Invitational Tournament ===
The Dolphins participated in the Utica Optimist Club Invitational Tournament three times. They had a combined record of 6–0, winning the tournament each time they participated.

Year	Round	Opponent	Result
1950	Semifinals	Brockport	W 67–60
1950	Final	Utica	W 59–57
1951	Semifinals	Utica	W 86–69
1951	Final	Hartwick	W 86–65
1952	Semifinals	Utica	W 72–42
1952	Final	Hartwick	W 72–61

=== NCAA tournament seeding history ===
The NCAA began seeding the Division II tournament with the 1988 edition.

Years →	'88	'96	'97	'14	'17	'18	'19	'20
Seeds →	3	5	6	6	1	1	3	5 (Note: No postseason held due to the COVID-19 pandemic)

Note

Between 1958 and 1987, the NCAA chose eight or nine schools as hosts for the College Division/Division II regionals. These teams played their regional semifinal games and (if they won) their regional final (Sweet 16) games at home during years the tournament included 32 teams. In some years, there were 36 teams with seven regions having four teams and one region having eight teams. In eight-team regions, the host school might have played as many as three tournament games at home, if it was designated as being in the section given home-court advantage for the regional final. A host school effectively had the privileges of what would later be identified as a no. 1 seed. However, factors such as availability and quality of facilities, expected fan support and travel arrangements entered into the choice of a host school. By the 1980s, the four teams in each region, including the top seed, each submitted competing bids to the NCAA for the right to host, which meant the fourth-seeded team in the region could be selected to play at home. In addition, teams generally played in regions that reflected the locations of the schools. Therefore, if the two best teams in the College Division or Division II were near each other, it is likely only one of them would be selected to host. Thus, the hosts were not necessarily the top eight teams. Nevertheless, Le Moyne was one of the eight host schools for the 1965 and 1969 NCAA tournaments.

The 1966 NCAA tournament included 36 schools, four more than the previous season. Seven of the eight regions had four teams as had previously been the norm. The Northeast Region had eight teams divided into two sections. Le Moyne was selected to host the four games in Section B of the Northeast Region. However, as of the time Le Moyne was chosen as a host, the Dolphins had not yet been extended a bid to play in the tournament. Le Moyne agreed to host regardless of whether it was participating. The Section A winner had the right to host the regional final, meaning Le Moyne, which ultimately did receive a tournament bid, would have played the regional final on the road had they advanced that far. This effectively treated Le Moyne as the no. 2 seed in the region. However, none of the no. 2 seeds in the other seven regions played at home. Since Le Moyne was placed in an eight-team region, it would have needed to win one more game than all 28 teams in four-team regions to reach the national quarterfinals, which makes the extra game similar to a play-in game such as the First Four in the Division I tournament through 2026.

== Games against higher-division opponents ==
Starting with Le Moyne's inaugural 1948–49 season through the end of the 1955–56 campaign, the final season before the NCAA split into the University Division and the College Division, the Dolphins were classified by the Associated Press (AP) as a small-college (non-major) program. During that time, Le Moyne played 59 games against major programs, as classified by the AP. The results of such games are shown in the table below.

Date	Opponent	Result	Le Moyne record
December 7, 1948	Siena	Loss, 41−39	0−1
January 29, 1949	at Siena	Loss, 53−31	0−2
December 14, 1949	at St. Bonaventure	Loss, 50−48	0−3
December 16, 1949	St. Francis (NY)	Loss, 78−68	0−4
January 13, 1950	St. Bonaventure	Loss, 51−44	0−5
February 18, 1950	John Carroll	Win, 78−67	1−5
November 23, 1950	at Siena	Loss, 70−68^{2OT}	1−6
November 29, 1950	at Niagara	Loss, 86−61	1−7
December 2, 1950	at Seton Hall	Loss, 63−53	1−8
December 5, 1950	at St. Bonaventure	Loss, 56−47	1−9
December 30, 1950	Siena	Win, 53−47	2−9
March 14, 1951	at #18 Siena†	Win, 57−53	3−9
March 16, 1951	St. Francis (NY)‡	Loss, 84−66	3−10
November 22, 1951	at Siena	Loss, 62−41	3−11
December 5, 1951	at Seton Hall	Loss, 55−48	3−12
December 7, 1951	at St. Francis (NY)	Loss, 56−51	3−13
December 15, 1951	at #15 Villanova	Loss, 59−48	3−14
January 18, 1952	#11 Siena	Win, 53−51	4−14
January 28, 1952	Manhattan	Loss, 79−71	4−15
February 1, 1952	Boston College	Loss, 74−58	4−16
February 26, 1952	at Canisius	Loss, 74−58	4−17
March 17, 1952	St. Francis (NY)††	Loss, 75−61	4−18
November 27, 1952	at Siena	Loss, 53−49	4−19
December 13, 1952	at Niagara	Loss, 70−67	4−20
December 19, 1952	John Carroll	Win, 72−65	5−20
December 30, 1952	Loyola of Los Angeles	Win, 79−74	6−20
January 3, 1953	at #2 Seton Hall	Loss, 75−52	6−21
January 10, 1953	St. Francis (NY)	Loss, 67−56	6−22
January 23, 1953	#20 Manhattan	Loss, 63−57	6−23
January 26, 1953	Georgetown	Loss, 89−67	6−24
January 30, 1953	Boston College	Win, 64−59	7−24
February 24, 1953	Siena	Win, 68−65	8−24
February 28, 1953	at Villanova	Loss, 62−57	8−25
December 2, 1953	St. Bonaventure	Loss, 67−57	8−26
December 5, 1953	at Siena	Win, 60−40	9−26
December 12, 1953	at St. Bonaventure	Loss, 58−52	9−27
January 29, 1954	Manhattan	Loss, 67−63	9−28
February 5, 1954	Boston College	Win, 77−63	10−28
February 22, 1954	at Villanova	Loss, 62−48	10−29
March 6, 1954	Siena	Loss, 63−55	10−30
December 7, 1954	at #8 Niagara	Loss, 81−57	10−31
December 11, 1954	#20 Western Kentucky State	Win, 77−75	11−31
January 1, 1955	at Siena	Win, 64−60	12−31
January 7, 1955	Saint Joseph's	Win, 94−83	13−31
January 28, 1955	Manhattan	Loss, 72−65	13−32
January 31, 1955	at St. Bonaventure	Loss, 58−52	13−33
February 4, 1955	Boston College‡‡	Win, 82−73	14−33
February 22, 1955	St. Bonaventure	Loss, 73−69^{OT}	14−34
February 26, 1955	at Villanova	Loss, 73−44	14−35
March 5, 1955	Siena	Win, 78−62	15−35
December 1, 1955	at Siena	Win 78−71	16−35
December 21, 1955	Iona†††	Win, 93−70	17−35
January 4, 1956	at St. Bonaventure	Loss, 80−70	17−36
January 10, 1956	at Niagara	Loss, 81−72	17−37
February 3, 1956	Boston College‡‡‡	Win, 92−76	18−37
February 4, 1956	Manhattan	Loss, 94−72	18−38
February 17, 1956	Iona	Win, 90−82	19−38
February 22, 1956	St. Bonaventure	Loss, 81−61	19−39
March 2, 1956	Siena	Win, 82−59	20−39
Home			13−15
Road			4−22
Neutral			3−2
Ranked opponents • Home • Road			3–4; 2–1; 1–3
(#) Ranking per AP major-program poll † National Catholic Invitational Tournament quarterfinal played on Siena's home court ‡ National Catholic Invitational Tournament semifinal played in Albany, New York †† National Catholic Invitational Tournament quarterfinal played in Troy, New York ‡‡ Game played in Rochester, New York ††† Game played in Quantico, Virginia ‡‡‡ Game played in Auburn, New York

On several occasions, the Dolphins, playing as a College Division or Division II team, recorded victories over University Division or Division I teams. Le Moyne played 58 such games, going 29–29, and won at least one in each of their first 13 seasons as a College Division program, beginning with the NCAA's split into divisions for the 1956–57 season through the end of the 1968–69 season. Details of games played against Division I/University Division opponents are shown in the table below.

Date	Opponent	Result	Le Moyne record
December 1, 1956	at Siena	Win, 74–41	1−0
January 3, 1957	at St. Bonaventure	Loss, 82–62	1−1
January 19, 1957	Siena	Win, 68–59	2−1
February 2, 1957	Manhattan	Loss, 81–71	2−2
February 9, 1957	St. Francis (NY)	Win, 77–71	3−2
February 16, 1957	at Iona	Loss, 76–72	3−3
February 20, 1957	St. Bonaventure	Loss, 69–61	3−4
December 10, 1957	at St. Bonaventure	Loss, 58–46	3−5
December 21, 1957	at Siena	Loss, 78–72	3−6
December 27, 1957	Saint Francis (PA)†	Loss, 70–51	3−7
February 5, 1958	St. Bonaventure	Loss, 65–50	3−8
February 14, 1958	Iona	Win, 64–44	4−8
February 22, 1958	at St. Francis (NY)	Loss, 86–73	4−9
March 1, 1958	Siena	Win, 58–50	5−9
March 5, 1958	at Saint Joseph's	Loss, 69–68	5−10
December 1, 1958	at Villanova	Loss, 83–67	5−11
December 20, 1958	at Siena	Win, 66–65^{OT}	6−11
January 31, 1959	St. Francis (NY)	Win, 74–61	7−11
February 14, 1959	at Iona	Loss, 58–54	7−12
February 28, 1959	Siena	Win, 60–59	8−12
December 7, 1959	at Siena	Win, 60–46	9−12
December 12, 1959	at Niagara	Loss, 62–57	9−13
February 5, 1960	at St. Francis (NY)	Win, 77–66	10−13
February 13, 1960	Iona	Win, 59–44	11−13
February 27, 1960	Siena	Win, 61–48	12−13
December 28, 1960	Iona‡	Win, 90–60	13−13
January 28, 1961	at Iona	Loss, 68–63	13−14
February 23, 1961	at Providence	Loss, 80–50	13−15
January 27, 1962	Iona	Win, 61–58^{OT}	14−15
February 5, 1962	Providence	Loss, 53–46	14−16
February 10, 1962	at St. Francis (NY)	Win, 73–69	15−16
January 20, 1963	at Niagara	Loss, 68–54	15−17
February 2, 1963	St. Francis (NY)	Win, 65–64^{OT}	16−17
February 9, 1963	at Iona	Loss, 57–51	16−18
December 7, 1963	at Niagara	Loss, 66–53	16−19
January 11, 1964	at St. Francis (NY)	Win, 58–54	17−19
February 1, 1964	Iona	Win, 74–56	18−19
January 9, 1965	at Iona	Win, 67–64	19−19
January 27, 1965	Saint Peter's	Win, 75–55	20−19
February 6, 1965	St. Francis (NY)	Win, 53–46	21−19
January 29, 1966	Iona	Win, 83–71	22−19
February 4, 1966	at Saint Peter's	Loss, 92–72	22−20
February 5, 1966	at St. Francis (NY)	Win, 75–71^{OT}	23−20
December 28, 1966	Maine	Win, 85–74	24−20
December 29, 1966	Iona	Loss, 59–45	24−21
January 4, 1967	Saint Peter's	Loss, 87–73	24−22
January 28, 1967	at Iona	Loss, 65–48	24−23
February 11, 1967	St. Francis (NY)	Win, 73–62	25−23
December 7, 1967	Iona	Loss, 58–57	25−24
December 28, 1967	Vermont	Win, 95–72	26−24
December 29, 1967	Bucknell	Win, 78–74^{OT}	27−24
January 5, 1968	at Saint Peter's	Loss, 114–75	27−25
January 6, 1968	at St. Francis (NY)	Loss, 72–64	27−26
January 25, 1968	Boston College	Loss, 90–61	27−27
December 3, 1968	Saint Peter's	Win, 81–80	28−27
December 5, 1968	at Boston College	Loss, 86–66	28−28
January 4, 1969	St. Francis (NY)	Win, 80–75	29−28
January 30, 1969	at Iona	Loss, 68–59	29−29
December 20, 1969	Boston College	Loss, 75–56	29−30
January 2, 1970	at Saint Peter's	Loss, 105–83	29−31
January 3, 1970	at St. Francis (NY)	Loss, 90–69	29−32
February 14, 1970	Iona	Loss, 89–81	29−33
December 5, 1970	St. Francis (NY)	Win, 68–62	30−33
December 16, 1970	at Boston College	Loss, 105–68	30−34
December 30, 1970	Lafayette	Loss, 89–75	30−35
January 30, 1971	at Iona	Loss, 67–65	30−36
February 16, 1971	Saint Peter's	Loss, 85–53	30−37
December 4, 1971	at St. Francis (NY)	Loss, 85–79	30−38
December 18, 1971	Boston College	Loss, 81–67	30−39
December 29, 1971	New Hampshire	Win, 61–58	31−39
February 9, 1972	at Saint Peter's	Loss, 103–82	31−40
February 26, 1972	Iona	Win, 90–88^{3OT}	32−40
January 17, 1973	at Iona	Win, 60–58	33−40
February 6, 1973	St. Francis (NY)	Win, 83–76	34−40
February 20, 1973	at Boston College	Loss, 88–68	34−41
January 3, 1974	Boston College	Loss, 94–75	34−42
January 5, 1974	at St. Francis (NY)	Loss, 95–76	34−43
February 20, 1974	at Buffalo	Win, 103–97	35−43
February 23, 1974	Iona	Win, 79–74	36−43
December 4, 1974	at Boston College	Loss, 113–66	36−44
December 9, 1974	Canisius	Loss, 56–53	36−45
January 14, 1975	at Iona	Win, 65–58	37−45
February 5, 1975	Buffalo	Win, 83–77^{OT}	38−45
February 15, 1975	St. Francis (NY)	Win, 79–64	39−45
December 3, 1975	at Boston College	Loss, 87–72	39−46
February 4, 1976	at Buffalo	Loss, 86–75	39−47
February 14, 1976	at St. Francis (NY)	Loss, 76–66	39−48
February 21, 1976	Iona	Win, 89–88	40−48
January 12, 1977	Boston College	Win, 89–79	41−48
January 22, 1977	St. Francis (NY)	Win, 74–66	42−48
February 12, 1977	at Canisius	Win, 61–58	43−48
February 16, 1977	Buffalo	Win, 97–87^{OT}	44−48
November 27, 1977	at Boston College	Loss, 90–70	44−49
December 2, 1977	at #12 Syracuse	Loss, 90–62	44−50
December 3, 1977	Rhode Island††	Loss, 84–57	44−51
January 21, 1978	at St. Francis (NY)	Loss, 86–72	44−52
December 3, 1978	Boston College	Loss, 83–70	44−53
January 13, 1979	St. Francis (NY)	Loss, 87–78	44−54
February 26, 1979	#6 Syracuse‡‡	Loss, 92–60	44−55
December 2, 1979	at Boston College	Loss, 86–57	44−56
December 7, 1979	at #11 Syracuse	Loss, 107–61	44−57
December 8, 1979	Hofstra††	Loss, 75–64	44−58
December 8, 1981	at Utica	Loss, 53–49	44−59
February 2, 1983	Utica	Loss, 60–59^{OT}	44−60
December 10, 1983	at Seton Hall	Loss, 87–76	44−61
February 20, 1984	at Utica	Loss, 55–50	44−62
December 8, 1984	at Seton Hall	Loss, 62–52	44−63
December 7, 1985	at Seton Hall	Loss, 74–39	44−64
December 5, 1987	at Siena	Loss, 75–70	44−65
December 3, 1988	Siena	Loss, 91–52	44−66
February 7, 1989	at Army	Win, 77–70	45−66
February 26, 1990	at Siena	Loss, 90–76	45−67
February 14, 1991	Siena	Loss, 88–75	45−68
December 4, 1991	at Siena	Loss, 81–62	45−69
December 22, 1992	at #13 Syracuse	Loss, 102–71	45−70
December 28, 1992	at Siena	Loss, 83–56	45−71
December 29, 1994	at #11 Syracuse	Loss, 94–54	45−72
November 16, 2008	at Syracuse	Loss, 85–51	45−73
December 10, 2009	at St. Bonaventure	Loss, 76–65	45−74
Home			31−21
Road			13−50
Neutral			1−3
Ranked opponents • Home • Road			0–5; 0–1; 0–4
(#) Ranking per AP Division I poll † Game played in Latrobe, Pennsylvania ‡ Game played in Jersey City, New Jersey †† Game played on neutral floor in Syracuse, New York ‡‡ Le Moyne home game played at Onondaga County War Memorial in Syracuse, New York

== Rivalry with Siena ==
Le Moyne–Siena
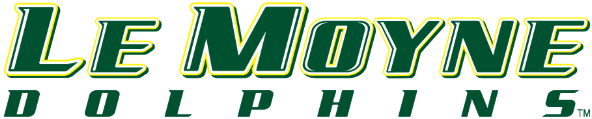
- Le Moyne Dolphins Siena Saints
- Sport: Men's basketball
- Location: Upstate New York
- First meeting: December 7, 1948; Siena 41, Le Moyne 39
- Latest meeting: December 28, 1992; Siena 83, Le Moyne 56

Statistics
- Total meetings: 62
- All-time series: Le Moyne leads, 39–23
- Largest victory: Siena, 91–52 (December 3, 1988)
- Longest win streak: Le Moyne, 8 (March 1, 1958 – December 9, 1961)
- Current win streak: Siena, 6

Before the Dolphins had ever played a varsity basketball game, Siena was identified as Le Moyne's chief rival. "BEAT SIENA!" was the front-page headline of the school newspaper on November 24, 1948, 13 days before the Dolphins' inaugural varsity game, scheduled to be played at home against Siena. A pep rally was held the night before the game and attended by the team, the head coach, the athletic director and, of course, the cheerleaders. Those organizing the rally had someone dressed as an Indian, Siena's team nickname at the time, appear to be tossed into the bonfire and burned. The rivalry was acknowledged by Siena shortly after the teams began playing, perhaps, in part, because the teams met in the 1951 National Catholic Invitational Tournament (NCIT).

Siena won the first-ever matchup, 41–39, on December 7, 1948, and went on to take the first five games between the teams, the fourth and fifth of which went to overtime, before Le Moyne broke through with a win at home followed by another victory in the NCIT, which was played on Siena's home court.

On March 5, 1955, in Syracuse, a fistfight between Le Moyne's Dan Cavellier and Siena's Tim Hill with two minutes to play in the game between the two teams resulted in the ejection of both players.

In preparation for the Dolphins' December 1, 1956 season opener at Siena, a 20-car motorcade from Syracuse to Albany was organized to transport Le Moyne supporters to the game, and plans were made to have a Le Moyne cheerleader dressed as a deceased Siena Indian and carried into the arena in a funeral procession with the pep band playing a dirge.

Despite the heated rivalry between the two schools, when Siena head coach Dan Cunha resigned after the 1959–60 season, Le Moyne head coach Tommy Niland remarked that he regarded Cunha as a very good friend who was a fine coach and would be hard to replace. Cunha withdrew his resignation in July 1960, and was 1961 MECAA coach of the year.

After Le Moyne's Gary DeYulia felt he was unnecessarily shoved out of bounds in the NCAA tournament-bound Dolphins' regular-season finale in DeWitt against Siena on February 28, 1965, a brief melee broke out between the rival teams, and a Siena player was promptly slammed to the floor by a Dolphin. It appeared it might spread into the stands where the Siena fans were sitting, but cooler heads quickly prevailed. The behavior of the Le Moyne players and fans in connection with the melee was criticized in Siena's school newspaper.

After 21 seasons as Siena's head basketball coach, Dan Cunha resigned for a second time in July 1965. Four months later, Cunha was hired as Le Moyne's new dean of men, a position with no athletic duties.

In 1976, Siena reclassified to Division I, while Le Moyne remained a Division II program. Despite Siena's move, there were plans for Siena to play at Le Moyne on January 15, 1977, and for the Dolphins to continue their series with their archrivals, reduced to one game per season. However, Siena notified Le Moyne in September 1976, that it would be unable to keep its commitment for that date. Le Moyne had no open dates on which a game with Siena could be scheduled. As a result, the two teams did not meet during the 1976–77 season, ending their annual series which started in the 1948–49 season, with the first varsity game Le Moyne ever played. The teams did not meet again for 11 years.

Le Moyne and Siena played one game annually between the 1987–88 and 1992–93 seasons, and Siena won all six of those contests. Le Moyne's 2023 reclassification to Division I creates the possibility that this rivalry may be rekindled. It has been 33 years since the teams last met in an official game. The Dolphins defeated Siena, 73–71, in an exhibition game in November 2017, at Loudonville.

Le Moyne victories	Siena victories

No.	Date	Location	Winner	Score
1	December 7, 1948	Geddes	Siena	41–39
2	January 29, 1949	Loudonville	Siena	53–31
3	November 24, 1949	Albany	Siena	46–31
4	February 15, 1950	Geddes	Siena	60–56^{OT}
5	November 23, 1950	Albany	Siena	70–68^{2OT}
6	December 30, 1950	Geddes	Le Moyne	53–47
7	March 14, 1951	Albany†	Le Moyne	57–53
8	November 22, 1951	Albany	Siena	62–41
9	January 18, 1952	Syracuse	Le Moyne	53–51
10	November 27, 1952	Albany	Siena	53–49
11	February 24, 1953	Syracuse	Le Moyne	68–65
12	December 5, 1953	Albany	Le Moyne	60–40
13	March 6, 1954	Syracuse	Siena	63–55
14	January 1, 1955	Albany	Le Moyne	64–60
15	March 5, 1955	Syracuse	Le Moyne	78–62
16	December 1, 1955	Albany	Le Moyne	78–71
17	March 2, 1956	Syracuse	Le Moyne	82–59
18	December 1, 1956	Albany	Le Moyne	74–41
19	January 19, 1957	Syracuse	Le Moyne	68–59
20	December 21, 1957	Albany	Siena	78–72
21	March 1, 1958	Syracuse	Le Moyne	58–50
22	December 20, 1958	Albany	Le Moyne	66–65^{OT}
23	February 28, 1959	Syracuse	Le Moyne	60–59
24	December 7, 1959	Albany	Le Moyne	60–46
25	February 27, 1960	Syracuse	Le Moyne	61–48
26	December 10, 1960	Loudonville	Le Moyne	49–45
27	February 25, 1961	Syracuse	Le Moyne	48–45
28	December 9, 1961	Loudonville	Le Moyne	56–48
29	February 24, 1962	Syracuse	Siena	64–57
30	December 1, 1962	DeWitt	Le Moyne	43–41
31	February 16, 1963	Loudonville	Siena	50–49
32	February 8, 1964	Loudonville	Le Moyne	54–46
33	January 30, 1965	Loudonville	Le Moyne	70–65
34	February 28, 1965	DeWitt	Le Moyne	58–48
35	January 8, 1966	Loudonville	Le Moyne	85–74
36	March 5, 1966	DeWitt	Le Moyne	88–72
37	January 14, 1967	Loudonville	Le Moyne	65–63
38	March 4, 1967	DeWitt	Siena	61–60
39	December 16, 1967	Loudonville	Le Moyne	101–89
40	March 2, 1968	DeWitt	Le Moyne	82–70
41	December 19, 1968	DeWitt	Le Moyne	92–73
42	March 1, 1969	Loudonville	Le Moyne	85–74
43	January 21, 1970	Loudonville	Le Moyne	87–74
44	March 7, 1970	DeWitt	Le Moyne	84–77
45	January 20, 1971	DeWitt	Le Moyne	82–57
46	March 6, 1971	Albany	Siena	77–72
47	January 29, 1972	Loudonville	Le Moyne	72–67
48	March 4, 1972	DeWitt	Le Moyne	74–70
49	January 27, 1973	DeWitt	Le Moyne	87–72
50	March 3, 1973	Albany	Siena	65–61
51	January 26, 1974	Albany	Siena	101–79
52	March 2, 1974	DeWitt	Le Moyne	87–81
53	January 25, 1975	DeWitt	Le Moyne	73–67
54	March 1, 1975	Loudonville	Siena	92–74
55	January 24, 1976	Loudonville	Siena	79–68
56	March 4, 1976	DeWitt	Le Moyne	81–77
57	December 5, 1987	Loudonville	Siena	75–70
58	December 3, 1988	DeWitt	Siena	91–52
59	February 26, 1990	Loudonville	Siena	90–76
60	February 14, 1991	DeWitt	Siena	88–75
61	December 4, 1991	Loudonville	Siena	81–62
62	December 28, 1992	Loudonville	Siena	83–56
Series: Le Moyne leads 39–23
† = National Catholic Invitational Tournament; Source:

== In-season multi-team events hosted by Le Moyne ==
In 1964, Le Moyne began hosting an annual four-team Christmas invitational tournament. It was held each December through 1975, except for 1972. Le Moyne hosted tournaments in January 1984 and January and December 1985, branded as the Matt's Premium Classic for sponsorship reasons. Tournaments hosted by Le Moyne in December 1986 through 1990, were branded as the Coca-Cola Classic. The 1991 through 1993 tournaments were called the Coca-Cola/Holiday Inn Carrier Circle Classic. After a five-year hiatus, a new multi-team showcase event branded the Holiday Inn Invitational was hosted by Le Moyne in 1999. The tournament format returned in 2000, and the event was called the Holiday Inn Carrier Circle Classic. The 2001, 2002 and 2005 tournaments were called the Le Moyne College Holiday Tournament. Results of these events are shown below.

1964 Le Moyne Christmas Invitational

Third Place; December 30
Oswego State	59
Buffalo	88

Semifinals; December 29
Le Moyne	81
Oswego State	64
Buffalo	86
Saint Michael's	93

Championship; December 30
Le Moyne	68
Saint Michael's	66

Gary DeYulia of Le Moyne was named most valuable player.

1965 Le Moyne Christmas Invitational

Third Place; December 30
Kenyon	72
Southwest Texas State	97

Semifinals; December 29
Le Moyne	84
Kenyon	73
Hartwick	81
Southwest Texas State	63

Championship; December 30
Le Moyne	53
Hartwick	52

Dan Parham of Hartwick was named most valuable player.

1966 Le Moyne Christmas Invitational

Third Place; December 29
Maine	67
Lafayette	62

Semifinals; December 28
Le Moyne	85
Maine	74
Iona	66
Lafayette	58

Championship; December 29
Le Moyne	45
Iona	59

Bob La Russo of Iona was named most valuable player.

The all-tournament team selected by members of the media covering the tournament included:

- Bob La Russo, Iona
- Bob McMahon, Iona
- Gerry McDermott, Le Moyne
- Terry Carr, Maine
- Bob Kiriloff, Lafayette

1967 Le Moyne Christmas Invitational

Third Place; December 29
Vermont	66
St. Francis (NY)	72

Semifinals; December 28
Le Moyne	95
Vermont	74
Bucknell	84
St. Francis (NY)	81

Championship; December 29
Le Moyne	78^{OT}
Bucknell	74

Gerry McDermott of Le Moyne was named most valuable player.

The all-tournament team selected by members of the media covering the tournament included:

- Gerry McDermott, Le Moyne
- Ed Farver, Bucknell
- Tom Schneider, Bucknell
- Doug Smith, St. Francis (NY)
- Dave Lapointe, Vermont

1968 Le Moyne Christmas Invitational

Third Place; December 28
Steubenville	43
Saint Michael's	62

Semifinals; December 27
Le Moyne	101
Steubenville	81
Wagner	67
Saint Michael's	62

Championship; December 28
Le Moyne	81
Wagner	91

Ray Hodge of Wagner was named most valuable player.

The tournament all-star team selected by members of the media covering the tournament included:

- Ray Hodge, Wagner
- Bill Wolfe, Wagner
- Chuck Brady, Le Moyne
- Jay Cody, Saint Michael's
- Pat Mulligan, Steubenville

1969 Le Moyne Christmas Invitational

Third Place; December 30
Le Moyne	103
Hartwick	79

Semifinals; December 29
Le Moyne	69
Albany State (GA)	82
Assumption	107
Hartwick	91

Championship; December 30
Albany State (GA)	83
Assumption	99

Jake Jones of Assumption was named most valuable player.

The tournament all-star team selected by members of the media covering the tournament included:

- Jake Jones, Assumption
- Sam Small, Assumption
- Serge DeBari, Assumption
- Clarence Ellis, Albany State (GA)
- Phil Harlow, Le Moyne

1970 Le Moyne Christmas Invitational

Third Place; December 30
Hobart	57
Boston University	63

Semifinals; December 29
Le Moyne	78
Hobart	71
Lafayette	86
Boston University	61

Championship; December 30
Le Moyne	75
Lafayette	89

Tracy Tripucka of Lafayette was named most valuable player.

The tournament all-star team selected by members of the media covering the tournament included:

- Tracy Tripucka, Lafayette
- Ron Moyer, Lafayette
- Jay Mottola, Lafayette
- Phil Harlow, Le Moyne
- Dan Brandt, Le Moyne

1971 Le Moyne Christmas Invitational

Third Place; December 29
Alfred	51
Ohio Wesleyan	75

Semifinals; December 28
Le Moyne	95
Alfred	56
New Hampshire	60
Ohio Wesleyan	57

Championship; December 29
Le Moyne	61
New Hampshire	58

Phil Harlow of Le Moyne was named most valuable player.

The tournament all-star team selected by members of the media covering the tournament included:

- Phil Harlow, Le Moyne
- Rick May, Le Moyne
- Dave Pemberton, New Hampshire
- Erie Feragne, New Hampshire
- Jackie Brown, Ohio Wesleyan

1973 Le Moyne Christmas Invitational

Third Place; December 29
Hamilton	78
Catholic	90

Semifinals; December 28
Le Moyne	95
Hamilton	68
Potsdam State	72
Catholic	62

Championship; December 29
Le Moyne	74
Potsdam State	78

Ted Bence of Potsdam State was named most valuable player.

The all-tournament team included:

- Ted Bence, Potsdam State
- Mike Deane, Potsdam State
- Bob Braunitzer, Le Moyne
- Rick May, Le Moyne
- Mark Badger, Hamilton

1974 Le Moyne Christmas Invitational

Third Place; December 28
Muhlenberg	86
Saint Michael's	92

Semifinals; December 27
Le Moyne	78
Muhlenberg	68
Hartwick	100
Saint Michael's	70

Championship; December 28
Le Moyne	57
Hartwick	69

Reggie Rothwell of Hartwick was named most valuable player.

The all-tournament team included:

- Reggie Rothwell, Hartwick
- Bill Martin, Hartwick
- Pete Hogan, Le Moyne
- John Lauer, Le Moyne
- Ken Johnson, Saint Michael's

1975 Le Moyne Christmas Invitational

Third Place; December 30
Lincoln (PA)	69
Quinnipiac	74

Semifinals; December 29
Le Moyne	91
Lincoln (PA)	68
Bloomsburg State	90
Quinnipiac	80

Championship; December 30
Le Moyne	81
Bloomsburg State	69

John Lauer of Le Moyne was named most valuable player.

The all-tournament team included:

- John Lauer, Le Moyne
- Gary Jackson, Le Moyne
- Jerry Radocha, Bloomsburg State
- Harold Driver, Quinnipiac
- Isaac Cahoe, Lincoln (PA)

1984 Matt's Premium Classic

Third Place; January 11
Concordia (NY)	70
C.W. Post	79

Semifinals; January 10
Le Moyne	78
Concordia (NY)	61
Mansfield	56
C.W. Post	55

Championship; January 11
Le Moyne	58
Mansfield	85

Craig Cooley of Mansfield was named most valuable player.

The all-tournament team included:

- Craig Cooley, Mansfield
- Gerard Conyers, Mansfield
- James Henderson, Le Moyne
- Bobby Chestnut, Le Moyne
- Mike Clark, C.W. Post
- Keith Brown, Concordia (NY)

January 1985 Matt's Premium Classic

Third Place; January 5
Queens	64
Quinnipiac	63

Semifinals; January 4
Le Moyne	56
Queens	50
Clarion	61
Quinnipiac	57

Championship; January 5
Le Moyne	65
Clarion	55

Wright Lassiter of Le Moyne was named most valuable player.

December 1985 Matt's Premium Classic

Third Place; December 14
Pace	57
C.W. Post	81

Semifinals; December 13
Le Moyne	83
Pace	48
Slippery Rock	75
C.W. Post	64

Championship; December 14
Le Moyne	74
Slippery Rock	67

1986 Le Moyne–Coca-Cola Classic

Third Place; December 13
Bloomfield	59
Lock Haven	82

Semifinals; December 12
Le Moyne	78
Bloomfield	56
Mount St. Mary's	95
Lock Haven	90

Championship; December 13
Le Moyne	74
Mount St. Mary's	75

Paul Edwards of Mount St. Mary's was named most valuable player.

The all-tournament team included:

- Paul Edwards, Mount St. Mary's
- Mark Scallion, Mount St. Mary's
- John Moore, Mount St. Mary's
- James Henderson, Le Moyne
- Scott Hicks, Le Moyne
- Jeff Null, Lock Haven

1987 Le Moyne–Coca-Cola Classic

Third Place; December 12
Southampton	56
Mansfield	85

Semifinals; December 11
Le Moyne	87
Southampton	77
Keene State	91
Mansfield	84

Championship; December 12
Le Moyne	92
Keene State	60

Pete Jerebko of Le Moyne was named most valuable player.

The all-tournament team included:

- Pete Jerebko, Le Moyne
- Scott Hicks, Le Moyne
- Russell Barnes, Le Moyne
- Steve Kaufman, Keene State
- Garrett Broderick, Mansfield
- Daryl Cambrelen, Southampton

1988 New York Coca-Cola Classic

Third Place; December 10
Dowling	71
Lowell	90

Semifinals; December 9
Le Moyne	84
Dowling	70
Cheyney	69
Lowell	52

Championship; December 10
Le Moyne	65
Cheyney	64

1989 Coca-Cola Classic

Third Place; December 9
Davis & Elkins	79
California (PA)	100

Semifinals; December 8
Le Moyne	87
Davis & Elkins	34
Sacred Heart	83
California (PA)	67

Championship; December 9
Le Moyne	80
Sacred Heart	72

Len Rauch of Le Moyne was named most valuable player.

The all-tournament team included:

- Len Rauch, Le Moyne
- Julius Edwards, Le Moyne
- Todd Williams, Sacred Heart
- Sean Williams, Sacred Heart
- Timmy Brown, California (PA)

1990 Coca-Cola Classic

Third Place; December 8
Southampton	74
Wheeling Jesuit	62

Semifinals; December 7
Le Moyne	81
Southampton	67
West Chester	84
Wheeling Jesuit	66

Championship; December 8
Le Moyne	72
West Chester	65

Tom Herhusky of Le Moyne was named most valuable player.

The all-tournament team included:

- Tom Herhusky, Le Moyne
- Len Rauch, Le Moyne
- Jon Traywick, West Chester
- Jasen Holness, Southampton
- Dave Ealy, Wheeling Jesuit

1991 Coca-Cola/Holiday Inn Carrier Circle Classic

Third Place; December 7
Queens	69
Keene State	56

Semifinals; December 6
Le Moyne	90
Queens	50
Mansfield	76
Keene State	64

Championship; December 7
Le Moyne	92
Mansfield	69

Tom Herhusky of Le Moyne was named most valuable player.

The all-tournament team included:

- Tom Herhusky, Le Moyne
- John Haas, Le Moyne
- Barry Page, Mansfield
- Cory Wright, Queens
- Brian Nash, Keene State

1992 Coca-Cola/Holiday Inn Carrier Circle Classic

Third Place; December 12
Hilbert	76
Kutztown	67

Semifinals; December 11
Le Moyne	84
Hilbert	51
Pitt-Johnstown	84
Kutztown	83

Championship; December 12
Le Moyne	90
Pitt-Johnstown	75

Mike Montesano of Le Moyne was named most valuable player.

The all-tournament team included:

- Mike Montesano, Le Moyne
- Christian Buchholz, Le Moyne
- Derrick Myers, Pitt-Johnstown
- Kareem Allen, Hilbert
- Lock Jennings, Kutztown

1993 Coca-Cola/Holiday Inn Carrier Circle Classic

Third Place; December 11
Mount Saint Mary (NY)	72
RPI	85

Semifinals; December 10
Le Moyne	97
Mount Saint Mary (NY)	56
Mercyhurst	79
RPI	74

Championship; December 11
Le Moyne	90
Mercyhurst	81

Dan Sandel of Le Moyne was named most valuable player.

The all-tournament team included:

- Dan Sandel, Le Moyne
- Andre Dearing, Le Moyne
- Joe Girard, Le Moyne
- Rashe Reviere, Mercyhurst
- Mauro Oliva, RPI

1999 Holiday Inn Invitational

December 29
Saint Michael's	85
Roberts Wesleyan	69

December 29
Le Moyne	101
Southampton	87

December 30
Saint Michael's	94
Southampton	74

December 30
Le Moyne	96
Roberts Wesleyan	91

Jakub Hrabovský of Le Moyne was named most valuable player.

2000 Holiday Inn Carrier Circle Classic

Third Place; December 30
Southern Vermont	58
Roberts Wesleyan	85

Semifinals; December 29
Le Moyne	96
Southern Vermont	66
Hartwick	83
Roberts Wesleyan	75

Championship; December 30
Le Moyne	90
Hartwick	65

Jamie McArdle of Le Moyne was named most valuable player.

The all-tournament team included:

- Jamie McArdle, Le Moyne
- Brett Barnard, Le Moyne
- Kyle Chapman, Le Moyne
- Josh Brown, Hartwick
- David Orr, Hartwick
- Jamie Dell, Roberts Wesleyan

2001 Le Moyne College Holiday Tournament

Third Place; December 29
Alfred	77
Mercy	66

Semifinals; December 28
Le Moyne	70
Alfred	55
Roberts Wesleyan	92
Mercy	75

Championship; December 29
Le Moyne	86
Roberts Wesleyan	78

Flagan Prince of Le Moyne was named most valuable player.

The all-tournament team included:

- Flagan Prince, Le Moyne
- Brett Barnard, Le Moyne
- Rob Thorpe, Le Moyne
- James Floyd, Roberts Wesleyan
- Joe Rebisz, Roberts Wesleyan
- E.J. Docteur, Alfred

2002 Le Moyne College Holiday Tournament

Third Place; December 29
Roberts Wesleyan	71
C.W. Post	69

Semifinals; December 28
Le Moyne	84
Roberts Wesleyan	81
Brockport	65
C.W. Post	64

Championship; December 29
Le Moyne	72
Brockport	77

Bob Skoczylas of Brockport was named most valuable player.

The all-tournament team included:

- Bob Skoczylas, Brockport
- Brandon Mills, Brockport
- Kellan Skrine, Brockport
- Jason Coleman, Le Moyne
- Nick Dooley, Le Moyne
- James Floyd, Roberts Wesleyan

2005 Le Moyne College Holiday Tournament

Third Place; December 30
Green Mountain	43
Clarkson	69

Semifinals; December 29
Le Moyne	107
Green Mountain	37
Baruch	75
Clarkson	60

Championship; December 30
Le Moyne	72
Baruch	65

Corey Smith of Le Moyne was named most valuable player.

The all-tournament team included:

- Corey Smith, Le Moyne
- Jason Holmes, Le Moyne
- Sid Pond, Le Moyne
- Cheick Fadika, Baruch
- Louie Karis, Baruch
- EJ Harrison, Clarkson

== Honorees ==
Le Moyne has 43 men's basketball players, coaches and contributors honored in the Le Moyne Athletic Hall of Fame. In addition, three of Le Moyne's men's basketball teams have been inducted into the Hall of Fame.

=== Honored players ===
Name	Years	Awards and achievements
Joe Boehm	1947–51	Captain of inaugural 1947–48 freshman team; served as the first arena announcer in the Le Moyne Events Center from 1962 through at least 1976
John Caveny	1959–62	Captain of the 1961–62 team, second-team 1961 MECAA All Star
Tom Cooney	1961–64	1964 Le Moyne College Athlete of the Year; co-captain and starting point guard on 1964 NCAA tournament team at 5'8"; head coach from 1973 to 1979
Gary DeYulia	1963–66	All-MECAA, All-ECAC, First Team Catholic College All-American, Honorable Mention College All-American, played in three NCAA tournaments
Bob Dietz	1953–56	Scored 1,085 career points
Tom Downey	1967–70	All-ECAC; starting point guard on 1968 and 1969 NCAA tournament teams; selected All-ECAC College Division East in 1968, All-ECAC College Division in 1969 and 1970, and honorable mention College Division All-American in 1969; captain of 1969–70 team
Laurence Ekperigin	2006–10	Le Moyne's career scoring and rebounding leader with 1,966 points and 1,171 rebounds; the only Le Moyne player named first team all-conference in three consecutive seasons
Tom Fletcher	1975–79	Excellent ball handler, who averaged almost 10 points and four rebounds per game; also pitched for Le Moyne's baseball team
Paul Galvin	1980–84	Le Moyne's all-time leader in career assists with 602
Jene Grey	1975–79	1,729 points and 969 rebounds for his career, both of which ranked him second in program history at the time his collegiate career ended; co-captain during both his junior and senior seasons
Don Guido	1968–69	Elected primarily for his accomplishments in baseball; played varsity basketball as a sophomore on the 1969 NCAA tournament team
Phil Harlow	1969–73	Regarded by many as the best player in program history; team captain for three years; ended his career as the program's all-time leading career scorer; scored 41 points on February 18, 1971, to match the program's single-game record; second-team New York State College Division All-Star in 1971 and 1972 1972 ECAC Division II All-Star; named first-team District II All-Star by the NABC. honorable mention for the College Division All-New York State team
James Henderson	1983–87	1,554 points, 722 rebounds and 118 blocked shots for his career
Scott Hicks	1984–88	1988 Rev. John J. O'Brien Award for Le Moyne College Male Athlete of the Year, All-MECC, All-Northeast Region, Co-Captain, had 1,470 points, 627 rebounds, 320 assists and 178 steals for his career, head coach from 1992 to 1997
Billy Jenkins	1950–53	Scored 1,063 points in three varsity seasons
Pete Jerebko	1984–88	1988 MECC Player of the Year, co-captain of 1987–88 team, 1,736 points, 731 rebounds and 117 steals for his career
Dick Kenyon	1952–56	1,378 career points in four varsity seasons
Wright Lassiter	1981–85	1985 Rev. J.J. O'Brien Male Senior Athlete Achievement Award, 1,260 points and 895 rebounds for his career
John Lauer	1973–77	Quiet leader who was also a prolific scorer and rebounder; known to his teammates as "Cakes", was team captain as a senior in 1976–77; finished his career as the program's fourth all-time career scorer
Dave Lozo	1947–51	Scored 1,100 points for his career
Dick Lynch	1957–60	1,150 career points
Ronnie Mack	1954–57	1956–57 team captain; 1957 Le Moyne College Athlete of the Year
Rick May	1970–74	Left the program as its all-time leading rebounder with 1,028, scored 1,224 points for his career, averaged a double-double over his career
Mike Montesano	1991–95	1995 Division II All-American, scored 1,759 points for his career, set program single-season point scoring record with 646 in 1994–95
Tom Mullen	1963–66	Played in two NCAA tournaments, 1965 and 1966 All-MECAA, led Le Moyne in rebounding 1964–65 and 1965–66, MECAA leading scorer in 1965–66, 1966 ECAC All-Star
Dick Myers	1961–64	Starter on 1964 NCAA tournament team
Flagan Prince	2001–03	2003 All-NE10 First Team, 2003 NABC All-America Honorable Mention, led team in scoring and rebounding in both of his seasons
Len Rauch	1987–91	1991 MECC Player of the Year, four-time All-MECC Team, career totals of 1,876 points, 1,151 rebounds and 509 assists
Dick Reddington	1956–57	Le Moyne College Athletic Achievement Award; elected primarily for his accomplishments as goalkeeper on the soccer team from 1956–59; appeared in games for the varsity basketball team as a sophomore, when the team was shorthanded due to injuries
Don Savage	1947–51	Three years as varsity team captain, including the 1950–51 team that had a historic turnaround from an 0–5 start to capture third place in the National Catholic Invitational Tournament, Le Moyne's first significant postseason appearance
Bill Stanley	1959–62	1961 MECAA All-Star, averaged over 10 rebounds per game at 6'2"
Adam Stockwell	1992–96	Captain and leading scorer for 1995–96 team that went to NCAA tournament, Division II All-America Honorable Mention, averaged 21.1 points and 5.6 rebounds for his senior season
John Tomsich	1995–99	1999 Rev. J.J. O’Brien Senior Athlete Award, 1999 NABC All-America Second Team, led team in scoring each of his last three seasons, career totals of 1,760 points and 1,015 rebounds, left program as leader in career blocked shots with 264, averaged 21.1 points and 11.7 rebounds as a senior, played in two NCAA tournaments
Ralph Yahn	1961–64	Co-captain and leading rebounder on 1964 NCAA tournament team

=== Honored coaches ===
Names	Years	Awards and achievements
John Beilein	1983–1992	1988 NCAA tournament appearance, 1988 MECC Coach of the Year, 1984 and 1988 MECC regular-season titles, 1988 MECC tournament title
Jim "Duke" McGrath	1958–1998	Played on 1958–59 freshman team, graduated in class of 1962, and went on to a storied career as a high school basketball coach; was serving Le Moyne as volunteer assistant coach as of 1998, the time of his Hall of Fame induction
Tommy Niland	1947–1990	Le Moyne's first varsity head coach, first freshman team head coach and first athletic director, coached varsity team for 25 seasons, program's all-time leader in wins as a head coach with 324 and NCAA tournament appearances with seven, also served Le Moyne as varsity baseball head coach

=== Others honored ===
Name	Years	Notes
1959–60 Le Moyne Dolphins men's basketball team	1959–60	Earned a berth in the NCAA tournament, finishing with a 13–5 record, won Le Moyne's first MECAA championship
1987–88 Le Moyne Dolphins men's basketball team	1987–88	Earned Le Moyne's first berth in an NCAA tournament in 19 years, finishing with a 24–6 record, a new high win total for the program; won MECC regular-season and tournament championships
1995–96 Le Moyne Dolphins men's basketball team	1995–96	Earned a berth in the NCAA tournament, finishing with a 24–6 record, matching the highest win total for the program; won NECC tournament championship
Don Familo	1992–present	Color commentator for Le Moyne basketball radio and video streaming broadcasts
Chris Granozio	1992–present	Play-by-play commentator for Le Moyne basketball radio and video streaming broadcasts
John "Doc" Joiner	1977–2015	Le Moyne employee for 38 years; first athletic trainer from 1977 to 1986; also served as building supervisor for the recreation center, Le Moyne's first athletic equipment manager, transportation coordinator and volunteer strength coach
Claude "Red" Parton	1950–55, 1956–57	Play-by-play commentator for Le Moyne basketball radio broadcasts
Dick Rockwell	1969–2007	Inducted in 1988, for his accomplishments as Le Moyne's baseball coach; served as athletic director from 1990 to 2007
Bernie Quinn	1947–51	First team manager, including manager of the 1947–48 freshman team, business manager for Le Moyne Athletic Association from 1949 to 1951; served as the first timekeeper in the Le Moyne Events Center from 1962 through at least 1987

== Awards ==
Conference Coaches of the Year

- Tommy Niland – 1959, 1960, 1962, 1964, 1965
- John Beilein – 1988
- Patrick Beilein – 2017, 2018
- Nate Champion – 2020

Conference Players of the Year

- Bill Stanley – 1962
- Gary DeYulia – 1966
- Pete Jerebko – 1988
- Len Rauch – 1991
- Laurence Ekperigin – 2009

Conference Freshmen/Rookies of the Year

- Len Rauch – 1988
- Joe Girard – 1991
- Mike Montesano – 1992
- Trent Morgan – 2005

Conference tournament MVPs

- Bill Stanley – 1960 (Note: This tournament was conducted during the 1960–61 season and was not a postseason tournament.)
- Pete Jerebko – 1988
- Dave Ingram – 1996
- Rob Atene – 1997
- Isaiah Eisendorf – 2018

Postseason tournament Most Outstanding Players

- Don Savage – 1950, 1951
- Bill Jenkins – 1952

== Dolphins playing professionally ==
=== Dolphins in the NBA ===
Dolphins playing in or drafted by the NBA
NBA draft selections
Total players selected:	7
No. 1 picks:	0
Lottery picks:	0
First round:	0
Appeared in NBA games:	1

Name	Height	Weight (lb)	Hometown	High school	Draft year	Round	NBA team	Played in NBA
John Caveny	6'0"	180	Syracuse, New York	St. John the Evangelist High School	1962	12th	St. Louis	
Jene Grey	6'4"	190	Brooklyn, New York	Sidney High School	1979	7th	San Diego	
Bill Jenkins	6'0"	180	Syracuse, New York	St. Vincent de Paul High School	1953	6th	Syracuse	
Dick Kenyon	6'3"	170	Syracuse, New York	East Syracuse High School	1956	12th	Syracuse	
Dick Lynch	6'4"	175	Fayetteville, New York	Manlius High School (Note: Lynch attended Manlius High School, which fielded a combined basketball team with Fayetteville High School, during his two varsity seasons (1954–1956). The two schools merged in 1963.)	1960	8th	Syracuse	
Chuck Sammons	6'3"	200	Syracuse, New York	St. Vincent de Paul High School	1961	11th	Syracuse	
Don Savage	6'3"	205	Manlius, New York	Manlius Military Academy	1951	2nd	Syracuse	✓

=== Dolphins currently playing overseas ===
As of October 29, 2025, five former Le Moyne players are currently playing professionally overseas.

Le Moyne seasons	Player	Hometown	Team	League
2023–24	Kaiyem Cleary	Manchester, England	Manchester Basketball	(United Kingdom) Super League Basketball
2021–22	Christian Davis	Denver, Colorado	Kauhajoki Karhu	(Finland) Korisliiga
2016–17 to 2017–18	Isaiah Eisendorf	Los Angeles, California	Maccabi Ironi Ramat Gan	(Israel) Israeli Basketball Premier League
2015–16 to 2017–18	Tyquan Rolon	Syracuse, New York	Piratas de Quebradillas	(Puerto Rico) Baloncesto Superior Nacional (BSN)
2024–25	Zek Tekin	Istanbul, Türkiye	Galatasaray S.K.	(Turkey) Turkish Super League

== Facilities ==
The Le Moyne Dolphins have played home games in five different venues, since the inception of the program, and have an all-time home record of 639–282. Le Moyne's home record by venue through the end of the 2024–25 season is summarized as follows:

Venue	Seasons	Wins	Losses	Pct.
State Fair Coliseum	1948–49 to 1950–51	15	8	.652
Onondaga County War Memorial	1951–52, 1955–56 to 1956–57 (Note: One home game was played at the venue during each of the 1954–55, 1978–79 and 2000–01 seasons.)	13	13	.500
North Syracuse High School (Note: Alternate home venue when Onondaga County War Memorial was not available.)	1951–52	2	1	.667
West Jefferson Street Armory	1952–53 to 1954–55, 1957–58 to 1961–62	57	17	.770
Ted Grant Court at the Le Moyne Events Center	1962–63 to present	552	243	.694
Totals	1948–49 to 2024–25	639	282	.694

=== State Fair Coliseum (1948–1951) ===
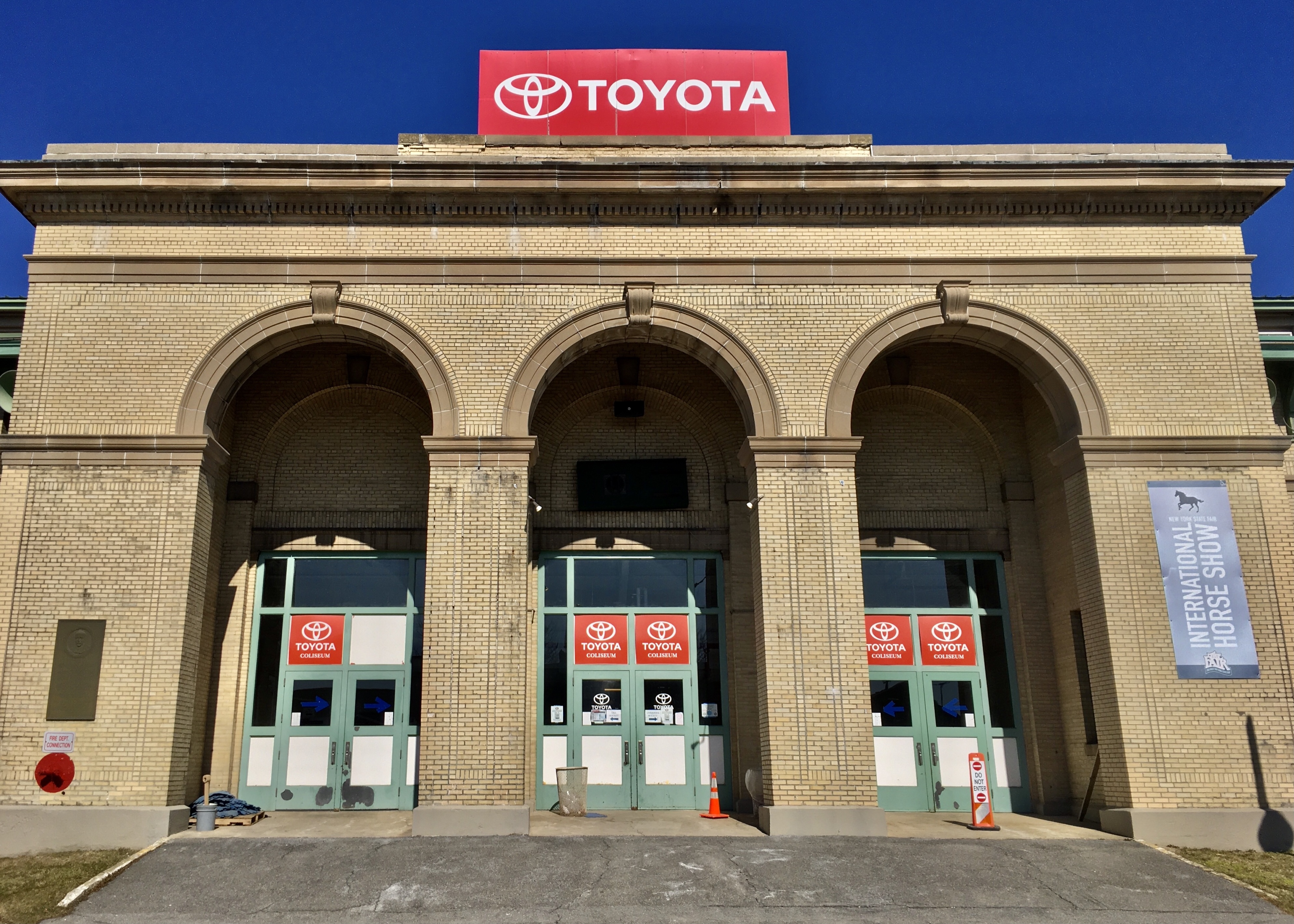
Toyota Coliseum in 2021.

The Dolphins' first home venue was the State Fair Coliseum, now known as the Toyota Coliseum, at 581 State Fair Boulevard in Geddes, New York, which they shared with the Syracuse Nationals and the Syracuse Orange. The Nationals moved into the Coliseum from the West Jefferson Street Armory for the 1948–49 season, their final campaign in the National Basketball League before that circuit's merger with the Basketball Association of America formed the NBA. The Orangemen moved into the Coliseum in 1947, after their on-campus gymnasium was destroyed by fire. The Orange played their 1946–47 home games in the West Jefferson Street Armory, after a Syracuse city engineer issued an order that prohibited gatherings in the on-campus gym of more than 792 people due to inadequate fire exits. The Coliseum had a seating capacity of 7,500 for basketball.

=== Onondaga County War Memorial (1951–1952, 1955–1957) ===
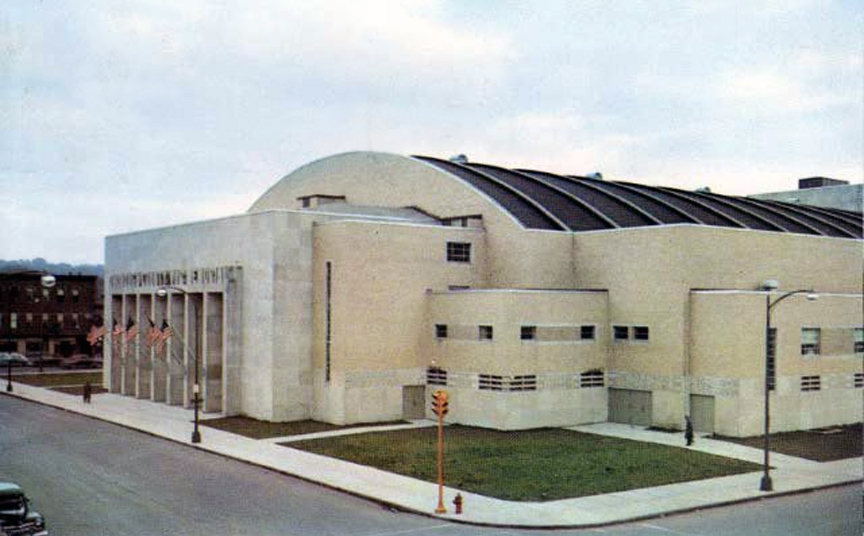
Onondaga County War Memorial in 1954.

The Dolphins, along with the Nationals and the Orange, moved into the new Onondaga County War Memorial, now known as the Upstate Medical University Arena, at 800 South State Street in Syracuse for the 1951–52 season. The arena had a seating capacity for basketball of 7,200.

After one season at the War Memorial, Le Moyne moved their home games to the West Jefferson Street Armory in 1952. They returned to the War Memorial for the 1955–56 season, when they reached an agreement with the Syracuse Orange pursuant to which the two schools scheduled their home games as doubleheaders. Le Moyne withdrew from the agreement after the 1956–57 season and returned to the Armory.

=== North Syracuse High School (1951–1952) ===
When the Dolphins changed their primary home venue from the State Fair Coliseum to the Onondaga County War Memorial for the 1951–52 season, the War Memorial was not available for all scheduled home games. North Syracuse High School's gymnasium, located at 205 South Main Street in North Syracuse, was used to host three of Le Moyne's games, including their home opener and home finale, as an alternate venue. The gym had a seating capacity of 600 for basketball.

North Syracuse High School moved to a new building in 1955, and the building that formerly housed the school became Main Street Elementary School. As of 2025, the building houses the North Syracuse Early Education Program.

=== West Jefferson Street Armory (1952–1955, 1957–1962) ===
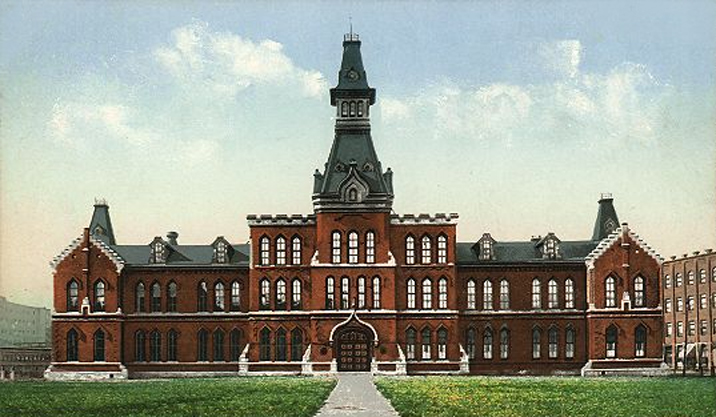
West Jefferson Street Armory depicted on a 1908 postcard.

The Dolphins moved their home games to the West Jefferson Street Armory at 236 West Jefferson Street in Syracuse for the 1952–53 season. After three seasons at the Armory, Le Moyne returned to the War Memorial for two seasons. The Dolphins moved their home games back to the Armory for the 1957–58 season, and were based at the venue until their on-campus fieldhouse was built in 1962. The Armory's seating capacity was 3,000. Portable bleachers could expand the seating capacity to 5,000.

The Armory building now houses the Milton J. Rubenstein Museum of Science and Technology.

=== Le Moyne Events Center (1962–present) ===
The Le Moyne Dolphins presently play their home games on Ted Grant Court in the 2,637-seat Le Moyne Events Center; the seating capacity for basketball reported to the NCAA is 2,000.

Ground was broken on construction of the Events Center in March 1961, and the arena opened on December 1, 1962, with a varsity basketball game featuring Le Moyne versus archrival Siena. The varsity game against Siena was the nightcap of a doubleheader that opened with Le Moyne's freshman team defeating Powelson Business Institute, 65–47. The arena underwent a significant renovation in 2016, and reopened on October 12 of that year.

The Events Center hosted regional games of the 1965, 1966, 1969, 2017 and 2018 NCAA College Division/Division II tournaments.
