= Paul Sather =

American college basketball coach

Current position
- Title: Head coach
- Team: North Dakota
- Conference: Summit League
- Record: 94–135 (.410)

Biographical details
- Born: August 28, 1971 (age 55); Minneapolis, Minnesota, U.S.
- Education: Northern State University; Wayne State College

Playing career
- 1990–1994: Northern State

Coaching career (HC unless noted)
- 1996–1997: Sidney HS (assistant)
- 1997–1998: Wayne State (NE) (GA)
- 1998–2004: Northern State (assistant)
- 2004–2005: Colorado (assistant)
- 2005–2010: Black Hills State
- 2010–2019: Northern State
- 2019–present: North Dakota

Head coaching record
- Overall: 376–286 (.568)
- Tournaments: 5–3 (NCAA Division II); 3–2 (NAIA)

Accomplishments and honors

Championships
- As a coach: 2 NSIC regular season (2018, 2019); 2 NSIC tournament (2018, 2019); 2 NSIC North Division (2018, 2019); 2 DAC regular season (2009, 2010); DAC tournament (2009); As an athlete: NSIC regular season (1993)

Awards
- 2× NSIC Coach of the Year (2018, 2019); NABC Central Region Coach of the Year (2018); DAC Coach of the Year (2009)

Paul Robert Sather (born August 28, 1971) is an American college basketball coach, currently head men's basketball coach at the University of North Dakota.

== Early life ==
Sather, from Princeton, Minnesota, played college basketball for Northern State in Aberdeen, South Dakota from 1990 to 1994. While there, he helped lead the Wolves to a NSIC regular season championship in 1993, as well as back–to–back appearances in the NAIA Division II national championship game in 1993 and 1994.

== Coaching career ==
=== Early coaching career ===
Following his college career, he entered coaching, first as an assistant coach at Sidney High School in Nebraska, then as a graduate assistant at Wayne State College under Greg McDermott, where he also obtained a master's degree in sports administration. In 1998, Sather returned to Northern State as an assistant coach where he served for six years, the first season being under head coach Bob Olson and the rest being under head coach Don Meyer. For the 2004–05 season, Sather joined Ricardo Patton’s staff at Colorado.

=== Black Hills State ===
In 2005, Sather was named head coach of Black Hills State University in Spearfish, South Dakota. In his five seasons at Black Hills State, he led the Yellow Jackets to a 94–62 record. His 2008–09 team went 30–5, setting a school season record for wins as well as winning the DAC regular season and tournament championships. In the 2008–09 season, he also won the DAC Coach of the Year. His 2009–10 team finished 21–10, winning the DAC regular season championship with a 10–3 record. The Yellow Jackets would make their second straight appearance in the NAIA Division II tournament, losing in the first round to the Saint Francis Cougars by a score of 86–83. Following the season, four players were named to the DAC All-Conference team, Luke Enos, Cain Atkinson, Will John Johnson, and Clay Pottorff. Will John Johnson was named as the DAC Defensive Player of the Year and Cain Atkinson was named as an NAIA Honorable Mention All-American. Luke Enos was also named as the DAC Player of the Year and was named as an NAIA First Team All-American.

In 2023, the 2008–09 team was inducted in the Black Hills State Athletics Hall of Fame. On September 25, 2026, Sather was also individually inducted in to the Black Hills State Athletics Hall of Fame.

=== Northern State ===
Sather was then hired to lead the program at his alma mater, Northern State, replacing Don Meyer. The Wolves made their first postseason appearance under Sather in 2015, where they would end up losing to Central Missouri in the first round of the 2015 NCAA Division II men's basketball tournament. During the 2017–18 season, the Wolves finished 36-4 and set a school record for single season wins and consecutive wins with 18, as well as winning the NSIC regular season championship for the first time since the 2002–03 season, the NSIC tournament for the first time since 2005, and their first ever NSIC North Division title. That season, they made it to the championship game of the 2018 NCAA Division II tournament for the first time in school history, narrowly losing to Ferris State by a score of 69–71. Following the season, four players were named to the NSIC All–Conference team and Sather was awarded his first NSIC Coach of the Year award. The Wolves finished the 2018–19 season with a overall record of 26–7 (18–4 NSIC) and won their second consecutive NSIC regular season, tournament, and North Division championship. They also made a second consecutive appearance in the NCAA Division II men's basketball tournament, where they would lose to Southeastern Oklahoma State in the first round by a score of 103–115. Following the season, Sather was named the NSIC Coach of the Year for the second consecutive year.

During his nine seasons at Northern State, Sather led 18 NSIC All–Conference selections, one Academic All–American, and accumulated an overall record of 188–89.

=== North Dakota ===
On May 30, 2019, Sather was announced as the new head coach for the North Dakota Fighting Hawks of the Summit League. He picked Jamie Stevens and Zach Horstman, who were assistants under him at Northern State, as assistant coaches. During his first season, Sather led the Fighting Hawks to the Summit League tournament championship game for the first time in school history, subsequently losing to North Dakota State. Earlier that season, he also led the Fighting Hawks to their first win against a Big Ten Conference opponent since 1933, defeating the Nebraska Cornhuskers by a score of 75–74. On March 14, 2023, it was announced that Sather was hired to a two year extension through the 2025–26 season. On February 18, 2026, it was announced that Sather received a three year extension through the 2028–29 season. In 2026, the Fighting Hawks made their second appearance in the Summit League tournament championship game, but would lose to North Dakota State by a score of 62–70.

== Awards and honors ==
NAIA

- Two-time DAC Regular Season Champion – 2009, 2010
- DAC Tournament Champion – 2009
- DAC Coach of the Year – 2009

NCAA

- Two-time NSIC Regular Season Champion – 2018, 2019
- Two-time NSIC Tournament Champion – 2018, 2019
- Two-time NSIC North Division Champion – 2018, 2019
- Two-time NSIC Coach of the Year – 2018, 2019
- NABC Central Region Coach of the Year – 2018

Halls of Fame

- Two-time Black Hills State Athletics Hall of Fame inductee:
  - 2023 (with the 2008–09 team)
  - 2026 (individual career)

== Head coaching record ==
Record table
Season	Team	Overall	Conference	Standing	Postseason
Black Hills State Yellow Jackets (Dakota Athletic Conference) (2005–2010)
2005–06	Black Hills State	17–14	10–4	2nd	
2006–07	Black Hills State	10–19	5–9	7th	
2007–08	Black Hills State	16–14	8–7	4th	
2008–09	Black Hills State	30–5	13–1	1st	NAIA Division II Final Four
2009–10	Black Hills State	21–10	10–3	1st	NAIA Division II First Round
Black Hills State:		94–62 (.603)	46–24 (.657)		
Northern State Wolves (Northern Sun Intercollegiate Conference) (2010–2019)
2010–11	Northern State	12–14	7–14	T–10th	
2011–12	Northern State	13–13	9–13	T–8th	
2012–13	Northern State	20–11	14–8	T–5th / 2nd (North)	
2013–14	Northern State	18–11	13–9	8th / 4th (North)	
2014–15	Northern State	23–9	15–7	4th / 2nd (North)	NCAA Division II First Round
2015–16	Northern State	18–12	13–9	4th / 2nd (North)	
2016–17	Northern State	22–8	17–5	T–2nd / 2nd (North)	
2017–18	Northern State	36–4	20–2	1st / 1st (North)	NCAA Division II Runner–Up
2018–19	Northern State	26–7	18–4	1st / 1st (North)	NCAA Division II First Round
Northern State:		188–89 (.679)	126–71 (.640)		
North Dakota Fighting Hawks (Summit League) (2019–present)
2019–20	North Dakota	15–18	7–9	6th	
2020–21	North Dakota	9–17	8–8	5th	
2021–22	North Dakota	6–25	2–16	10th	
2022–23	North Dakota	13–20	6–12	9th	
2023–24	North Dakota	18–14	10–6	T–2nd	
2024–25	North Dakota	12–21	5–11	T–6th	
2025–26	North Dakota	18–17	10–6	3rd	
2026–27	North Dakota	3–3	0–0		
North Dakota:		94–135 (.410)	48–68 (.414)		
Total:		376–286 (.568)			
National champion Postseason invitational champion Conference regular season champion Conference regular season and conference tournament champion Division regular season champion Division regular season and conference tournament champion Conference tournament champion

== Career stats ==
Legend
GP	Games played	GS	Games started	MPG	Minutes per game
FG%	Field goal percentage	3P%	3-point field goal percentage	FT%	Free throw percentage
RPG	Rebounds per game	APG	Assists per game	SPG	Steals per game
BPG	Blocks per game	PPG	Points per game	**Bold**	Career high

=== College ===
Year	Team	GP	GS	MPG	FG%	3P%	FT%	RPG	APG	SPG	BPG	PPG
1990–91	Northern State	14	0		.86		1.00	0.60	0.07	0.14	0.14	0.90
1991–92	Northern State	6	0		.33		.40	0.66	0.00	0.16	0.33	1.33
1992–93	Northern State	36	18		.58	1.00	.57	3.88	0.94	0.97	0.61	7.16
1993–94	Northern State	34	34		.59		.61	5.58	1.44	0.97	0.55	9.97

== Coaching tree ==
Assistant coaches under Sather who became NCAA or NBA head coaches

- **Sundance Wicks** – Missouri Western (2018–2020), Green Bay (2023–2024), Wyoming (2024–present)
- **Steve Smiley** – Northern Colorado (2020–present)
- **Justin Wieck** – Minnesota Duluth (2018–present)
- **Randall Herbst** – Minot State (2025–present)
- **Ty Danielson** – Northwestern Oklahoma State (2026–present)

== Personal life ==
He has two children, Sam and Becca, and a wife named Kelsie.

His son, Sam, played college football as an offensive lineman for the Northern State Wolves from 2021 to 2023 and then for the Dakota State Trojans during the 2024 and 2025 seasons. He currently serves as a graduate assistant sports information director at Dakota State University.
