= 2017–18 Northern State Wolves men's basketball team =

American college basketball season

2017–18 Northern State Wolves men's basketball
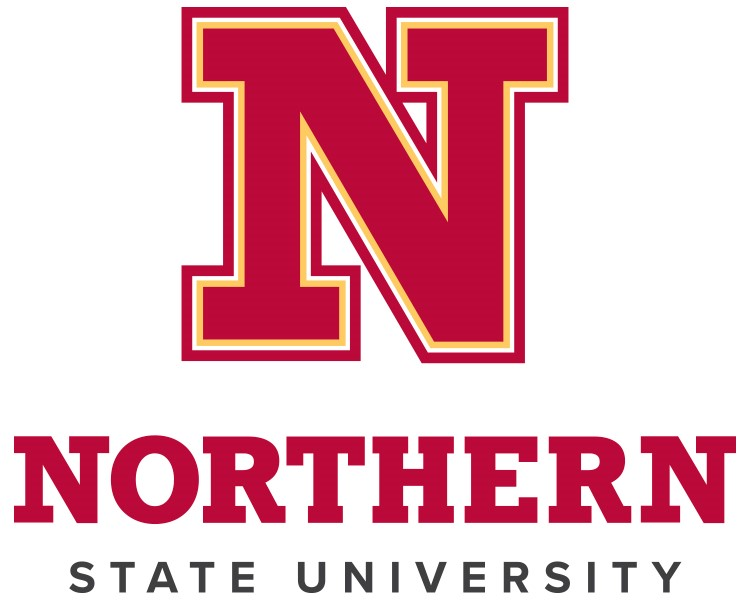

NSIC Regular Season Champions NSIC Tournament Champions NCAA Central Region Champions
- Conference: Northern Sun Intercollegiate Conference
- North
- Record: 36–4 (20–2 NSIC)
- Head coach: Paul Sather (8th season)
- Assistant coaches: Sundance Wicks; Brad Christenson; Zach Horstman
- Home arena: Wachs Arena

The 2017–18 Northern State Wolves men's basketball team represented Northern State University in the 2017-18 NCAA Division II men's basketball season. The Wolves were led by eighth year head coach Paul Sather and played their home games at Wachs Arena in Aberdeen, South Dakota. They competed as members of the Northern Sun Intercollegiate Conference. After winning the NSIC tournament, the Wolves received an automatic bid into the 2018 NCAA Division II men's basketball tournament. They were berthed with the #2 seed in the regional tournament and beat Minnesota State by a score of 90–83 to win the Central Region Tournament and move on to the Elite Eight. The Elite Eight was held in Sioux Falls, South Dakota. The Wolves beat East Stroudsburg and Queens to move on the National Championship game where they lost to the Ferris State Bulldogs by a score of 69–71.

== Previous season ==
During the previous season, the Wolves finished with a record of 22–8 (17–5 NSIC) and tied for second in the conference.

== Roster ==
2017–18 Northern State Wolves men's basketball team
Players
Coaches

Pos.	#	Name	Height	Weight	Year	Hometown
G	0	Ian Smith	5 ft 10 in (1.78 m)	165 lb (75 kg)	Jr	Brooklyn Park, Minnesota
G	1	Logan Legrand	5 ft 9 in (1.75 m)	160 lb (73 kg)	So	Aberdeen, South Dakota
G	2	Mason Stark	6 ft 2 in (1.88 m)	160 lb (73 kg)	Fr	Chandler, Arizona
G	3	Andrew Kallman	6 ft 4 in (1.93 m)	175 lb (79 kg)	Fr	Chaska, Minnesota
F	4	Brennan Carlson	6 ft 5 in (1.96 m)	190 lb (86 kg)	Fr	Brookings, South Dakota
G	5	Roko Dominovic	6 ft 4 in (1.93 m)	190 lb (86 kg)	Fr	Split, Croatia
G	11	DJ Pollard	6 ft 4 in (1.93 m)	180 lb (82 kg)	Sr	St. Louis Park, Minnesota
G/F	15	Bo Fries	6 ft 4 in (1.93 m)	195 lb (88 kg)	Jr	Langford, South Dakota
G	21	Gabe King	6 ft 5 in (1.96 m)	185 lb (84 kg)	So	Irene, South Dakota
G	22	Darin Peterka	6 ft 4 in (1.93 m)	190 lb (86 kg)	Sr	Miller, South Dakota
F	23	Justin Decker	6 ft 7 in (2.01 m)	225 lb (102 kg)	Jr	Huron, South Dakota
F	24	Parker Fox	6 ft 8 in (2.03 m)	210 lb (95 kg)	Fr	Mahtomedi, Minnesota
F	33	Cole Dahl	6 ft 7 in (2.01 m)	195 lb (88 kg)	So	Newfolden, Minnesota
F	35	Logan Doyle	6 ft 8 in (2.03 m)	225 lb (102 kg)	Sr	Alexandria, Minnesota
C	54	Carter Evans	6 ft 10 in (2.08 m)	250 lb (113 kg)	Sr	Rochester, Minnesota
G	55	Ethan Kranhold	6 ft 6 in (1.98 m)	180 lb (82 kg)	Fr	Sisseton, South Dakota

Head coach

- Paul Sather

Assistant coach(es)

- Sundance Wicks
- Brad Christenson
- Zach Horstman

Legend

- (C) Team captain
- (S) Suspended
- (I) Ineligible
- (W) Walk-on
- Injured
- Current redshirt

Roster
Last update: July 25, 2021

== Schedule and results ==
Date time, TV	Rank^{#}	Opponent^{#}	Result	Record	Site (attendance) city, state
Non-conference regular season
November 10, 2017*; 11:00 a.m.		Washburn	W 69–57	1–0	MWSU Auditorium (250); St. Joseph, MO
November 12, 2017*; 12:00 a.m.		Northwest Missouri State	L 60–71	1–1	MWSU Auditorium (403); St. Joseph, MO
November 15, 2017*; 7:30 p.m.		Southwest Minnesota State	W 81–68	2–1	R/A Facility (1443); Marshall, MN
November 17, 2017*; 7:00 p.m.		Jamestown	W 67–60	3–1	Wachs Arena (3022); Aberdeen, SD
November 20, 2017*; 7:00 p.m.		Black Hills State	W 68–46	4–1	Wachs Arena (2457); Aberdeen, SD
November 25, 2017*; 12:30 p.m.		Missouri Southern	W 81–68	5–1	Sanford Pentagon (827); Sioux Falls, SD
November 26, 2017*; 5:30 p.m.		NYIT	W 79–51	6–1	Sanford Pentagon (142); Sioux Falls, SD
NSIC regular season
December 1, 2017; 8:00 p.m.		Minot State	W 86–60	7–1 (1–0)	Minot State Dome (671); Minot, ND
December 2, 2017; 6:00 p.m.		UMary	W 75–66	8–1 (2–0)	McDowell Activity Center (849); Bismarck, ND
December 8, 2017; 8:00 p.m.		Bemidji State	W 75–54	9–1 (3–0)	Wachs Arena (3320); Aberdeen, SD
December 9, 2017; 6:00 p.m.		Minnesota Crookston	W 76–64	10–1 (4–0)	Wachs Arena (2977); Aberdeen, SD
December 15, 2017; 8:00 p.m.		MSU Moorhead	W 95–74	11–1 (5–0)	Wachs Arena (5390); Aberdeen, SD
December 19, 2017; 8:00 p.m.		MSU Moorhead	W 89–70	12–1 (6–0)	Nemzek Fieldhouse (1102); Moorhead, MN
December 30, 2017; 6:00 p.m.		Concordia–St. Paul	W 84–71	13–1 (7–0)	Gangelhoff Center (742); St. Paul, MN
December 31, 2017; 4:00 p.m.		Minnesota State	W 87–84	14–1 (8–0)	Taylor Center (972); Mankato, MN
January 5, 2018; 8:00 p.m.		UMary	W 71–55	15–1 (9–0)	Wachs Arena (3471); Aberdeen, SD
January 6, 2018; 6:00 p.m.		Minot State	W 75–56	16–1 (10–0)	Wachs Arena (3381); Aberdeen, SD
January 12, 2018; 8:00 p.m.		Wayne State	W 71–69	17–1 (11–0)	Wachs Arena (3711); Aberdeen, SD
January 13, 2018; 8:00 p.m.		Augustana	W 89–78	18–1 (12–0)	Wachs Arena (3711); Aberdeen, SD
Non-conference regular season
January 15, 2018*; 8:00 p.m.		Presentation College	W 111–73	19–1	Wachs Arena (2481); Aberdeen, SD
NSIC regular season
January 19, 2018; 8:00 p.m.		St. Cloud State	L 61–76	19–2 (12–1)	Halenbeck Hall (1327); St. Cloud, MN
January 20, 2018; 6:00 p.m.		Minnesota Duluth	W 92–71	20–2 (13–1)	Romano Gymnasium (808); Duluth, MN
January 26, 2018; 8:00 p.m.		Sioux Falls	W 97–76	21–2 (14–1)	Wachs Arena (5523); Aberdeen, SD
January 27, 2018; 6:00 p.m.		Southwest Minnesota State	L 57–64	21–3 (14–2)	Wachs Arena (5844); Aberdeen, SD
February 2, 2018; 8:00 p.m.		Upper Iowa	W 93–80	22–3 (15–2)	Dorman Memorial Gymnasium; Fayette, IA
February 3, 2018; 6:00 p.m.		Winona State	W 82–64	23–3 (16–2)	McCown Gymnasium (1012); Winona, MN
February 9, 2018; 8:00 p.m.		Minnesota Crookston	W 81–50	24–3 (17–2)	Lysaker Gymnasium (799); Crookston, MN
February 10, 2018; 6:00 p.m.		Bemidji State	W 104–76	25–3 (18–2)	BSU Gymnasium (448); Bemidji, MN
February 16, 2018; 8:00 p.m.		Minnesota Duluth	W 65–46	26–3 (19–2)	Wachs Arena (3597); Aberdeen, SD
February 17, 2018; 6:00 p.m.		St. Cloud State	W 83–63	27–3 (20–2)	Wachs Arena (4107); Aberdeen, SD
NSIC Tournament
February 21, 2018; 8:00 p.m.		Concordia–St. Paul	W 80–52	28–3	Wachs Arena (1411); Aberdeen, SD
February 24, 2018; 12:00 p.m.		Minnesota Duluth	W 75–62	29–3	Sanford Pentagon (512); Sioux Falls, SD
February 26, 2018; 12:00 p.m.		Minnesota State	W 79–78	30–3	Sanford Pentagon (553); Sioux Falls, SD
February 27, 2018; 5:00 p.m.		Southwest Minnesota State	W 81–75	31–3	Sanford Pentagon (1652); Sioux Falls, SD
NCAA Central Regional
March 10, 2018; 2:15 p.m.		Washburn	W 91–75	32–3	Bearcat Arena (790); Maryville, MO
March 11, 2018; 5:00 p.m.		St. Cloud State	W 68–61	33–3	Bearcat Arena (609); Maryville, MO
March 13, 2018; 7:00 p.m.		Minnesota State	W 90–83	34–3	Bearcat Arena (839); Maryville, MO
Elite Eight
March 20, 2018; 8:30 p.m.		East Stroudsburg	W 79–71	35–3	Sanford Pentagon (3167); Sioux Falls, SD
March 22, 2018; 8:30 p.m.		Queens	W 105–99	36–3	Sanford Pentagon (3197); Sioux Falls, SD
March 24, 2018; 2:00 p.m.		Ferris State	L 69–71	36–4	Sanford Pentagon (3538); Sioux Falls, SD
*Non-conference game. ^{#}Rankings from AP Poll. (#) Tournament seedings in parentheses. All times are in Central.
