= 2018–19 Northern State Wolves men's basketball team =

American college basketball season

2018–19 Northern State Wolves men's basketball
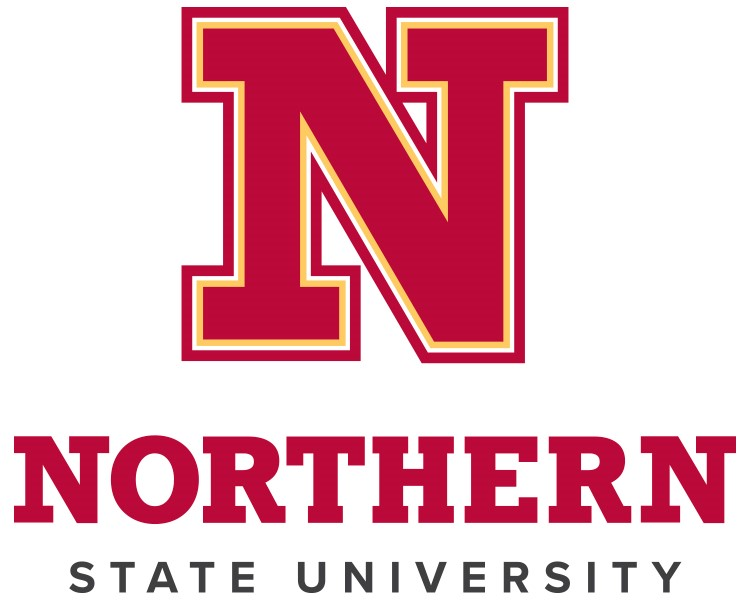

NSIC Regular Season Champions NSIC tournament champions
- Conference: Northern Sun Intercollegiate Conference
- North
- Record: 26–7 (18–4 NSIC)
- Head coach: Paul Sather (9th season)
- Assistant coaches: Jamie Stevens; Brad Christenson; Zach Horstman; Michael Cooper; Jacob Kornmann
- Home arena: Wachs Arena

The 2018–19 Northern State Wolves men's basketball team represented Northern State University in the 2018-19 NCAA Division II men's basketball season. The Wolves were led by ninth year head coach Paul Sather and played their home games at Wachs Arena in Aberdeen, South Dakota. They competed as members of the Northern Sun Intercollegiate Conference. After winning the NSIC tournament, the Wolves received an automatic bid into the 2019 NCAA Division II men's basketball tournament. They received the #2 seed in the regional tournament, but lost in the first round to Southeastern Oklahoma State in overtime by a score of 115–103.

== Previous season ==
During the previous season, the Wolves ended the season with a school record for wins (36) and appeared in the D2 national championship game for the first time in school history. They lost in the championship game to the Ferris State Bulldogs by a score of 69–71.

== Roster ==
2018–19 Northern State Wolves men's basketball team
Players
Coaches

Pos.	#	Name	Height	Weight	Year	Hometown
G	0	Ian Smith	5 ft 10 in (1.78 m)	165 lb (75 kg)	Sr	Brooklyn Park, Minnesota
G	1	Logan Legrand	5 ft 9 in (1.75 m)	160 lb (73 kg)	Jr	Aberdeen, South Dakota
G	2	Mason Stark	6 ft 2 in (1.88 m)	160 lb (73 kg)	Fr	Chandler, Arizona
G	3	Andrew Kallman	6 ft 4 in (1.93 m)	175 lb (79 kg)	So	Chaska, Minnesota
F	5	Jordan Belka	6 ft 7 in (2.01 m)	195 lb (88 kg)	Fr	Rogers, Minnesota
G	10	Roko Dominovic	6 ft 4 in (1.93 m)	190 lb (86 kg)	Fr	Split, Croatia
G	11	Augustin Reede	6 ft 2 in (1.88 m)	185 lb (84 kg)	Fr	Aberdeen, South Dakota
G	12	Ethan Kranhold	6 ft 6 in (1.98 m)	180 lb (82 kg)	So	Sisseton, South Dakota
G/F	15	Bo Fries	6 ft 4 in (1.93 m)	195 lb (88 kg)	Sr	Langford, South Dakota
G	21	Gabe King	6 ft 5 in (1.96 m)	185 lb (84 kg)	Jr	Irene, South Dakota
F	23	Justin Decker	6 ft 7 in (2.01 m)	225 lb (102 kg)	Sr	Huron, South Dakota
F	24	Parker Fox	6 ft 8 in (2.03 m)	210 lb (95 kg)	Fr	Mahtomedi, Minnesota
C	25	Lincoln Jordre	6 ft 9 in (2.06 m)	225 lb (102 kg)	Fr	Onida, South Dakota
F	33	Cole Dahl	6 ft 7 in (2.01 m)	195 lb (88 kg)	Jr	Newfolden, Minnesota
C	35	Justin Balcome	6 ft 10 in (2.08 m)	215 lb (98 kg)	Fr	Alexandria, Minnesota

Head coach

- Paul Sather

Assistant coach(es)

- Jamie Stevens
- Brad Christenson
- Zach Horstman

Legend

- (C) Team captain
- (S) Suspended
- (I) Ineligible
- (W) Walk-on
- Injured
- Current redshirt

Roster
Last update: November 3, 2021

== Schedule and results ==
Date time, TV	Rank^{#}	Opponent^{#}	Result	Record	Site (attendance) city, state
Non-conference regular season
October 23, 2018*		Waldorf (Exhibition)	W 103–66		Wachs Arena (1549); Aberdeen, SD
November 3, 2018*		Northwest Missouri State	L 70–72 OT	0–1	St. Joseph Civic Arena (1197); St. Joseph, MO
November 4, 2018*		Queens	W 87–74	1–1	St. Joseph Civic Arena (249); St. Joseph, MO
November 16, 2018*		Black Hills State	W 82–50	2–1	Sanford Pentagon (1228); Sioux Falls, SD
November 17, 2018*		South Dakota Mines	W 75–67	3–1	Sanford Pentagon (644); Sioux Falls, SD
November 23, 2018*		Truman State	L 59–61	3–2	Wachs Arena (3119); Aberdeen, SD
November 24, 2018*		Chadron State	W 66–62	4–2	Wachs Arena (2574); Aberdeen, SD
NSIC regular season
December 1, 2018		MSU Moorhead	W 70–54	5–2 (1–0)	Wachs Arena (3886); Aberdeen, SD
December 7, 2018		Bemidji State	W 84–73	6–2 (2–0)	BSU Gymnasium (293); Bemidji, MN
December 8, 2018		Minnesota Crookston	W 88–75	7–2 (3–0)	Lysaker Gymnasium (689); Crookston, MN
December 14, 2018		Minot State	W 85–72	8–2 (4–0)	Wachs Arena (2388); Aberdeen, SD
December 15, 2018		Mary	W 76–59	9–2 (5–0)	Wachs Arena (3012); Aberdeen, SD
December 19, 2018		MSU Moorhead	L 69–71	9–3 (5–1)	Memorial Auditorium (876); Moorhead, MN
January 4, 2019		Upper Iowa	W 102–73	10–3 (6–1)	Dorman Gymnasium (248); Fayette, IA
January 5, 2019		Winona State	W 79–68	11–3 (7–1)	McCown Gymnasium (981); Winona, MN
January 11, 2019		Minnesota Crookston	W 72–70	12–3 (8–1)	Wachs Arena (4327); Aberdeen, SD
January 12, 2019		Bemidji State	W 73–53	13–3 (9–1)	Wachs Arena (3762); Aberdeen, SD
January 18, 2019		Augustana	W 97–66	14–3 (10–1)	Wachs Arena (4025); Aberdeen, SD
January 19, 2019		Wayne State	L 81–84	14–4 (10–2)	Wachs Arena (3582); Aberdeen, SD
January 25, 2019		St. Cloud State	W 77–73	15–4 (11–2)	Halenbeck Hall (1535); St. Cloud, MN
January 26, 2019		Minnesota Duluth	L 70–76	15–5 (11–3)	Romano Gymnasium (537); Duluth, MN
February 1, 2019		Concordia-St. Paul	W 90–79	16–5 (12–3)	Gangelhoff Center (978); St. Paul, MN
February 2, 2019		Minnesota State	W 88–80	17–5 (13–3)	Taylor Center (1387); Mankato, MN
February 8, 2019		Sioux Falls	W 90–84	18–5 (14–3)	Wachs Arena (4778); Aberdeen, SD
February 9, 2019		Southwest Minnesota State	W 91–81	19–5 (15–3)	Wachs Arena (5083); Aberdeen, SD
February 15, 2019		Minnesota Duluth	W 72–70	20–5 (16–3)	Wachs Arena (5318); Aberdeen, SD
February 16, 2019		St. Cloud State	L 62–65	20–6 (16–4)	Wachs Arena (4125); Aberdeen, SD
February 22, 2019		Mary	W 69–64	21–6 (17–4)	McDowell Activity Center (1011); Bismarck, ND
February 23, 2019		Minot State	W 80–63	22–6 (18–4)	Minot State Dome (571); Minot, ND
NSIC Tournament
February 27, 2019		Concordia-St. Paul	W 88–65	23–6	Wachs Arena (1547); Aberdeen, SD
March 3, 2019		Sioux Falls	W 79–76	24–6	Sanford Pentagon (1722); Sioux Falls, SD
March 4, 2019		Winona State	W 77–76	25–6	Sanford Pentagon (877); Sioux Falls, SD
March 5, 2019		Southwest Minnesota State	W 72–68	26–6	Sanford Pentagon (1921); Sioux Falls, SD
NCAA Central Regional
March 16, 2019		Southeastern Oklahoma State	L 103–115 OT	26–7	Bearcat Arena (1079); Maryville, MO
*Non-conference game. ^{#}Rankings from AP Poll. (#) Tournament seedings in parentheses. All times are in Central.
