= Ryan Looney =

American college basketball coach

Current position
- Title: Head coach
- Team: Idaho State
- Conference: Big Sky
- Record: 81–132 (.380)

Biographical details
- Born: November 8, 1975 (age 50); Spokane, Washington, U.S.

Playing career
- 1996–1998: Eastern Oregon
- Position: Guard

Coaching career (HC unless noted)
- 1999–2001: UW-LaCrosse (asst.)
- 2001–2002: North Idaho (asst.)
- 2002–2004: MSU-Moorhead (asst.)
- 2004–2009: Eastern Oregon
- 2009–2016: Seattle Pacific
- 2016–2019: Point Loma
- 2019–present: Idaho State

Head coaching record
- Overall: 411–264 (.609)
- Tournaments: 3–2 (NAIA); 11–9 (NCAA DII)

Ryan Looney (born November 8, 1975) is an American college basketball coach who is currently head men's basketball coach at Idaho State University.

== Coaching career ==
Ryan Looney was formerly coach at Seattle Pacific University. In 2013-14, SPU finished with an overall record of 26–6, won the Great Northwest Athletic Conference (GNAC) regular season and tournament titles, reached as high as second in the NABC national poll, and advanced to the NCAA Division II tournament. Looney was recognized as the 2014 GNAC Coach of the Year and the 2014 NABC West Region Coach of the Year. During the 2012–13 season SPU finished with the best overall record in program history at 27–4, won the GNAC tournament championship, reached as high as second in the NABC national poll, and advanced to the NCAA Division II West Region Final. In 2011-12 his team finished 23-8 overall and reached the Sweet 16 of the NCAA Division II tournament. SPU compiled a 20–10 record in 2010-11 en route to an NCAA Division II tournament berth. The Falcons were the GNAC's last team standing in the 2010-11 playoffs after upsetting fifth ranked Central Washington 76-63 during a first-round game in Ellensburg, which they accomplished despite losing All-American point guard Chris Banchero to a mid-season knee injury. The 2009-10 West Region Player of the Year, Banchero was averaging 22.4 points and 5.6 assists per game before being sidelined for the final 19 games.

Looney led Seattle Pacific to a 22–6 record in 2009-10 and became the first coach to direct the Falcons to a conference championship in his inaugural season. Looney, who led his alma mater Eastern Oregon University to the quarterfinals of the 2009 NAIA Division II Tournament, was hired May 26, 2009 as the coach at SPU. He won his opening nine games on the SPU sidelines, the first coach to win more than his first three for the Falcons. Looney, 43, has a 330-131 (.716) career record, including a 164-51 (.763) at SPU. He was voted the 2009-10 GNAC Coach of the Year. Looney compiled a 97-53 (.647) record in five seasons with Eastern Oregon and directed EOU to back-to-back NAIA Tournament appearances in 2008 and 2009.

Looney and the Mountaineers had a breakout season in 2005–06, which produced the best record at EOU since 1969. The season was the second largest turnaround in school history. The 2005-06 Mountaineers also notched some memorable victories as well. During the 2006–07 season the Mountaineers finished with an overall record of 23–8, advanced to the finals of the 2007 Cascade Collegiate Conference (CCC) tournament, and were ranked as high as 17th in the NAIA national poll. The 2007-08 Mountaineers put together the most memorable season in program history. They finished with an overall record of 26–6, won the school's first conference championship in 38 years, advanced to the NAIA National Tournament for the first time in school history, and were ranked as high as third in the NAIA national poll. For his efforts Looney was recognized as the 2007-08 CCC Coach of the Year. The 2008-09 Mountaineers did not disappoint either. They finished with an overall record of 25–8, won the CCC championship, advanced to the Elite Eight of the NAIA tournament, and were ranked as high as sixth in the NAIA national poll.

Looney was named the 10th head men's basketball coach at Eastern Oregon University in May 2004. He came to LaGrande after two seasons as the top assistant at NCAA Division II Minnesota State University Moorhead. After graduating from EOU with a Bachelor of Science in Liberal Studies, Looney spent two seasons as a graduate assistant at NCAA Division III University of Wisconsin-La Crosse. While at UWL, Looney also obtained a Master of Science in Athletic Administration.

== Personal life ==
Ryan is married to former EOU cross country and track & field standout Julianna Morris. The two have a daughter Peyton Danielle Looney and a son Micah J. Looney.

== Head coaching record ==
Record table
Season	Team	Overall	Conference	Standing	Postseason
Eastern Oregon (CCC) (2004–2009)
2004–05	Eastern Oregon	6–20	3–15	9th	
2005–06	Eastern Oregon	17–11	10–8	5th	
2006–07	Eastern Oregon	23–8	12–6	4th	
2007–08	Eastern Oregon	26–6	16–2	1st	NAIA Second Round
2008–09	Eastern Oregon	25–8	15–5	1st	NAIA Elite Eight
Eastern Oregon:		97–53 (.647)	57–36 (.613)		
Seattle Pacific (GNAC) (2009–2016)
2009–10	Seattle Pacific	22–6	13–3	1st	NCAA Division II First Round
2010–11	Seattle Pacific	20–10	12–6	3rd	NCAA Division II Second Round
2011–12	Seattle Pacific	23–8	13–5	3rd	NCAA Division II Sweet Sixteen
2012–13	Seattle Pacific	27–4	16–2	2nd	NCAA Division II Sweet Sixteen
2013–14	Seattle Pacific	26–6	15–3	1st	NCAA Division II First Round
2014–15	Seattle Pacific	24–8	13–5	2nd	NCAA Division II Second Round
2015–16	Seattle Pacific	22–9	14–6	3rd	NCAA Division II First Round
Seattle Pacific:		164–51 (.763)	96–30 (.762)		
Point Loma (PacWest) (2016–2019)
2016–17	Point Loma	17–13	11–9	6th	
2017–18	Point Loma	21–10	15–5	3rd	NCAA Division II First Round
2018–19	Point Loma	31–5	20–2	1st	NCAA Division II National Runner-Up
Point Loma:		69–28 (.711)	46–16 (.742)		
Idaho State Bengals (Big Sky Conference) (2019–present)
2019–20	Idaho State	8–22	4–16	T–10th	
2020–21	Idaho State	13–11	8–6	T–4th	
2021–22	Idaho State	7–23	5–15	T–10th	
2022–23	Idaho State	11–21	8–10	5th	
2023–24	Idaho State	14–20	7–11	T–7th	
2024–25	Idaho State	15–15	10–8	4th	
2025–26	Idaho State	13–20	5–13	9th	
2026–27	Idaho State	0–0	0–0		
Idaho State:		81–132 (.380)	47–79 (.373)		
Total:		411–264 (.609)			
National champion Postseason invitational champion Conference regular season champion Conference regular season and conference tournament champion Division regular season champion Division regular season and conference tournament champion Conference tournament champion
