= Andy Bronkema =

American basketball coach

Current position
- Title: Head coach
- Team: Central Michigan
- Conference: MAC
- Record: 11–21 (.344)

Biographical details
- Born: February 23, 1984 (age 42); McBain, Michigan, U.S.

Playing career

Basketball
- 2002–2007: Cornerstone

Coaching career (HC unless noted)

Basketball
- 2007–2013: Ferris State (assistant)
- 2013–2025: Ferris State
- 2025–present: Central Michigan

Football
- 2005: Grand Rapids (RB)

Head coaching record
- Overall: 289–126 (.696)

Accomplishments and honors

Championships
- NCAA Division II national championship (2018); 3 GLIAC regular season (2017, 2018, 2020); 4 GLIAC tournament (2015–2018)

Awards
- NABC Division II Coach of the Year (2018); 2× GLIAC Coach of the Year (2017, 2018)

Andy Bronkema (born February 23, 1984) is the men's head basketball coach for the Central Michigan Chippewas men's basketball team.

== Early life and education ==
Bronkema is the son of Joel Bronkema, the principal of McBain High School. Andy grew up in McBain, Michigan, and his younger brother Luke is also a college basketball coach. Bronkema was a multi-sport standout at McBain High School, competing in football, basketball and baseball. He led the Ramblers to a state basketball title in 2002 in addition to a state football runner-up effort in 2001. Bronkema attended Cornerstone University, where he played on the basketball team. He led Cornerstone to two regular-season Wolverine Hoosier Athletic Conference (WHAC) Championships, one WHAC Tournament title and four national tournament appearances, including a NAIA Final Four berth. Bronkema was named team captain as a junior and senior and was a three-time named All-Conference selection. He earned the Basketball Coaches Association of Michigan Scholar-Athlete Award and finished his collegiate career with 1,725 points, 982 rebounds, 336 assists and 140 steals. Bronkema graduated from Cornerstone with a bachelor's degree in Education.

== Coaching career ==
=== Grand Rapids ===
Bronkema began his career as the running backs coach at Grand Rapids Community College in 2005 and helped the team finish as the National Junior College Athletic Association (NJCAA) Non-Scholarship National Champions.

=== Ferris State ===
In 2007, he became an assistant coach under Bill Sall at Ferris State University while also teaching elementary physical education at Crossroads Charter Academy. Bronkema was responsible for recruiting Division II Player of the Year Justin Keenan to Ferris State. In 2010, Bronkema was named Ferris State's top assistant, and he helped the Bulldogs win the GLIAC North Division Championship and reach the NCAA Division II Sweet Sixteen. In the 2011–12 season, he led Ferris State to a share of a second-straight GLIAC North Division championship. Bronkema led a camp and spotted Zach Hankins at it, offering Hankins his only scholarship offer.

In May 2013, Bronkema was named interim head coach after Sall accepted the job at Northern Michigan University. Bronkema was named head coach on June 28. He was offered the head job after the top two candidates turned it down. In his first season, Ferris State finished 10–16. The Bulldogs improved under his direction, as they finished the 2015–16 season with a 24–10 overall record and an appearance in the NCAA Division II Sweet 16. The following year, Ferris State went 28–5, won the GLIAC regular season and tournament titles, and reached the Division II second round.

In the 2017–18 season, he led Ferris State to a 38–1 record, including 19–1 in the GLIAC. The Bulldogs captured their first-ever Division II title by defeating Northern State in the championship game 71–69, and Hankins was named Most Outstanding Player. Bronkema was named 2018 National Coach of the Year by the NABC. Despite losing point guard Jaylin McFadden early in the season to a torn ACL, the 2019–20 team finished 27–6.

=== Central Michigan ===
On Monday, April 14, 2025, it was announced that Bronkema had been hired as the new head coach at Central Michigan University. In his first season, the Chippewas finished 10-21 overall and 6-12 in the Mid-American Conference. On November 5, 2026, Bronkema was placed on leave by the university and Raymoan McAfee was announced as the interim coach.

== Personal life ==
Bronkema married Jenae Mikolon in 2007 after graduating from college. They had three daughters together, Elliana, Cambria, and Seneca. The couple divorced in 2021. He is a Christian. In addition to coaching at Ferris State, he was an adjunct professor in the College of Education and Human Services.

== Head coaching record ==
Record table
Season	Team	Overall	Conference	Standing	Postseason
Ferris State Bulldogs (Great Lakes Intercollegiate Athletic Conference) (2013–2025)
2013–14	Ferris State	10–16	9–13	10th	
2014–15	Ferris State	23–9	16–6	2nd	NCAA Division II Round of 64
2015–16	Ferris State	24–10	13–9	6th	NCAA Division II Sweet 16
2016–17	Ferris State	28–5	18–3	1st	NCAA Division II Second Round
2017–18	Ferris State	38–1	19–1	1st	NCAA Division II Championship
2018–19	Ferris State	20–12	12–8	4th	
2019–20	Ferris State	27–6	16–4	1st	NCAA Division II Round of 64, cancelled due to COVID19
2020–21	Ferris State	9–11	8–8	4th	
2021–22	Ferris State	22–9	16–4	T-1st	
2022–23	Ferris State	24–9	13–5	T-2nd	
2023–24	Ferris State	28–8	12–6	3rd	NCAA Division II Elite Eight
2024–25	Ferris State	25–9	14–6	3rd	NCAA Division II first round
Ferris State:		278–105 (.726)	166–73 (.695)		
Central Michigan Chippewas (Mid-American Conference) (2025–present)
2025–26	Central Michigan	10–21	6–12	10th	
2026–27	Central Michigan	1–0	0–0		
Central Michigan:		11–21 (.344)	6–12 (.333)		
Total:		289–126 (.696)			
National champion Postseason invitational champion Conference regular season champion Conference regular season and conference tournament champion Division regular season champion Division regular season and conference tournament champion Conference tournament champion
