= Sundance Wicks =

American basketball coach (born 1980)

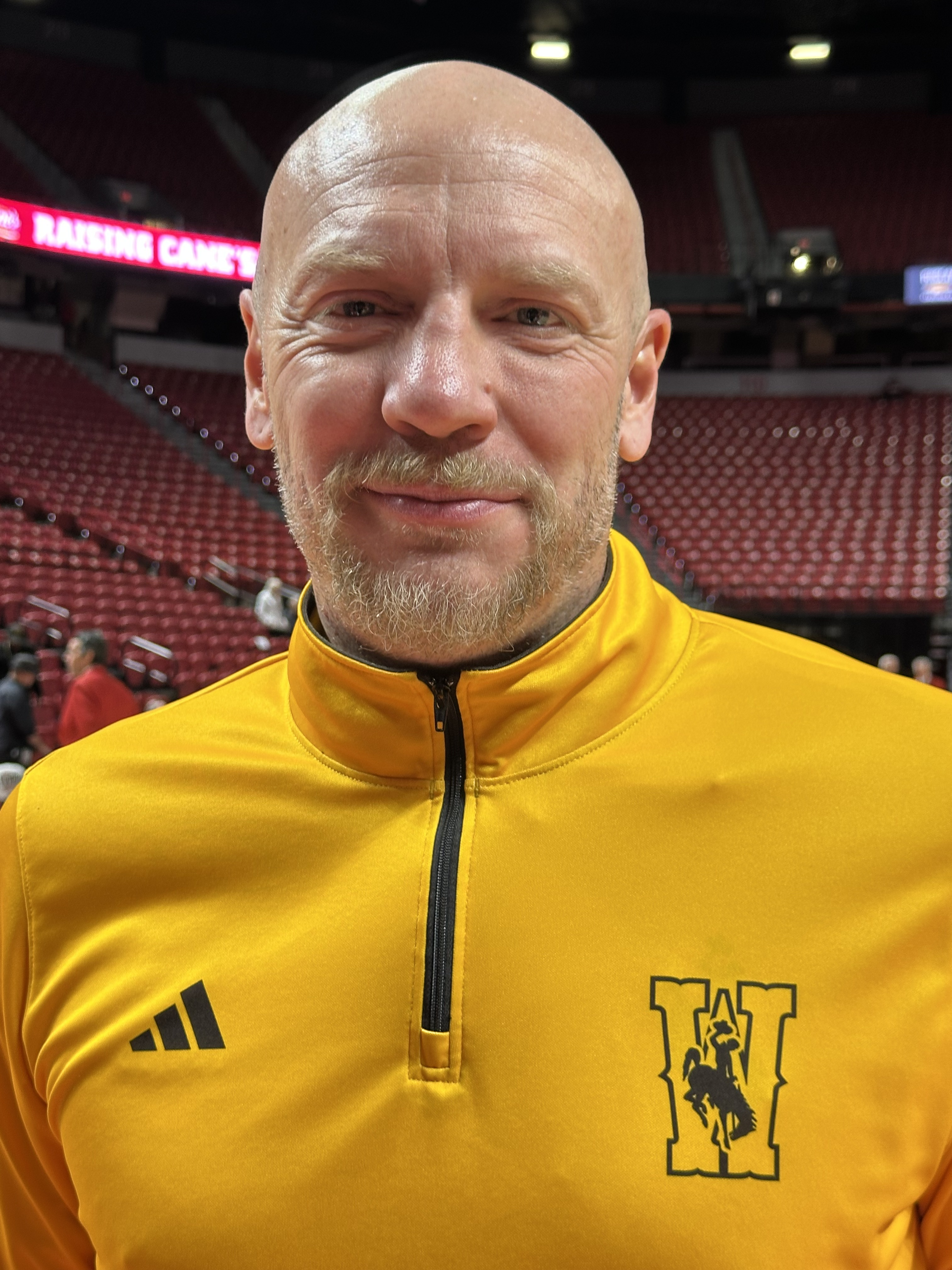
- Wicks in 2025

Current position
- Title: Head coach
- Team: Wyoming
- Conference: Mountain West
- Record: 35–36 (.493)

Biographical details
- Born: August 9, 1980 (age 46); Gillette, Wyoming, U.S.

Playing career
- 1999–2003: Northern State
- 2003–2004: Södertälje Kings

Coaching career (HC unless noted)
- 2004–2006: Northern State (GA)
- 2006–2007: Colorado (assistant)
- 2007–2011: Northern Illinois (assistant)
- 2015–2016: San Francisco (assistant)
- 2016–2018: Northern State (assistant)
- 2018–2020: Missouri Western
- 2020–2023: Wyoming (assistant)
- 2023–2024: Green Bay
- 2024–present: Wyoming

Head coaching record
- Overall: 83–82 (.503)
- Tournaments: 0–1 (NIT)

Accomplishments and honors

Awards
- Horizon League Coach of the Year (2024); NSIC Newcomer of the Year (2000); 2× First Team All-NSIC (2002, 2003)

Sundance "Sunny" Wicks (born August 9, 1980) is an American collegiate basketball coach, currently men's head coach at the University of Wyoming. He has also been the head coach for Green Bay, an assistant at Wyoming, and two years as the head coach for the Missouri Western Men's Basketball Team. Wicks spent eleven years as an assistant at four different colleges, including Northern State, Colorado, Northern Illinois, and San Francisco. Between early coaching stints, Wicks launched the Arizona Power Basketball Academy and worked as a skill-instructor and director from 2011 to 2015. He has trained notable NBA pre-draft prospects at the Impact Basketball Academy in Las Vegas, and worked with athletes such as Kawhi Leonard, Marvin Bagley, Isaiah Thomas, Xavier Silas, and Alec Burks.

== Early life ==
Wicks is the oldest of three children born to Mark and Barbara (Barb) Wicks in Gillette, Wyoming, and has athletic lineage on both sides of his family. Mark played football at Washington State from 1961–64 and one season with the New Orleans Saints. Mark Wicks is a member of the Cougars' Hall of Fame. Barb played volleyball at Black Hills State in Spearfish, South Dakota, and was on the rodeo team.

== Playing career ==
=== Northern State ===
==== Basketball ====
From 1999 to 2003, Wicks played basketball for Northern State in Aberdeen, South Dakota, under coach Don Meyer. He scored a total of 1,174 points and pulled in 665 rebounds, which is 10th all time at Northern State. He was named All-NSIC twice, all-Conference academic selection twice, and won the Clark Swisher Male Athlete of the Year once in the 2002–03 season. Wicks helped Northern State win two NSIC conference titles. Wicks has two degrees from Northern State University. In 2003 he got a bachelor’s degree in international business and in 2006 he earned a master’s degree in health, physical education, and coaching.

==== Track and field ====
Wicks was twice an All-NSIC performer in the 400-meter hurdles.

=== Södertälje Kings ===
During the 2003–04 season, Wicks played for the Södertälje Kings in Sweden. He led the team in scoring and rebounding.

== Coaching career ==
=== 2004–06 Northern State (Assistant) ===
In 2004, Wicks became a graduate assistant under coach Don Meyer for two years until 2006.

=== 2006–07 Colorado (Assistant) ===
Wicks coached under Ricardo Patton at Colorado as an assistant. He was in charge of film exchange and editing, individual workouts, in-state recruiting, as well as Ricardo Patton Basketball Camps.

=== 2007–11 Northern Illinois (Assistant) ===
In 2007, Wicks became an assistant coach for Northern Illinois for three years, and one year as the associate head coach, again under Ricardo Patton.

=== 2011–15 Arizona Power Basketball Academy ===
From 2011–15, Wicks launched the Arizona Power Basketball Academy. He built APBA from the ground up and served as a skill instructor and program director based out of Gilbert, Arizona. Wicks did not take a salary when he began APBA. Determined to succeed, he lived out of his car, showered at the gym, and slept on a beanbag.

=== 2015–16 San Francisco (Assistant) ===
Wicks served as an assistant for San Francisco for one season under head coach Rex Walters. Also on the staff was his brother, Luke Wicks.

=== 2016–18 Northern State (Assistant) ===
Wicks spent two seasons as an assistant coach for his alma mater Northern State for two seasons under head coach Paul Sather. During the 2017–18 season, Northern State compiled a record of 36–4 and were national runner-ups in the 2018 NCAA Division II men's basketball tournament.

=== 2018–2020 Missouri Western (Head coach) ===
On March 28, 2018, Wicks was named the fifth men's basketball head coach at Missouri Western. In his first season leading the Griffons, Wicks recorded a 12–18 (6–13 Conference) record. That was the best record for Missouri Western since the 2015–16 season. He has had one player make the All-Conference Second Team, Lavon Hightower, and had two players receive honorable mentions, Tyrell Carroll and Bryan Hudson.

In his second season, Wicks led the team to an 18–14 record, the best Missouri Western has had since their 2009–10 season. This included a win against a ranked opponent: Missouri Southern. They also had a home record of 12–1, losing only to number one ranked Northwest Missouri State by a score of 92–69. Tyrell Carroll received first-team ALL-MIAA and Will Eames became Missouri Western's first-ever Freshman of the Year.

=== 2020–2023 Wyoming (Assistant) ===
On March 27, 2020, Wicks resigned from Missouri Western to join Jeff Linder at Wyoming as assistant coach.

=== 2023–2024 Green Bay (Head coach) ===
On March 15, 2023, Wicks was named the ninth men's basketball head coach at Green Bay. In his first season as head coach, Wicks won the 2023–24 Horizon League Coach of the Year and the Joe B. Hall National Coach of the Year.

=== 2024–present Wyoming (Head coach) ===
On May 12, 2024, Wicks was named the 23rd men's basketball head coach at Wyoming, where he had previously served as an assistant coach for three seasons.

== Personal life ==
Wicks' sister Kelsey played basketball for the University of Notre Dame before entering the Dominican Sisters of St. Cecilia's convent in Nashville. Wicks often jokes that when they played against one another in basketball, it was "nun-on-one," and has stated that Kelsey was the best athlete in the family. She later left religious life, became executive director of the ACI Group, and in 2025 president of CatholicVote.

Wicks' brother Luke was a point guard at Northern State, and a former college basketball coach at Sheridan College, San Francisco, and Pacific. The Wicks brothers were on the same staff at San Francisco.

Wicks is a Roman Catholic and has said that he carries a Saint Benedict Medal in his pocket while coaching. He also keeps a bust of Padre Pio in his office, which he has described as a reminder to remain faithful, direct, and honest in his interactions with others.

Wicks' married his first wife, RyAnne Ridge, in 2014. His second wife, the former Courteney Steinhauser, is a former college volleyball player. They met during his second stint as a coach at Northern State and have a daughter, Grace, and son, Skywalker.

== Head coaching record ==
Record table
Season	Team	Overall	Conference	Standing	Postseason
Missouri Western Griffons (Mid-America Intercollegiate Athletics Association) (2018–2020)
2018–19	Missouri Western	12–18	6–13	12th	
2019–20	Missouri Western	18–14	13–6	4th	
Missouri Western:		30–32 (.484)	19–19 (.500)		
Green Bay Phoenix (Horizon League) (2023–2024)
2023–24	Green Bay	18–14	13–7	T–3rd	
Green Bay:		18–14 (.563)	13–7 (.650)		
Wyoming Cowboys (Mountain West Conference) (2024–present)
2024–25	Wyoming	12–20	5–15	9th	
2025–26	Wyoming	18–15	9–11	9th	NIT First Round
2026–27	Wyoming	5–1	0–0		
Wyoming:		35–36 (.493)	14–26 (.350)		
Total:		83–82 (.503)			

== Coaching tree ==
Assistant coaches under Wicks who became NCAA or NBA head coaches

- Ty Danielson – Northwestern Oklahoma State (2026–present)
