= Justin Wieck =

American basketball player and coach (born 1984)

Current position
- Title: Head coach
- Team: Minnesota Duluth
- Conference: NSIC
- Record: 166–72 (.697)

Biographical details
- Born: July 10, 1984 (age 42)

Playing career
- 2002–2004: Kirkwood CC
- 2004–2006: Iowa

Coaching career (HC unless noted)
- 2006–2008: Iowa (GA)
- 2008–2010: Iowa (video coordinator)
- 2010–2012: Northern State (assistant)
- 2012–2014: Jamestown
- 2014–2018: MSU-Moorhead (assistant)
- 2018–present: Minnesota Duluth

Head coaching record
- Overall: 191–110
- Tournaments: 6–4 (NCAA DII); 0–1 (NAIA)

Accomplishments and honors

Championships
- NSIC tournament (2026); 2 NSIC North Division (2022, 2026); NSAA regular season (2014); NSAA tournament (2014)

Awards
- NSAA Coach of the Year (2014)

Justin Wieck (born July 10, 1984) is an American college basketball coach, currently head coach for the Minnesota Duluth Bulldogs.

== Early life ==
A native of North Liberty, Iowa, Wieck attended Kirkwood Community College from 2002 to 2004, where he played basketball and earned a bachelor's degree in finance. In 2004, he transferred to the University of Iowa where he was on the All-Academic Big 10 team. He graduated with a master's degree in athletic administration.

== Coaching career ==
After graduating, Wieck served as a graduate assistant for Iowa from 2006 to 2008, then he was hired as an assistant and served as Iowa's video coordinator. In 2010, he left his alma mater to serve as an assistant coach at Northern State University under head coach Paul Sather from 2010 to 2012. During his two seasons with the Wolves, they went 25–28. In 2012, Wieck was hired as the head coach for the Jamestown Jimmies. During his two years there, the Jimmies went 25–38, winning one NSAA regular season championship and one NSAA tournament championship during the 2013–14 season. During the 2012–13 season, several games were forfeited due to an ineligible player. Wieck was named the NSAA coach of the year in 2014. In 2014, Wieck left Jamestown to serve as an assistant coach at Minnesota State University Moorhead. During his four years there, the Dragons achieved a record of 96–38 and won two NSIC regular season championships, and made three NCAA tournament appearances.

In 2018, Wieck left MSU-Moorhead to become the head coach for the Minnesota Duluth Bulldogs. Over the last eight seasons, he has achieved a record of 165–70.

== Personal life ==
He has a wife named Laura, a son named Jordy, and two daughters named Anya and Ella.

== Head coaching record ==
Record table
Season	Team	Overall	Conference	Standing	Postseason
Jamestown (NAIA independent) (2012–2013)
2012–13	Jamestown	8–26**			NAIA First Round
Jamestown (NSAA) (2013–2014)
2013–14	Jamestown	17–12	7–1	1st	
Jamestown:		25–38 (.397)	7–1 (.875)		
Minnesota Duluth (NSIC) (2018–present)
2018–19	Minnesota Duluth	17–10	14–8	T–3rd / 3rd (North)	
2019–20	Minnesota Duluth	22–9	15–7	T–3rd / 2nd (North)	
2020–21	Minnesota Duluth	6–7	5–7	6th (North)	
2021–22	Minnesota Duluth	25–6	16–4	3rd / 1st (North)	NCAA Division II First Round
2022–23	Minnesota Duluth	26–10	16–6	3rd / 3rd (North)	NCAA Division II Elite Eight
2023–24	Minnesota Duluth	26–7	18–4	T–2nd	NCAA Division II Regional Semifinals
2024–25	Minnesota Duluth	20–9	15–7	T–3rd	
2025–26	Minnesota Duluth	23–12	13–9	T–5th / 1st (North)	NCAA Division II Regional Finals
2026–27	Minnesota Duluth	1–2	0–0		
Minnesota Duluth:		166–72 (.697)	112–52 (.683)		
Total:		191–110 (.635)			
National champion Postseason invitational champion Conference regular season champion Conference regular season and conference tournament champion Division regular season champion Division regular season and conference tournament champion Conference tournament champion

**-several games were forfeited due to an ineligible player
