= 2018–19 Point Loma Nazarene Sea Lions men's basketball team =

American college basketball season

2018–19 Point Loma Nazarene Sea Lions men's basketball

PacWest regular season and tournament champions

NCAA DII West Regional champions NCAA DII tournament, Runner-up
- Conference: Pacific West Conference
- Record: 31–5 (20–2 PacWest)
- Head coach: Ryan Looney (3rd season)
- Associate head coach: Jordan Courneya
- Assistant coach: Davis Furman
- Home arena: Golden Gymnasium

2018–19 Pacific West Conference men's basketball standings
	Conf.				Overall
Team	W		L	PCT	W		L	PCT
Point Loma Nazarene	20	–	2	.909	31	–	5	.861
Concordia	18	–	4	.818	23	–	11	.676
Chaminade	16	–	6	.727	23	–	8	.742
Azusa Pacific	16	–	6	.727	20	–	11	.645
Biola*	11	–	11	.500	15	–	13	.536
Holy Names	11	–	11	.500	12	–	16	.429
Academy of Art	11	–	11	.500	11	–	17	.393
Hawaii–Hilo	10	–	12	.455	12	–	14	.462
Fresno Pacific	9	–	13	.409	12	–	15	.444
Dominican	4	–	18	.182	8	–	20	.286
Hawaii Pacific	4	–	18	.182	7	–	20	.259
Notre Dame de Namur	2	–	20	.091	2	–	26	.071
† Pacific West tournament winner * ineligible for the 2019 NCAA DII tournament due to transition period As of February 17, 2024

The 2018–19 Point Loma Nazarene Sea Lions men's basketball team represented Point Loma Nazarene University during the 2018–19 NCAA Division II men's basketball season. The team was led by third-year head coach Ryan Looney and played their home games at Golden Gymnasium in San Diego, California, as members of the Pacific West Conference (PacWest).

The Sea Lions finished 31–5, 20–2 in PacWest play to win the PacWest regular season championship. It was Point Loma Nazarene's first PacWest title in a men's sport since moving up to the NCAA Division II level in 2014–15, as well as their first conference title in men's basketball since they won the Golden State Athletic Conference title at the National Association of Intercollegiate Athletics (NAIA) level in 1986–87.

The Sea Lions won their first 14 conference games, setting a record for the best start to conference play in PacWest history. They won six of their remaining eight conference matchups to set another PacWest record with 20 conference wins, including a 106–47 blowout victory over Hawaii Pacific where they made a school-record 19 three-pointers. The Sea Lions defeated Azusa Pacific and Concordia to win the PacWest tournament championship and earn an automatic bid to the NCAA DII tournament. They received the #1 seed in the West Regional, where they defeated Western Oregon for their first-ever NCAA playoff win before beating UC San Diego and Saint Martin's to earn a spot in the Elite Eight in Evansville, Indiana. The Sea Lions defeated Queens and Southern Indiana to reach their first National Championship game, which they lost, 64–58, to Northwest Missouri State. They were the first sports team in school history to reach an NCAA National Championship game, and their 31 wins matched the school record for most in a season, which was set by the 1952–53 squad.

The Sea Lions, which ran the "swing offense" popularized by Bo Ryan, were led by redshirt junior and Western Washington transfer Daulton Hommes, who regularly attracted National Basketball Association (NBA) scouts to Point Loma Nazarene games and practices throughout the season. He was named the PacWest Player of the Year and the NABC Division II Player of the Year, among many awards.

== Previous season ==
The Sea Lions finished the 2017–18 season 21–10, 15–5 in PacWest play to finish in third place. Their 15 conference wins were the most in a season since joining the PacWest. However, they were defeated by Concordia in the quarterfinals of the PacWest tournament. The Sea Lions received an at-large bid to the NCAA DII tournament, where they were defeated by Western Oregon in the opening round of their first-ever West Regional appearance.

== Offseason ==
=== Departures ===
Departures
Name	Number	Pos.	Height	Weight	Year	Hometown	Reason for departure
Sam Linsky	12	G	6'2"	180	Freshman	Kirkland, WA	No longer on team roster
Yusuf Shehata	14	G	5'9"	175	Senior	Tucson, AZ	Graduated
Sean Dunn	15	C	6'9"	240	Freshman	Phoenix, AZ	Transferred to Cal State San Marcos
Luke Lovelady	21	F	6'8"	205	Freshman	Lakewood, WA	Transferred to Western Washington
Jacob Maga	22	F	6'4"	185	Freshman	Laguna Hills, CA	No longer on team roster
Skyler White	33	F	6'7"	220	Senior	Seattle, WA	Graduated
AJ Firey	35	G	6'2"	175	Sophomore	Santa Ana, CA	No longer on team roster

=== Incoming transfers ===
Incoming transfers
Name	Number	Pos.	Height	Weight	Year	Hometown	Previous School
Jack Hutchison	4	G	6'0"	180	RS Freshman	Plymouth, MN	Iowa State
Ben Okhotin	21	F	6'6"	210	Sophomore	San Diego, CA	Westmont
Sam Sharghi	33	G	6'1"	190	Sophomore	San Diego, CA	Roberts Wesleyan
Daulton Hommes	34	G	6'8"	215	RS Junior	Lynden, WA	Western Washington

=== 2018 recruiting class ===
College recruiting information
Name	Hometown	School	Height	Weight	Commit date
Kaden Anderson; F	Enumclaw, WA	Enumclaw High School	6 ft 8 in (2.03 m)	N/A	
Kaden Anderson; F	Recruit ratings: Rivals: 247Sports: ESPN:				
Brock Mackenzie; G	Sammamish, WA	Eastside Catholic School	6 ft 2 in (1.88 m)	N/A	
Brock Mackenzie; G	Recruit ratings: Rivals: 247Sports: ESPN:				
Zac Bulgin; G	Salem, OR	West Salem High School	6 ft 1 in (1.85 m)	N/A	
Zac Bulgin; G	Recruit ratings: Rivals: 247Sports: ESPN:				
Frank Kalinski; C	Monterey, CA	York School	6 ft 6 in (1.98 m)	N/A	
Frank Kalinski; C	Recruit ratings: Rivals: 247Sports: ESPN:				
David Frohling; G	Santa Barbara, CA	San Marcos High School	6 ft 2 in (1.88 m)	N/A	
David Frohling; G	Recruit ratings: Rivals: 247Sports: ESPN:				
Overall recruit ranking:
Note: In many cases, Scout, Rivals, 247Sports, On3, and ESPN may conflict in their listings of height and weight.; In these cases, the average was taken. ESPN grades are on a 100-point scale.; Sources: "2018 Team Ranking". Rivals.

== Preseason ==
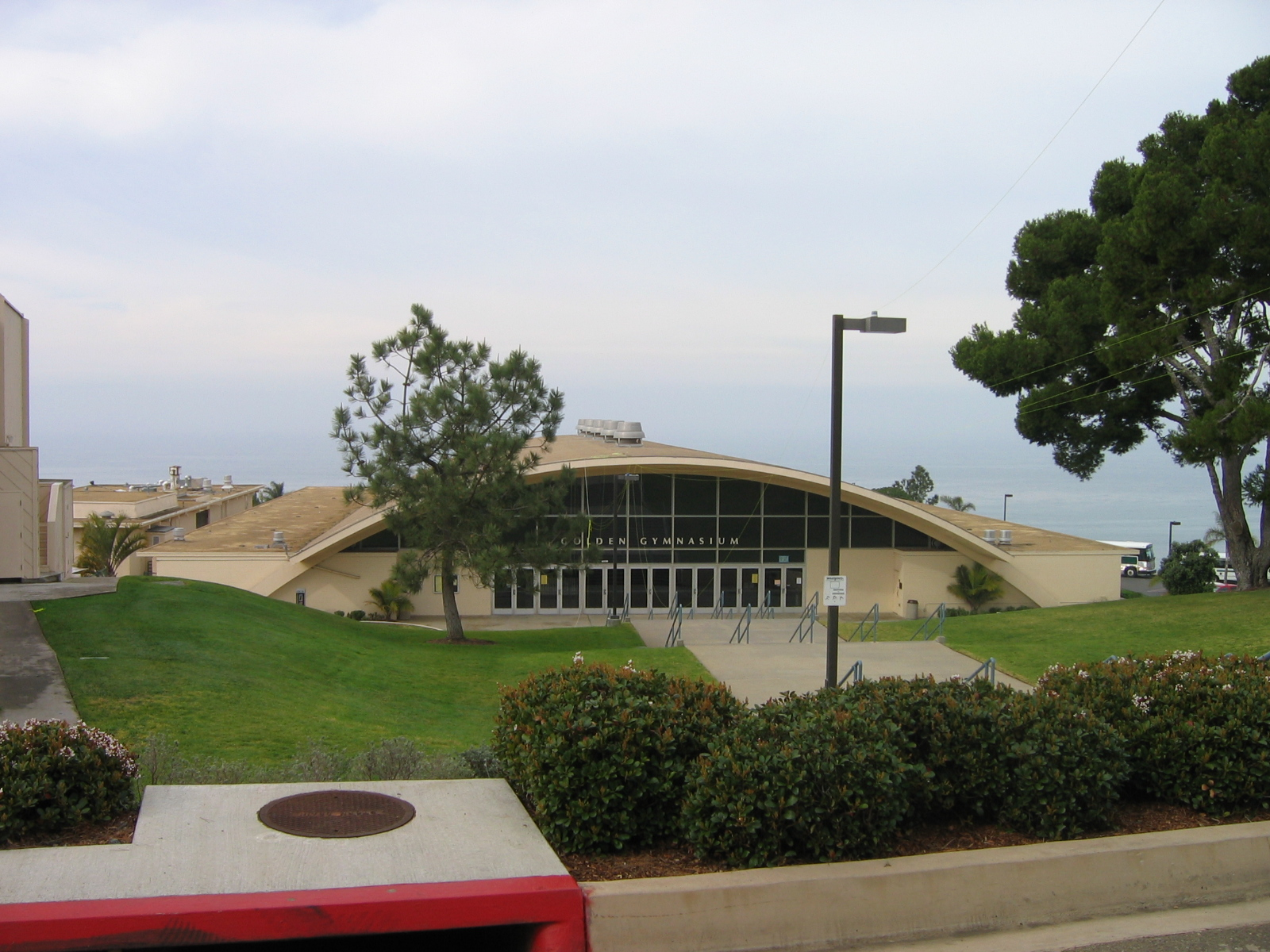
The Sea Lions played their home games at Golden Gymnasium

=== Pacific West coaches poll ===
The Pacific West Conference coaches poll was released on October 31, 2018. Point Loma Nazarene was picked to finish first in the Pacific West Conference with 142 points and 10 first-place votes.

Coaches poll
Predicted finish	Team	Votes (1st place)
1	Point Loma Nazarene	142 (10)
2	Azusa Pacific	122 (2)
3	Concordia	118
4	Chaminade	104
5	Hawai'i Pacific	99
6	Academy of Art	78
7	Biola	70
8	Dominican	53
9	Hawai'i Hilo	51
10	Holy Names	47
11	Fresno Pacific	36
12	Notre Dame de Namur	16

=== Preseason All-Pacific West teams ===
Daulton Hommes, Preston Beverly, and Josh Rodriguez were selected to the All-Pacific West Preseason Team.

== Roster ==
2018–19 Point Loma Nazarene Sea Lions men's basketball team
Players
Coaches

Pos.	#	Name	Height	Weight	Year	Previous school	Hometown
C	0	Cameron Gilbert	6 ft 10 in (2.08 m)	245 lb (111 kg)	Sr	Pinnacle HS	Prescott, Arizona
F	1	Preston Beverly	6 ft 7 in (2.01 m)	220 lb (100 kg)	Sr	Montana State Billings	Lake Elsinore, California
F	2	Kaden Anderson	6 ft 7 in (2.01 m)	210 lb (95 kg)	Fr	Enumclaw HS	Enumclaw, Washington
G	3	Josh Rodriguez	5 ft 10 in (1.78 m)	180 lb (82 kg)	Sr	Sonora HS	La Habra, California
G	4	Jack Hutchison	6 ft 0 in (1.83 m)	180 lb (82 kg)	RS Fr	Iowa State	Plymouth, Minnesota
G	11	Tanner Nelson	6 ft 3 in (1.91 m)	205 lb (93 kg)	Sr	BYU–Hawaii	Vancouver, Washington
G	12	Brock Mackenzie	6 ft 2 in (1.88 m)	175 lb (79 kg)	Fr	Eastside Catholic School	Sammamish, Washington
F	13	Sterling Somers	6 ft 5 in (1.96 m)	205 lb (93 kg)	Jr	Lynden HS	Lynden, Washington
G	14	Zac Bulgin	6 ft 1 in (1.85 m)	175 lb (79 kg)	Fr	West Salem HS	Salem, Oregon
C	15	Frank Kalinski	6 ft 6 in (1.98 m)	210 lb (95 kg)	Fr	York School	Monterey, California
F	21	Ben Okhotin	6 ft 6 in (1.98 m)	210 lb (95 kg)	RS So	Westmont	San Diego, California
G	22	David Frohling	6 ft 2 in (1.88 m)	180 lb (82 kg)	Fr	San Marcos HS	Santa Barbara, California
C	23	Ziggy Satterthwaite	6 ft 6 in (1.98 m)	230 lb (104 kg)	Sr	North Idaho	Puyallup, Washington
F	32	Noah Stapes	6 ft 5 in (1.96 m)	205 lb (93 kg)	RS So	Saint Francis HS	San Jose, California
G	33	Sam Sharghi	6 ft 1 in (1.85 m)	190 lb (86 kg)	So	Roberts Wesleyan	San Diego, California
G	34	Daulton Hommes	6 ft 8 in (2.03 m)	215 lb (98 kg)	Jr	Western Washington	Lynden, Washington

Head coach

- Ryan Looney (Eastern Oregon)

Assistant coach(es)

- Jordan Courneya (UC Riverside)
- Davis Furman (Butler)

Legend

- (C) Team captain
- (S) Suspended
- (I) Ineligible
- (W) Walk-on
- Injured
- Current redshirt

Roster

== Schedule and results ==
Date time, TV	Rank^{#}	Opponent^{#}	Result	Record	High points	High rebounds	High assists	Site (attendance) city, state
Non-conference regular season
November 9, 2018*; 3:00 p.m.		Montana State Billings; Sea Lion Tip-Off Classic	W 100–75	1–0	33 – Hommes	7 – Satterthwaite	11 – Rodriguez	Golden Gymnasium (301); San Diego, CA
November 10, 2018*; 7:30 p.m.		Saint Martin's; Sea Lion Tip-Off Classic	L 76–81	1–1	37 – Hommes	8 – Hommes	6 – Rodriguez	Golden Gymnasium (302); San Diego, CA
November 14, 2018*; 7:00 p.m.		No. 15 UC San Diego	W 75–73	2–1	15 – Tied	12 – Beverly	3 – Rodriguez	Golden Gymnasium (722); San Diego, CA
November 17, 2018*; 8:00 p.m.		San Diego Christian	W 85–49	3–1	24 – Satterthwaite	13 – Satterthwaite	5 – Rodriguez	Golden Gymnasium (1,661); San Diego, CA
November 23, 2018*; 7:30 p.m.		Cal State San Bernardino; Thanksgiving Classic	W 83–68	4–1	30 – Hommes	15 – Beverly	2 – Tied	Golden Gymnasium (263); San Diego, CA
November 24, 2018*; 7:30 p.m.		No. 16 St. Cloud State; Thanksgiving Classic	L 65–74	4–2	21 – Hommes	8 – Hommes	4 – Tied	Golden Gymnasium (172); San Diego, CA
Pacific West regular season
November 29, 2018; 7:30 p.m.		at Academy of Art	W 54–51	5–2 (1–0)	16 – Hommes	8 – Satterthwaite	1 – Tied	Kezar Pavilion (40); San Francisco, CA
December 1, 2018; 7:30 p.m.		at Dominican	W 90–65	6–2 (2–0)	15 – Anderson	6 – Beverly	3 – Rodriguez	Conlan Center (133); San Rafael, CA
December 5, 2018; 7:30 p.m.		at Biola	W 82–54	7–2 (3–0)	18 – Hommes	8 – Beverly	7 – Rodriguez	Golden Gymnasium (278); San Diego, CA
December 8, 2018; 4:00 p.m.		Azusa Pacific	W 69–54	8–2 (4–0)	19 – Hommes	10 – Somers	3 – Rodriguez	Golden Gymnasium (417); San Diego, CA
December 17, 2018; 4:30 p.m.		at Fresno Pacific	W 78–56	9–2 (5–0)	21 – Rodriguez	11 – Hommes	6 – Rodriguez	Special Events Center (213); Fresno, CA
December 29, 2018; 4:00 p.m.	No. 24	Holy Names	W 80–74	10–2 (6–0)	21 – Hommes	8 – Somers	5 – Rodriguez	Golden Gymnasium (267); San Diego, CA
December 31, 2018; 4:00 p.m.	No. 24	Notre Dame de Namur	W 75–56	11–2 (7–0)	16 – Hommes	11 – Satterthwaite	5 – tied	Golden Gymnasium (177); San Diego, CA
January 2, 2019; 7:30 p.m.	No. 24	at Biola	W 68–65	12–2 (8–0)	19 – Hommes	8 – Satterthwaite	3 – Satterthwaite	Chase Gymnasium (440); La Mirada, CA
January 7, 2019; 7:30 p.m.	No. 24	at Azusa Pacific	W 86–77	13–2 (9–0)	16 – Beverly	10 – Satterthwaite	7 – Rodriguez	Felix Event Center (729); Azusa, CA
January 15, 2019; 8:30 p.m.	No. 11	at Hawaii Pacific	W 68–60	14–2 (10–0)	17 – Hommes	7 – tied	7 – Rodriguez	Neal S. Blaisdell Center (236); Honolulu, HI
January 17, 2019; 7:30 p.m.	No. 11	at No. 19 Chaminade	W 75–71	15–2 (11–0)	28 – Hommes	9 – Beverly	5 – Beverly	McCabe Gymnasium (213); Honolulu, HI
January 19, 2019; 9:30 p.m.	No. 11	at Hawaii–Hilo	W 95–85	16–2 (12–0)	24 – Satterthwaite	9 – Beverly	11 – Rodriguez	Afook-Chinen Civic Auditorium (503); Honolulu, HI
January 24, 2019; 7:30 p.m.	No. 10	Dominican	W 94–57	17–2 (13–0)	36 – Hommes	13 – Beverly	4 – Somers	Golden Gymnasium (451); San Diego, CA
January 26, 2019; 4:15 p.m.	No. 10	Academy of Art	W 85–66	18–2 (14–0)	33 – Hommes	12 – Beverly	5 – Rodriguez	Golden Gymnasium (301); San Diego, CA
February 2, 2019; 7:30 p.m.	No. 10	at Concordia	L 85–91	18–3 (14–1)	28 – Hommes	11 – Hommes	7 – Rodriguez	CU Arena (678); Irvine, CA
February 7, 2019; 7:30 p.m.	No. 9	at Notre Dame de Namur	W 73–39	19–3 (15–1)	18 – Anderson	12 – Beverly	5 – Beverly	Walter Gleason Gym (110); Belmont, CA
February 9, 2019; 6:00 p.m.	No. 9	at Holy Names	W 82–57	20–3 (16–1)	35 – Hommes	8 – Beverly	5 – Mackenzie	Tobin Gymnasium (114); Oakland, CA
February 14, 2019; 7:30 p.m.	No. 8	Hawaii–Hilo	L 77–81	20–4 (16–2)	20 – Beverly	7 – tied	6 – Rodriguez	Golden Gymnasium (336); San Diego, CA
February 16, 2019; 4:00 p.m.	No. 8	No. 22 Chaminade	W 97–92	21–4 (17–2)	27 – Hommes	6 – tied	4 – Rodriguez	Golden Gymnasium (422); San Diego, CA
February 21, 2019; 7:45 p.m.	No. 16	Hawaii Pacific	W 106–47	22–4 (18–2)	28 – Hommes	10 – Somers	4 – tied	Golden Gymnasium (604); San Diego, CA
February 23, 2019; 7:30 p.m.	No. 16	Fresno Pacific	W 91–71	23–4 (19–2)	23 – Beverly	8 – Hommes	5 – Rodriguez	Golden Gymnasium (352); San Diego, CA
March 2, 2019; 4:00 p.m.	No. 12	Concordia	W 93–83	24–4 (20–2)	25 – Beverly	8 – Hommes	5 – Rodriguez	Golden Gymnasium (848); San Diego, CA
Pacific West tournament
March 8, 2019; 3:00 p.m.	(1)	vs. (4) Azusa Pacific; Semifinals	W 77–65	25–4	19 – Beverly	11 – Beverly	4 – Rodriguez	Conlan Center (161); San Rafael, CA
March 9, 2019; 2:00 p.m.	(1)	vs. (2) Concordia; Championship	W 67–58	26–4	19 – Hommes	13 – Satterthwaite	2 – Hommes	Conlan Center (251); San Rafael, CA
NCAA DII tournament
March 15, 2019; 7:30 p.m.	(1)	vs. (8) Western Oregon; West Regional First Round	W 70–58	27–4	21 – Hommes	7 – tied	3 – Rodriguez	Golden Gymnasium (1,274); San Diego, CA
March 16, 2019; 7:30 p.m.	(1)	vs. (4) UC San Diego; West Regional Second Round	W 73–50	28–4	27 – Hommes	11 – Hommes	2 – Rodriguez	Golden Gymnasium (1,303); San Diego, CA
March 18, 2019; 7:30 p.m.	(1)	vs. (3) Saint Martin's; West Regional Championship	W 60–54	29–4	25 – Hommes	9 – Beverly	4 – Rodriguez	Golden Gymnasium (1,828); San Diego, CA
March 27, 2019; 6:30 p.m.	(6)	vs. (3) Queens; Elite Eight	W 87–74	30–4	22 – tied	8 – Satterthwaite	3 – tied	Ford Center (7,330); Evansville, IN
March 28, 2019; 6:30 p.m.	(6)	vs. (7) Southern Indiana; Final Four	W 81–71	31–4	20 – Hommes	8 – tied	7 – Rodriguez	Ford Center (5,965); Evansville, IN
March 30, 2019; 12:00 p.m.	(6)	vs. (1) Northwest Missouri State; National Championship	L 58–64	31–5	26 – Hommes	9 – Beverly	3 – Rodriguez	Ford Center (4,269); Evansville, IN
*Non-conference game. ^{#}Rankings from AP Poll. (#) Tournament seedings in parentheses. All times are in Pacific.

== Awards and honors ==
All-Americans

- Daulton Hommes – 1st Team (NABC)
- Daulton Hommes – 2nd Team (D2CCA)

NABC Division II Player of the Year

- Daulton Hommes

NABC All-District West Team

- Daulton Hommes – 1st Team

D2CCA West Region Player of the Year

- Daulton Hommes

D2CCA All-West Region Team

- Daulton Hommes – 1st Team

PacWest Player of the Year

- Daulton Hommes

PacWest Newcomer of the Year

- Daulton Hommes

PacWest Coach of the Year

- Ryan Looney

All-PacWest Team

- Daulton Hommes – 1st Team
- Preston Beverly – 2nd Team
- Josh Rodriguez – 2nd Team
- Ziggy Satterthwaite – 3rd Team

NCAA All-Tournament Team

- Daulton Hommes

NCAA West Regional Most Outstanding Player

- Daulton Hommes

PacWest Tournament Most Outstanding Player

- Preston Beverly

PacWest All-Tournament Team

- Preston Beverly
- Josh Rodriguez

All-PacWest Academic Team

- Kaden Andersen
- Preston Beverly
- Cameron Gilbert
- Daulton Hommes
- Frank Kalinski
- Brock Mackenzie
- Tanner Nelson
- Ben Okhotin
- Sterling Somers
- Noah Stapes
