= Jacob Speelman =

American sports coach and administrator (1893–1972)

Biographical details
- Born: February 9, 1893; Michigan, U.S.
- Died: August 9, 1972 (aged 79); Crystal, Michigan, U.S.
- Education: Oberlin

Playing career

Football
- 1913–1915: Missouri

Coaching career (HC unless noted)

Football
- 1917–1918: Oberlin
- 1920–1925: Aberdeen Normal

Basketball
- 1916–1917: Lawrence
- 1920–1926: Aberdeen Normal

Administrative career (AD unless noted)
- 1942–1943: Ferris State

Head coaching record
- Overall: 59–38 (basketball)

Jacob Speelman (February 9, 1893 – August 9, 1972) was an American football and basketball coach and college athletics administrator. He played college football at the University of Missouri, serving as team captain in 1915.

Speelman began his coaching career as the head basketball coach at Lawrence University in Appleton, Wisconsin from 1916 to 1917. He served as the head football coach at Oberlin College in Oberlin, Ohio from 1917 to 1918 and Northern State University–then known as Aberdeen Normal College–in Aberdeen, South Dakota from 1923 to 1925. He also served as Aberdeen Normal's head basketball coach from 1920 to 1926.
