= Joe Swetland =

American college football player and coach (1886–1952)

Biographical details
- Born: November 2, 1886; Reedsburg, Wisconsin, U.S.
- Died: January 7, 1952 (aged 65); Kalamazoo, Michigan, U.S.

Playing career

Football
- 1906–1909: Ripon

Coaching career (HC unless noted)

Football
- 1910–1911: Eau Claire HS (WI)
- 1912–1915: ND State Normal & Industrial
- 1916–1919: Dunwoody Institute
- 1920–1925: Stevens Point Normal
- 1926: Northern Normal
- 1927: Hutchinson HS (MN)

Basketball
- 1920–1926: Stevens Point Normal
- 1926–1927: Northern Normal

Head coaching record
- Overall: 40–48 (college basketball)

Joseph Ellsworth Swetland (November 2, 1886 – January 7, 1952) was an American college football player and coach. He served as the head coach at the Stevens Point Normal School—now known as University of Wisconsin–Stevens Point—from 1920 to 1925 and at Northern Normal and Industrial School—now known as Northern State University—in Aberdeen, South Dakota for one season, in 1926. Swetland was also the head basketball coach at Stevens Point Normal from 1920 to 1927 and Northern Normal and Industrial for the 1926–27 season. He died on January 7, 1952, at his home in Kalamazoo, Michigan.

== Head coaching record ==
=== College football ===
Year	Team	Overall	Conference	Standing	Bowl/playoffs
Stevens Point Pointers (Inter-Normal Athletic Conference of Wisconsin) (1920–1925)
1920	Stevens Point	3–2–1	1–1–1	6th	
1921	Stevens Point	3–2–1	1–1–1	6th	
1922	Stevens Point	3–4–1	1–3–1	8th	
1923	Stevens Point	0–6–1	0–4–1	10th	
1924	Stevens Point	2–5	1–5	10th	
1925	Stevens Point	2–3	1–3	T–8th	
Stevens Point:		13–22–4	5–17–4		
Northern Normal Wolves (South Dakota Intercollegiate Conference) (1926)
1926	Northern Normal	5–1	3–1	5th	
Northern Normal:		5–1	3–1		
Total:					
