= Zach Hankins =

American basketball player (born 1996)

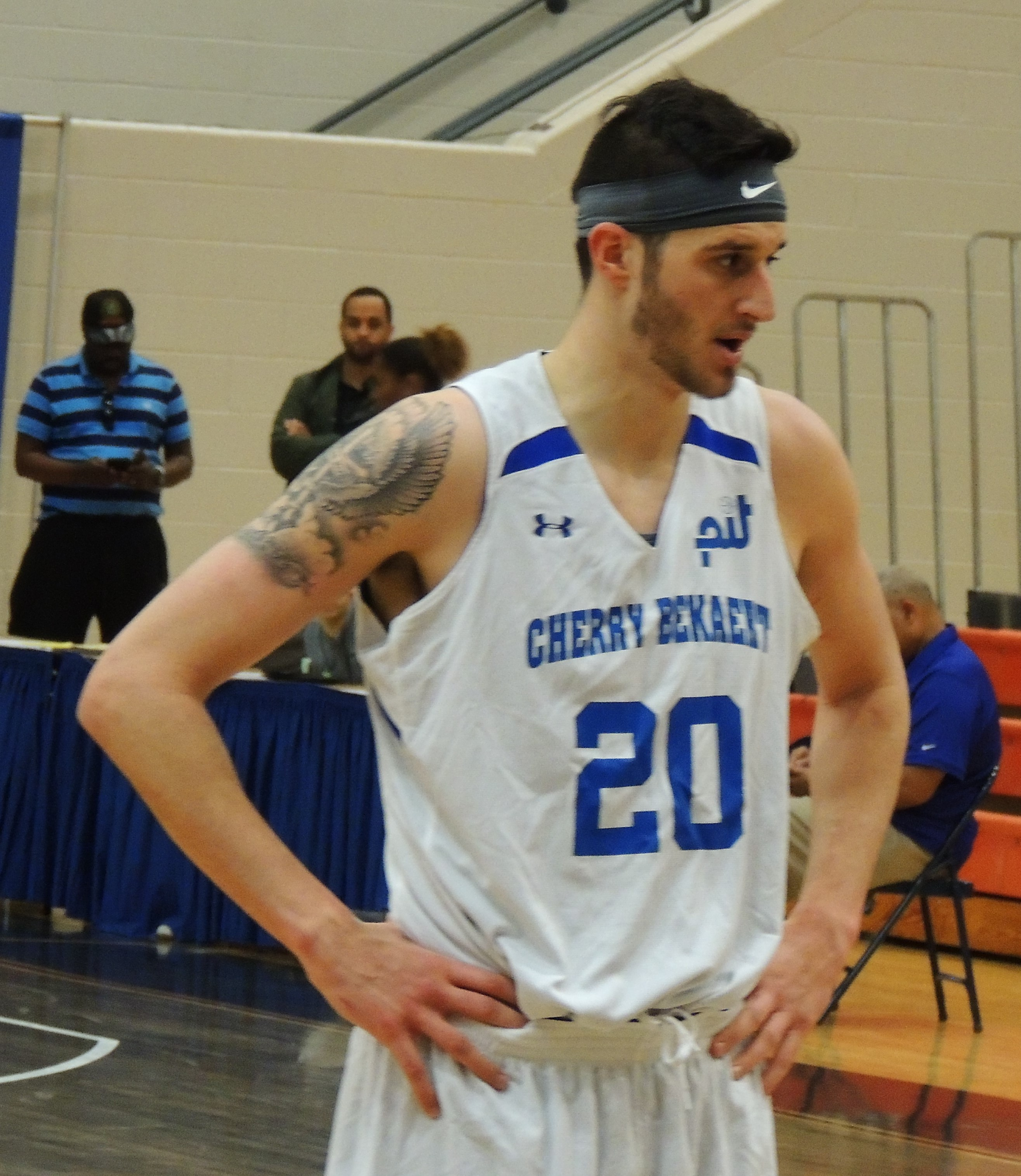
- Hankins at the Portsmouth Invitational in 2019

No. 35 – Pizza Bulls Bordo Bandırma
- Position: Center
- League: Basketbol Süper Ligi

Personal information
- Born: July 27, 1996 (age 30) Charlevoix, Michigan, U.S.
- Listed height: 6 ft 11 in (2.11 m)
- Listed weight: 245 lb (111 kg)

Career information
- High school: Charlevoix (Charlevoix, Michigan)
- College: Ferris State (2015–2018); Xavier (2018–2019)
- NBA draft: 2019: undrafted
- Playing career: 2019–present

Career history
- 2019–2020: ČEZ Nymburk
- 2020: Maccabi Rishon LeZion
- 2021–2022: Birmingham Squadron
- 2022: Mets de Guaynabo
- 2022–2024: Hapoel Jerusalem
- 2024–2025: U-BT Cluj-Napoca
- 2025: Coviran Granada
- 2025–2026: Maccabi Tel Aviv
- 2026–present: Bandırma Bordo

Career highlights
- All-Champions League First Team (2023); Israeli Premier League champion (2026); Israeli Premier League MVP (2023); All-Israeli Premier League First Team (2023); Israeli State Cup winner (2023); NCAA Division II champion (2018); NCAA Division II Tournament MVP (2018); NABC Division II Player of the Year (2018); 2× GLIAC Player of the Year (2017, 2018)

Zach Hankins (born July 27, 1996) is an American professional basketball player for Bandırma Bordo of the Turkish Basketbol Süper Ligi (BSL). He played college basketball for the Xavier Musketeers his senior season. As a power forward/center, Hankins was named the NCAA Division II National Player of the Year for the 2017–18 season while playing for Ferris State.

== Early life ==
Hankins was born on July 27, 1996, to Scott and Dawn Hankins. He participated in the 3-on-3 summer slam/beach bash basketball tournament in the Venetian Games growing up. In addition to basketball, he had a passion for music and played the trombone in a band.

Hankins played at Charlevoix High School in Charlevoix, Michigan. As a junior, he averaged 12 points and eight rebounds per game, while shooting 71 percent. In late 2013, Hankins was running up the floor and stopped abruptly, breaking his left foot. Three months later, a doctor gave him clearance to resume practicing, but Hankins broke the foot further. As a result, he missed all but the final two games of his senior year due to the injury. Hankins received some interest from several NCAA Division III schools as well as Grand Valley State and Lake Superior State. Ferris State was the only school to offer him a scholarship, so he committed to play college basketball for the Bulldogs. Then-assistant coach Andy Bronkema spotted Hankins at a camp at Ferris State and made him the $3,000 scholarship pledge.

== College career ==
Hankins redshirted the 2014–15 season, joining the NCAA Division II Bulldogs the next year. As a freshman, he appeared in 34 games off the bench and averaged 4.8 points and 3.8 rebounds per game. He became a star as a redshirt sophomore, averaging 14.6 points and 10.5 rebounds per game. He had 130 blocks on the season, which led Division II and set the school single-season school record. Hankins was one of the finalists for the Bevo Francis Award for the top small college player and was the only sophomore to be named to the 2017 Division II Conference Commissioner's Association All-America Second Team. He led Ferris State to a Great Lakes Intercollegiate Athletic Conference (GLIAC) regular-season and tournament title as well as a then-school record for wins with a 28–5 record. Ferris State reached the second round of the 2017 NCAA Division II Tournament before falling to GLIAC rival Findlay 68–63.

In his junior season, Hankins became one of the top players in Division II. He averaged 15.1 points, 9.7 rebounds, and 3.3 blocks per game and had a field goal percentage of 63 percent. His 128 blocks led the nation in that statistical category. Hankins repeated as GLIAC Player of the Year and was again a finalist for the Bevo Francis Award. He was named the National Player of the Year by the National Association of Basketball Coaches. On the season, Ferris State compiled a 38–1 record and claimed the school's first national championship in the 2018 NCAA Division II Tournament, defeating Northern State in the final by a score of 71–69. Hankins scored 19 points, including 14 in the first half, in the championship and was named the tournament's most valuable player. "Zach's the best-ever, period" at Ferris State, said coach Bronkema. After the season, Hankins graduated with a degree in environmental biology.

On April 5, 2018, Hankins announced he was transferring to Xavier for his final collegiate season, choosing the Musketeers. Hankins briefly opened up his search after former Xavier coach Chris Mack left to take the job at Louisville, but remained with new coach Travis Steele after Steele said Hankins was still a priority. "In a way, I'm moving up, but in a way I still like I've been on this level already," he said. Hankins scored a season-high 23 points and had 10 rebounds in a win against Georgetown in January 2019. In his only year at Xavier, Hankins averaged 10.6 points, 5.2 rebounds and 1.5 blocks per game. He led the Musketeers to a 19–16 record and had 13 points, nine rebounds and two assists in a 78–76 overtime loss to Texas in the second round of the 2019 National Invitation Tournament.

== Professional career ==
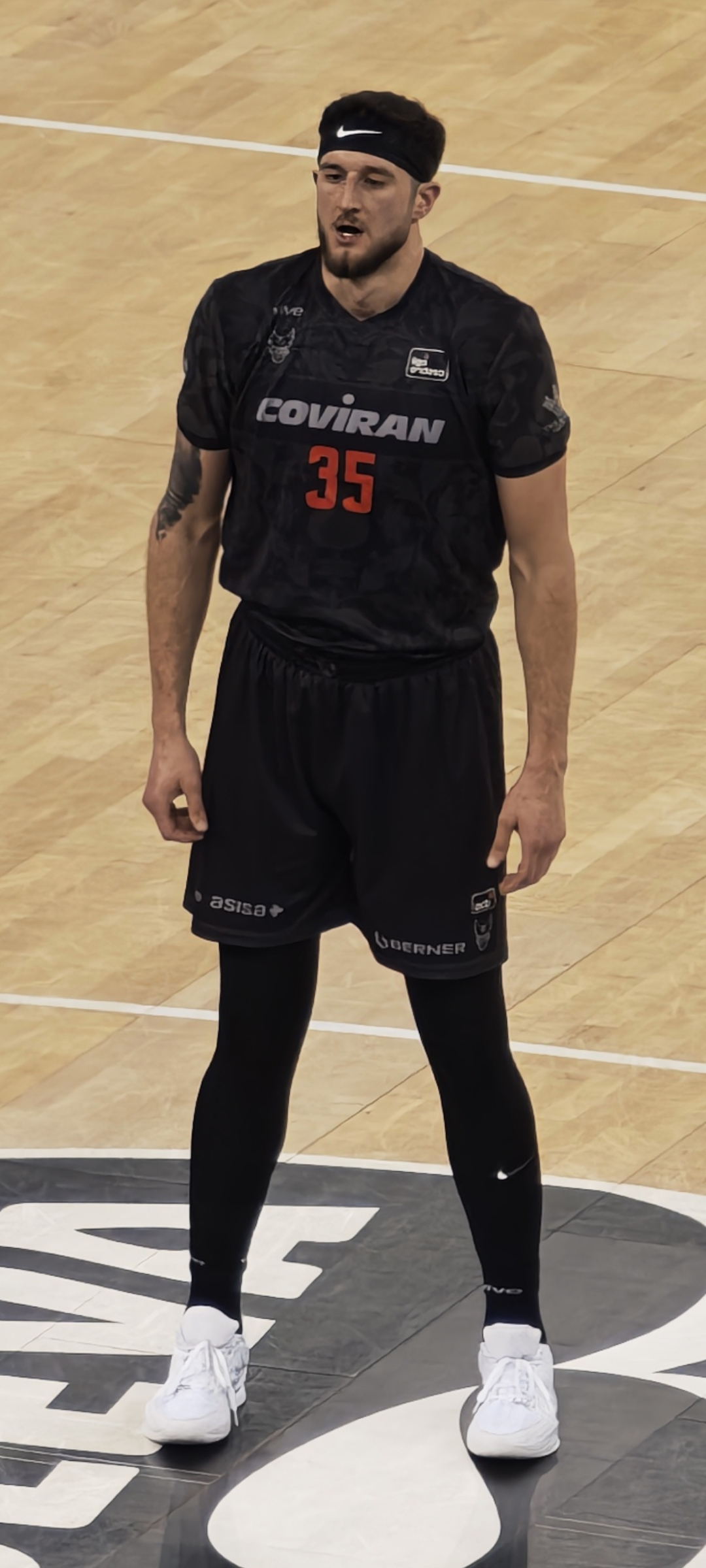
Hankins with Granada in 2025

Hankins played for the Philadelphia 76ers in the NBA Summer League after going undrafted in the 2019 NBA draft. Hankins began his professional career in the Czech Republic with ČEZ Nymburk. He was named to the Basketball Champions League Team of the Week on January 16, 2020, after contributing a season-high 18 points, seven rebounds, a block and a steal in a win over Iberostar Tenerife. Hankins averaged 12.8 points, 6.4 rebounds and 1.6 blocks per game.

On May 19, 2020, he signed with Maccabi Rishon LeZion of the Israeli Basketball Premier League. He averaged 12.4 points and 6.6 rebounds per game, and shot .641 from the floor.

On August 1, 2020, Hankins signed with Galatasaray of the Turkish Basketball Super League (BSL) and the Basketball Champions League. However, on August 21, Hankins announced he was not joining the team.

On July 27, 2021, Hankins signed with the South East Melbourne Phoenix of the National Basketball League. After sustaining a knee injury during the 2021 NBA Summer League, he was released by the Phoenix on September 1. On November 15, Hankins was acquired by the Birmingham Squadron of the NBA G League.

On April 10, 2022, Hankins signed with the Mets de Guaynabo of the BSN. He averaged 13.5 points, 6.2 rebounds, and 1.6 blocks (4th in the league) per game.

On July 28, 2022, Hankins signed with Hapoel Jerusalem of the Israeli Premier League and the Basketball Champions League. On February 7, 2023, Hankins scored 28 points in a crucial game against SIG Strasbourg in the champions league, his career high in the competition. On February 16, Hankins won the Israeli state cup with Hapoel Jerusalem after a 67–61 win against a Euroleague side opponent and their old nemesis, Maccabi Tel Aviv. He was released by the team on July 7, 2024.

On July 19, 2024, he signed with U-BT Cluj-Napoca of the Liga Națională de Baschet Masculin.

On July 31, 2025, he signed with Coviran Granada of the Liga ACB. In December, he left Granada to join Maccabi Tel Aviv of the Ligat HaAl and EuroLeague until the end of the season. Hankins averaged 7.2 points, 4.0 rebounds, and 1.2 assists per game. On July 14, 2026, he signed with Pizza Bulls Bordo Bandırma of the Basketbol Süper Ligi (BSL).
