= Matt Wilber =

American college basketball coach

Current position
- Title: Head coach
- Team: Northern State
- Conference: NSIC
- Record: 13–17 (.433)

Playing career
- 1997–2002: Augustana

Coaching career (HC unless noted)
- 2002–2003: Augustana (SA)
- 2003–2004: Sioux Falls (assistant)
- 2004–2006: South Dakota State (assistant)
- 2013–2024: Dakota Wesleyan
- 2024: Phoenix Mercury (assistant)
- 2025–present: Northern State

Head coaching record
- Overall: 237–142 (.625)
- Tournaments: 7–5 (NAIA)

Accomplishments and honors

Championships
- GPAC regular season (2015)

Awards
- Rawlings NAIA Coach of the Year (2015); GPAC Coach of the Year (2015); South Dakota Sports Writers College Men's Coach of the Year (2015)

Matt Wilber is an American college basketball coach, currently the head coach of the Northern State Wolves.

== Early life ==
Wilber, a native of Miller, South Dakota, played collegiate baseball and basketball at Augustana University in Sioux Falls, South Dakota. Wilber was a four-year starter for the Vikings baseball team and was also a starter for their basketball team.

== Coaching career ==
=== Early coaching career ===
Following his player career at Augustana, Wilber spent one season as a student assistant for the Vikings basketball team under head coach Perry Ford. He then spent the 2003–2004 season with the Sioux Falls Cougars as an assistant under head coach Nate Tibbetts. That team would finish 26–12, winning the GPAC tournament championship and would eventually be inducted into the University of Sioux Falls Athletics Hall of Fame. Then from 2004 to 2006, Wilber was an assistant for the South Dakota State Jackrabbits in Brookings, South Dakota under head coach Scott Nagy.

From 2006 until 2013, Wilber owned an directed TIBBS Basketball, a year-round basketball development program, alongside Nate Tibbetts.

=== Dakota Wesleyan ===
In June 2013, Wilber was named as the head coach of the Dakota Wesleyan Tigers in Mitchell, South Dakota. In his time with the Tigers, he accumulated an overall record of 224–125, won one GPAC regular season championship, had six straight appearances in the NAIA tournament, had 13 NAIA All-Americans, and was named as the Rawlings NAIA Coach of the Year, the GPAC Coach of the Year, and the South Dakota Sports Writers College Men's Coach of the Year in 2015.

=== Phoenix Mercury ===
Wilber spent the 2024 WNBA season as an assistant coach for the Phoenix Mercury. While there, he was the personal player coach for Diana Taurasi and Rebecca Allen.

=== Northern State ===
In March 2025, it was announced that Wilber would be the next head coach of the Northern State Wolves in Aberdeen, South Dakota.

== Head coaching record ==
Record table
| Season | Team | Overall | Conference | Standing | Postseason |
|---|---|---|---|---|---|
Dakota Wesleyan (Great Plains Athletic Conference) (2013–2024)
| 2013–14 | Dakota Wesleyan | 18–14 | 10–10 | 6th | |
| 2014–15 | Dakota Wesleyan | 32–5 | 17–3 | T-1st | NAIA Division II Runner-Up |
| 2015–16 | Dakota Wesleyan | 23–11 | 13–7 | 2nd | NAIA Division II Second Round |
| 2016–17 | Dakota Wesleyan | 23–10 | 13–5 | T-2nd | NAIA Division II First Round |
| 2017–18 | Dakota Wesleyan | 23–11 | 11–7 | 4th | NAIA Division II Second Round |
| 2018–19 | Dakota Wesleyan | 23–10 | 13–7 | 4th | NAIA Division II Second Round |
| 2019–20 | Dakota Wesleyan | 23–9 | 13–7 | 2nd | NAIA Tournament cancelled due to COVID-19 |
| 2020–21 | Dakota Wesleyan | 19–8 | 14–6 | T-3rd | |
| 2021–22 | Dakota Wesleyan | 13–16 | 9–11 | 8th | |
| 2022–23 | Dakota Wesleyan | 13–16 | 9–11 | 6th | |
| 2023–24 | Dakota Wesleyan | 14–15 | 9–11 | T-7th | |
| Dakota Wesleyan: | | 224–125 (.642) | 131–85 (.606) | | |
Northern State (Northern Sun Intercollegiate Conference) (2025–present)
| 2025–26 | Northern State | 12–17 | 12–10 | T–7th / T–2nd (North) | |
| 2026–27 | Northern State | 1–0 | 0–0 | | |
| Northern State: | | 13–17 (.433) | 13–10 (.565) | | |
| Total: | | 237–142 (.625) | | | |
National champion Postseason invitational champion Conference regular season champion Conference regular season and conference tournament champion Division regular season champion Division regular season and conference tournament champion Conference tournament champion
