= Ty Danielson =

American college basketball coach

Current position
- Title: Head coach
- Team: Northwestern Oklahoma State
- Conference: Great American Conference
- Record: 2–1 (.667)

Playing career
- 2014–2018: Nebraska–Kearney

Coaching career (HC unless noted)
- 2018–2020: Missouri Western (GA)
- 2020–2021: Missouri Western (assistant)
- 2021–2024: Fort Lewis (assistant)
- 2024–2025: Washburn (assistant)
- 2025–2026: North Dakota (assistant)
- 2026–present: Northwestern Oklahoma State

Head coaching record
- Overall: 2–1 (.667)

Tyler Danielson is an American college basketball coach, currently the head coach of the Northwestern Oklahoma State Rangers.

== Early life ==
Danielson is originally from York, Nebraska, where he attended York High School. He then attended and played college basketball at the University of Nebraska at Kearney in Kearney, Nebraska. He appeared in 119 games for the Lopers and ranks 23rd in school history for total points scored with 1,301. While there, he was also named to the All–MIAA Honorable Mention team twice in 2017 and 2018. He graduated from the University of Nebraska at Kearney in 2018 with a bachelor's degree in general studies.

== Coaching career ==
Danielson started his coaching career as a graduate assistant for the Missouri Western Griffons in 2018 under head coach Sundance Wicks. He graduated from Missouri Western State University in 2020 with a master's degree in sports and fitness management. In 2020, Sundance Wicks was hired as an assistant for the Wyoming Cowboys and assistant Will Martin was promoted to head coach. Subsequently, Danielson was hired as a full-time assistant during the 2020–21 season.

In June 2021, Danielson was hired as an assistant coach at Fort Lewis College in Durango, Colorado. He spent three seasons with the Skyhawks, helping lead them to an overall record of 78–17 and win back-to-back RMAC tournament championships in 2023 and 2024.

Danielson was hired as an assistant coach for the Washburn Ichabods in June 2024. During the 2024–25 season, he helped lead the Ichabods to a 30–4 record and appearance in the Final Four round of the 2025 NCAA Division II men's basketball tournament.

In 2025, Danielson was hired as an assistant coach for the North Dakota Fighting Hawks under head coach Paul Sather. During the 2025–26 season, he helped lead the Fighting Hawks to a 18–17 record and an appearance in the championship game of the 2026 Summit League men's basketball tournament.

In April 2026, Danielson was hired as the next head coach of the Northwestern Oklahoma State Rangers.

== Head coaching record ==
Record table
Season	Team	Overall	Conference	Standing	Postseason
Northwestern Oklahoma State (Great American Conference) (2026–present)
2026–27	Northwestern Oklahoma State	2–1	0–0		
Northwestern Oklahoma State:		2–1 (.667)	0–0 (–)		
Total:		2–1 (.667)			
National champion Postseason invitational champion Conference regular season champion Conference regular season and conference tournament champion Division regular season champion Division regular season and conference tournament champion Conference tournament champion

== Personal life ==
His brother, Brady, was a basketball player for the North Dakota Fighting Hawks and currently holds the program record for career games played with 151.
