= Bob Wachs =

American football and basketball coach (1923–1993)

Biographical details
- Born: January 26, 1923; Tracy, Minnesota, U.S.
- Died: November 28, 1993 (aged 70)

Playing career

Football
- 1946: Colorado State–Greeley

Coaching career (HC unless noted)

Football
- 1956: Northern State

Basketball
- 1955–1985: Northern State

Head coaching record
- Overall: 6–3 (football); 532–286 (basketball)

Accomplishments and honors

Awards
- Basketball; 2× NSIC Men's Coach of the Year (1984–1985)

Robert R. Wachs (January 26, 1923 – November 28, 1993) was an American football and basketball coach. He served as the head men's basketball coach at Northern State University in Aberdeen, South Dakota from 1955 to 1985, compiling a record of 532–286. Wachs was also the head football coach at Northern State in 1956, tallying a mark of 6–3. He served in the Marines as an officer just after WWII in Japan.

== Head coaching record ==
=== Football ===
Year	Team	Overall	Conference	Standing	Bowl/playoffs
Northern State Wolves (South Dakota Intercollegiate Conference) (1956)
1956	Northern State	6–3	4–2	3rd	
Northern State:		6–3	4–2		
Total:		6–3			
