= Wachs Arena =

Multi-purpose sports arena in South Dakota

Coordinates: 45°26′59.20″N 98°28′49.36″W

Barnett Center
- Interactive map of Barnett Center
- Location: Aberdeen, South Dakota
- Owner: Northern State University
- Operator: Northern State University
- Capacity: 8,057 (arena)
- Surface: Multi-surface

Construction
- Groundbreaking: 1986
- Opened: 1987
- Renovated: 2011

Tenants
- Northern State Wolves: (men's & women's basketball, volleyball, and Wrestling); South Dakota State "B" boys basketball (1989–present)

The Wachs Arena is an 8,057 seat multi-purpose arena in Aberdeen, South Dakota, United States. The Wachs Arena is home to the Don Meyer Court, named after long-time winning coach Don Meyer. The Arena is located in the Barnett Center; which holds swimming pool, wrestling room, weight room, training room, auxiliary gym, eight locker rooms, classrooms and offices, plus a 160-meter indoor track and a wooden basketball court. It was the Home of a Presidential visit to the Area by President George W. Bush October 31, 2002
