= 2019 NCAA Division II men's basketball tournament =

2019 men's basketball tournament in the United States

- Teams: 64
- Finals site: Ford Center, Evansville, Indiana
- Champions: Northwest Missouri State Bearcats (2nd title)
- Runner-up: Point Loma Sea Lions (1st title game)
- Semifinalists: Saint Anselm Hawks (1st Final Four); Southern Indiana Screaming Eagles (4th Final Four)
- Winning coach: Ben McCollum (2nd title)
- MOP: Trevor Hudgins (Northwest Missouri State)

The 2019 NCAA Division II men's basketball tournament was the 63rd annual single-elimination tournament to determine the national champion of men's NCAA Division II college basketball in the United States. Featuring sixty-four teams, it began on March 16 and concluded with the championship game on March 30.

The eight regional winners met at Ford Center in Evansville, Indiana for the Elite Eight, Final Four, and championship rounds. The tournament concluded with Northwest Missouri State winning its 2nd national title completing a 38–0 season.

2019 NCAA Division II Men's sites - regionals (cyan) Elite Eight (red)

== Qualification ==
A total of 64 bids are available for each tournament: 24 automatic bids (awarded to the champions of the twenty-two Division II conferences) and 40 at-large bids.

The sixty-four bids are allocated evenly among the eight NCAA-designated regions (Atlantic, Central, East, Midwest, South, South Central, Southeast, and West), each of which contains three of the twenty-four Division II conferences that sponsor men's basketball. Each region consists of three automatic qualifiers (the teams who won their respective conference tournaments) and five at-large bids (which are awarded regardless of conference affiliation).

Seven teams qualified for their first NCAA Division II tournament in 2019: Concordia-Irvine, Daemen, Emmanuel, Molloy, Notre Dame (Ohio), Nova Southeastern, and Walsh. Six of these teams lost their first-round game, with Nova Southeastern not only hosting the South Regional Tournament, but winning it, as well, advancing to the Elite Eight, before losing to St. Anselm.

== Regionals ==
=== Atlantic – Indiana, Pennsylvania ===
Location: Kovalchick Convention and Athletic Complex

First round Round of 64; March 16
1	Indiana (PA) (29–2)	74
8	West Chester (22–8)	65
5	Fairmont State (22–8)	60
4	Mercyhurst (23–6)	63*
3	Virginia State (27–4)	89
6	Notre Dame (OH) (23–6)	81
7	East Stroudsburg (21–7)	99
2	West Liberty (26–4)	106*

Regional semifinal Round of 32; March 17
1	Indiana (PA)	65
4	Mercyhurst	75
3	Virginia State	80
2	West Liberty	82

Regional Final; Sweet 16; March 19
4	Mercyhurst	82
2	West Liberty	70

* – Denotes overtime period

=== Central – Maryville, Missouri ===
Location: Bearcat Arena

First round Round of 64; March 16
1	NW Missouri State (32–0)	91
8	Minnesota State (18–11)	62
5	Southern Nazarene (28–5)	81
4	St. Cloud State (22–8)	61
3	Washburn (24–7)	100
6	Missouri Southern (23–7)	101
7	SE Oklahoma State (22–7)	115*
2	Northern State (26–6)	103

Regional semifinal Round of 32; March 17
1	NW Missouri State	70
5	Southern Nazarene	59
6	Missouri Southern	92
7	SE Oklahoma State	83

Regional Final; Sweet 16; March 19
1	NW Missouri State	82
6	Missouri Southern	70

* – Denotes overtime period

=== East – Goffstown, New Hampshire ===
Location: Stoutenburgh Gymnasium

First round Round of 64; March 16
1	Saint Anselm (22–5)	81
8	Molloy (21–9)	71
5	Daemen (24–5)	67
4	New Haven (20–9)	72
3	Le Moyne (18–9)	59
6	St. Thomas Aquinas (23–6)	61
7	Dominican (NY) (22–7)	64
2	Merrimack (26–6)	50

Regional semifinal Round of 32; March 17
1	Saint Anselm	70
4	New Haven	69
6	St. Thomas Aquinas	86*
7	Dominican (NY)	83

Regional Final; Sweet 16; March 19
1	Saint Anselm	74
6	St. Thomas Aquinas	49

* – Denotes overtime period

=== Midwest – Romeoville, Illinois ===
Location: Neil Carey Arena

First round Round of 64; March 16
1	Lewis (24–5)	65
8	Grand Valley State (19–12)	63
5	Ashland (23–6)	60
4	Southern Indiana (22–8)	66
3	Findlay (27–4)	71
6	Drury (21–11)	66
7	Walsh (24–7)	61
2	Bellarmine (26–4)	81

Regional semifinal Round of 32; March 17
1	Lewis	61
4	Southern Indiana	62
3	Findlay	59
2	Bellarmine	74

Regional Final; Sweet 16; March 19
4	Southern Indiana	76
2	Bellarmine	69

=== South – Fort Lauderdale, Florida ===
Location: Rick Case Arena

First round Round of 64; March 16
1	Nova Southeastern (26–3)	80
8	Miles (21–8)	66
5	West Alabama (22–7)	95
4	Valdosta State (24–6)	87
3	Lynn (23–6)	81
6	Alabama–Huntsville (24–7)	68
7	Delta State (19–11)	72
2	Florida Southern (24–7)	78

Regional semifinal Round of 32; March 17
1	Nova Southeastern	89
5	West Alabama	80
3	Lynn	88
2	Florida Southern	78

Regional Final; Sweet 16; March 19
1	Nova Southeastern	89
3	Lynn	74

=== Southeast – Charlotte, North Carolina ===
Location: Levine Center

First round Round of 64; March 16
1	Queens (28–4)	76
8	Emmanuel (GA) (25–9)	72
5	UNC Pembroke (21–9)	61
4	Catawba (23–7)	80
3	USC Aiken (26–5)	84
6	Lenoir–Rhyne (21–10)	71
7	Francis Marion (21–8)	70
2	Augusta (26–5)	77*

Regional semifinal Round of 32; March 17
1	Queens	96
4	Catawba	93
3	USC Aiken	89
2	Augusta	93*

Regional Final; Sweet 16; March 19
1	Queens	91
2	Augusta	78

* – Denotes overtime period

=== South Central – Canyon, Texas ===
Location: First United Bank Center

First round Round of 64; March 15
1	West Texas A&M (31–3)	109
8	New Mexico Highlands (22–9)	95
5	Dallas Baptist (23–9)	70
4	Texas A&M–Commerce (23–8)	72
3	Colorado Mines (25–5)	73
6	Lubbock Christian (20–9)	82
7	Angelo State (21–8)	81
2	St. Edward's (27–3)	82

Regional semifinal Round of 32; March 16
1	West Texas A&M	77
4	Texas A&M–Commerce	61
6	Lubbock Christian	80
2	St. Edward's	93

Regional Final; Sweet 16; March 19
1	West Texas A&M	89
2	St. Edward's	70

=== West – San Diego, California ===
Location: Golden Gymnasium

First round Round of 64; March 15
1	Point Loma (26–4)	70
8	Western Oregon (22–10)	58
5	Cal Poly Pomona (21–6)	50
4	UC San Diego (25–7)	61
3	Saint Martin's (24–5)	63
6	Concordia Irvine (23–10)	60
7	Chaminade (23–7)	75
2	Seattle Pacific (21–6)	77

Regional semifinal Round of 32; March 16
1	Point Loma	73
4	UC San Diego	50
3	Saint Martin's	67
2	Seattle Pacific	63

Regional Final; Sweet 16; March 18
1	Point Loma	60
3	Saint Martin's	54

== Elite Eight – Evansville, Indiana ==
National Quarterfinals; Elite Eight; March 27
1	NW Missouri State	55
8	Mercyhurst	51
4	Nova Southeastern	81
5	Saint Anselm	91
3	Queens	74
6	Point Loma	87
2	West Texas A&M	84
7	Southern Indiana	94

National semifinals Final Four; March 28
1	NW Missouri State	76
5	Saint Anselm	53
6	Point Loma	81
7	Southern Indiana	71

National Championship; March 30
1	NW Missouri State	64
6	Point Loma	58

== All-tournament team ==
- Alex Stein (Southern Indiana)
- Daulton Hommes (Point Loma)
- Tim Guers (Saint Anselm)
- Joey Withus (Northwest Missouri State)
- Trevor Hudgins (Northwest Missouri State)
