= Northern State Wolves men's basketball =

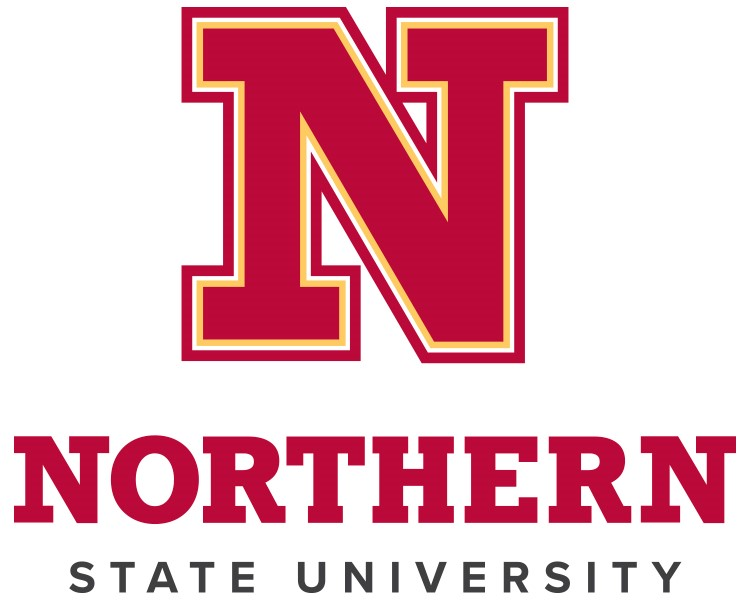
- University: Northern State University
- First season: 1902-03
- Athletic director: Nate Davis
- Head coach: Matt Wilber (1st season)
- Location: Aberdeen, South Dakota
- Arena: Wachs Arena (capacity: 8,057)
- Conference: NSIC
- Nickname: Wolves
- Colors: Maroon and gold
- All-time record: 1448–765

NCAA Division I tournament runner-up
- 2018*
Other NCAA Division I tournament results
Final Four	2018*
Elite Eight	1998*, 2018*
Sweet Sixteen	1998*, 2006*, 2008*, 2018*, 2021*
Appearances	1996*, 1997*, 1998*, 2004*, 2005*, 2006*, 2008*, 2009*, 2015*, 2018*, 2019*, 2020*, 2021*, 2023*

NAIA tournament runner-up
- 1993, 1994
Other NAIA tournament results
Appearances	1939, 1940, 1957, 1958, 1959, 1961, 1970, 1971, 1983, 1984, 1990, 1991, 1993, 1994, 1995

Conference tournament champions
- 2004, 2005, 2018, 2019, 2020, 2021

Conference regular-season champions
- 1907, 1908, 1909, 1910, 1917, 1924, 1936, 1940, 1941, 1942, 1953, 1954, 1956, 1957, 1958, 1959, 1960, 1961, 1963, 1966, 1970, 1971, 1975, 1976, 1978, 1984, 1985, 1993, 1995, 1996, 1998, 1999, 2002, 2003, 2018, 2019, 2020, 2023

Conference division champions
- 2018, 2019, 2020, 2021, 2023
- * at Division II level

The Northern State Wolves men's basketball team represents Northern State University as members of the Northern Sun Intercollegiate Conference at the NCAA Division II level. The Wolves play their home games at Wachs Arena in Aberdeen, South Dakota. Their current head coach is Matt Wilber.

== Championships ==
Northern State has won 39 Regular Season Championships, 6 Conference Tournament Championships, and 2 Central Region Tournament Championships

South Dakota State Conference

- Regular Season Championships (5 times): 1906–07, 1907–08, 1908–09, 1909–10, 1916–17

South Dakota Intercollegiate Conference

- Regular Season Championships (17 times): 1923–24, 1935–36, 1939–40, 1940–41, 1941–42, 1952–53, 1953–54, 1955–56, 1956–57, 1957–58, 1958–59, 1959–60, 1960–61, 1962–63, 1965–66, 1969–70, 1970–71

(Unknown Conference)

- Regular Season Championships (3 times): 1974–75, 1975–76, 1977–78

Northern Sun Intercollegiate Conference

- Regular Season Champions (13 times): 1983–84, 1984–85, 1992–93, 1994–95, 1995–96, 1997–98, 1998–99, 2001–02, 2002–03, 2017–18, 2018–19, 2019–20, 2022–23
- North Division Titles (5 times): 2017–18, 2018–19, 2019–20, 2020–21, 2022–23
- Conference Tournament Champions (6 times): 2004, 2005, 2018, 2019, 2020, 2021

NCAA Central Region

- Central Region Tournament Championships (2 times): 1998, 2018

== Coaches ==
=== Current Coaching Staff ===
Position	Name	Alma mater
Head Coach	Matt Wilber	Augustana
Assistant Coach	Jack Nelson	Winona State
Assistant Coach	Terrell Newton	Dakota Wesleyan

=== List of head coaches ===
Number	Name	Tenure
1	Fred W. Smith	1902–1909
2	Paul M. Young	1909–1910
3	Raymond L. Quigley	1910–1913
4	Frank L. Sieh	1913–1914
5	Clyde Fullerton	1914–1915
6	Lloyd R. Brown	1915–1916
7	Arthur L. Strum	1916–1917
8	William Wallace	1917–1918
9	Coach Gillis	1918–1919
10	Verne Collinge	1919–1920
11	Jacob Speelman	1920–1926
12	Joe Swetland	1926–1927
13	Telfer L. Mead	1927–1929
14	Robert Campbell	1929–1934
15	William L. Carberry	1934–1938
16	Harley L. Robertson	1938–1942
17	William L. Carberry	1942–1946
18	Clark Swisher	1946–1955
19	Bob Wachs	1955–1985
20	Bob Olson	1985–1999
21	Don Meyer	1999–2010
22	Paul Sather	2010–2019
23	Saul Phillips	2019–2025
24	Matt Wilber	2025–present

== Arenas ==
- Wachs Arena 1986–present

== All–Americans ==
- Harry Marske (1959)
- Mel Klein (1961)
- Jim Schlekeway (1968)
- Gary Evjen (1971)
- Bill Christensen (1975)
- Scott Bosanko (1981)
- Kevin King (1984)
- Scott Deadrick (1985)
- Kevin Burckhard (1993–94)
- Chad Hauger (1993)
- Eric Kline (1993–95)
- Lance Luitjens (1995)
- Jeremy Vliem (1995)
- Ryan Miller (1998)
- Brad Hansen (2002)
- Kevin Ratzsch (2009)
- Parker Fox (2021)
- Sam Masten (2023)

== NSIC awards ==
All-NSIC

- Scott Bosanko (1980–81)
- Scott Kusler (1981–82)
- Kevin King (1982–84)
- Scott Deadrick (1983–85)
- Gene Lorenz (1985)
- Todd Jordre (1985)
- James Griffin (1986–87)
- Jeff Turner (1987)
- Shane Warwick (1988)
- Keith Moore (1989–90)
- Jason Boike (1990)
- Sarge Grimes (1991)
- Bob Upgren (1991)
- Donny Godel (1992)
- Doug Vieto (1992)
- Eric Kline (1993–95)
- Kevin Burckhard (1993–94)
- Lance Luitjens (1995–96)
- Scott Boekelheide (1995)
- Jeremy Vliem (1996–97)
- Ryan Miller (1997–98)
- Ross Pankratz (1998)
- Mark Rich (1999)
- Scott Hanson (2000)
- Brad Hansen (2002)
- Sundance Wicks (2002–03)
- Jerod Obering (2003)
- Adam Grant (2004)
- Matt Hammer (2004–06)
- Steve Smiley (2004)
- Aaron Busack (2005–06)
- Craig Nelson (2006–08)
- Kevin Ratzsch (2007–09)
- Levi Hamilton (2007–08)
- Luke Wicks (2008)
- Mitch Boeck (2010)
- Collin Pryor (2011 and 2013)
- Dustin Tetzlaff (2012–13)
- Seth Bachand (2015)
- Tydan Storrusten (2015)
- Skye Warwick (2016)
- Darin Peterka (2016 and 2018)
- Logan Doyle (2017–18)
- Ian Smith (2017–19)
- Mack Arvidson (2017)
- DJ Pollard (2018)
- Justin Decker (2019)
- Gabe King (2019–20)
- Parker Fox (2020–21)
- Mason Stark (2020–21)
- Andrew Kallman (2021)
- Tommy Chatman (2021)
- Jordan Belka (2022–23)
- Sam Masten (2022–23)
- Jacksen Moni (2023–24)
- Josh Dilling (2024)
- Joshua Book (2026)

Coach of the Year

- Bob Wachs (1985)
- Bob Olson (1991, 1993, 1995–96, 1998)
- Don Meyer (2002–03)
- Paul Sather (2018–19)
- Saul Phillips (2021, 2023)
