= Don Meyer =

American basketball player and coach (1944–2014)

Biographical details
- Born: December 16, 1944; Wayne, Nebraska, U.S.
- Died: May 18, 2014 (aged 69); Aberdeen, South Dakota, U.S.

Playing career
- 1967: Northern Colorado

Coaching career (HC unless noted)
- 1968–1970: Western State (assistant)
- 1970–1972: Utah (assistant)
- 1972–1975: Hamline
- 1975–1999: Lipscomb
- 1999–2010: Northern State

Head coaching record
- Overall: 923–324 (.740)

Accomplishments and honors

Championships
- NAIA (1986); 2 NSIC regular season (2002, 2003); 2 NSIC tournament (2004, 2005)

Awards
- Coach Wooden "Keys to Life" Award (2010); John Bunn Award (2010); 2x NSIC Coach of the Year (2002, 2003)

Donald Wayne Meyer (December 16, 1944 – May 18, 2014) was an American college basketball coach who completed his career in 2010 as head coach of the men's team at Northern State University. He was previously head coach at Hamline University and Lipscomb University.

== Early life ==
Meyer was born in 1944 in Wayne, Nebraska. Meyer graduated with a major in physical education from the University of Northern Colorado and excelled in baseball and basketball, being named an NCAA All-American in 1966 while playing in the 1966 NCAA College Division basketball tournament. He graduated in 1967.

== College basketball coaching career ==
Meyer held the record for most wins by a men's basketball coach whose career included at least one stint with an NCAA member school, until it was surpassed by Duke University coach Mike Krzyzewski in November 2011. His career win total includes stints as a NAIA coach.

He is the subject of the book, Playing for Coach Meyer written by Steve Smiley, who played for Meyer as a point guard (1999–2004), and who served as an assistant coach from 2006 to 2008. Meyer is also the subject of a more extensive biography, How Lucky You Can Be: The Story of Coach Don Meyer, written by ESPN baseball analyst Buster Olney, who has had a close relationship with Meyer since Olney was assigned to cover baseball in Nashville while Meyer was coaching at Lipscomb.

Pat Summitt cites Meyer as a major influence on her development as a coach, noting in a 2009 interview:

He taught me how to teach others how to play the game. When I started coaching at Tennessee, I was 22 years old. I had four players that were seniors. And I never coached a day in my life. So did Coach Meyer help me? Tremendously.

He had 3 major rules:

1. Everybody takes notes.
2. Everybody says "please" and "thank you".
3. Everybody picks up trash.

== Accident and cancer ==
Meyer had cancer that was discovered in his liver and intestines (bowels) during emergency surgery after a car crash on September 5, 2008. His lower left leg had to be amputated below the knee due to injuries from the car crash. During the surgery they found cancer and later operated on it.

== Awards ==
At the ESPY Awards 2009, Meyer was awarded the Jimmy V (Jim Valvano) Award For Perseverance.

In February 2011, Coach Meyer was inducted into the Tennessee Sports Hall of Fame not only for his basketball coaching skills and records but was also recognized as an outstanding collegiate basketball and baseball athlete and administrator.

In 2011, Meyer was inducted into the NSIC Hall of Fame, and then in 2012 he was inducted into the South Dakota Hall of Fame. In 2013, Meyer was also named to the South Dakota Sports Hall of Fame.

== Retirement and death ==
On February 22, 2010, Northern State announced that Meyer would be retiring at the end of the 2009–10 season after 38 years of coaching. Later that year, on June 30, the Naismith Memorial Basketball Hall of Fame announced that Meyer was that year's recipient of the John Bunn Award, given by the Hall for significant contributions to the sport.

Casey Bond, a Lipscomb alum, produced the independent film about Meyer called My Many Sons, along with producing partner Brad Wilson. The film was produced on a budget of between $2 million and $5 million under Bond and Wilson's production company, Higher Purpose Entertainment, and was released in 2015, starring Judge Reinhold as Meyer. The filming took place in Nashville, Tennessee and Aberdeen, South Dakota.

Meyer died of complications from his cancer on May 18, 2014, aged 69, in Aberdeen, South Dakota.

== Head coaching record ==
Record table
Season	Team	Overall	Conference	Standing	Postseason
Hamline Pipers (Minnesota Intercollegiate Athletic Conference) (1972–1975)
1972–73	Hamline	5–20			
1973–74	Hamline	16–10			
1974–75	Hamline	16–11			NCAA D–III Quarterfinals
Hamline:		37–41			
Lipscomb Bisons (Volunteer State Athletic Conference) (1975–1985)
1975–76	Lipscomb	11–19			
1976–77	Lipscomb	18–9			
1977–78	Lipscomb	21–6			
1978–79	Lipscomb	21–12			
1979–80	Lipscomb	15–15			
1980–81	Lipscomb	25–11			
1981–82	Lipscomb	33–4			NAIA First Round
1982–83	Lipscomb	19–14			
1983–84	Lipscomb	30–5			
1984–85	Lipscomb	25–9			NAIA Second Round
Lipscomb Bisons (Tennessee Collegiate Athletic Conference) (1985–1996)
1985–86	Lipscomb	35–4			NAIA Champions
1986–87	Lipscomb	27–6			
1987–88	Lipscomb	33–3			NAIA Second Round
1988–89	Lipscomb	38–2			
1989–90	Lipscomb	41–5			NAIA Semifinals
1990–91	Lipscomb	35–4			NAIA Quarterfinals
1991–92	Lipscomb	31–5			NAIA Second Round
1992–93	Lipscomb	34–4			NAIA Quarterfinals
1993–94	Lipscomb	29–6			NAIA First Round
1994–95	Lipscomb	30–7			NAIA Second Round
1995–96	Lipscomb	33–6			NAIA Semifinals
Lipscomb Bisons (TranSouth Athletic Conference) (1996–1999)
1996–97	Lipscomb	30–6			NAIA First Round
1997–98	Lipscomb	26–8			
1998–99	Lipscomb	25–9			NAIA First Round
Lipscomb:		665–179			
Northern State Wolves (Northern Sun Intercollegiate Conference) (1999–2010)
1999–00	Northern State	13–14	10–8	5th	
2000–01	Northern State	14–13	10–8	5th	
2001–02	Northern State	20–8	14–4	T–1st	
2002–03	Northern State	20–9	15–3	1st	
2003–04	Northern State	24–7	13–3	2nd	NCAA D–II First Round
2004–05	Northern State	21–10	9–5	3rd	NCAA D–II First Round
2005–06	Northern State	27–6	11–3	2nd	NCAA D–II Regional Final
2006–07	Northern State	21–8	13–5	T–3rd	
2007–08	Northern State	29–4	16–2	2nd	NCAA D–II Regional Final
2008–09	Northern State	19–11	8–5	7th	NCAA D–II First Round
2009–10	Northern State	13–14	9–11	T–9th	
Northern State:		221–104	128–59		
Total:		923–324			
National champion Postseason invitational champion Conference regular season champion Conference regular season and conference tournament champion Division regular season champion Division regular season and conference tournament champion Conference tournament champion

== See also ==
- List of college men's basketball career coaching wins leaders
