= 2018 NCAA Division II men's basketball tournament =

- Teams: 64
- Finals site: Sanford Pentagon, Sioux Falls, South Dakota
- Champions: Ferris State Bulldogs (1st title)
- Runner-up: Northern State Wolves (1st title game)
- Semifinalists: Queens Royals (2nd Final Four); West Texas A&M Buffaloes (1st Final Four)
- Winning coach: Andy Bronkema (1st title)
- MOP: Zach Hankins (Ferris State)

The 2018 NCAA Division II men's basketball tournament is the 62nd annual single-elimination tournament to determine the national champion of men's NCAA Division II college basketball in the United States. Featuring sixty-four teams, it began on March 9, and concluded with the championship game on March 24.

The eight regional winners met in the Elite Eight for the quarterfinal, semifinal, and championship rounds. For the second consecutive year, the Elite Eight was held at the Sanford Pentagon in Sioux Falls, South Dakota.

Ferris State defeated Northern State, 71–69, to win the first national championship in the school's history.

2018 NCAA Division II Men's sites - regionals (cyan) Elite Eight (red)

== Qualification ==
A total of 64 bids are available for each tournament: 24 automatic bids (awarded to the champions of the twenty-two Division II conferences) and 40 at-large bids.

The sixty-four bids are allocated evenly among the eight NCAA-designated regions (Atlantic, Central, East, Midwest, South, South Central, Southeast, and West), each of which contains three of the twenty-four Division II conferences that sponsor men's basketball. Each region consists of three automatic qualifiers (the teams who won their respective conference tournaments) and five at-large bids (which are awarded regardless of conference affiliation).

Six teams qualified for their first NCAA Division II tournament in 2018: Lees–McRae, Ohio Dominican, Point Loma Nazarene, Saint Martin's, Southern Nazarene, and West Florida.

== Regionals ==
=== Atlantic – Petersburg, Virginia ===
Location: VSU Multi-Purpose Center

First round Round of 64; March 10
1	Virginia State (24–4)	81
8	Virginia Union (18–14)	76
5	Shippensburg (23–7)	98
4	West Liberty (26–3)	66
3	Wheeling Jesuit (26–5)	77
6	West Chester (21–6)	82
7	Gannon (22–9)	69
2	East Stroudsburg (24–5)	78

Regional semifinal Round of 32; March 11
1	Virginia State	58
5	Shippensburg	77
6	West Chester	76
2	East Stroudsburg	90

Regional final Sweet 16; March 13
5	Shippensburg	72
2	East Stroudsburg	84

=== Central – Maryville, Missouri ===
Location: Bearcat Arena

First round Round of 64; March 10
1	NW Missouri State (27–3)	50
8	Minnesota State (22–9)	60
5	Missouri So. State (20–9)	77
4	SW Minnesota State (24–8)	81
3	Southern Nazarene (27–2)	68
6	St. Cloud State (23–8)	81
7	Washburn (22–9)	73
2	Northern State (31–3)	93

Regional semifinal Round of 32; March 11
8	Minnesota State	74
4	SW Minnesota State	70
6	St. Cloud State	61
2	Northern State	68

Regional final Sweet 16; March 13
8	Minnesota State	83
2	Northern State	90

=== East – DeWitt, New York ===
Location: Le Moyne Events Center

First round Round of 64; March 10
1	Le Moyne (24–6)	75
8	Jefferson (21–13)	57
5	Saint Rose (20–9)	83
4	Saint Anselm (22–8)	71
3	Bridgeport (25–5)	70
6	Merrimack (19–11)	85
7	Bloomfield (22–7)	91
2	St. Thomas Aquinas (26–6)	78

Regional semifinal Round of 32; March 11
1	Le Moyne	67
5	Saint Rose	63
6	Merrimack	91
7	Bloomfield	109

Regional final Sweet 16; March 13
1	Le Moyne	75
7	Bloomfield	59

=== Midwest – Big Rapids, Michigan ===
Location: Jim Wink Arena

First round Round of 64; March 10
1	Ferris State (32–1)	75
8	Ohio Dominican (20–10)	57
5	Hillsdale (21–9)	67
4	Lake Superior State (24–7)	81
3	Findlay (26–4)	84
6	Drury (21–7)	65
7	Truman (20–10)	65
2	Bellarmine (28–2)	82

Regional semifinal Round of 32; March 11
1	Ferris State	94
4	Lake Superior State	71
3	Findlay	74
2	Bellarmine	73

Regional final Sweet 16; March 13
1	Ferris State	80
3	Findlay	65

=== South – Atlanta, Georgia ===
Location: Forbes Arena

First round Round of 64; March 10
1	Morehouse (25–2)	97
8	Florida Southern (20–10)	98*
5	Valdosta State (26–4)	81
4	Eckerd (24–6)	85
3	Claflin (25–6)	72
6	Clark Atlanta (24–5)	61
7	Barry (20–8)	90
2	West Florida (28–3)	73

Regional semifinal Round of 32; March 11
8	Florida Southern	77
4	Eckerd	90
3	Claflin	64
7	Barry	89

Regional final Sweet 16; March 13
4	Eckerd	72
7	Barry	79

* – Denotes overtime period

=== Southeast – Harrogate, Tennessee ===
Location: B. Frank "Tex" Turner Arena

First round Round of 64; March 10
1	Lincoln Memorial (30–1)	90
8	King (19–10)	78
5	Carson–Newman (23–7)	69
4	Clayton State (23–6)	75
3	UNC Pembroke (26–5)	75
6	Francis Marion (20–9)	72
7	Lees–McRae (23–8)	69
2	Queens (NC) (28–3)	90

Regional semifinal Round of 32; March 11
1	Lincoln Memorial	87
4	Clayton State	61
3	UNC Pembroke	63
2	Queens (NC)	75

Regional final Sweet 16; March 13
1	Lincoln Memorial	57
2	Queens (NC)	69

=== South Central – Canyon, Texas ===
Location: First United Bank Center

First round Round of 64; March 10
1	West Texas A&M (27–4)	79
8	Colorado Mines (22–8)	65
5	Fort Lewis (21–8)	62
4	Texas A&M–Commerce (24–6)	78
3	Regis (26–5)	87
6	Dallas Baptist (26–5)	82
7	Arkansas–Fort Smith (24–5)	69
2	UT Permian Basin (25–5)	87

Regional semifinal Round of 32; March 11
1	West Texas A&M	93
4	Texas A&M–Commerce	70
3	Regis	124
2	UT Permian Basin	130****

Regional final Sweet 16; March 13
1	West Texas A&M	95
2	UT Permian Basin	87

* – Denotes overtime period

=== West – Monmouth, Oregon ===
Location: WOU Physical Education Building

First round Round of 64; March 9
1	Western Oregon (29–1)	73
8	Point Loma (21–9)	66
5	Saint Martin's (24–8)	66
4	Cal Poly Pomona (23–6)	58
3	California Baptist (25–5)	81
6	UC San Diego (21–10)	67
7	Azusa Pacific (20–10)	69
2	Dixie State (23–6)	65

Regional semifinal Round of 32; March 10
1	Western Oregon	77
5	Saint Martin's	55
3	California Baptist	72
7	Azusa Pacific	68

Regional final Sweet 16; March 12
1	Western Oregon	76
3	California Baptist	80

== Elite Eight – Sioux Falls, South Dakota ==
National Quarterfinals; Elite Eight; March 20
1	Ferris State	87
8	Barry	84
4	West Texas A&M	87
5	Le Moyne	73
2	Queens (NC)	100
7	California Baptist	94
3	Northern State	79
6	East Stroudsburg	71

National semifinals Final Four; March 22
1	Ferris State	85
4	West Texas A&M	79
2	Queens (NC)	99
3	Northern State	105**

National championship March 24
1	Ferris State	71
3	Northern State	69
