= Ferris State Bulldogs =

Intercollegiate sports teams of Ferris State University

- University: Ferris State University
- Nickname: Bulldogs
- NCAA: Division II
- Conference: GLIAC (main); CCHA (ice hockey)
- Athletic director: Steve Brockelbank
- Location: Big Rapids, Michigan
- Varsity teams: 15
- Football stadium: Top Taggart Field
- Basketball arena: Jim Wink Arena
- Ice hockey arena: Ewigleben Arena
- Softball stadium: FSU Softball Field
- Soccer stadium: FSU Soccer Field
- Other venues: Ewigleben Sports Arena
- Colors: Crimson and gold
- Mascot: Brutus
- Website: www.ferrisstatebulldogs.com
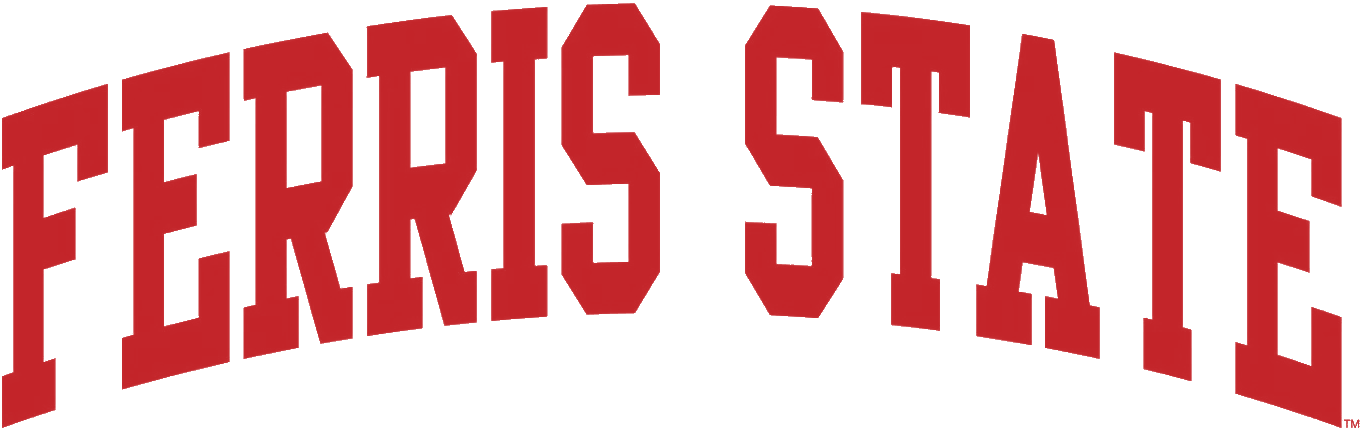

The Ferris State Bulldogs (FSU Bulldogs) are the athletic teams that represent Ferris State University, located in Big Rapids, Michigan, in NCAA Division II intercollegiate sporting competitions. The Bulldogs compete as members of the Great Lakes Intercollegiate Athletic Conference (GLAIC) for 14 of 15 varsity sports, while the men's hockey team, the only team that competes at the NCAA Division I level, plays in the Central Collegiate Hockey Association (CCHA). The Bulldogs have been members of the GLIAC since 1972.

Ferris' men's club ice hockey won the American Collegiate Hockey Association Division 2 national title in 1994, the men's basketball team won the NCAA Division II national title in 2018, and the football program won the Division II national title in 2021, 2022, 2024, and 2025.

== Varsity teams ==
Men's sports	Women's sports
Basketball	Basketball
Cross country	Cross country
Football	Golf
Golf	Soccer
Ice hockey	Softball
Tennis	Tennis
Track and field^{†}	Track and field^{†}
	Volleyball
† – Track and field includes both indoor and outdoor

=== Basketball ===
Led by power forward/center Zach Hankins in 2015-16, who had 130 blocks on the season, which led Division II and set the school single-season school record, the team won a Great Lakes Intercollegiate Athletic Conference (GLIAC) regular-season and tournament title and had a then-school record for wins with a 28–5 record. Ferris State reached the second round of the 2017 NCAA Division II Tournament before falling to GLIAC rival Findlay 68–63. In his junior season, Hankins averaged 15.1 points, 9.7 rebounds, and 3.3 blocks per game and had a field goal percentage of 63 percent. His 128 blocks led the nation. Hankins repeated as GLIAC Player of the Year. He was named the National Player of the Year by the National Association of Basketball Coaches. On the season, Ferris State compiled a 38–1 record and claimed the school’s first national championship in the 2018 NCAA Division II Tournament, defeating Northern State in the final by a score of 71–69.

=== Football ===
The Bulldogs had good success after Tony Annese was hired, winning multiple GLIAC championships with quarterback Jason Vanderlann. Their first playoff win was vs 7 seed Texas A&M Commerce at home in 2015, while they got beat by ODU in 2014 and GVSU in 2015, both GVSU and ODU were in-conference teams who were lower seeds, and both losses came in Big Rapids at home. In 2016, Ferris State defeated rival Grand Valley in the playoffs in Allendale. The win sent the Bulldogs to the National Semifinals. In 2017 the Bulldogs returned to the playoffs and defeated Ouachita Baptist and Fort Hays St before losing to Harding in a 16–14 Regional Championship. The Bulldogs are currently 7–2 vs arch-rival GVSU under Coach Annese.

Annese guided the team to its first national championship appearance in 2018 before losing to Valdosta State 49–47. In 2021, the Bulldogs returned again to the playoffs and would win their first national championship in school history by defeating Valdosta State 58–17. In 2022, they made it back to the national championship claiming their second in school history going back-to-back by defeating the Colorado School of Mines. In 2024, the team returned to the national championship game, defeating Valdosta State 49–14 to claim a third title.

=== Ice hockey ===
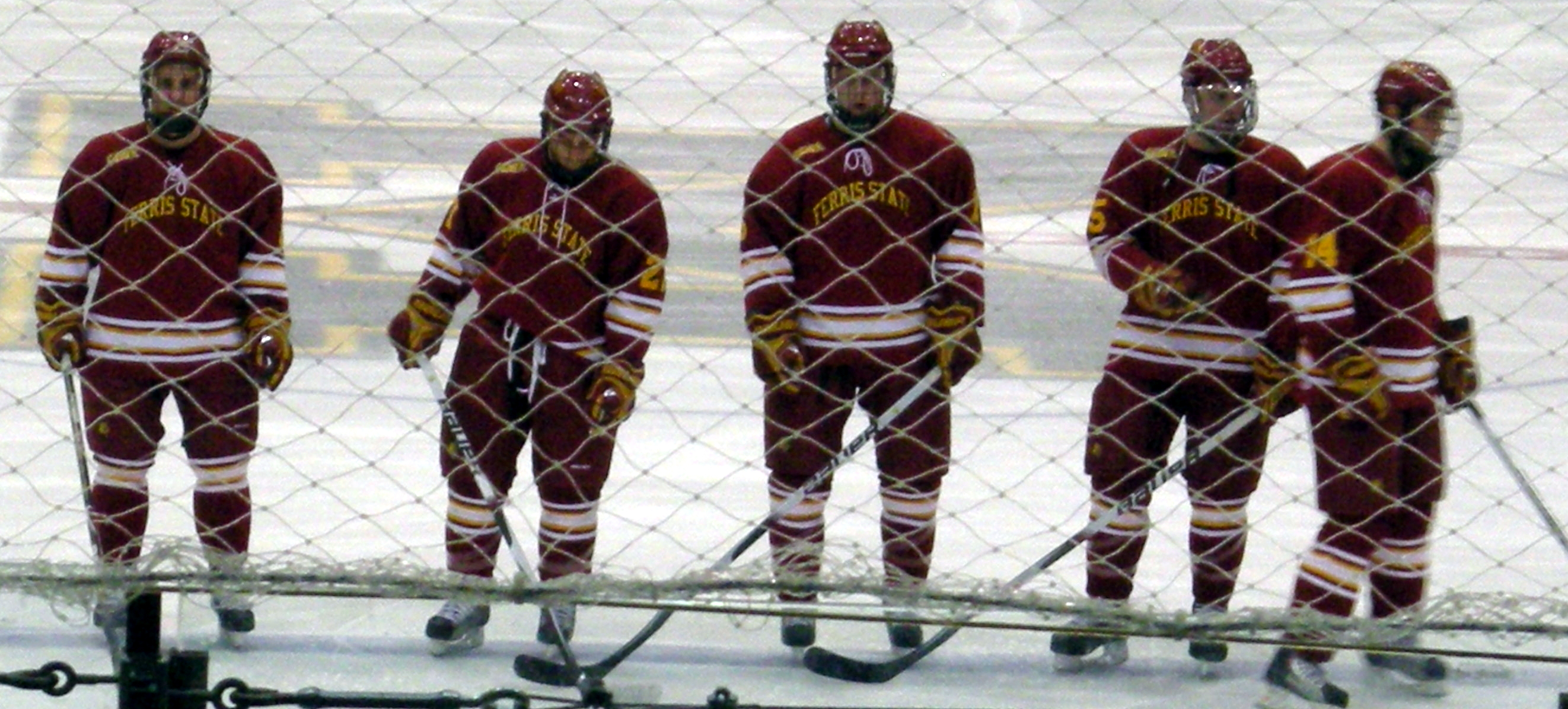
Ferris State's 2009-10 ice hockey starting lineup before a game against Michigan at Yost Ice Arena

The 2011–12 season marked the first time in school history that the Bulldogs reached the NCAA Division I Ice Hockey national championship finals. In the national championship match at the Frozen Four the Bulldogs lost 4–1 to Boston College in the title contest, leading to the cheer "Save Ferris" . The season came to a close with a 26–12–5 overall record and included a trip to the Frozen Four and a national runner-up finish. Ferris State's 26 wins were the second-most in school history, and the season highlights also included the school's second-ever Central Collegiate Hockey Association (CCHA) Regular-Season Championship and a Midwest Regional crown.

Prior to the 2011–12 season, the program's best season performance in the NCAA Division I was the 2002/03 campaign with a school-best 31–10–1 overall record. The Bulldogs also claimed their first-ever CCHA Regular-Season Championship title with a first-place 22–5–1 league mark and advanced to the NCAA Championship Tournament's West Regional title game in their initial NCAA Tourney appearance. Ferris State also earned the distinction of being the nation's first team to reach the 30-win plateau in 2002/03 and also competed in the CCHA Super Six Championship Tourney for the first time since 1993.

== Facilities ==
The Ferris Ice Arena and Sports Complex features basketball courts, volleyball courts, hockey rink and a general ice-skating rink located in the Ewigleben Arena, named after former college president Robert Ewigleben. This sports complex hosts university and high school competitions as well as community sports programs.

== Championships ==
National Championships:

- 2018: Men's Basketball—NCAA Division II
- 2021: Football–NCAA Division II
- 2022: Football–NCAA Division II
- 2024: Football–NCAA Division II
- 2025: Football–NCAA Division II

National Runners-up:

- 1989: Wrestling—NCAA Division II
- 2004: Women's Golf—NCAA Division II
- 2006: Women's Golf—NCAA Division II
- 2012: Men's Ice Hockey—NCAA Division I
- 2018: Football—NCAA Division II

Club Sports National Championships:

- 1994: Men's Ice Hockey—ACHA Division 2
