= 2021 Northern State Wolves football team =

American college football season

2021 Northern State Wolves football
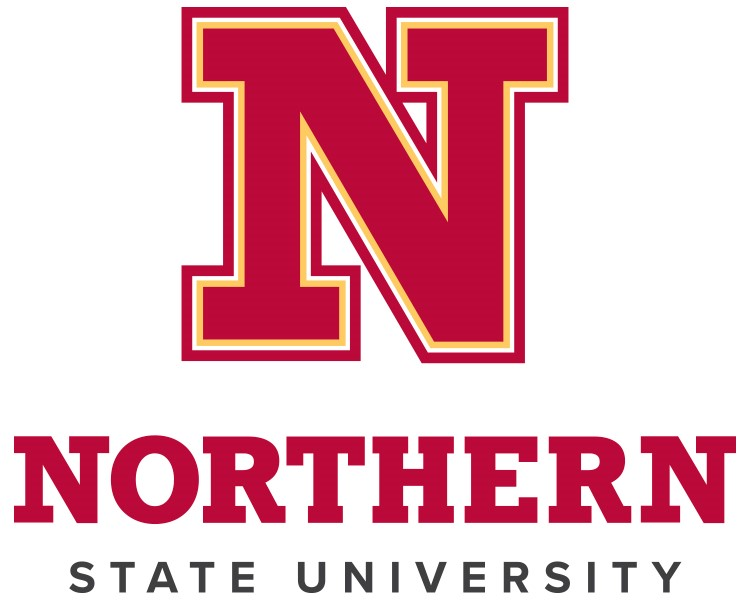
- Conference: Northern Sun Intercollegiate Conference
- North Division
- Record: 7–4 (7–4 NSIC)
- Head coach: Mike Schmidt (1st season)
- Offensive coordinator: Isaac Fruechte (1st season)
- Defensive coordinator: Jeff Larson (1st season)
- Home stadium: Dacotah Bank Stadium

2021 Northern Sun Intercollegiate Conference football standings
| | Conf. | | | Overall |
| Team | W | | L | W | | L |
|---|---|---|---|---|---|---|
North
| No. 19 Bemidji State x$^ | 9 | – | 2 | 10 | – | 3 |
| Minnesota–Duluth x^ | 9 | – | 2 | 9 | – | 3 |
| Northern State | 7 | – | 4 | 7 | – | 4 |
| MSU Moorhead | 5 | – | 6 | 5 | – | 6 |
| Mary | 3 | – | 3 | 4 | – | 7 |
| Minot State | 2 | – | 9 | 2 | – | 9 |
| Concordia–St. Paul | 1 | – | 10 | 1 | – | 10 |
South
| Augustana (SD) x^ | 9 | – | 2 | 9 | – | 3 |
| Sioux Falls | 8 | – | 3 | 8 | – | 3 |
| Winona State | 7 | – | 4 | 7 | – | 4 |
| Wayne State (NE) | 7 | – | 4 | 7 | – | 4 |
| Minnesota State | 6 | – | 5 | 6 | – | 5 |
| SW Minnesota State | 2 | – | 9 | 2 | – | 9 |
| Upper Iowa | 1 | – | 10 | 1 | – | 10 |
$ – Conference champion; x – Division champion/co-champions; ^ – NCAA Division II playoff participant; Rankings from AFCA Poll

The 2021 Northern State Wolves football team represented Northern State University as a member North Division of the Northern Sun Intercollegiate Conference (NSIC) during the 2021 NCAA Division II football season. Led by first-year head coach Mike Schmidt, the Wolves compiled an overall record of 7–4 with an identical mark in conference played, placing third in the NCIS North Division. The 2021 season marked the opening of Dacotah Bank Stadium in Aberdeen, South Dakota, where Northern State played home games.

Due to the COVID-19 pandemic, the Northern Sun Intercollegiate Conference's 2020 season was cancelled. The 2020 season would have marked the first season for head coach Mike Schmidt who was hired in December 2019.

== Schedule ==
| Date | Opponent | Site | Result | Attendance | Source |
|---|---|---|---|---|---|
| September 2 | at No. 2 Minnesota State | Blakeslee Stadium; Mankato, MN | L 34–40 ^{OT} | 4,369 | |
| September 11 | Southwest Minnesota State | Dacotah Bank Stadium; Aberdeen, SD | W 30–13 | 5,867 | |
| September 18 | at Upper Iowa | Harms-Eischeid Stadium; Fayette, IA | W 40–22 | 1,082 | |
| September 25 | Sioux Falls | Dacotah Bank Stadium; Aberdeen, SD | W 41–10 | 4,723 | |
| October 2 | Mary | Dacotah Bank Stadium; Aberdeen, SD | L 42–49 | 5,971 | |
| October 9 | at Winona State | Altra Federal Credit Union Stadium; Winona, MN | W 52–49 | 4,252 | |
| October 16 | Minot State | Dacotah Bank Stadium; Aberdeen, SD | W 36–35 | 3,886 | |
| October 23 | at Concordia–St. Paul | Sea Foam Stadium; St. Paul, MN | W 38–17 | 1,393 | |
| October 30 | at Minnesota State–Moorhead | Nemzek Stadium; Moorhead, MN | W 33–27 | 1,122 | |
| November 6 | Bemidji State | Dacotah Bank Stadium; Aberdeen, SD | L 34–36 | 4,127 | |
| November 13 | at No. 23 Minnesota–Duluth | James S. Malosky Stadium; Duluth, MN | L 35–49 | 1,716 | |
Rankings from AFCA Poll released prior to the game
