= 2023 Northern State Wolves football team =

American college football season

2023 Northern State Wolves football
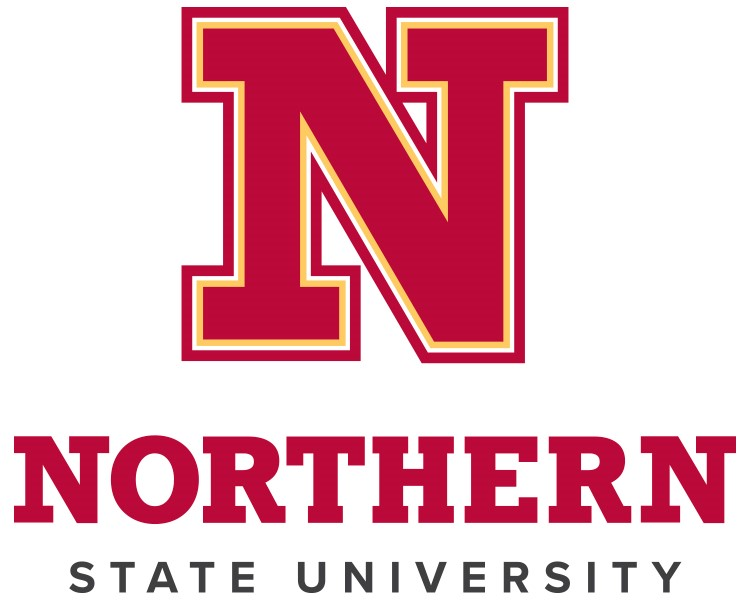
- Conference: Northern Sun Intercollegiate Conference
- Record: 5–6 (4–6 NSIC)
- Head coach: Mike Schmidt (3rd season)
- Offensive coordinator: Ryan Schlichte (2nd season)
- Defensive coordinator: Jeff Larson (3rd season)
- Home stadium: Dacotah Bank Stadium

2023 Northern Sun Intercollegiate Conference football standings
	Conf.			Overall
Team	W		L	W		L
No. 13 Augustana (SD) $^	9	–	1	11	–	2
No. 25 Minnesota Duluth	8	–	2	9	–	2
No. 16 Bemidji State ^	8	–	2	9	–	3
No. 21 Minnesota State ^	8	–	2	9	–	3
Wayne State (NE)	7	–	3	8	–	3
MSU Moorhead	6	–	4	7	–	4
Winona State	5	–	5	5	–	6
Northern State	4	–	6	5	–	6
Sioux Falls	3	–	7	3	–	8
Concordia–St. Paul	2	–	8	3	–	8
SW Minnesota State	2	–	8	2	–	9
Mary	2	–	8	2	–	9
Minot State	1	–	9	1	–	10
$ – Conference champion; ^ – NCAA Division II playoff participant; Rankings from AFCA Poll

The 2023 Northern State Wolves football team represented Northern State University as a member of the Northern Sun Intercollegiate Conference (NSIC) during the 2023 NCAA Division II football season. The Wolves were led by third-year head coach Mike Schmidt.

== Schedule ==
Date	Time	Opponent	Site	Result	Attendance
August 31	6:00 p.m.	at No. 11 Bemidji State	Chet Anderson Stadium; Bemidji, MN	L 13–49	
September 9	6:00 p.m.	Minnesota Duluth	Dacotah Bank Stadium; Aberdeen, SD	L 21–41	5,128
September 16	6:00 p.m.	Mary	Dacotah Bank Stadium; Aberdeen, SD	W 41–10	5,477
September 23	1:30 p.m.	at Winona State	Maxwell Field at Warrior Stadium; Winona, MN	L 16–39	3,323
September 30	12:00 p.m.	at Minnesota State–Moorhead	Alex Nemzek Stadium; Moorhead, MN	L 26–45	2,000
October 7	2:30 p.m.	Minot State	Dacotah Bank Stadium; Aberdeen, SD	W 46–9	6,793
October 14	4:00 p.m.	at Southwest Minnesota State	Mattke Field at the Regional Events Center; Marshall, MN	W 24–17	2,891
October 21	6:00 p.m.	Wayne State (NE)	Dacotah Bank Stadium; Aberdeen, SD	W 28–26	4,549
October 28	12:00 p.m.	at Concordia–St. Paul	Sea Foam Stadium; St. Paul, MN	L 14–20	799
November 4	2:00 p.m.	No. 21 Augustana (SD)	Dacotah Bank Stadium; Aberdeen, SD	L 21–31	4,519
November 11	12:00 p.m.	at Northern Michigan*	Superior Dome; Marquette, MI	W 44–20	2,101
*Non-conference game; Rankings from AFCA Poll released prior to the game; All times are in Central time
