= 2022 Northern State Wolves football team =

American college football season

2022 Northern State Wolves football
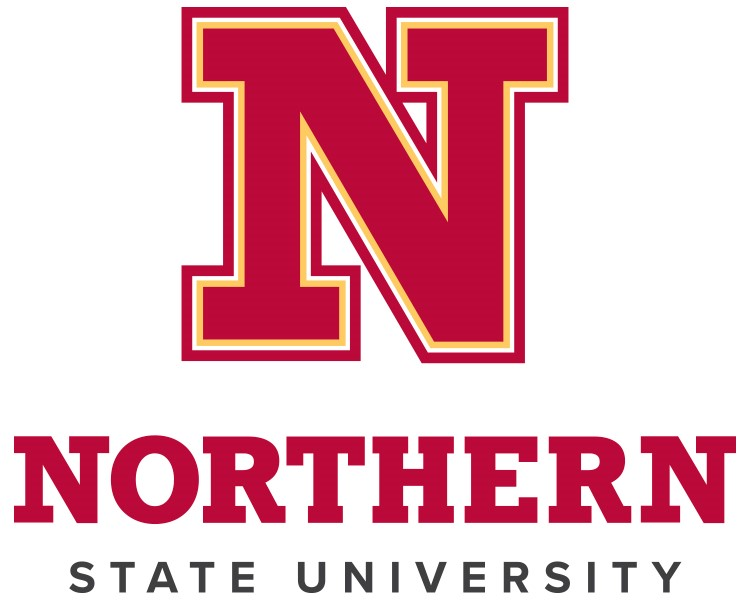
- Conference: Northern Sun Intercollegiate Conference
- North Division
- Record: 6–5 (6–5 NSIC)
- Head coach: Mike Schmidt (2nd season)
- Offensive coordinator: Ryan Schlichte (1st season)
- Defensive coordinator: Jeff Larson (2nd season)
- Home stadium: Dacotah Bank Stadium

2022 Northern Sun Intercollegiate Conference football standings
	Conf.			Overall
Team	W		L	W		L
North Division
No. 24 Bemidji State x+^	9	–	2	10	–	3
Minnesota Duluth	8	–	3	8	–	3
Northern State	6	–	5	6	–	5
MSU Moorhead	4	–	7	4	–	7
Mary	2	–	9	2	–	9
Minot State	1	–	10	1	–	10
Concordia–St. Paul	1	–	10	1	–	10
South Division
No. 14 Minnesota State x+^	9	–	2	10	–	3
Wayne State (NE) +^	9	–	2	9	–	3
Winona State ^	8	–	3	8	–	4
Sioux Falls	8	–	3	8	–	3
Augustana (SD)	7	–	4	7	–	4
SW Minnesota State	4	–	7	4	–	7
Upper Iowa	1	–	10	1	–	10
+ – Conference co-champions; x – Division champion/co-champions; ^ – NCAA Division II playoff participant; Rankings from AFCA Poll

The 2022 Northern State Wolves football team represented Northern State University as a member of the Northern Sun Intercollegiate Conference (NSIC) during the 2022 NCAA Division II football season. The Wolves were led by second-year head coach Mike Schmidt.

The Wolves finished the season at 6–5 (6–5 NSIC)

== Schedule ==
Date	Opponent	Site	Result	Attendance
September 1	Upper Iowa	Dacotah Bank Stadium; Aberdeen, SD	W 30–0	4,237
September 10	at Wayne State (NE)	Bob Cunningham Field; Wayne, NE	L 6–13	1,649
September 17	No. 24 Minnesota State	Dacotah Bank Stadium; Aberdeen, SD	W 23–22	5,378
September 24	at No. 13 Augustana (SD)	Kirkeby-Over Stadium; Sioux Falls, SD	L 13–21	3,519
October 1	at Mary	MDU Resources Community Bowl; Bismarck, ND	L 26–27	1,922
October 8	Winona State	Dacotah Bank Stadium; Aberdeen, SD	W 42–21	7,064
October 15	at Minot State	Herb Parker Stadium; Minot, ND	W 38–10	1,845
October 22	Concordia–St. Paul	Dacotah Bank Stadium; Aberdeen, SD	W 49–20	4,221
October 29	Minnesota State–Moorhead	Dacotah Bank Stadium; Aberdeen, SD	W 35–7	4,195
November 5	at Bemidji State	Chet Anderson Stadium; Bemidji, MN	L 14–24	957
November 12	Minnesota–Duluth	Dacotah Bank Stadium; Aberdeen, SD	L 7-28	2,593
Rankings from AFCA Poll released prior to the game
