= Northern Sun men's basketball tournament =

- Conference basketball championship
- Sport: Basketball
- Conference: Northern Sun Intercollegiate Conference
- Number of teams: 8
- Format: Single-elimination tournament
- Current stadium: Sanford Pentagon
- Current location: Sioux Falls, SD
- Played: 2000–present
- Current champion: Minnesota–Duluth (3rd)
- Most championships: Northern State (SD) (6)
- Official website: NSIC Men's Basketball

Host stadiums
- Sanford Pentagon (2014–present); Taylor Arena (2012–2013); Gangelhoff Center (2000–2004, 2011); Halenbeck Hall (2010); McCown Gymnasium (2005–2009)

Host locations
- Sioux Falls, SD (2014–present); Rochester, MN (2012–2013); St. Paul, MN (2000–2004, 2011); St. Cloud, MN (2010); Winona, MN (2005–2009)

The Northern Sun Intercollegiate Conference men's basketball tournament is the annual men's conference basketball championship tournament for the Northern Sun Intercollegiate Conference. The tournament has been held annually since 2000. It is a single-elimination tournament and seeding is based on regular season records.

The winner receives the conference's automatic bid to the NCAA Men's Division II Basketball Championship.

== Tournament format ==
Between its establishment in 2000 and 2012, the tournament featured only the top 8 teams from the conference, with all eight teams active from the quarterfinal round.

After 2013, however, the tournament expanded to 16 teams, with teams seeded based on their performance in either the North or South Division of the Northern Sun. The first round, which features all sixteen teams, pairs the top-seeded teams from the North and South Divisions against the eighth-seeded team from the opposite division. In turn, the second-seeded team from each of these teams' brackets comes from the opposite division (i.e. the top-seeded team from the North would ideally oppose the second-seeded team from the South and vice versa for the other division's top team). This pattern continues for the third- and fourth-seeded teams.

In all instances of the tournament, the semifinal and final rounds have been played at a pre-determined venue, which has also hosted the quarterfinal round since 2012. From 2000 to 2011, these sites were the on-campus gymnasium of Northern Sun teams. Since 2012, however, these have been neutral-site arenas not home to any Northern Sun programs.

== Results ==
Year	Champions	Score	Runner-up	MVP	Venue
2000	Wayne State (NE)	72–60	Minnesota–Duluth	Brad Joens, Wayne State	Gangelhoff Center (St. Paul, MN)
2001	Winona State	94–78	Southwest State	Kyle Schlaak, Winona State	Gangelhoff Center (St. Paul, MN)
2002	Minnesota–Duluth	59–57	Southwest State	Jason Schneeweis, Minnesota–Duluth	Gangelhoff Center (St. Paul, MN)
2003	Minnesota–Duluth	71–66	Minnesota State–Moorhead	Dusty Decker, Minnesota–Duluth	Gangelhoff Center (St. Paul, MN)
2004	Northern State (SD)	63–58	Minnesota–Duluth	Steve Smiley, Northern State	Gangelhoff Center (St. Paul, MN)
2005	Northern State (SD)	73–69	Winona State	Matt Hammer, Northern State	McCown Gymnasium (Winona, MN)
2006	Winona State	93–80	Northern State (SD)	David Zellman, Winona State	McCown Gymnasium (Winona, MN)
2007	Winona State	80–70	Southwest Minnesota State	John Smith, Winona State	McCown Gymnasium (Winona, MN)
2008	Winona State	73–40	Northern State (SD)	John Smith, Winona State	McCown Gymnasium (Winona, MN)
2009	St. Cloud State	91–89	Minnesota State	Taylor Witt, St. Cloud State	McCown Gymnasium (Winona, MN)
2010	St. Cloud State	68–67	Southwest Minnesota State	Matt Schneck, St. Cloud State	Halenbeck Hall (St. Cloud, MN)
2011	Winona State	58–41	St. Cloud State	Ben Fischer, Winona State	Gangelhoff Center (St. Paul, MN)
2012	Southwest Minnesota State	76–72	Minnesota State–Moorhead	Lavione West, Southwest Minnesota State	Taylor Arena (Rochester, MN)
2013	Minnesota State	73–68	Bemidji State	Jarvis Williams, Minnesota State	Taylor Arena (Rochester, MN)
2014	Minnesota State	75–66	Winona State	Zach Monaghan, Minnesota State	Sanford Pentagon (Sioux Falls, SD)
2015	Augustana (SD)	98–82	Minnesota State–Moorhead	Casey Schilling, Augustana	Sanford Pentagon (Sioux Falls, SD)
2016	Augustana (SD)	89-76	Minnesota State-Moorhead	Casey Schilling, Augustana	Sanford Pentagon (Sioux Falls, SD)
2017	Southwest Minnesota State	71–58	Upper Iowa	Ryan Bruggeman, Southwest Minnesota State	Sanford Pentagon (Sioux Falls, SD)
2018	Northern State	81–75	Southwest Minnesota State	DJ Pollard, Northern State	Sanford Pentagon (Sioux Falls, SD)
2019	Northern State	72-68	Southwest Minnesota State	Ian Smith, Northern State	Sanford Pentagon (Sioux Falls, SD)
2020	Northern State	80–59	Minnesota State	Parker Fox, Northern State	Sanford Pentagon (Sioux Falls, SD)
2021	Northern State	78–57	Minnesota State–Moorhead	Mason Stark, Northern State	Sanford Pentagon (Sioux Falls, SD)
2022	Minnesota State–Moorhead	81–73	Minnesota–Duluth	Gavin Baumgartner, MSU–Moorhead	Sanford Pentagon (Sioux Falls, SD)
2023	Minnesota State–Moorhead	79–69	Minnesota–Duluth	Jacob Beeninga, MSU–Moorhead	Sanford Pentagon (Sioux Falls, SD)
2024	Minnesota State	97–77	Minnesota–Duluth	Malik Willingham, Minnesota State	Sanford Pentagon (Sioux Falls, SD)
2025	Minnesota State–Moorhead	78–66	Minot State	Carson Johnson, MSU–Moorhead	Sanford Pentagon (Sioux Falls, SD)
2026	Minnesota–Duluth	76–65	St. Cloud State	Caleb Siwek, Minnesota–Duluth	Sanford Pentagon (Sioux Falls, SD)

== Championship appearances by school ==
School	Finals Record	Finals Appearances	Years
Northern State (SD)	6–2	8	2004, 2005, 2018, 2019, 2020, 2021
Winona State	5–2	7	2001, 2006, 2007, 2008, 2011
Minnesota State–Moorhead	3–5	8	2022, 2023, 2025
Minnesota State	3–2	5	2013, 2014, 2024
Minnesota–Duluth	3–5	8	2002, 2003, 2026
Southwest Minnesota State	2–6	8	2012, 2017
St. Cloud State	2–2	4	2009, 2010
Augustana (SD)	2–0	2	2015, 2016
Wayne State (NE)	1–0	1	2000
Minot State	0–1	1	
Upper Iowa	0–1	1	
Bemidji State	0–1	1	

- Concordia–St. Paul, Mary (ND), Minnesota–Crookston, and Sioux Falls have yet to reach the NSIC tournament final.
- Minnesota–Morris never reached the finals of the NSIC tournament before departing the conference.
