= Mike Leaf =

American college basketball coach (1961–2019)

Biographical details
- Born: June 7, 1961
- Died: August 19, 2019 (aged 58)
- Education: Saint Mary's (MN); Winona State

Coaching career (HC unless noted)
- 1987–1998: Winona State (assistant)
- 1998–2015: Winona State

Head coaching record
- Overall: 382–152

Accomplishments and honors

Championships
- 2 NCAA Division II tournament (2006, 2008); 6 NSIC regular season (1999, 2000, 2005–2008); 5 NSIC tournament (2001, 2006–2008, 2011)

Awards
- 2× NABC Division II National Coach of the Year (2006, 2008); 5× NSIC Coach of the Year (2000, 2005–2008)

Michael P. Leaf (June 7, 1961 – August 19, 2019) was an American college basketball coach. He is known for his tenure as head coach at Winona State University, where he won two NCAA Division II National titles.

Leaf attended Cotter High School in Winona, Minnesota, graduating in 1979. He went on to obtain his undergraduate degree from Saint Mary's University of Minnesota, where he played two years of basketball and tennis. He became a high school tennis coach at his alma mater before accepting a role as an assistant basketball coach at Winona State prior to the 1987–88 season. He spent 11 seasons as an assistant for Jerry Nauman and Les Wothke and was named head coach when Wothke resigned in 1998.

Leaf was the head coach at Winona State for 17 seasons. During his time, he led the Warriors to a 382–152 record, becoming the school's winningest coach. During a three-year stretch from 2005 to 2008, Leaf's Warriors won two NCAA Division II championships (2006 and 2008) and went 105–6. In the 2007–08 season, behind NABC National Player of the Year John Smith, the Warriors went 38–1 to set a Division II single-season win record. Additionally, the team won 57 consecutive games from 2006 to 2007. He resigned as head coach during the 2015 offseason following an accusation that he made a sexual advance on a player.

Leaf died on August 19, 2019.
