= 2006 NCAA Division II men's basketball tournament =

- Teams: 64
- Finals site: MassMutual Center, Springfield, Massachusetts
- Champions: Winona State Warriors (1st title)
- Runner-up: Virginia Union Panthers (4th title game)
- Semifinalists: Seattle Pacific Falcons (2nd Final Four); Stonehill SkyHawks (1st Final Four)
- Winning coach: Mike Leaf (1st title)
- MOP: John Smith (Winona State)
- Attendance: 32,938

The 2006 NCAA Division II men's basketball tournament involved 64 schools playing in a single-elimination tournament to determine the national champion of men's NCAA Division II college basketball as the culmination of the 2004–05 NCAA Division II men's basketball season. It was won by Winona State University and WSU's John Smith was the Most Outstanding Player.

2006 NCAA Division II Men's sites - regionals (cyan) Elite Eight (red)

== Regionals ==
=== South - Cleveland, Mississippi ===
Location: Walter Sillers Coliseum Host: Delta State University

First round Round of 64; March 11
1	Delta State	76
8	Stillman	70
4	Arkansas–Monticello	90
5	North Alabama	81
6	Rollins	63
3	Alabama–Huntsville	58
2	Montevallo	69
7	Benedict	59

Regional semifinal Round of 32; March 12
1	Delta State	68
4	Arkansas-Monticello	83
6	Rollins	68
2	Montevallo	81

Regional Final; Sweet 16; March 14
4	Arkansas-Monticello	86
2	Montevallo (OT)	89

=== West - Seattle, Washington ===
Location: Royal Brougham Pavilion Host: Seattle Pacific University

First round Round of 64; March 10
1	Seattle Pacific	86
8	Central Washington	76
5	Cal State Bakersfield	71
4	Sonoma State	65
3	Chaminade	84
6	Alaska–Anchorage	67
2	Western Washington	100
7	Humboldt State	86

Regional semifinal Round of 32; March 11
1	Seattle Pacific	81
5	Cal State Bakersfield	75
3	Chaminade	91
2	Western Washington	101

Regional Final; Sweet 16; March 13
1	Seattle Pacific	81
2	Western Washington	77

=== Great Lakes - Rensselaer, Indiana ===
Location: Richard F. Scharf Alumni Fieldhouse Host: St. Joseph's College

First round Round of 64; March 11
1	St. Joseph's (IN)	74
8	Ferris State	69
4	Southern Indiana	78
5	Drury	58
6	Quincy	74
3	Findlay	67
7	SIUE	65
2	Grand Valley State	61

Regional semifinal Round of 32; March 12
1	St. Joseph's (IN)	78
4	Southern Indiana	81
6	Quincy	69
7	SIUE	80

Regional Final; Sweet 16; March 14
4	Southern Indiana	60
7	SIUE (ot)	64

=== South Atlantic - Richmond, Virginia ===
Location: Barco-Stevens Hall Host: Virginia Union University

First round Round of 64; March 11
1	Virginia Union	82
8	Wingate	66
4	Columbus State (ot)	90
5	USC Upstate	88
6	Georgia College	86
3	Johnson C. Smith	68
7	Presbyterian	73
2	Armstrong Atlantic	67

Regional semifinal Round of 32; March 12
1	Virginia Union	75
4	Columbus State	69
6	Georgia College	77
7	Presbyterian	58

Regional Final; Sweet 16; March 14
1	Virginia Union	76
6	Georgia College	73

=== North Central - Winona, Minnesota ===
Location: McCown Gymnasium Host: Winona State University

First round Round of 64; March 11
1	Winona State (ot)	81
8	South Dakota	69
4	Minnesota State	82
5	Nebraska–Kearney	70
3	Northern State	72
6	Metro State	67
2	Fort Hays State	69
7	St. Cloud State	54

Regional semifinal Round of 32; March 12
1	Winona State	74
4	Minnesota State	71
3	Northern State	60
2	Fort Hays State	58

Regional Final; Sweet 16; March 14
1	Winona State	96
3	Northern State	86

=== East - Wilson, North Carolina ===
Location: Wilson Gym Host: Barton College

First round Round of 64; March 11
1	Barton	93
8	Wheeling Jesuit	70
5	Mount Olive	86
4	Shippensburg	83
3	Alderson Broaddus	64
6	Salem International	58
2	West Virginia State	103
7	Edinboro	89

Regional semifinal Round of 32; March 12
1	Barton	82
5	Mount Olive	79
3	Alderson Broaddus	88
2	West Virginia State	82

Regional Final; Sweet 16; March 14
1	Barton	73
3	Alderson Broaddus	70

=== Northeast - North Easton, Massachusetts ===
Location: Merkert Gymnasium Host: Stonehill College

First round Round of 64; March 11
1	Stonehill	96
8	Bloomfield	77
5	Adelphi	90
4	Bentley	86
6	UMass Lowell	77
3	Bryant	67
2	St. Anselm	83
7	Bridgeport	63

Regional semifinal Round of 32; March 12
1	Stonehill	69
5	Adelphi	54
6	UMass Lowell	74
2	St. Anselm	70

Regional Final; Sweet 16; March 14
1	Stonehill	89
6	UMass Lowell	80

=== South Central - Bolivar, Missouri ===
Location: Meyer Wellness & Sports Center Host: Southwest Baptist University

First round Round of 64; March 11
1	Southwest Baptist	75
8	St. Edward's	70
5	Northwest Missouri State	66
4	West Texas A&M	51
3	Central Missouri (ot)	67
6	Truman State	63
2	Tarleton State	75
7	Central Oklahoma	68

Regional semifinal Round of 32; March 12
1	Southwest Baptist	80
5	Northwest Missouri State	83
3	Central Missouri	59
2	Tarleton State	62

Regional Final; Sweet 16; March 14
5	Northwest Missouri State	71
2	Tarleton State	72

== Elite Eight–Springfield, Massachusetts ==
Location: MassMutual Center Hosts: American International College and Naismith Memorial Basketball Hall of Fame

National Quarterfinals; Elite Eight; March 22
Seattle Pacific	79
Montevallo	65
Virginia Union	60
SIUE	58
Winona State (ot)	85
Barton	78
Stonehill	69
Tarleton State	59

National semifinals Final Four; March 23
Seattle Pacific	63
Virginia Union	68
Winona State	83
Stonehill	73

National Championship; March 25
Virginia Union	61
Winona State	73

== All-tournament team ==
- Tony Binetti (Seattle Pacific)
- Brad Byerson (Virginia Union)
- Darius Hargrove (Virginia Union)
- John Smith (Winona State)
- David Zellmann (Winona State)
