= Mike Schmidt (American football) =

American football coach (born 1985)

Michael Schmidt
Current position
- Title: Head coach
- Team: Northern State
- Conference: NSIC
- Record: 39–27

Biographical details
- Born: c. 1985 (age 40–41); Menomonie, Wisconsin, U.S.
- Education: University of Wisconsin–La Crosse (2008)

Playing career

Football
- 2004–2007: Wisconsin–La Crosse

Baseball
- 2005–2008: Wisconsin–La Crosse
- Positions: Running back (football); First baseman, designated hitter (baseball)

Coaching career (HC unless noted)

Football
- 2008: Minnesota State (GA)
- 2009: Dubuque (DB)
- 2010: Dubuque (OL)
- 2011–2014: Dubuque (DC/LB/DB)
- 2015: Wisconsin–Platteville (DC)
- 2016–2019: Wisconsin–La Crosse
- 2020–present: Northern State

Head coaching record
- Overall: 66–40

Accomplishments and honors

Championships
- NSIC North Division (2026)

Awards
- AFCA Division III Assistant Coach of the Year (2013)

Michael Schmidt (born c. 1985) is an American college football coach. He is the head football coach for Northern State University, a position he has held since 2020. Schmidt was the head coach for the Wisconsin–La Crosse Eagles football team from 2016 to 2019. He also coached for Minnesota State and Dubuque. He played college football for Wisconsin–La Crosse as a running back.

== Head coaching record ==
Year	Team	Overall	Conference	Standing	Bowl/playoffs	D3^{#}
Wisconsin–La Crosse Eagles (Wisconsin Intercollegiate Athletic Conference) (2016–2019)
2016	Wisconsin–La Crosse	5–5	2–5	6th		
2017	Wisconsin–La Crosse	8–2	5–2	3rd		24
2018	Wisconsin–La Crosse	7–3	5–2	2nd		
2019	Wisconsin–La Crosse	7–3	5–2	3rd		
Wisconsin–La Crosse:		27–13	17–11			
Northern State Wolves (Northern Sun Intercollegiate Conference) (2020–present)
2020–21	No team—COVID-19					
2021	Northern State	7–4	7–4 / 3–3	T–5th / 3rd (North)		
2022	Northern State	6–5	6–5 / 3–3	8th / 3rd (North)		
2023	Northern State	5–6	4–6	8th		
2024	Northern State	6–5	6–4	T–5th		
2025	Northern State	7–4	6–4 / 4–2	T–6th / T–2nd (North)		
2026	Northern State	8–3	7–3 / 5–1	T–3rd / T–1st (North)		
Northern State:		39–27	36–26			
Total:		66–40				
