= Concordia-Minnesota =

Concordia-Minnesota may refer to:

- Concordia University (Saint Paul, Minnesota)
- Concordia College (Moorhead, Minnesota)
