= Kev Koom Siab =

Kev Koom Siab ([kě.kõ̰.ʂiə́], Path to Unity) is an American Hmong-language television series, which was the first Hmong-language public affairs television program on US television. The series was produced at Twin Cities Public Television and Saint Paul Neighborhood Network from 1992 to 2003. The programs are currently stored for historical and cultural reference at the Hmong Archives at Concordia University, Saint Paul, in Saint Paul, Minnesota.
