= John Smith (basketball, born 1984) =

American basketball player

Personal information
- Born: August 20, 1984 (age 42)
- Listed height: 6 ft 8 in (2.03 m)
- Listed weight: 235 lb (107 kg)

Career information
- High school: Johnsburg (Johnsburg, Illinois)
- College: Winona State (2004–2008)
- NBA draft: 2008: undrafted
- Playing career: 2008–2011
- Position: Power forward / center

Career history
- 2009: Vermont Frost Heaves
- 2009–2010: Vagos Norbain Lusavouga
- 2010: EiffelTowers Den Bosch
- 2010–2011: WBC Raiffeisen Wels

Career highlights
- 2× NCAA Division II champion (2006, 2008); 2× NABC Division II Player of the Year (2007, 2008); 2× First-team Division II All-American (2007, 2008); 2× NSIC Player of the Year (2007, 2008); 3× First-team All-NSIC (2006–2008); 2× NSIC tournament MVP (2007, 2008)

John David Smith (born August 20, 1984) is an American former basketball player, best known for his decorated college career at Winona State University, where he was twice named Division II National Player of the Year.

== College career ==
Smith came to Winona State from Johnsburg High School in Johnsburg, Illinois. After redshirting a season to gain weight for college play, he joined the Warriors' 2004–05 team. He took over as the team's center that season, then became a first-team All-Northern Sun Intercollegiate Conference (NSIC) pick as a sophomore. The Warriors won the NCAA Division II title that season behind the leadership of Smith and teammate Jonte Flowers. In his junior year, Smith averaged 16.8 points and 9.8 rebounds as the Warriors went undefeated for the season before losing the 2007 NCAA championship game to Barton College. At the close of the season, Smith was honored as a first-team All-American and the National Player of the Year by the National Association of Basketball Coaches (NABC).

As a senior, Smith and Flowers returned to lead the Warriors to a second national championship, this time beating Augusta State University. Smith maintained his play, averaging 17.5 points and 8.4 rebounds per game, winning his second straight NSIC and NABC National Player of the Year award. Smith left Winona State as the school's leading scorer (2,265 career points) and broke or tied several other school offensive records. In 2019, he was inducted into the Small College Basketball Hall of Fame.

== Professional career ==
Following the close of his college career, Smith signed with the Iowa Energy of the NBA Development League (now the NBA G League). After being injured prior to playing for the team, he played for the Vermont Frost Heaves of the Premier Basketball League. He then signed with Vagos Norbain Lusavouga in Portugal, averaging 17.9 points, 9.6 rebounds and 1.8 blocks per game, earning league MVP and Defensive Player of the year honors. For the 2010–11 season, Smith split time between EiffelTowers Den Bosch in the Netherlands and WBC Raiffeisen Wels in Austria.

== Post-playing career ==
In 2011, Smith returned to the United States to start a coaching career. After two seasons as a high school coach, he joined his alma mater and former coach Mike Leaf as a graduate assistant in 2014. He left the post in 2015.
