= Roncalli High School (South Dakota) =

Private coeducational school in Aberdeen, South Dakota, United States

- Roncalli

Location
- 1400 North Dakota Street; Aberdeen, South Dakota, (Brown County) 57401; United States; 45°28′46″N 98°28′23″W

Information
- Type: Private, Coeducational
- Motto: "Instilling Catholic values and promoting academic excellence by nurturing mind, body and soul"
- Religious affiliation: Roman Catholic
- Established: 1964
- President: Tim Weisz
- Principal: Paula Florey
- Grades: 9–12
- Gender: All Genders
- Hours in school day: 8–3
- Colors: Green and gold
- Athletics conference: Northeast Conference
- Mascot: Cavalier
- Team name: Cavaliers
- Rival: Groton Tigers
- Accreditation: North Central Association of Colleges and Schools
- Newspaper: Cavalcade
- Yearbook: Lance
- Website: aberdeenroncalli.org

Roncalli High School is a private, Roman Catholic high school in Aberdeen, South Dakota. It is located in the Roman Catholic Diocese of Sioux Falls.

== Background ==
Roncalli High School is named after Pope John XXIII, born Angelo Giuseppe Roncalli.

== Athletics ==
Roncalli is a member of the South Dakota High School Activities Association. They have won the following SDHSAA State Championships:

- Boys Football - 2005, 2006 (Runner-Up - 1987)
- Boys Basketball - 1975, 2015
- Boys Tennis - none (Runner-Up - 1977)
- Boys Golf - 2004, 2015, 2017 (Runner-up - 2002, 2007)
- Boys Track and Field - 2006
- Girls Basketball - 2021
- Girls Volleyball - 2002
- Girls Track and Field - none (Runner-Up - 2005)

Dacotah Bank Stadium is the home venue for all Roncalli football games.
