= Fire SC 98 =

American women's soccer club

Fire 98 SC
- Full name: Fire SC 98
- Nickname: Fire
- Founded: February 6, 2018
- Ground: Sea Foam Stadium
- Capacity: 3,500
- Owner: Fire SC
- Chairman: Aaron Tilsen
- Coach: Mickey McNeill, Aaron Tilsen
- League: Women's Premier Soccer League
- Website: https://www.firesc98.com/

Fire 98 SC is an American women's soccer club based in Saint Paul, Minnesota. It participates in the WPSL, and was awarded an expansion franchise on February 6, 2018. The club's coaches are Mickey McNeill and Aaron Tilsen.

== Current squad ==
Note: Flags indicate national team as defined under FIFA eligibility rules; some limited exceptions apply. Players may hold more than one non-FIFA nationality. Squad correct as of February 6, 2018.

No.	Pos.	Nation	Player
0	GK	USA	Olivia Elvidge
0	GK	USA	Julia Clifford
1	GK	USA	Ashley Becker
2	DF	USA	Makenzie Langdok
3	MF	USA	Alyssa Regalado
5	FW	USA	Aleksa Tataryn
6	FW	USA	Mckenzie Buck
7	MF	USA	Molly Fielder
8	DF	USA	Kaylyn Billmeyer
9	FW	USA	Mimi Eiden
10	MF	USA	Emily Heslin
11	FW	USA	Mariah Northrop
12	DF	USA	Amanda Carey
13	DF	USA	Erika Hjort
14	MF	USA	Maddie Frick
15	DF	USA	Ashley Ebeling
16	MF	USA	Maria Retting
17	MF	USA	Mollie Monson
18	MF	USA	Anna Porch
19	MF	USA	Carly Goehring
20	FW	USA	Claire Radatz
21	MF	USA	Andrea Eliason
22	GK	USA	Emily Nelson
23	MF	USA	Emily Skogseth
24	MF	USA	Maddy Griess
25	DF	USA	Sierra Smith
26	MF	USA	Jamie Intihar
27	FW	USA	Taylor Bare
28	MF	USA	Roxy Roemer
29	FW	USA	Morgan Turner
30	FW	USA	McKenna Buisman
31	DF	USA	Hanna Norman
32	MF	FRA	Elodie Halgand

== Current staff ==
As of February 2018

Staff
Co-head coach and general manager	Aaron Tilsen
Co-head coach and assistant general manager	Mickey McNeill
Marketing director	Adam Peterson
Operations director	Brandon Stevenson
