= 2010 North Sun Intercollegiate Conference men's basketball tournament =

- Sport: College basketball
- No. of teams: 8
- Country: United States
- Most recent champion: St. Cloud State

The Northern Sun men's basketball tournament in 2010 was won by the team representing St. Cloud State University.

== Bracket ==
The tournament took place March 3 and March 7.

Quarter Finals
1	Minnesota State	78
8	SW Minnesota St.	80
4	Winona State	76
5	University of Mary	57
2	St Cloud State	76
7	Concordia-St. Paul	61
3	Augustana	52
6	Wayne State	75

Semifinals
8	SW Minnesota St.	81
4	Winona State	67
2	St. Cloud State	74
6	Wayne State	66

Championship
8	SW Minnesota St.	67
2	St. Cloud State	68

== First round ==
=== (1) Minnesota State vs. (8) SW Minnesota St. ===
March 3

Minnesota State 78, SW Minnesota State 80

Mankato, MN

=== (4) Winona State vs. (5) University of Mary ===
March 3

Winona State 76, University of Mary 57

Winona, MN

=== (2) St. Cloud State vs. (5) Concordia-St. Paul ===
March 3

St. Cloud State 76, Concordia-St. Paul 61

St. Cloud, MN

=== (3) Augustana vs. (5) Wayne State ===
March 3

Augustana 52, Wayne State 75

Sioux Falls, SD

== Semifinals ==
=== (8) SW Minnesota State vs. (4) Winona State ===
March 6

SW Minnesota State 81, Winona State 67

St. Cloud, MN

=== (2) St. Cloud State vs. (6) Wayne State ===
March 6

St. Cloud State 74, Wayne State 66

St. Cloud, MN

== Championship ==
=== (8) SW Minnesota State vs. (2) St. Cloud State ===
March 7

SW Minnesota State 67, St. Cloud State 68

St. Cloud, MN
