= Eric Dregni =

American author

- Education: Macalester College; University of Minnesota
- Occupations: Associate Professor of English and Journalism at Concordia University St. Paul; Advisor of Student Newspaper, at Concordia University St. Paul; Author
- Employer: Concordia University St. Paul

Eric Dregni is an American author. He is an associate professor of English and Journalism at Concordia University in Saint Paul, Minnesota, where he teaches writing. He has written or cowritten travel memoirs and essays about Minnesota, Norway, and Italy, as well as guidebooks and books on popular culture in the American Midwest.

== Childhood and personal life ==
Dregni lives with his wife, Katy, and three children in the Longfellow neighborhood of Minneapolis. His family lived in Belgium when he was a child, and traveled in Britain and Northern Europe before they settled in Minnetonka.

In the 1990s he played in the amateur novelty band Vinnie and the Stardüsters. Dregni founded the band with John Perkins. The two met as teenagers on a junior high school church trip but formed the band as undergraduates at Macalester College. Dregni, a music major, graduated in 1990.

== Career ==
A MinnPost profile characterized Dregni's writing career as suggestive of a man on "an endless (and sometimes endlessly weird) vacation." He has written several guidebooks to the American Midwest, the product of a series of road trips. His book In Cod We Trust came out of a Fulbright Fellowship that funded Dregni to spend 2003 in Norway with his wife and their newborn son. Never Trust a Thin Cook was written after a series of extended visits to Italy, culminating in a yearlong residence in Modena in the 1990s.

== Bibliography ==
=== As author ===
- Zamboni: The Coolest Machines on Ice
- Scooter Mania(1996)
- Let's Go Bowling!
- Scooters: Everything You Need to Know
- Vikings in the Attic; In search of Nordic America. (University of Minnesota Press University of Minnesota Press, 2011).
- In Cod We Trust. Minneapolis.
- Midwest Marvels. Minneapolis.
- Minnesota Marvels. Minneapolis.
- Never Trust a Thin Cook and Other Lessons from Italy's Culinary Capital.
- By the Waters of Minnetonka. Minneapolis.
- Let's Go Fishing! Fish Tales from the North Woods (2016. University of Minnesota Press)
- You're Sending Me Where? Dispatches from Summer Camp (2017. University of Minnesota Press)
- For the Love of Cod. A Father and Son’s Search for Norwegian Happiness (2021. University of Minnesota Press)

=== As co-author ===
- Weird Minnesota (Weird)
- Scooter Bible: From Cushman to Vespa, the Ultimate History and Buyer's Guide
- Ads That Put America on Wheels
- Illustrated Motorscooter Buyer's Guide (Illustrated Buyer's Guide)
- Follies of Science: 20th Century Visions of Our Fantastic Future
