= Gangelhoff Center =

Multi-purpose arena in Saint Paul, Minnesota

Coordinates: 44°56′52.87″N 93°9′28.38″W

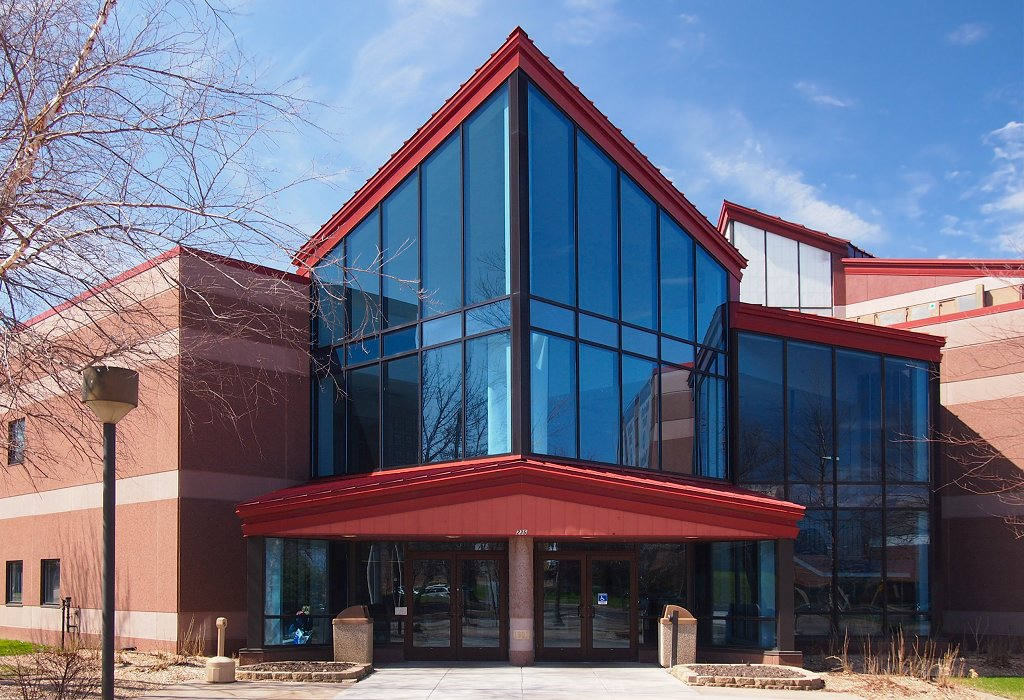
The Gangelhoff Center's main entrance

Gangelhoff Center is a 3,200-seat multi-purpose arena on the campus of Concordia University in Saint Paul, Minnesota that opened in 1993. It is the home to Concordia University Golden Bears volleyball and basketball teams and was home to the Minnesota Ripknees during their one season in the American Basketball Association. It also serves as the indoor home to Concordia University Golden Bears track & field, featuring a 200-meter track with a 4-lane oval and 6-lane straightaway, separate runways for horizontal jumps and pole vault, an integrated throws ring, and space for high jump. Several of Concordia's athletic teams practice here when the weather is inclement. In addition, intramural volleyball and basketball is also played here. The facility's surface is Mondo Super X. The 70,000 square foot Gangelhoff Center is named after benefactors Ronald and Doris Gangelhoff.

== History ==
The Gangelhoff Center is one of the busiest venues in the Twin Cities. Gangelhoff has 1,200 permanent seats but can expand its capacity to handle 4,000 fans for an event. One of those times was in March 2001 when Concordia hosted the Slam Dunk/Three Point competition that was televised nationally by ESPN, with a capacity crowd watching from the stands.

In December 2008, the Gangelhoff Center hosted the 2008 NCAA Division II Women's Volleyball Championships. The Tournament featured eight teams including host and defending National Champion Concordia University Saint Paul. The tournament was won in dramatic fashion as the #1 Concordia University Golden Bears beat #2 Cal State San Bernardino 3–2.

The Gangelhoff Center has served as the venue of several NCAA Regional tournaments and the semifinals and finals of the NSIC basketball and volleyball tournaments over the last three years.

In addition to college volleyball and basketball, the Gangelhoff has hosted high school basketball regular season and sectional games, the Minnesota State High School Badminton Tournament, concerts, and school graduation ceremonies.
