= Sea Foam Stadium =

University stadium in Minnesota, US

Coordinates: 44.9504°N 93.158°W

- Location in Minnesota Location in the United States
- Address: 281 Hamline Ave. N
- Location: Saint Paul, Minnesota
- Owner: Concordia University, Saint Paul
- Operator: Concordia University, Saint Paul
- Capacity: 3,500
- Surface: Field: Sprinturf (artificial); Track: Beynon 10mm full pour

Construction
- Opened: 2009
- Cost: Initial: $8 million ($12 million in 2025 dollars); Projected final: $14.5 million ($21.8 million in 2025 dollars)

Tenants
- Concordia Golden Bears football, women's soccer, men's & women's track & field (2009–); Fire SC 98 (WPSL); Minnesota Wind Chill (UFA) (2019-) Minnesota Vixen (WFA)

Sea Foam Stadium is the football field on the campus of Concordia University, Saint Paul in Saint Paul, Minnesota. It opened in 2009, and seats about 3,500 spectators. The stadium includes a football/soccer field with artificial turf, running track, scoreboard, lights, bleachers, parking, concession facilities, locker rooms, weight room, press box, outdoor plaza, and inflatable dome, somewhat resembling a marshmallow, during the winter months. As of August 2023, the stadium has a Daktronics videoboard and speaker on the north end-zone.

The stadium cost a total of $14.5 million to construct and is named so because of a $5 million donation by Sea Foam Sales Company.

The stadium also hosts the Ultimate Frisbee Association's (UFA) Minnesota Wind Chill, who have been playing their home games at Sea Foam since 2019. Most noticeably, it was the location of the Central Division Championship game of the 2024 (UFA) season, where the Wind Chill defeated the Madison Radicals 23-14, eventually leading that season to win the UFA Championship.
