= Concordia University, St. Paul =

Private Lutheran university in St. Paul, Minnesota

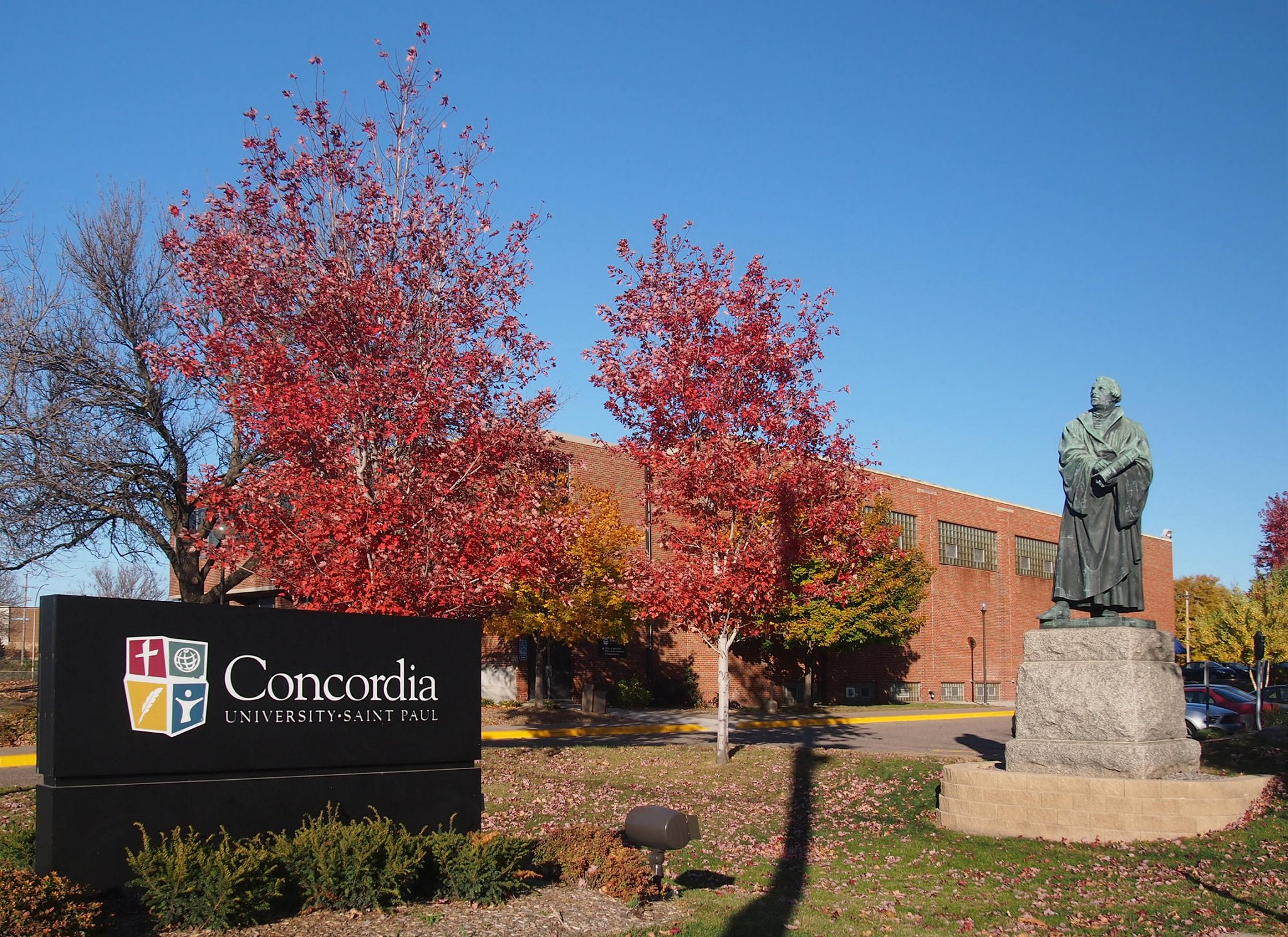
- Entrance to Concordia University
- Former names: Concordia High School (1893–1921); Concordia College (1921–1997)
- Motto: "In litteris proficere volo, malo diligere Jesum" "It is good to pursue knowledge, better to know Jesus"
- Type: Private university
- Established: 1893; 133 years ago
- Religious affiliation: Lutheran Church–Missouri Synod
- Endowment: $70.1 million (2025)
- President: Brian Friedrich
- Students: 5,861 (2023)
- Location: Saint Paul, Minnesota, United States; 44°56′59″N 93°9′18″W
- Campus: Urban, 41 acres (17 ha)
- Colors: Navy & Gold
- Mascot: Golden Bears
- Website: csp.edu
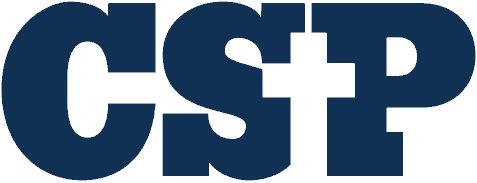

Concordia University, St. Paul is a private Lutheran university in Saint Paul, Minnesota, United States. It was founded in 1893 and enrolls nearly 5,900 students. It is a member of the Concordia University System, which is operated by the second-largest Lutheran church body in the United States, the Lutheran Church – Missouri Synod (LCMS). The school was a two-year college until 1964. The name Concordia University, St. Paul was adopted in 1997.

== Academics ==
CSP offers undergraduate majors and minors, graduate programs, adult undergraduate degree programs, continuing education classes and certificates, and licensure and colloquy programs. Many of these programs are also offered in an online degree format through the school's online campus. The school oversees students in Portland, Oregon, enrolled in the Accelerated Bachelor of Science in Nursing program, which was absorbed in 2020 after Concordia University, Portland closed. In 2023 CSP announced the creation of CSP Global, an online branch dedicated to serving traditional and non-traditional students. Forty undergraduate and graduate programs are offered through CSP Global.

Concordia University is accredited by (among others) the Higher Learning Commission. Concordia University, St. Paul has been accredited since 1967.

In fall 2023, CSP enrolled 5,861 students, of whom 1,743 were on the St. Paul campus.

Notable faculty include writer Eric Dregni and theologian Reed Lessing.

== Rankings ==
In 2024, Concordia University, St. Paul was ranked No. 92 in Regional Universities, Midwest by U.S. News & World Report.

== Athletics ==
CSP athletic teams are the Golden Bears. The university is a member of the Division II level of the National Collegiate Athletic Association (NCAA), primarily competing in the Northern Sun Intercollegiate Conference (NSIC) since the 1999–2000 academic year.

The university competes in 19 intercollegiate varsity sports: Men's sports include baseball, basketball, cross country, football, golf and track & field; while women's sports include basketball, cheerleading, cross country, dance, golf, lacrosse, soccer, softball, swimming & diving, track & field and volleyball; and co-ed sports include Esports.

Concordia, St. Paul's volleyball team has won 9 NCAA Division II National Championships including seven straight from 2007 to 2013, adding two more in 2016 and 2017.

=== Facilities ===
The Sea Foam Stadium is home to the football team and to women's soccer, women's lacrosse, and track & field. It is also the location for the Concordia Dome.

Concordia's baseball team plays at Barnes Field, and the softball team plays at Carlander Field. Two Rivers Aquatic Center in Mendota Heights hosts the woman's swimming and diving team.

The Gangelhoff Center is the home venue for the university's basketball and volleyball teams, as well as several other sports..

== Notable alumni ==
- Marty Lang (1905-1968), Major League Baseball pitcher
- Zach Moore (born 1990), National Football League defensive end
- Nuni Omot (born 1994), basketball player in the Israeli Basketball Premier League
- Connie Ruth (born 1944), politician
- Gus Varland (born 1996), Major League Baseball pitcher

== See also ==
- List of colleges and universities in Minnesota
- Higher education in Minnesota
