= Northern Sun Intercollegiate Conference =

NCAA Division II athletic conference

- Formerly: Northern Teachers Athletic Conference (1932–1942); State Teacher's College Conference of Minnesota (1942–1962); Northern Intercollegiate Conference (1962–1992); Northern Sun Conference (women's, 1979–1992)
- Association: NCAA
- Founded: 1932; 94 years ago
- Commissioner: Erin Lind (since July 1, 2014)
- Sports fielded: 18; men's: 8; women's: 10
- Division: Division II
- No. of teams: 16
- Headquarters: Saint Paul, Minnesota
- Region: West North Central States
- Website: northernsun.org

Locations

The Northern Sun Intercollegiate Conference (NSIC) is a college athletic conference affiliated with the National Collegiate Athletic Association (NCAA) at the Division II level, which operates in the Upper Midwest of the United States. Nine of its members are in Minnesota, with three members in South Dakota, three members in North Dakota, and one member in Nebraska. It was founded in 1932. With the recent NSIC expansion, the original six member schools have been reunited.

The conference sponsors 18 sports; ten for women and eight for men. Both men and women compete in basketball, cross country, golf, and indoor and outdoor track and field. Men compete in baseball, football, and wrestling. Women compete in soccer, softball, swimming & diving, tennis, and volleyball. The NSIC is the only Division II conference that sponsors soccer for women but not men (two other D-II conferences do not sponsor soccer for either sex).

== History ==
Northern Sun Intercollegiate Conference
Location of NSIC members: full . Not shown: men's wrestling associate UW-Parkside.

The Northern Sun Intercollegiate Conference was founded in 1932 as the Northern Teachers Athletic Conference. Charter members included Bemidji State Teachers College (Bemidji State University), Duluth State Teachers College (University of Minnesota Duluth), Mankato State Teachers College (Minnesota State University), Moorhead State Teachers College (Minnesota State University Moorhead), St. Cloud State Teachers College (St. Cloud State University), and Winona State Teachers College (Winona State University). In 1942 the conference name was changed to the State Teacher's College Conference of Minnesota. The conference switched its name to the Northern Intercollegiate Conference (NIC) in 1962. In the spring of 1992 the NSIC was formed out of the merger of the NIC, the men's conference, and the women's Northern Sun Conference (NSC).

In 1992, the NSIC joined NCAA Division II after being long time members of the National Association of Intercollegiate Athletics (NAIA).

In the 1998–99 academic year, the NSIC became an expanded eight-team league from a previous seven-member conference by adding Wayne State College, and in 1999–2000 became a 10-member conference by adding Concordia University, St. Paul, and the University of Minnesota Crookston. The conference existed as an eight-member league from 2004–05 until 2005–06 with the departure of Minnesota–Duluth to the now defunct North Central Conference, and the University of Minnesota Morris to NCAA Division III. The University of Mary and Upper Iowa University were admitted in the fall of 2006 to again expand the NSIC to 10 members.

In 2007 the NSIC Board of Directors voted to expand the conference to 14 schools. League presidents voted to accept into membership Augustana College (now Augustana University), St. Cloud State, Minnesota–Duluth, and Minnesota State. These four schools were members of the North Central Conference which disbanded after the 2007–2008 academic year. They became official members of the NSIC on July 1, 2008.

On January 20, 2010, the NSIC Board of Directors voted to expand the conference again, this time to 16 members. The league accepted into membership the University of Sioux Falls and Minot State University. Both schools moved from the NAIA, with USF leaving the Great Plains Athletic Conference, and Minot State leaving the Dakota Athletic Conference. The two schools became active members in the 2012–13 academic year.

The NSIC and its member institutions have been members of the National Association of Intercollegiate Athletics (NAIA). Mankato State won the NAIA wrestling national titles in 1958 and 1959, while Moorhead State won a wrestling national title in 1964. Forty-one wrestlers have claimed individual national titles in wrestling. Nine individuals have won national titles in Men's Swimming and Diving. Northern State claimed national titles in women's basketball in 1992 and 1994. Seven individuals have won individual titles in men's indoor track and field. Four individuals have won national titles in women's indoor track and field. Eleven athletes have won national titles in men's outdoor track and field. Six female athletes have won individual titles in outdoor track and field. Winona State won two team titles in women's gymnastics. In 1992, the NSIC entered the National Collegiate Athletic Association (NCAA). In the Fall of 1995, the NSIC and its member institutions became eligible for championship competition in the NCAA Division II ranks. The Northern Sun earned its first Division II national championship in a team sport sponsored by the conference when Winona State won the men's basketball championship in 2005–06.

Since becoming affiliated with NCAA Division II, NSIC members have won 23 team national championships and has also crowned 77 individual national champions.

=== Chronological timeline ===
Since 1932, 18 institutions have competed in the NSIC. Although all six charter members are in the conference today, only three of them have remained in the conference for the 80 years of its existence: Bemidji State, Minnesota State–Moorhead, and Winona State.

- 1932: The Northern Teacher's Athletic Conference was founded with six charter members: Bemidji State Teachers College (now Bemidji State University), Duluth State Teachers College (now the University of Minnesota Duluth), Mankato State Teachers College (now Minnesota State University, Mankato), Moorhead State Teachers College (now Minnesota State University Moorhead), St. Cloud State Teachers College (now St. Cloud State University) and Winona State Teachers College (now Winona State University).
- 1942: The conference changed its name to the State Teacher's College Conference of Minnesota.
- 1947: Duluth State Teachers College was renamed the University of Minnesota Duluth.
- 1951: Minnesota–Duluth left for the Minnesota Intercollegiate Athletic Conference (MIAC). The conference was left with five teams.
- 1957: The Michigan College of Mining and Technology (now Michigan Technological University) joined the STCCM to give the league six members. Bemidji State Teachers College was renamed Bemidji State College. Mankato State Teachers College was renamed Mankato State College. Moorhead State Teachers College becomes known as Moorhead State College. St. Cloud State Teachers College becomes St. Cloud State College and Winona State Teachers College becomes Winona State College.
- 1962: The conference changed its name to the Northern Intercollegiate Conference (NIC).
- 1964: The Michigan College of Mining and Technology renamed itself to Michigan Technological University.
- 1966: The University of Minnesota Morris joined the NIC, membership stands at seven schools.
- 1968: Mankato State left the NIC to join the North Central Conference (NCC), leaving the conference with six members.
- 1969: Southwest Minnesota State College joined the NIC as the seventh member.
- 1975: Minnesota–Duluth re-joined the NIC, giving the NIC eight teams. Bemidji State College was renamed Bemidji State University. Mankato State College was renamed Mankato State University and Moorhead State College was renamed Moorhead State University. Also, St. Cloud State College was renamed to St. Cloud State University and Winona State College was renamed to Winona State University. Southwest Minnesota State College also underwent a name change, becoming Southwest State University.
- 1978: Mankato State re-joined the NIC and Northern State College (now Northern State University) joined the league as the ninth and tenth teams, respectively.
- 1979: The Northern Sun Conference (NSC) was created for women's athletics.
- 1980: Michigan Tech left for the Great Lakes Intercollegiate Athletic Conference (GLIAC), leaving the NIC with nine teams.
- 1981: St. Cloud State and Mankato State left for the NCC. The NIC was left with seven members.
- 1989: Northern State College was renamed to Northern State University.
- 1992: The Northern Intercollegiate Conference (men's conference) and the Northern Sun Conference (women's conference) merged to form the Northern Sun Intercollegiate Conference (NSIC). The NSIC joins NCAA Division II.
- 1995: The NSIC became eligible for NCAA Division II championship competition, moving from the National Association of Intercollegiate Athletics.
- 1998: Mankato State University was renamed Minnesota State University.
- 1998: Wayne State College joined as the NSIC's eighth member.
- 1999: Concordia University, St. Paul and the University of Minnesota Crookston joined to give the NSIC 10 teams.
- 2000: Moorhead State University was renamed Minnesota State University Moorhead.
- 2003: Minnesota–Morris left the NSIC and drops down to the NCAA Division III ranks and the Upper Midwest Athletic Conference (UMAC), dropping NSIC membership to nine teams. Also, Southwest State University changed its name to Southwest Minnesota State University.
- 2004: Minnesota–Duluth left the NSIC to join the NCC, leaving the NSIC with eight schools.
- 2006: The University of Mary and Upper Iowa University joined the NSIC to bring membership back up to 10 schools.
- 2008: The North Central Conference disbanded as various members in that league make a move to NCAA Division I. Former NSIC members Minnesota–Duluth, Minnesota State, and St. Cloud State re-joined the Northern Sun. Another NCC refugee, Augustana College (now Augustana University) joined the NSIC for the first time, increasing membership to 14 schools.
- 2012: Minot State University and the University of Sioux Falls begin full membership after joining NCAA Division II from the NAIA. This gave the league its largest membership at 16 schools.
- 2012: Lindenwood University, the University of Nebraska at Kearney, Truman State University and William Jewell College, all four members of the Mid-America Intercollegiate Athletics Association (MIAA) at that time, became associate members of the NSIC in the sport of women's swimming & diving.
- 2013: Truman and William Jewell left the NSIC as associate members for women's swimming & diving to join the Great Lakes Valley Conference (GLVC) after the 2012–13 athletic season.
- 2014: Lindenwood and Nebraska–Kearney left the NSIC as associate members for women's swimming & diving to join the Rocky Mountain Athletic Conference (RMAC) after the 2013–14 athletic season.
- 2019: Minnesota–Crookston and St. Cloud State discontinued their football programs at the end of the 2019–20 academic year.
- 2020: The University of Wisconsin–Parkside (athletically branded as Parkside) joined the NSIC as an affiliate member for wrestling.
- 2023: Upper Iowa left for the Great Lakes Valley Conference (GLVC) for the 2023–24 athletic season, leaving the NSIC with 15 teams.
- 2025: The University of Jamestown joined the NSIC, bringing the membership total back to 16 schools.

== Member schools ==
=== Current members ===
The NSIC currently has 16 full members, all but five are public schools.

Institution	Location	Founded	Affiliation	Enrollment	Nickname	Joined (Note: Represents the calendar year when fall sports competition begins.)	Colors
Augustana University	Sioux Falls, South Dakota	1860	Lutheran ELCA	2,158	Vikings	2008	
Bemidji State University	Bemidji, Minnesota	1919	Public (Note: Part of the Minnesota State Colleges and Universities System.)	4,076	Beavers	1932	
Concordia University–St. Paul	Saint Paul, Minnesota	1893	Lutheran LCMS	5,928	Golden Bears	1999	
University of Jamestown	Jamestown, North Dakota	1883	Presbyterian (PCUSA)	1,372	Jimmies	2025	
University of Mary	Bismarck, North Dakota	1959	Catholic Church (Benedictines)	3,801	Marauders	2006	
Minnesota State University, Mankato	Mankato, Minnesota	1868	Public	14,709	Mavericks	1932; 1978; 2008 (Note: Minnesota State–Mankato left the NSIC after the 1967–68 school year, then rejoined from 1978–79 to 1980–81 and again since the 2008–09 school year.)	
Minnesota State University, Moorhead	Moorhead, Minnesota	1888	Public	5,547	Dragons	1932	
University of Minnesota Crookston	Crookston, Minnesota	1906	Public (Note: Part of the University of Minnesota System.)	1,729	Golden Eagles	1999	
University of Minnesota Duluth	Duluth, Minnesota	1902	Public	9,253	Bulldogs	1932; 1975; 2008 (Note: Minnesota–Duluth left the NSIC after the 1950–51 school year, then rejoined from 1975–76 to 2003–04 and again since the 2008–09 school year.)	
Minot State University	Minot, North Dakota	1913	Public (Note: Part of the North Dakota University System.)	2,751	Beavers	2012	
Northern State University	Aberdeen, South Dakota	1901	Public (Note: Part of the South Dakota Board of Regents System.)	3,711	Wolves	1978	
St. Cloud State University	St. Cloud, Minnesota	1869	Public	10,164	Huskies	1932; 2008 (Note: St. Cloud State left the NSIC after the 1980–81 school year, before rejoining since the 2008–09 school year.)	
University of Sioux Falls	Sioux Falls, South Dakota	1883	Baptist	1,624	Cougars	2012	
Southwest Minnesota State University	Marshall, Minnesota	1967	Public	7,773	Mustangs	1969	
Wayne State College	Wayne, Nebraska	1910	Public (Note: Part of the Nebraska State College System.)	4,666	Wildcats	1998	
Winona State University	Winona, Minnesota	1858	Public	6,072	Warriors	1932	

=== Affiliate members ===
The NSIC currently has one affiliate member, which is also a public school:

Institution	Location	Founded	Affiliation	Enrollment	Nickname	Joined (Note: Represents the calendar year when fall sports competition begins.)	NSIC sport	Primary conference
University of Wisconsin–Parkside	Somers, Wisconsin	1968	Public	3,947	Rangers	2020	men's wrestling	Great Lakes (GLIAC)

=== Former members ===
The NSIC had three former full members, two were public schools and one was a private school:

Institution	Location	Founded	Affiliation	Enrollment	Nickname	Joined (Note: Represents the calendar year when fall sports competition begins.)	Left (Note: Represents the calendar year when spring sports competition ends.)	Subsequent conference(s)	Current conference
Michigan Technological University	Houghton, Michigan	1885	Public	7,009	Huskies	1957	1980	Great Lakes (GLIAC) (1980–present)	
University of Minnesota Morris	Morris, Minnesota	1960	Public	1,900	Cougars	1966	2003	Upper Midwest (UMAC) (Note: Currently an NCAA Division III athletic conference.) (2003–present)	
Upper Iowa University	Fayette, Iowa	1857	Nonsectarian	3,661	Peacocks	2006	2023	Great Lakes Valley (GLVC) (2023–present)	

=== Former affiliate members ===
The NSIC had four former affiliate members, two public school and two private schools:

Institution	Location	Founded	Affiliation	Enrollment	Nickname	Joined (Note: Represents the calendar year when fall sports competition begins.)	Left (Note: Represents the calendar year when spring sports competition ends.)	NSIC sport	Primary conference
Lindenwood University	St. Charles, Missouri	1827	Presbyterian	4,822	Lady Lions	2012	2014	women's swimming & diving	Ohio Valley (OVC) (Note: Currently an NCAA Division I athletic conference.) (Note: During their time as an NSIC affiliate, Lindenwood competed as a full member of the Mid-America Intercollegiate Athletics Association (MIAA).)
University of Nebraska at Kearney	Kearney, Nebraska	1905	Public	7,504	Lopers	2012	2014	women's swimming & diving	Mid-America (MIAA)
Truman State University	Kirksville, Missouri	1867	Public	3,622	Bulldogs	2012	2013	women's swimming & diving	Great Lakes Valley (GLVC) (Note: During their time as an NSIC affiliate, Truman State competed as a full member of the Mid-America Intercollegiate Athletics Association (MIAA).)
William Jewell College	Liberty, Missouri	1849	Nonsectarian	829	Cardinals	2012	2013	women's swimming & diving	Great Lakes Valley (GLVC)

=== Membership timeline ===
Full member (all sports) Full member (non-football) Associate member (football) Associate member (sport)

== Sports ==
A divisional format is used for basketball (M / W) and football (with Concordia–St. Paul in the North as Minnesota–Crookston and St. Cloud State no longer sponsor football after the 2019 fall season).
North
- Bemidji State
- Jamestown
- Mary
- Minnesota State–Moorhead
- Minnesota–Crookston
- Minnesota–Duluth
- Minot State
- Northern State
South
- Augustana
- Concordia–St. Paul
- Minnesota State
- Sioux Falls
- Southwest Minnesota State
- St. Cloud State
- Wayne State
- Winona State

Conference sports
Sport	Men's	Women's
Baseball	✓	✗
Basketball	✓	✓
Cross Country	✓	✓
Football	✓	✗
Golf	✓	✓
Soccer	✗	✓
Softball	✗	✓
Swimming & Diving	✗	✓
Tennis	✗	✓
Track & Field Indoor	✓	✓
Track & Field Outdoor	✓	✓
Volleyball	✗	✓
Wrestling	✓	✗

=== Men's sponsored sports by school ===
School	Baseball	Basketball	Cross Country	Football	Golf	Track & Field Indoor	Track & Field Outdoor	Wrestling	Total NSIC Sports
Augustana	✓	✓	✓	✓	✓	✓	✓	✓	8
Bemidji State	✓	✓	✗	✓	✓	✗	✗	✗	4
Concordia–St. Paul	✓	✓	✓	✓	✓	✓	✓	✗	7
Jamestown	✓	✓	✓	✓	✓	✓	✓	✓	8
Mary	✓	✓	✓	✓	✗	✓	✓	✓	7
Minnesota State	✓	✓	✓	✓	✓	✓	✓	✓	8
MSU–Moorhead	✗	✓	✓	✓	✗	✓	✓	✓	6
Minnesota–Crookston	✓	✓	✓	✗	✓	✓	✓	✗	6
Minnesota–Duluth	✓	✓	✓	✓	✗	✓	✓	✗	6
Minot State	✓	✓	✓	✓	✓	✓	✓	✓	8
Northern State	✓	✓	✓	✓	✗	✓	✓	✓	7
St. Cloud State	✓	✓	✓	✗	✓	✗	✗	✓	5
Sioux Falls	✓	✓	✓	✓	✓	✓	✓	✓	8
Southwest Minnesota State	✓	✓	✓	✓	✗	✓	✓	✓	7
Wayne State	✓	✓	✓	✓	✗	✓	✓	✗	6
Winona State	✓	✓	✓	✓	✓	✗	✗	✗	5
Totals	15	16	15	14	10	13	13	11	105
Affiliate members
Parkside								✓	1

=== Women's sponsored sports by school ===
School	Basketball	Cross Country	Golf	Soccer	Softball	Swimming & Diving	Tennis	Track & Field Indoor	Track & Field Outdoor	Volleyball	Total NSIC Sports
Augustana	✓	✓	✓	✓	✓	✓	✓	✓	✓	✓	10
Bemidji State	✓	✓	✓	✓	✓	✗	✓	✓	✓	✓	9
Concordia–St. Paul	✓	✓	✓	✓	✓	✓	✗	✓	✓	✓	9
Jamestown	✓	✓	✓	✓	✓	✓	✓	✓	✓	✓	10
Mary	✓	✓	✗	✓	✓	✓	✓	✓	✓	✓	9
Minnesota State	✓	✓	✓	✓	✓	✓	✓	✓	✓	✓	10
MSU–Moorhead	✓	✓	✓	✓	✓	✓	✓	✓	✓	✓	10
Minnesota–Crookston	✓	✓	✓	✓	✓	✗	✓	✓	✓	✓	9
Minnesota–Duluth	✓	✓	✗	✓	✓	✗	✓	✓	✓	✓	8
Minot State	✓	✓	✓	✓	✓	✗	✗	✓	✓	✓	8
Northern State	✓	✓	✗	✓	✓	✓	✗	✓	✓	✓	8
St. Cloud State	✓	✓	✓	✓	✓	✓	✓	✓	✓	✓	10
Sioux Falls	✓	✓	✓	✓	✓	✓	✓	✓	✓	✓	10
Southwest Minnesota State	✓	✓	✓	✓	✓	✓	✓	✓	✓	✓	10
Wayne State	✓	✓	✗	✓	✓	✗	✗	✓	✓	✓	7
Winona State	✓	✓	✓	✓	✓	✗	✓	✓	✓	✓	9
Totals	16	16	12	16	16	10	12	16	16	16	143

=== Other sponsored sports by school ===
School	Men					Women					
School	Ice Hockey (Note: De facto Division I sport. The NCAA championships in women's acrobatics & tumbling, women's gymnastics, and the coeducational sport of skiing are open to members of all three divisions. In men's and women's ice hockey, the NCAA championship tournaments are open to members of Divisions I and II. The NCAA championships in bowling and women's wrestling are also open to all three divisions through 2026–27, after which Division II bowling and Division III women's wrestling championships will be established.)	Soccer	Swimming & Diving	Tennis	Volleyball	Acrobatics & Tumbling	Gymnastics	Ice Hockey	Lacrosse	Skiing	Wrestling
Augustana	CCHA		GLIAC	MIAA		IND					
Bemidji State	CCHA							WCHA			
Concordia–St. Paul									GLIAC		
Jamestown		IND (Note: Joining the GNAC in 2027.)			GLVC						IND
Minnesota State	CCHA							WCHA			
Minnesota–Duluth	NCHC							WCHA			
Sioux Falls											IND
St. Cloud State	NCHC	GLIAC	GLIAC					WCHA		CCSA (Note: While the NCAA-sponsored sport of skiing has coeducational teams with men's and women's squads, and covers both Alpine and Nordic disciplines, St. Cloud State fields only a women's Nordic team.)	
Winona State							WIAC				

Notes

In addition to the above teams, at least two conference schools are now sponsoring esports: SMSU and Concordia-St Paul.

== Conference stadiums ==
School	Football stadium	Capacity	Basketball arena	Capacity	Baseball Fields	Capacity
Augustana	Kirkeby–Over Stadium	6,500	Sanford Pentagon	3,250	Ronken Field	500
Bemidji State	Chet Anderson Stadium	4,000	BSU Gymnasium	2,500	BSU Field	250
Concordia–St. Paul	Sea Foam Stadium	3,500	Gangelhoff Center	3,200	Barnes Field	2,500
Jamestown	Rollie Greeno Field at Charlotte and Gordon Hansen Stadium		Harold Newman Arena	2,000	Jack Brown Stadium	
Mary	Bismarck Community Bowl	7,000	McDowell Activity Center	2,500	Bismarck Municipal Ball Park	2,000
Minnesota State	Blakeslee Stadium	7,500	Taylor Center	4,800	Bowyer Field	450
MSU–Moorhead	Alex Nemzek Stadium	5,000	Alex Nemzek Fieldhouse	3,500	Non-baseball school	
Minnesota–Crookston	Non-football school		Lysaker Gymnasium	3,500	UMC Baseball Field	300
Minnesota–Duluth	Griggs Field at James S. Malosky Stadium	4,000	Romano Gymnasium	2,759	Wade Stadium	4,200
Minot State	Herb Parker Stadium	4,500	MSU Dome	10,000	Corbett Field	2,000
Northern State	Dacotah Bank Stadium	4,500	Wachs Arena	8,057	Fossum Field	2,500
Sioux Falls	Bob Young Field	5,400	Stewart Center	2,000	Sioux Falls Stadium	4,500
St. Cloud State	Non-football school		Halenbeck Hall	6,927	Joe Faber Field	2,000
Southwest Minnesota State	Mattke Field at the Regional Events Center	3,500	R/A Facility	4,000	Legion Field	
Wayne State	Memorial Stadium	3,500	Rice Auditorium	2,500	Pete Chapman Baseball Complex	
Winona State	Maxwell Field at Warrior Stadium	3,500	McCown Gymnasium	3,500	Loughrey Field	500

== National champions ==
=== NCAA Division II ===
The NSIC has had 27 national championship teams in NCAA Division II play:

NCAA Division II National Champions

Year	School	Sport
2006	Winona State	Men's Basketball
2007	Concordia–St. Paul	Volleyball
2008	Minnesota–Duluth	Football
2008	Concordia–St. Paul	Volleyball
2008	Winona State	Men's Basketball
2009	Concordia–St. Paul	Volleyball
2009	Minnesota State	Women's Basketball
2010	Concordia–St. Paul	Volleyball
2010	Minnesota–Duluth	Football
2011	Augustana	Women's Cross Country
2011	Concordia–St. Paul	Volleyball
2012	Concordia–St. Paul	Volleyball
2013	Concordia–St. Paul	Volleyball
2015	St. Cloud State	Wrestling
2016	St. Cloud State	Wrestling
2016	Augustana	Men's Basketball
2016	Concordia–St. Paul	Volleyball
2017	Minnesota State	Softball
2017	Concordia–St. Paul	Volleyball
2018	St. Cloud State	Wrestling
2018	Augustana	Baseball
2019	St. Cloud State	Wrestling
2019	Augustana	Softball
2021	St. Cloud State	Wrestling
2022	Minnesota State	Women's Indoor Track & Field
2024	Minnesota State	Women's Basketball
2024	Minnesota State	Men's Basketball

=== NAIA ===
NAIA National Champions

Year	School	Sport
1958	Mankato State	Wrestling
1959	Mankato State	Wrestling
1964	Moorhead State	Wrestling
1985	Winona State	Women's Gymnastics
1987	Winona State	Women's Gymnastics
1992	Northern State	Women's Basketball
1994	Northern State	Women's Basketball

== Commissioners ==
The NSIC has had five full-time commissioners in its history.

1. Tom Wistrcill (1993–1997)
2. Kurt Patberg (1997–2000)
3. Mike Lockrem (2000–2003)
4. Butch Raymond (2004–2014)
5. Erin Lind (2014–present)

== Conference championships ==
Last updated November 9, 2026

Includes Regular Season Championships

School	Total Championships	Men's Championships	Women's Championships	Men's Tournament Championships	Women's Tournament Championships
Minnesota–Duluth	213	84	108	3	18
Minnesota State	217	151	39	11	16
Winona State	137	76	39	8	14
MSU-Moorhead	128	98	27	3	0
St. Cloud State	102	73	15	6	8
Augustana	111	28	52	7	24
Southwest Minnesota State	59	15	33	6	5
Bemidji State	53	40	11	0	2
Northern State	48	26	14	6	2
Concordia–St. Paul	48	5	24	2	17
Wayne State	34	11	12	6	5
Mary	24	1	21	0	2
Minnesota–Morris	16	15	1	0	0
Michigan Tech	9	9	0	0	0
Upper Iowa	7	3	3	0	1
Sioux Falls	3	2	0	0	1
Minot State	3	1	1	0	1
Minnesota–Crookston	1	1	0	0	0
Wisconsin–Parkside	1	1	0	0	0
Jamestown	0	0	0	0	0

=== Football ===
NSIC Championships Won or Shared Per School

School	Conference		Division	
School	Titles	Last Title	Titles	Last Title
Minnesota State	23	2026	12	2026
Minnesota–Duluth	22	2025	13	2025
Winona State	18	2007	2	2022
St. Cloud State	15	2011	1	2011
MSU-Moorhead	14	1995	0	N/A
Bemidji State	7	2022	5	2026
Michigan Tech	7	1974	—	—
Minnesota–Morris	6	1984	—	—
Augustana	4	2026	4	2026
Northern State	3	1999	2	2026
Concordia–St. Paul	2	2005	0	N/A
Sioux Falls	1	2016	2	2021
Southwest Minnesota State	1	1990	0	N/A
Wayne State	1	2022	2	2025
Mary	0	N/A	0	N/A
Minot State	0	N/A	0	N/A
Jamestown	0	N/A	0	N/A

NSIC All-Time Standings (1932–2025)

School	W	L	T	Pct
Minnesota–Duluth	317	101	5	.755
Sioux Falls	101	39	0	.721
Minnesota State	247	94	8	.719
Augustana	122	58	0	.678
St. Cloud State	214	134	9	.612
Michigan Tech	71	53	1	.572
Winona State	294	275	8	.516
Northern State	185	162	3	.533
MSU-Moorhead	280	283	9	.497
Bemidji State	271	303	9	.473
Wayne State	125	128	0	.494
Minnesota–Morris	99	117	4	.459
Concordia–St. Paul	98	155	0	.387
Southwest Minnesota State	148	282	5	.346
Upper Iowa	49	118	0	.293
Mary	57	132	0	.302
Minot State	28	112	0	.200
Minnesota–Crookston	23	169	0	.120
Jamestown	1	9	0	.100

NSIC North Division All-Time Standings (2008-2022)(2025-)

School	W	L	Pct.
Minnesota–Duluth	92	6	.939
Bemidji State	67	31	.684
St. Cloud State	54	26	.675
Northern State	55	43	.561
MSU-Moorhead	45	53	.459
Mary	32	66	.327
Minot State	19	55	.257
Concordia–St. Paul	1	11	.083
Minnesota–Crookston	6	74	.075
Jamestown	0	6	.000

NSIC South Division All-Time Standings (2008-2022)(2025-)

School	W	L	Pct.
Minnesota State	85	13	.867
Sioux Falls	52	22	.703
Winona State	62	36	.633
Augustana	60	38	.612
Wayne State	44	54	.449
Concordia–St. Paul	26	60	.302
Southwest Minnesota State	26	72	.283
Upper Iowa	16	76	.174

NSIC Champions

Year	School	Record
1932	Duluth State; Mankato State; MSU-Moorhead; St. Cloud State	2-1-0
1933	St. Cloud State	4-0-0
1934	MSU-Moorhead	4-0-0
1935	MSU-Moorhead	4-0-0
1936	St. Cloud State	4-0-0
1937	Duluth State	3-0-0
1938	Duluth State; Mankato State	3-0-0
1939	Winona State	4-0-0
1940	St. Cloud State	4-0-0
1941	St. Cloud State	4-0-0
1942	Mankato State; St. Cloud State	4-0-0
1943	World War II (no champion)	
1944	World War II (no champion)	
1945	World War II (no champion)	
1946	Duluth State; Mankato State	2-0-2; 3-0-1
1947	Bemidji State; MSU-Moorhead; Winona State	3-1-0

Year	School	Record
1948	Mankato State; Minnesota–Duluth; St. Cloud State	4-1-0
1949	Mankato State	3-1-0
1950	Bemidji State; Mankato State	3-0-1
1951	St. Cloud State	4-0-0
1952	Mankato State; MSU-Moorhead; St. Cloud State	3-1-0
1953	St. Cloud State	4-0-0
1954	St. Cloud State	4-0-0
1955	St. Cloud State	4-0-0
1956	St. Cloud State	3-0-1
1957	Bemidji State; Winona State	3-1-0
1958	Mankato State	5-0-0
1959	Bemidji State; Mankato State; Michigan Tech	4-1-0
1960	Mankato State	4-0-1
1961	Mankato State	5-0-0
1962	Winona State	5-0-0
1963	Michigan Tech	4-1-0
1964	Winona State	5-0-0
1965	Michigan Tech	4-1-0

Year	School	Record
1966	MSU-Moorhead	4-1-0
1967	St. Cloud State	5-0-0
1968	Mankato State; Winona State	4-1-0
1969	Michigan Tech	4-1-0
1970	Michigan Tech; Minnesota–Morris; St. Cloud State	5-1-0
1971	MSU-Moorhead	6-0-0
1972	Michigan Tech	6-0-0
1973	MSU-Moorhead	5-1-0
1974	Michigan Tech	6-0-0
1975	Minnesota–Morris	6-0-0
1976	Minnesota–Morris	7-0-0
1977	Minnesota–Morris	7-0-0
1978	Minnesota–Morris	8-0-0
1979	Minnesota–Duluth; MSU-Moorhead	7-1-0
1980	Minnesota–Duluth	8-0-0
1981	MSU-Moorhead	6-0-0
1982	MSU-Moorhead	5-0-1
1983	Winona State	5-1-0
1984	Minnesota–Morris; MSU-Moorhead	5-1-0
1985	Minnesota–Duluth	6-0-0
1986	Minnesota–Morris	4-0-2

Year	School	Record
1987	Minnesota–Duluth	5-1-0
1988	MSU-Moorhead	6-0-0
1989	MSU-Moorhead	5-1-0
1990	Minnesota–Duluth; Northern State; Southwest State	5-1-0
1991	MSU-Moorhead	5-0-0
1992	Northern State	5-1-0
1993	Winona State	5-1-0
1994	Winona State	5-0-1
1995	Minnesota–Duluth; MSU-Moorhead	5-0-1
1996	Minnesota–Duluth	6-0-0
1997	Winona State	6-0-0
1998	Winona State	6-0-0
1999	Northern State	8-0-0
2000	Winona State	7-1-0
2001	Winona State	9-0-0
2002	Minnesota–Duluth	9-0-0
2003	Concordia–St. Paul; Winona State	7-1-0
2004	Winona State	7-0-0
2005	Concordia–St. Paul; Winona State	6-1-0
2006	Bemidji State	8-0-0
2007	Winona State	9-0-0

	North Division		South Division		NSIC Overall	
Year	School	Record	School	Record	School	Record
2008	Minnesota–Duluth	6-0	Minnesota State; Wayne State	5-1; 5-1	Minnesota–Duluth	10-0
2009	Minnesota–Duluth	6-0	Minnesota State	6-0	Minnesota–Duluth	10-0
2010	Minnesota–Duluth	6-0	Augustana; Winona State	5-1; 5-1	Minnesota–Duluth	10-0
2011	Minnesota–Duluth; St. Cloud State	5-1; 5-1	Minnesota State	6-0	Minnesota State; Minnesota–Duluth; St. Cloud State	8-2; 8-2; 8-2
2012 *	Bemidji State; Minnesota–Duluth	6-1; 6-1	Winona State	6-1	Minnesota–Duluth	10-1
2013	Minnesota–Duluth	7-0	Minnesota State	7-0	Minnesota State	11-0
2014	Minnesota–Duluth	7-0	Minnesota State	7-0	Minnesota–Duluth; Minnesota State	11-0
2015	Minnesota-Duluth; Northern State; Bemidji State	6-1	Minnesota State; Augustana	6-1	Minnesota State	10-1
2016	Minnesota-Duluth	7-0	Sioux Falls	7-0	Sioux Falls	11-0
2017	Minnesota-Duluth	7-0	Minnesota State	7-0	Minnesota State	11-0
2018	Minnesota-Duluth	7-0	Minnesota State	7-0	Minnesota–Duluth; Minnesota State	11-0
2019	Minnesota-Duluth	7-0	Minnesota State	7-0	Minnesota State	11-0
2020	n/a		n/a		n/a	
2021	Bemidji State	6-0	Augustana; Sioux Falls	5-1	Bemidji State; Minnesota Duluth; Augustana	9-2
2022	Bemidji State	6-0	Minnesota State; Winona State	5-1	Bemidji State; Minnesota State; Wayne State	9-2

Year	School	Record
2023 **	Augustana	9-1-0
2024	Augustana	8-2-0

	North Division		South Division		NSIC Overall	
Year	School	Record	School	Record	School	Record
2025	Minnesota–Duluth	5-1	Minnesota State; Wayne State	5-1; 5-1	Minnesota–Duluth	9-1
2026	Northern State; Bemidji State	5-1	Minnesota State; Augustana	5-1	Minnesota State; Augustana	8-2

*Minnesota State finished 2012 with an 11-0 overall conference record and 7-0 division record, however the conference and division titles were stripped after Mankato was found to have played with two ineligible players. Minnesota–Duluth (overall) and Winona State (South Division) were granted the 2012 titles retroactively. Mankato's win–loss record, however, remains the same.

**Following the 2022 season Upper Iowa left the conference. This led to a removal of the North and South divisions during the 2023 and 2024 seasons.

=== Volleyball ===
NSIC Championships Per School

School	Conference		Tournament	
School	Titles	Last Title	Titles	Last Title
Minnesota–Duluth	24	2018	3	2018
Concordia–St. Paul	15	2025	7	2023
Southwest Minnesota State	4	2016	2	2017
Wayne State	5	2026	1	2007
St. Cloud State	3	2024	4	2025
MSU-Moorhead	3	2000	0	N/A
Northern State	2	2019	0	N/A
Bemidji State	1	1988	0	N/A
Augustana	0	N/A	0	N/A
Mary	0	N/A	0	N/A
Minnesota–Crookston	0	N/A	0	N/A
Minnesota State	0	N/A	0	N/A
Upper Iowa	0	N/A	0	N/A
Winona State	0	N/A	0	N/A
Minot State	0	N/A	0	N/A
Jamestown	0	N/A	0	N/A

The NSIC Tournament was only held from 2004 to 2007, then resumed in 2012.

NSIC All-Time Standings (1979 to 2026)

School	W	L	Pct	Tournament	
School	W	L	Pct	W	L
Minnesota–Duluth	550	110	.833	15	8
Concordia–St. Paul	428	80	.843	35	10
Wayne State	382	126	.752	14	16
Southwest Minnesota State	505	221	.696	18	14
Augustana	200	156	.562	3	8
Minnesota State	206	170	.548	0	7
MSU-Moorhead	351	356	.496	5	3
Sioux Falls	142	134	.514	1	7
Winona State	338	388	.466	5	13
Northern State	326	350	.482	5	17
St. Cloud State	199	190	.512	13	2
Upper Iowa	118	196	.376	1	4
Bemidji State	215	511	.296	0	4
Minnesota–Morris	73	239	.234	0	0
Minnesota–Crookston	92	415	.181	0	4
Minot State	31	245	.112	0	0
Mary	59	332	.151	0	1
Jamestown	17	23	.425	0	0

NSIC Regular Season Champions

Year	School
1979	Minnesota–Duluth
1980	Minnesota–Duluth
1981	Minnesota–Duluth
1982	St. Cloud State
1983	Minnesota–Duluth
1984	Minnesota–Duluth
1985	Minnesota–Duluth; Southwest State
1986	Minnesota–Duluth
1987	Minnesota–Duluth

Year	School
1988	Bemidji State; Minnesota–Duluth
1989	Minnesota–Duluth
1990	Minnesota–Duluth
1991	Minnesota–Duluth
1992	MSU-Moorhead
1993	Minnesota–Duluth
1994	Minnesota–Duluth
1995	Minnesota–Duluth
1996	Minnesota–Duluth

Year	School
1997	Minnesota–Duluth
1998	Minnesota–Duluth
1999	Minnesota–Duluth
2000	MSU-Moorhead
2001	Southwest State; Wayne State
2002	Minnesota–Duluth
2003	Concordia–St. Paul
2004	Concordia–St. Paul
2005	Concordia–St. Paul
2006	Concordia–St. Paul
2007	Concordia–St. Paul

Year	School
2008	Concordia–St. Paul
2009	Concordia–St. Paul
2010	Concordia–St. Paul
2011	Concordia–St. Paul; Minnesota–Duluth
2012	Concordia–St. Paul; Minnesota–Duluth; Southwest Minnesota State
2013	Concordia–St. Paul
2014	Minnesota–Duluth
2015	Concordia-St. Paul
2016	Concordia-St. Paul; Southwest Minnesota State

Year	School
2017	Concordia-St. Paul
2018	Northern State; Minnesota Duluth
2019	Northern State
2020	Cancelled due to COVID-19
2021	St. Cloud State
2022	Wayne State
2023	Wayne State
2024	St. Cloud State
2025	Concordia-St. Paul; Wayne State
2026	Wayne State

NSIC Tournament Champions

Year	School
2004	Concordia–St. Paul
2005	Concordia–St. Paul
2006	Concordia–St. Paul
2007	Wayne State
2008-2011 (Not Held)
2012	Southwest Minnesota State
2013	Minnesota–Duluth
2014	Minnesota–Duluth
2015	Concordia-St. Paul
2016	Concordia-St. Paul
2017	Southwest Minnesota State
2018	Minnesota-Duluth
2019	Concordia-St. Paul
2020	Cancelled due to COVID-19
2021	St. Cloud State
2022	St. Cloud State
2023	Concordia-St. Paul
2024	St. Cloud State
2025	St. Cloud State

=== Men's Basketball ===
NSIC championships won per school

School	Conference		Division		Tournament	
School	Titles	Last Title	Titles	Last Title	Titles	Last Title
Minnesota State	18	2023–24	3	2018–19	3	2024
Minnesota–Duluth	16	2001–02	2	2025–26	3	2026
St. Cloud State	17	2025–26	3	2025–26	2	2010
Winona State	14	2007–08	0	N/A	5	2011
Northern State	14	2022–23	5	2022–23	6	2021
Bemidji State	9	2011–12	1	2013–14	0	N/A
MSU-Moorhead	6	2016–17	4	2016–17	3	2025
Augustana	3	2021–22	4	2021–22	1	2016
Minnesota–Morris	3	1993–94	—	—	—	—
Southwest Minnesota State	3	2024–25	2	2017–18	2	2017
Michigan Tech	2	1979–80	—	—	—	—
Wayne State	1	1999–00	2	2020–21	1	2000
Concordia–St. Paul	1	2024–25	0	N/A	0	N/A
Sioux Falls	0	N/A	2	2022–23	0	N/A
Upper Iowa	0	N/A	1	2022-23	0	N/A

NSIC All-Time Standings (1932–33 to 2025-26)

School	W	L	Pct	Tournament	
School	W	L	Pct	W	L
Augustana	250	130	.658	19	16
Northern State	520	273	.656	37	16
St. Cloud State	230	149	.607	19	15
Minnesota State	258	122	.679	28	13
Minnesota–Duluth	438	348	.557	26	17
Winona State	642	566	.531	33	20
MSU-Moorhead	625	577	.520	26	22
Sioux Falls	147	146	.502	8	12
Upper Iowa	171	181	.486	10	13
Southwest Minnesota State	443	462	.490	29	23
Wayne State	243	290	.456	10	21
Minot State	137	183	.428	6	14
Bemidji State	525	707	.426	9	20
Minnesota–Morris	197	289	.405	0	3
Michigan Tech	95	166	.364	0	0
Mary	136	283	.325	4	12
Concordia–St. Paul	198	333	.373	4	19
Minnesota–Crookston	90	446	.168	1	10
Jamestown	12	10	.545	0	0

NSIC Regular Season Champions

Year	School	Record
1932-33	Mankato State	6-2
1933-34	Duluth State	6-1
1934-35	Duluth State	7-1
1935-36	Duluth State	8-1
1936-37	Duluth State	8-0
1937-38	Winona State	7-1
1938-39	Winona State	7-1
1939-40	Bemidji State	8-1
1940-41	Bemidji State; St. Cloud State	6-2; 6-2
1941-42	Bemidji State	9-1
1942-43	St. Cloud State	5-1
1943-44	World War II (no champion)	
1944-45	World War II (no champion)	
1945-46	St. Cloud State	6-0
1946-47	Mankato State	8-2
1947-48	Mankato State	8-2
1948-49	Mankato State	9-1
1949-50	Mankato State	6-2
1950-51	Bemidji State; Mankato State; Winona State	6-2; 6-2; 6-2
1951-52	Bemidji State	7-1
1952-53	Mankato State	11-3
1953-54	Mankato State	7-2
1954-55	Mankato State	7-1
1955-56	Mankato State	7-2
1956-57	Bemidji State; St. Cloud State	6-2; 6-2
1957-58	St. Cloud State	7-1
1958-59	St. Cloud State	8-2

Year	School	Record
1959-60	Mankato State; St. Cloud State	9-1; 9-1
1960-61	Mankato State	9-1
1961-62	St. Cloud State	7-3
1962-63	Michigan Tech; St. Cloud State	8-2; 8-2
1963-64	St. Cloud State	9-1
1964-65	MSU-Moorhead; St. Cloud State	8-2; 8-2
1965-66	St. Cloud State	9-1
1966-67	Bemidji State	12-0
1967-68	St. Cloud State	12-0
1968-69	St. Cloud State; Winona State	10-2; 10-2
1969-70	St. Cloud State	10-2
1970-71	MSU-Moorhead	11-1
1971-72	Winona State	11-1
1972-73	Winona State	12-0
1973-74	Winona State	10-2
1974-75	Winona State	11-1
1975-76	St. Cloud State	9-3
1976-77	Minnesota–Morris	12-2
1977-78	Minnesota–Morris	12-2
1978-79	Mankato State	14-2
1979-80	Michigan Tech	16-2
1980-81	MSU-Moorhead	13-3
1981-82	Minnesota–Duluth; MSU-Moorhead	10-2; 10-2
1982-83	Minnesota–Duluth	10-2
1983-84	Minnesota–Duluth; Northern State	10-2; 10-2
1984-85	Northern State	9-3

Year	School	Record
1985-86	Minnesota–Duluth	11-1
1986-87	Minnesota–Duluth	11-1
1987-88	Minnesota–Duluth	12-0
1988-89	Minnesota–Duluth	12-0
1989-90	Minnesota–Duluth	11-1
1990-91	Minnesota–Duluth	10-2
1991-92	Minnesota–Duluth	10-2
1992-93	Northern State	11-1
1993-94	Minnesota–Morris	10-2
1994-95	Northern State	10-2
1995-96	Northern State	10-2
1996-97	Minnesota–Duluth; Northern State	10-2; 10-2
1997-98	Northern State	11-1
1998-99	Northern State; Winona State	10-2; 10-2
1999-00	Wayne State; Winona State	15-3; 15-3
2000-01	Southwest Minnesota State	17-1
2001-02	Minnesota–Duluth; Northern State	14-4; 14-4
2002-03	Northern State	15-3
2003-04	Bemidji State	14-2
2004-05	Winona State	12-2
2005-06	Winona State	13-1
2006-07	Winona State	18-0
2007-08	Winona State	18-0
2008-09	Southwest Minnesota State	17-3
2009-10	Minnesota State	17-3
2010-11	Minnesota State	19-3
2011-12	Bemidji State	16-6

	North Division		South Division		NSIC Overall	
Year	School	Record	School	Record	School	Record
2012–13	St. Cloud State	15-7	Minnesota State	18-4	Minnesota State	18-4
2013–14	Bemidji State; MSU-Moorhead; St. Cloud State	15-7; 15-7; 15-7	Minnesota State	19-3	Minnesota State	19-3
2014–15	MSU-Moorhead	20-2	Augustana	20-2	Augustana; MSU-Moorhead	20-2
2015–16	MSU-Moorhead	19-3	Augustana	21-1	Augustana	21-1
2016–17	MSU-Moorhead	19-3	Southwest Minnesota State	17-5	MSU-Moorhead	19-3
2017–18	Northern State	20-2	Southwest Minnesota State	17-5	Northern State	20-2
2018–19	Northern State	18-4	Minnesota State; Augustana; Wayne State	14-8	Northern State	18-4
2019–20	Northern State	18-4	Sioux Falls	17-5	Northern State	18-4
2020–21	Northern State	13-1	Wayne State	10-4	No team awarded (*)	
2021–22	Minnesota Duluth	16-4	Augustana	17-2	Augustana	17-2
2022–23	Northern State	19-3	Sioux Falls	13-9	Northern State	19-3

Year	School	Record
2023–24**	Minnesota State	20–2
2024–25	Concordia–St. Paul; Southwest Minnesota State	16–6

	North Division		South Division		NSIC Overall	
Year	School	Record	School	Record	School	Record
2025–26	Minnesota Duluth	13–19	St. Cloud State	20–2	St. Cloud State	20–2

(*)-Due to the COVID-19 pandemic, no regular season conference champion was awarded during the 2020-21 season, only the winner of the North and South division were awarded.

(**)-Following the departure of Upper Iowa, the North and South division were removed for the 2023–24 and the 2024–25 seasons.

NSIC Tournament Champions

Year	School
2000	Wayne State
2001	Winona State
2002	Minnesota–Duluth
2003	Minnesota–Duluth
2004	Northern State
2005	Northern State
2006	Winona State
2007	Winona State
2008	Winona State
2009	St. Cloud State
2010	St. Cloud State
2011	Winona State
2012	Southwest Minnesota State
2013	Minnesota State
2014	Minnesota State
2015	Augustana
2016	Augustana
2017	Southwest Minnesota State
2018	Northern State
2019	Northern State
2020	Northern State
2021	Northern State
2022	MSU-Moorhead
2023	MSU-Moorhead
2024	Minnesota State
2025	MSU-Moorhead
2026	Minnesota-Duluth

=== Women's Basketball ===
NSIC Championships Per School

School	Conference		Division		Tournament	
School	Titles	Last Title	Titles	Last Title	Titles	Last Title
Minnesota–Duluth	14	2022-23	5	2025-26	8	2023
Northern State	7	2017-18	4	2017-18	2	2017
Concordia–St. Paul	6	2024-25	2	2018-19	5	2026
MSU-Moorhead	6	2018-19	4	2018-19	0	N/A
Wayne State	5	2014-15	2	2014-15	3	2012
Southwest Minnesota State	4	2001-02	0	N/A	1	2002
St. Cloud State	4	2021-22	2	2021-22	2	2020
Minnesota State	3	2025-26	3	2025-26	1	2024
Bemidji State	3	1986-87	0	N/A	0	N/A
Augustana	1	2017-18	3	2020-21	2	2018
Minnesota–Morris	1	1981-82	—	—	0	N/A
Winona State	1	2015-16	1	2015-16	1	2011
Sioux Falls	0	N/A	1	2019-20	1	2017
Mary	0	N/A	0	N/A	0	N/A
Minnesota–Crookston	0	N/A	0	N/A	0	N/A
Minot State	0	N/A	0	N/A	0	N/A
Upper Iowa	0	N/A	0	N/A	0	N/A

NSIC All-Time Standings (1979-80 to 2025-26)

School	W	L	Pct	Tournament	
School	W	L	Pct	W	L
Minnesota–Duluth	485	220	.688	36	15
Augustana	230	150	.605	22	14
Wayne State	316	218	.592	25	20
Northern State	456	243	.652	28	23
Concordia–St. Paul	349	186	.652	34	17
Sioux Falls	159	138	.535	16	12
Minnesota State	287	134	.682	20	16
St. Cloud State	259	184	.585	18	13
MSU-Moorhead	425	335	.559	20	27
Mary	222	193	.535	12	15
Winona State	310	455	.358	17	23
Southwest Minnesota State	327	437	.428	15	21
Bemidij State	253	512	.331	4	18
Minot State	105	190	.356	1	11
Minnesota–Crookston	165	366	.311	5	15
Minnesota–Morris	88	198	.308	0	3
Upper Iowa	46	306	.114	0	9
Jamestown	6	16	.273	0	0

NSIC Regular Season Champions

Year	School	Record
1979-80	Bemidji State; St. Cloud State; Southwest State	5-2; 5-2; 5-2
1980-81	Southwest State	7-0
1981-82	Minnesota–Morris; MSU-Moorhead; St. Cloud State	10-4; 10-4; 10-4
1982-83	St. Cloud State	14-0
1983-84	St. Cloud State	12-0
1984-85	Minnesota–Duluth; MSU-Moorhead	7-3; 7-3
1985-86	Bemidji State	11-1
1986-87	Bemidji State	12-0
1987-88	Northern State	11-1

Year	School	Record
1988-89	Minnesota–Duluth	11-1
1989-90	Minnesota–Duluth	11-1
1990-91	Minnesota–Duluth	12-0
1991-92	Northern State	10-2
1992-93	Minnesota–Duluth	11-1
1993-94	Northern State	12-0
1994-95	Minnesota–Duluth; Northern State	11-1; 11-1
1995-96	Minnesota–Duluth	12-0
1996-97	Northern State	11-1
1997-98	Minnesota–Duluth; Northern State	10-2; 10-2
1998-99	Minnesota–Duluth	10-2

Year	School	Record
1999-00	Minnesota–Duluth	16-2
2000-01	Southwest Minnesota State	17-1
2001-02	Southwest Minnesota State	14-4
2002-03	Minnesota–Duluth	15-3
2003-04	Concordia–St. Paul	15-1
2004-05	MSU-Moorhead	12-2
2005-06	Wayne State	13-1
2006-07	Concordia–St. Paul	15-3
2007-08	Concordia–St. Paul	16-2
2008-09	Minnesota State	19-1
2009-10	Concordia–St. Paul	17-3
2010-11	Wayne State	21-1
2011-12	Wayne State	20-2

	North Division		South Division		NSIC Overall	
Year	School	Record	School	Record	School	Record
2012-13	St. Cloud State	14-8	Concordia–St. Paul	19-3	Concordia–St. Paul	19-3
2013-14	Northern State	17-5	Wayne State	19-3	Wayne State	19-3
2014-15	Northern State	16-6	Wayne State	18-4	Wayne State	18-4
2015-16	Northern State; MSU-Moorhead	17-5	Winona State	20-2	Winona State	20-2
2016-17	MSU-Moorhead	20-2	Augustana	17-5	MSU-Moorhead	20-2
2017-18	Northern State; MSU-Moorhead	19-3	Augustana	19-3	Northern State; MSU-Moorhead; Augustana	19-3
2018-19	MSU-Moorhead	19-3	Concordia-St. Paul	17-5	MSU-Moorhead	19-3
2019-20	Minnesota-Duluth	20-2	Sioux Falls	17-5	Minnesota-Duluth	20-2
2020-21	Minnesota-Duluth	9-1	Augustana	10-3	No team awarded (*)	
2021-22	St. Cloud State; Minnesota-Duluth	19-2	Minnesota State	16-5	St. Cloud State; Minnesota-Duluth	19-2
2022-23	Minnesota-Duluth	21-1	Minnesota State	19-3	Minnesota Duluth	21-1

Year	School	Record
2023-24**	Minnesota State	20-2
2024-25	Concordia-St. Paul	20-2

	North Division		South Division		NSIC Overall	
Year	School	Record	School	Record	School	Record
2025–26	Minnesota Duluth	17–5	Minnesota State	21–1	Minnesota State	21–1

(*)-Due to the COVID-19 pandemic, no regular season conference championship was awarded during the 2020-21 season, on the North and South division champions were awarded.

(**)-Following the departure of Upper Iowa, the North and South division were removed for the 2023–24 and the 2024–25 seasons.

NSIC Tournament Champions

Year	School
2000	Minnesota–Duluth
2001	Minnesota–Duluth
2002	Southwest Minnesota State
2003	Minnesota–Duluth
2004	Minnesota–Duluth
2005	Concordia–St. Paul
2006	Wayne State
2007	Concordia–St. Paul
2008	Concordia–St. Paul
2009	St. Cloud State
2010	Wayne State
2011	Winona State
2012	Wayne State
2013	Augustana
2014	Concordia–St. Paul
2015	Northern State
2016	Sioux Falls
2017	Northern State
2018	Augustana
2019	Minnesota-Duluth
2020	St. Cloud State
2021	Minnesota-Duluth
2022	Minnesota-Duluth
2023	Minnesota-Duluth
2024	Minnesota State
2025	Concordia-St. Paul
2026	Concordia-St. Paul

=== Baseball ===
NSIC Championships Per School

School	Conference		Tournament	
School	Titles	Last Title	Titles	Last Title
Winona State	21	2001	3	2007
Minnesota State	12	2025	8	2025
St. Cloud State	10	2015	4	2023
Southwest Minnesota State	4	2002	4	2002
Minnesota–Duluth	4	2016	0	N/A
Wayne State	3	2009	5	2006
Augustana	5	2026	5	2026
Bemidji State	2	1997	0	N/A
MSU-Moorhead	2	1983	0	N/A
Northern State	1	1993	0	N/A
Minnesota–Morris	1	1970	0	N/A
Minot State	1	2018	0	N/A
Concordia–St. Paul	0	N/A	2	2008
Mary	0	N/A	0	N/A
Minnesota–Crookston	0	N/A	0	N/A
Upper Iowa	0	N/A	0	N/A

NSIC Regular Season Champions

The NSIC Tournament was used to determine the overall NSIC Champion from 2002 to 2006.

Year	School
1960	Mankato State
1961	Winona State
1962	Winona State
1963	MSU-Moorhead; Winona State
1964	St. Cloud State
1965	St. Cloud State
1966	Winona State
1967	St. Cloud State
1968	Mankato State
1969	St. Cloud State
1970	Minnesota–Morris; St. Cloud State
1971	St. Cloud State
1972	Winona State
1973	Winona State

Year	School
1974	Southwest State
1975	Winona State
1976	St. Cloud State
1977	Winona State
1978	St. Cloud State
1979	Mankato State
1980	Mankato State; Winona State
1981	Mankato State
1982	Bemidji State
1983	MSU-Moorhead
1984	Winona State
1985	Winona State
1986	Winona State
1987	Winona State
1988	Winona State

Year	School
1989	Winona State
1990	Winona State
1991	Winona State
1992	Minnesota–Duluth
1993	Minnesota–Duluth; Northern State
1994	Southwest State
1995	Winona State
1996	Southwest State
1997	Bemdiji State
1998	Winona State
1999	Minnesota–Duluth
2000	Winona State
2001	Winona State
2002	Southwest State
2003	Concordia–St. Paul; Wayne State

Year	School
2004	Wayne State
2005	Wayne State
2006	Wayne State
2007	Wayne State
2008	Wayne State
2009	Wayne State
2010	Minnesota State
2011	Minnesota State
2012	Minnesota State
2013	St. Cloud State
2014	Minnesota State
2015	St. Cloud State
2016	Minnesota Duluth
2017	Minnesota State
2018	Minot State
2019	Augustana
2020	Cancelled due to COVID-19
2021	Minnesota State

Year	School
2022	Augustana
2023	Augustana
2024	Augustana
2025	Minnesota State
2026	Augustana

NSIC Tournament Champions

Year	School
1996	Southwest State
1997	Southwest State
1998	Winona State
1999	Southwest State
2000	Winona State
2001	Wayne State
2002	Southwest State
2003	Concordia–St. Paul; Wayne State
2004	Wayne State
2005	Wayne State
2006	Wayne State
2007	Winona State
2008	Concordia–St. Paul
2009	Minnesota State
2010	Minnesota State
2011	St. Cloud State
2012	Minnesota State
2013	Minnesota State
2014	Augustana
2015	St. Cloud State
2016	St. Cloud State
2017	Minnesota State
2018	Augustana
2019	Augustana
2020	Cancelled due to COVID-19
2021	Minnesota State
2022	Minnesota State
2023	St. Cloud State
2024	Augustana
2025	Minnesota State
2026	Augustana

=== Softball ===
NSIC Championships Per School

School	Conference		Tournament	
School	Titles	Last Title	Titles	Last Title
Minnesota–Duluth	14	2013	5	2023
Southwest Minnesota State	10	2009	2	2007
Augustana	8	2025	6	2026
Minnesota State	5	2017	4	2021
Winona State	6	2026	7	2018
Concordia–St. Paul	1	2001	4	2006
Bemidji State	1	1999	0	N/A
MSU-Moorhead	1	1990	0	N/A
St. Cloud State	1	2026	0	N/A
Wayne State	0	N/A	1	2010
Upper Iowa	0	N/A	1	2016
Mary	0	N/A	0	N/A
Minnesota–Crookston	0	N/A	0	N/A
Northern State	0	N/A	0	N/A

NSIC All-Time Standings (1984 to 2025)

School	W	L	T	Pct	Tournament	
School	W	L	T	Pct	W	L
Augustana	392	79	0	.832	51	24
Minnesota–Duluth	526	175	0	.750	57	42
Minnesota State	358	115	0	.757	37	24
Winona State	573	185	0	.756	77	45
Southwest Minnesota State	353	343	1	.507	47	44
Wayne State	322	302	0	.516	33	38
Concordia–St. Paul	347	267	0	.565	41	32
Sioux Falls	181	185	0	.495	13	20
Mary	181	309	0	.369	7	12
Minot State	185	178	0	.510	11	17
Upper Iowa	186	226	0	.451	7	17
St. Cloud State	252	212	1	.543	16	19
MSU-Moorhead	299	480	0	.384	25	30
Northern State	255	498	1	.339	13	34
Bemidji State	227	565	1	.287	15	32
Minnesota–Morris	36	192	1	.159	0	14
Minnesota–Crookston	77	526	1	.128	0	10
Jamestown	11	19	0	.367	N/A	N/A

NSIC Regular Season Champions

Year	School
1984	Minnesota–Duluth
1985	Southwest State
1986	Southwest State
1987	Minnesota–Duluth
1988	Minnesota–Duluth
1989	Minnesota–Duluth
1990	MSU-Moorhead
1991	Minnesota–Duluth
1992	Minnesota–Duluth
1993	Southwest State
1994	Southwest State
1995	Minnesota–Duluth
1996	Minnesota–Duluth
1997	Minnesota–Duluth
1998	Minnesota–Duluth

Year	School
1999	Bemidji State; Southwest State
2000	Minnesota–Duluth
2001	Concordia–St. Paul
2002	Minnesota–Duluth
2003	Minnesota–Duluth; Winona State
2004	Southwest Minnesota State
2005	Winona State
2006	Southwest Minnesota State
2007	Southwest Minnesota State; Winona State
2008	Southwest Minnesota State
2009	Southwest Minnesota State
2010	Augustana

Year	School
2011	Augustana
2012	Minnesota State
2013	Minnesota–Duluth; Minnesota State
2014	Minnesota State
2015	Augustana
2016	Minnesota State
2017	Minnesota State
2018	Winona State
2019	Winona State
2020	Cancelled due to the COVID-19 pandemic
2021	Augustana
2022	Augustana
2023	Augustana
2024	Augustana
2025	Augustana
2026	St. Cloud State; Winona State

NSIC Tournament Champions

Year	School
1984	Minnesota–Duluth
1985-1995 (Not Held)
1996	Minnesota–Duluth
1997	Southwest State
1998	Southwest State
1999	Winona State
2000	Minnesota–Duluth
2001	Concordia–St. Paul
2002	Minnesota–Duluth
2003	Winona State
2004	Concordia–St. Paul
2005	Concordia–St. Paul
2006	Concordia–St. Paul
2007	Southwest Minnesota State
2008	Winona State
2009	Winona State
2010	Wayne State
2011	Augustana
2012	Minnesota State
2013	Minnesota State
2014	Winona State
2015	Winona State
2016	Upper Iowa
2017	Minnesota State
2018	Winona State
2019	Augustana
2020	Cancelled due to the COVID-19 pandemic
2021	Minnesota State
2022	Augustana
2023	Minnesota-Duluth
2024	Augustana
2025	Augustana
2025	Augustana

=== Women's Soccer ===
NSIC Championships Per School

School	Conference		Tournament	
School	Titles	Last Title	Titles	Last Title
Winona State	11	2011	6	2010
Minnesota State	9	2026	11	2026
Minnesota-Duluth	5	2003	5	2009
Bemidji State	2	2021	2	2023
Minot State	1	2016	1	2012
Concordia-St. Paul	1	2019	0	N/A
MSU-Moorhead	1	1996	0	N/A
St. Cloud State	1	2023	0	N/A
Mary	1	2026	2	2007
Augustana	0	N/A	1	2015
Northern State	0	N/A	0	N/A
Southwest Minnesota State	0	N/A	0	N/A
Wayne State	0	N/A	0	N/A
Sioux Falls	0	N/A	0	N/A
Minnesota Crookston	0	N/A	0	N/A
Jamestown	0	N/A	0	N/A

1997-2001 Tournament Champion declared NSIC Champion

NSIC All-Time Standings (1996 to 2026)

School	W	L	T	Pct	Tournament		
School	W	L	T	Pct	W	L	T
Minnesota State	211	22	27	.863	36	3	6
Winona State	227	100	29	.678	35	15	2
Augustana	164	64	32	.692	11	15	0
Minot State	119	58	31	.647	8	9	4
Minnesota-Duluth	174	105	40	.609	27	11	2
Bemidji State	193	120	45	.602	16	20	3
St. Cloud State	137	81	42	.608	4	13	3
Mary	138	97	43	.574	11	11	4
Upper Iowa	93	100	27	.484	4	8	1
Northern State	146	153	55	.490	9	18	2
Concordia-St. Paul	144	160	39	.477	7	17	2
Southwest Minnesota State	124	204	30	.388	7	19	1
Minnesota-Morris	16	24	2	.405	2	4	0
Wayne State	106	194	42	.371	9	12	1
MSU-Moorhead	79	246	30	.265	5	10	0
Sioux Falls	36	139	22	.239	0	0	0
Minnesota Crookston	42	266	31	.170	0	4	0
Jamestown	6	19	5	.283	0	0	0

NSIC Champions By Year

The NSIC Tournament was used to determine the NSIC Champion from 1997 to 2001.

Year	School
1996	MSU-Moorhead
1997	Minnesota-Duluth
1998	Minnesota-Duluth
1999	Winona State
2000	Winona State
2001	Minnesota-Duluth
2002	Winona State; Minnesota-Duluth
2003	Minnesota-Duluth
2004	Winona State
2005	Winona State
2006	Winona State
2007	Winona State
2008	Winona State
2009	Winona State
2010	Winona State
2011	Winona State
2012	Minnesota State
2013	Minnesota State
2014	Minnesota State
2015	Minnesota State
2016	Minot State
2017	Minnesota State
2018	Bemidji State
2019	Concordia-St. Paul
2020	Cancelled due to the COVID-19 pandemic
2021	Bemidji State
2022	Minnesota State
2023	St. Cloud State
2024	Minnesota State
2025	Minnesota State
2026	Minnesota State; Mary

=== Women's Tennis ===
NSIC Championships Per School

School	Conference	
School	Titles	Last Title
Augustana	16	2026
Southwest Minnesota State	9	1992
Winona State	8	2007
Minnesota-Duluth	6	2004
St. Cloud State	1	2009
Upper Iowa	1	2008
Bemidji State	1	1999
MSU-Moorhead	0	N/A
Mary	0	N/A
Sioux Falls	0	N/A
Minnesota State	0	N/A
Minnesota Crookston	0	N/A

Before 2007, Tournament Champion determined Team Titles

NSIC Champions By Year

The NSIC Tournament was used to determine the NSIC Champion from 1997 to 2001.

Year	School
1980	St. Cloud State
1981	N/A
1982	St. Cloud State
1983	St. Cloud State
1984	Southwest Minnesota State
1985	Southwest Minnesota State
1986	Southwest Minnesota State
1987	Southwest Minnesota State
1988	Southwest Minnesota State
1989	Southwest Minnesota State
1990	Southwest Minnesota State
1991	Southwest Minnesota State
1992	Southwest Minnesota State
1993	Minnesota Duluth
1994	Winona State
1995	Minnesota Duluth
1996	Minnesota Duluth
1997	Minnesota Duluth
1998	Winona State
1999	Bemidji State
2000	Minnesota Duluth
2001	Winona State
2002	Winona State
2003	Winona State
2004	Minnesota Duluth
2005	Winona State
2006	Winona State
2007	Winona State
2008	Winona State
2009	St. Cloud State
2010	St. Cloud State
2011	Augustana
2012	Augustana
2013	Augustana
2014	Augustana
2015	Augustana
2016	Augustana
2017	Augustana
2018	Augustana
2019	Augustana
2020	Cancelled due to the COVID-19 pandemic
2021	Augustana
2022	Augustana
2023	Augustana
2024	Augustana
2025	Augustana
2026	Augustana

=== Men's Cross Country ===
NSIC Championships Per School

School	Conference	
School	Titles	Last Title
MSU-Moorhead	15	2007
Augustana	16	2026
Minnesota-Duluth	12	2003
Minnesota State	8	2008
Northern State	2	2004
Sioux Falls	1	2018
Winona State	1	1988
Wayne State	1	2005
Mary	0	N/A
Concordia-St. Paul	0	N/A
Minot State	0	N/A
Southwest Minnesota State	0	N/A
Jamestown	0	N/A
Minnesota Crookston	0	N/A

=== Women's Cross Country ===
NSIC Championships Per School

School	Conference	
School	Titles	Last Title
Minnesota-Duluth	15	2015
Augustana	9	2024
MSU-Moorhead	6	2007
Mary	4	2019
Winona State	4	2026
Northern State	2	1986
Bemidji State	2	1989
Wayne State	1	2006
Minot State	0	N/A
Minnesota State	0	N/A
St. Cloud State	0	N/A
Sioux Falls	0	N/A
Concordia-St. Paul	0	N/A
Jamestown	0	N/A
Southwest Minnesota State	0	N/A
Minnesota Crookston	0	N/A

=== Wrestling ===
NSIC Championships Per School

School	Conference	
School	Titles	Last Title
St. Cloud State	19	2025-26
MSU-Moorhead	13	2005
Minnesota State	9	2008-09
Southwest Minnesota State	7	2001
Minnesota-Duluth*	5	1994
Minnesota Morris	4	1982
Winona State*	4	1971
Northern State	3	2020-21
Bemidji State*	3	1976
Upper Iowa	3	2010
Augustana	1	2010-11
Wisconsin-Parkside	1	2022-23
Mary	0	N/A
Minot State	0	N/A
Jamestown	0	N/A

*=No Longer Sponsors Wrestling

=== Men's Golf ===
NSIC Championships Per School

School	Conference	
School	Titles	Last Title
Minnesota State	20	2024
Bemidji State	16	2023
Winona State	16	2026
St. Cloud State	6	2014
Minnesota-Duluth*	4	1985
MSU-Moorhead*	4	1972
Northern State*	1	1991
Concordia-St. Paul	2	2024-25
Minnesota-Morris	1	1996
Michigan Tech	1	1967
Minnesota Crookston	1	2002

*=No Longer Sponsors Men's Golf

=== Women's Golf ===
NSIC Championships Per School

School	Conference	
School	Titles	Last Title
Augustana	13	2024
Southwest Minnesota State	6	2005
Winona State	5	1998
Upper Iowa	2	2007-08
Minnesota-Duluth*	2	1990
Bemidji State	1	1999
Concordia-St. Paul	1	2008-09
Minnesota State	2	2024-25
Wayne State	1	2025-26

=== Men's Indoor Track and Field ===
NSIC Championships Per School

School	Conference	
School	Titles	Last Title
MSU-Moorhead	22	2011
Minnesota State	17	2026
Minnesota-Duluth	10	2004
Northern State	2	2005
Wayne State	2	2007
Bemidji State	1	2000
Mary	1	2008

=== Women's Indoor Track and Field ===
NSIC Championships Per School

School	Conference	
School	Titles	Last Title
Minnesota-Duluth	14	2014
Mary	9	2020
Minnesota State	9	2026
Winona State	2	2006
Northern State	1	1993
Augustana	1	2010
MSU-Moorhead	1	1992

=== Men's Outdoor Track and Field ===
NSIC Championships Per School

School	Conference	
School	Titles	Last Title
Minnesota State	44	2026
MSU-Moorhead	22	2011
Minnesota-Duluth	11	2004
St. Cloud State	6	1971
Wayne State	3	2008
Bemidji State	2	2005
Winona State	2	1935

=== Women's Outdoor Track and Field ===
NSIC Championships Per School

School	Conference	
School	Titles	Last Title
Minnesota-Duluth	14	2009
MSU-Moorhead	9	2006
Mary	10	2021
Minnesota State	7	2026
Northern State	2	1993
Winona State	2	2017
Augustana	1	2011

=== Swimming and Diving ===
NSIC Championships Per School

School	Conference	
School	Titles	Last Title
St. Cloud State	5	2020
Minnesota State	4	2026
Augustana	3	2025

== See also ==
- 2010 NSIC men's basketball tournament
