= Concordia Golden Bears =

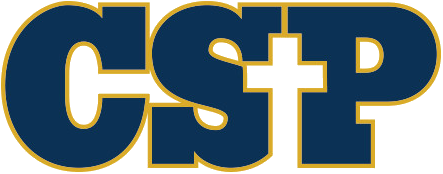
- University: Concordia University, St. Paul
- Conference: NSIC (primary); GLIAC (women's lacrosse)
- NCAA: Division II
- Athletic director: Regan McAthie
- Location: St. Paul, Minnesota
- Varsity teams: 15 (6 men's, 9 women's)
- Football stadium: Sea Foam Stadium
- Basketball arena: Gangelhoff Center
- Baseball stadium: Robert E. Barnes Field
- Softball stadium: Carlander Field
- Soccer stadium: Sea Foam Stadium
- Mascot: Comet
- Nickname: Golden Bears
- Fight song: On Concordia
- Colors: Blue and gold
- Website: cspbears.com

The Concordia Golden Bears are the athletic teams that represent Concordia University, St. Paul in NCAA Division II intercollegiate sports. The Golden Bears compete in the Northern Sun Intercollegiate Conference for 17 varsity sports. The women's lacrosse team participates as an affiliate member of the Great Lakes Intercollegiate Athletic Conference. Prior to 1999 the school's nickname was the Comets.

== Varsity teams ==
Men's sports

- Baseball
- Basketball
- Cross country
- Football
- Golf
- Track and field

Women's sports

- Basketball
- Cross country
- Golf
- Lacrosse
- Soccer
- Softball
- Swimming and diving
- Track and field
- Volleyball

Coed sports

- eSports

== National championships ==
Association	Division	Sport	Year	Opponent	Score
NCAA	Division II	Women's volleyball	2007	Western Washington	3–1
NCAA	Division II	Women's volleyball	2008	Cal State San Bernardino	3–2
NCAA	Division II	Women's volleyball	2009	West Texas A&M	3–0
NCAA	Division II	Women's volleyball	2010	Tampa	3–1
NCAA	Division II	Women's volleyball	2011	Cal State San Bernardino	3–0
NCAA	Division II	Women's volleyball	2012	Tampa	3–2
NCAA	Division II	Women's volleyball	2013	BYU Hawaii	3–0
NCAA	Division II	Women's volleyball	2016	Alaska Anchorage	3–0
NCAA	Division II	Women's volleyball	2017	Florida Southern	3–0

== Individual sports ==
In 2007 the Golden Bears women's volleyball team won the NCAA Division II national title, defeating the Western Washington Vikings 3–1 in the final. In 2008, it followed that victory with another NCAA Division II national title, this time beating Cal State-San Bernardino 3–2. In 2009, it won its third national title, becoming the first NCAA Division I or II team to win three in a row. The Golden Bear volleyball team had a 75-match winning streak from 2008 to 2010. It won its fourth straight national title in 2010, defeating the University of Tampa 3–1. On December 3, 2011, it defeated California State San Bernardino 3–0 for its fifth consecutive title. On December 8, 2012, the Golden Bears dropped the first two sets to the Tampa Spartans but rallied to win 3–2 for their sixth straight national championship. On December 14, 2013, the Golden Bears swept the BYU-Hawaii Seasiders in three straight sets to win their seventh consecutive national championship at the Division II level. This passed the 1991–96 run by Washington University in St. Louis at the Division III level. In 2016 the Golden Bears swept Alaska Anchorage in straight sets to win their 8th title in 10 years. In 2017, the team won its most recent championship with a 3–0 sweep of Florida Southern.
