= Dacotah Bank Stadium =

US football field

Coordinates: 45°26′55″N 98°28′48″W

Dacotah Bank Stadium is an American football field located in Aberdeen, South Dakota. It is home to the Northern State University Wolves football team. The first game played there was on September 11, 2021, between Northern State and the Southwest Minnesota State Mustangs. The Wolves won by a score of 30–13.

In 2022 it also became home to the Roncalli High School football team who, like Northern State, previously played their games at Swisher Field.

== Regional Sports Complex ==
Dacotah Bank Stadium is one of the two new sports stadiums in Northern State University's new regional sports complex, which in total cost $33 million. The complex also includes a new softball stadium.

== Namesake ==
Dacotah Bank is a state-chartered bank mainly located in North Dakota, South Dakota, and Minnesota with select locations in Iowa, Montana, Wyoming, and Nebraska.
