= Northern State Wolves =

College athletic program

- University: Northern State University
- Conference: Northern Sun Intercollegiate Conference
- NCAA: Division II
- Athletic director: Nate Davis
- Location: Aberdeen, South Dakota, U.S.
- Varsity teams: 13
- Football stadium: Dacotah Bank Stadium
- Basketball arena: Wachs Arena
- Baseball stadium: Fossum Field
- Soccer stadium: Northern State Athletic and Recreation Fields
- Mascot: Thunder the Wolf
- Nickname: Wolves
- Colors: Maroon and gold
- Website: nsuwolves.com
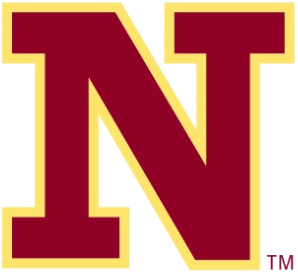

The Northern State Wolves are the athletic teams that represent Northern State University, located in Aberdeen, South Dakota, U.S., in NCAA Division II intercollegiate sports. The Wolves compete as members of the Northern Sun Intercollegiate Conference for all 13 varsity sports. Northern State has been a member of the conference since 1978, and they also have the fifth-smallest enrollment of the 16 member schools. In the 1990s, all members of the NSIC solely became members of NCAA Division II, after spending many years with dual membership with the NAIA.

== Varsity teams ==
=== History ===
The Northern State Wolves compete in 13 inter-collegiate athletics. The athletic program began in 1902 with men's basketball, track and American football followed in 1903, and baseball in 1904. Northern State has had two national championships in women's basketball which occurred in 1992 and 1994. Today, Northern offers men's and women's cross country, men's and women's basketball, men's and women's indoor and outdoor track, women's soccer, women's fastpitch softball, volleyball, American football, wrestling, baseball, and women's swimming.

Northern State athletics are well supported by both the students and the community, as men's and women's basketball as well as football are consistently ranked in the top ten nationally for NCAA Division II attendance. The men's basketball team was ranked number one in the nation in attendance for the 2005–06 season.

Thunder the Wolf serves as the official mascot of the Wolves and of Northern State University. Thunder appears in a variety of sports uniforms and day clothes. Prior to Thunder, the mascot had been known as "Waldo" since the 1950s. However, a dispute with The Walt Disney Company necessitated a change in the name in the early 1990s.

=== List of teams ===
Men's sports

- Baseball
- Basketball
- Cross country
- American football
- Indoor & outdoor track & field
- Wrestling

Women's sports

- Basketball
- Cross country
- Soccer
- Softball
- Swimming & diving
- Indoor & outdoor track & field
- Volleyball

== Individual sports ==
=== Football ===
Northern's football team plays at Dacotah Bank Stadium and are led by head coach Mike Schmidt. Their inaugural season was in 1902 and they have an all-time record of 167–153–2 as of 2021.

=== Men's basketball ===
Wolves head basketball coach Don Meyer coached basketball for over thirty years and over that span amassed a number of awards. He achieved 700 wins faster than any other coach in college history. He began his head coaching career at NCAA Division III Hamline University in Minnesota where he posted a 37–41 record in three years before taking command of Lipscomb in Nashville, Tennessee. In his 24 years at Lipscomb Meyer had a record of 665–179, including a national championship in 1986.

In 1999 Meyer accepted the head coaching position at Northern State, and in his first nine-plus seasons has a record of 201–81. Meyer is third on the all-time win list for four-year college coaches, surpassing legendary coach Bobby Knight on January 10, 2009, with his 903rd victory. Prior to his death, Meyer hosted an annual coaches academy every summer in Aberdeen which brought in college coaches such as the University of Tennessee's Pat Summit, the University of Kansas' Bill Self, the University of Minnesota's Tubby Smith, Gonzaga University's Jerry Krause, and in 2002 the keynote speaker was former UCLA head coach John Wooden.

The Northern State men's basketball team had its best record in school history during the 2017–18 season. Under coach Paul Sather, the Wolves finished 36–4, leading to the first NCAA Division II championship appearance in school history. They fell to Ferris State by a score of 71–69. After the 2018–19 season, Paul Sather stepped down as the head coach, ending a 9-year stint which accumulated a 126–71 record, 2 regular season conference championships, 2 conference tournament championships, and one Central Region championship, and was hired as the head coach for the University of North Dakota and was subsequently replaced by former Ohio University coach, Saul Phillips. In Phillips' first year, the Wolves ended the season 26–6 and won both the regular season conference championship and the conference tournament championship. However, due to the COVID-19 pandemic the national tournament was cancelled.

==== Championships ====
Northern State has won 39 Regular Season Championships, 6 Conference Tournament Championships, and 2 Central Region Tournament Championships

===== South Dakota State Conference =====
- Regular Season Championships (5 times): 1906–07, 1907–08, 1908–09, 1909–10, 1916–17

===== South Dakota Intercollegiate Conference =====
- Regular Season Championships (17 times): 1923–24, 1935–36, 1939–40, 1940–41, 1941–42, 1952–53, 1953–54, 1955–56, 1956–57, 1957–58, 1958–59, 1959–60, 1960–61, 1962–63, 1965–66, 1969–70, 1970–71

===== (Unknown Conference) =====
- Regular Season Championships (3 times): 1974–75, 1975–76, 1977–78

===== Northern Sun Intercollegiate Conference =====
- Regular Season Champions (13 times): 1983–84, 1984–85, 1992–93, 1994–95, 1995–96, 1997–98, 1998–99, 2001–02, 2002–03, 2017–18, 2018–19, 2019–20, 2022–23
- North Division Titles (4 times): 2017–18, 2018–19, 2019–20, 2020–21
- Conference Tournament Champions (6 times): 2004, 2005, 2018, 2019, 2020, 2021

===== NCAA Central Region =====
- Central Region Tournament Championships (2 times): 1998, 2018

=== Women's basketball ===
Long-time women's head basketball coach Curt Fredrickson retired in 2018 after thirty-nine seasons at Northern State, during which time he amassed a career record of 846–306. During his tenure he led the Wolves to two NAIA national championships and numerous conference titles. He has been named the National Coach of the Year twice, as well as being named the Northern Sun Intercollegiate Conference coach of the year. He is one of only four NCAA D-II women's coaches to reach 600 career wins, and he set a national record by leading his Wolves to 45 straight wins from 1993 to 1995. After losing their season opener in the 1993–94 season, his Wolves won 32 straight games to win the national championship and finish the season with a record of 32–1, a school record. Fredrickson was also an All America selection during his baseball career at Northern, and was inducted into the South Dakota Amateur Baseball Hall of Fame. He is the only player in South Dakota amateur baseball history to win 200 games on the mound and hit 200 home runs in a career. Fredrickson was also the head baseball coach at Northern State from 2003 to 2006.

==== Championships ====
Northern State has won 2 National Championships, 8 Regular Season Conference Championships, and 2 Conference Tournaments Championships

===== District Title =====
- District Title (1 time): 1976–77

===== Northern Sun Intercollegiate Conference =====
- Regular Season Champions (7 times): 1987–88, 1991–92, 1993–94, 1994–95, 1996–97, 1997–98, 2017–18
- North Division Champions (4 times): 2013–14, 2014–15, 2015–16, 2017–18
- Conference Tournament Champions (2 times): 2014–15, 2016–17

===== NAIA =====
- National Champions (2 times): 1991–92, 1993–94

=== Softball ===
The Wolves softball team appeared in two Women's College World Series in 1975 and 1976.
