= List of NCAA Division II softball programs =

The following is a list of schools that participate in NCAA Division II softball, according to NCAA.com. These teams compete for the NCAA Division II Softball Championship. (For schools whose athletic branding does not directly correspond with the school name, the athletic branding is in parentheses.)

Conference affiliations reflect those in the 2027 season. Years of conference changes, indicated in footnotes, reflect softball seasons, which take place in the calendar year after a conference change takes effect.

== Division II programs ==
School	Nickname	State	Home field	Conference	National titles
California State Polytechnic University, Humboldt	Lumberjacks	California	Humboldt Softball Field	CCAA	1999, 2008
California State University, Chico	Wildcats	California	Wildcat Softball Field	CCAA	None
California State University, Dominguez Hills	Toros	California	Toro Diamond	CCAA	None
California State University, East Bay	Pioneers	California	Pioneer Softball Field	CCAA	None
California State University, Monterey Bay	Otters	California	Otter Sports Complex	CCAA	None
California State University, San Bernardino	Coyotes	California	CSUSB Softball Park	CCAA	None
California State University San Marcos	Cougars	California	CSUSM Softball Field	CCAA	None
California State University, Stanislaus	Warriors	California	Warrior Softball Field	CCAA	None
Menlo College	Oaks	California	Wunderlich Field	CCAA	None
San Francisco State University	Gators	California	SFSU Softball Field	CCAA	None
University of Bridgeport	Purple Knights	Connecticut	Seaside Park Softball Complex	CACC	None
Caldwell University	Cougars	New Jersey	Caldwell Athletic Fields	CACC	None
Chestnut Hill College	Griffins	Pennsylvania	Chestnut Hill College Softball Field	CACC	None
Dominican University	Chargers	New York	Dominican Softball Field	CACC	None
Felician University	Golden Falcons	New Jersey	Lyndhurst Recreation Complex	CACC	None
Georgian Court University	Lions	New Jersey	GCU Softball Field	CACC	None
Goldey–Beacom College	Lightning	Delaware	Jackson Athletic Complex	CACC	None
Holy Family University	Tigers	Pennsylvania	Bensalem High School	CACC	None
Post University	Eagles	Connecticut	LaMoy Field	CACC	None
Thomas Jefferson University	Rams	Pennsylvania	Jefferson Softball Field	CACC	None
Wilmington University	Wildcats	Delaware	Asbury Field	CACC	None
Bluefield State University	Lady Blues	West Virginia	Graham Rec Field	CIAA	None
Bowie State University	Bulldogs	Maryland	Bulldogs Field	CIAA	None
Claflin University	Panthers	South Carolina	North Road Complex	CIAA	None
Elizabeth City State University	Vikings	North Carolina	South Park Athletic Complex	CIAA	None
Fayetteville State University	Lady Broncos	North Carolina	Lamon Street Park	CIAA	None
Johnson C. Smith University	Lady Golden Bulls	North Carolina	Biddleville Park	CIAA	None
Lincoln University	Lions	Pennsylvania	LU Softball Complex	CIAA	None
Livingstone College	Blue Bears	North Carolina	Jaycee Optimist Park	CIAA	None
St. Augustine's University	Falcons	North Carolina	Walnut Creek Softball Complex	CIAA	None
Shaw University	Bears	North Carolina	Worthdale Park	CIAA	None
Virginia State University	Trojans	Virginia	VSU Softball Field	CIAA	None
Virginia Union University	Panthers	Virginia	VUU Softball Field	CIAA	None
Winston-Salem State University	Rams	North Carolina	Twin City Field	CIAA	None
Barton College	Bulldogs	North Carolina	Jeffries Field	Conference Carolinas	None
Belmont Abbey College	Crusaders	North Carolina	Crusader Field	Conference Carolinas	None
Chowan University	Hawks	North Carolina	CU Softball Field	Conference Carolinas	None
Converse University	Valkyries	South Carolina	Tyger River Park	Conference Carolinas	None
Emmanuel University	Lions	Georgia	Emmanuel Campus Softball Complex	Conference Carolinas	None
Erskine College	Flying Fleet	South Carolina	Erskine Softball Complex	Conference Carolinas	None
Ferrum College	Panthers	Virginia	Vickie Van Kleeck Softball Complex	Conference Carolinas	None
Francis Marion University	Patriots	South Carolina	FMU Softball Stadium	Conference Carolinas	None
King University	Tornado	Tennessee	King Softball Field	Conference Carolinas	None
Lees–McRae College	Bobcats	North Carolina	Lees–McRae Softball Field	Conference Carolinas	None
University of Mount Olive	Trojans	North Carolina	Nancy Chapman Cassell Field	Conference Carolinas	None
North Greenville University	Crusaders	South Carolina	Jan McDonald Field	Conference Carolinas	None
Shorter University	Hawks	Georgia	Alto Park Softball Complex	Conference Carolinas	None
Southern Wesleyan University	Warriors	South Carolina	Varsity Field	Conference Carolinas	None
University of North Carolina at Pembroke	Braves	North Carolina	UNCP Softball Field	Conference Carolinas	None
Young Harris College	Mountain Lions	Georgia	YHC Softball Field	Conference Carolinas	None
D'Youville University	Saints	New York	Dobson Field	East Coast	None
Mercy University	Mavericks	New York	Smith Field	East Coast	None
Molloy University	Lions	New York	Rockville Centre Sports Complex	East Coast	None
Queens College, City University of New York	Knights	New York	Queens College Softball Field	East Coast	None
St. Thomas Aquinas College	Spartans	New York	Spartan Field	East Coast	None
College of Staten Island	Dolphins	New York	CSI Softball Complex	East Coast	None
Arkansas Tech University	Golden Suns	Arkansas	Chartwells Women's Sports Complex	Great American	None
University of Arkansas at Monticello	Cotton Blossoms	Arkansas	Alvy Early Softball Field	Great American	None
East Central University	Tigers	Oklahoma	Tiger Field	Great American	None
Harding University	Bisons	Arkansas	HU Softball Field	Great American	None
Henderson State University	Reddies	Arkansas	Dee White Field	Great American	None
Northwestern Oklahoma State University	Rangers	Oklahoma	Alva Recreation Complex	Great American	None
Oklahoma Baptist University	Bison	Oklahoma	Bison Softball Park	Great American	None
Ouachita Baptist University	Tigers	Arkansas	Sully Anderson Field	Great American	None
Southeastern Oklahoma State University	Savage Storm	Oklahoma	Southeastern Oklahoma Softball Field	Great American	None
Southern Arkansas University	Muleriders	Arkansas	Dawson Field	Great American	None
Southern Nazarene University	Crimson Storm	Oklahoma	Tere Webber Field	Great American	None
Southwestern Oklahoma State University	Bulldogs	Oklahoma	SWOSU Athletic Complex	Great American	None
Davenport University	Panthers	Michigan	Farmers Insurance Athletic Complex	GLIAC	None
Ferris State University	Bulldogs	Michigan	FSU Softball Field	GLIAC	None
Grand Valley State University	Lakers	Michigan	GVSU Softball Field	GLIAC	None
Purdue University Northwest	Pride	Indiana	PNW Softball Field	GLIAC	None
Roosevelt University	Lakers	Illinois	Ballpark at Rosemont	GLIAC	None
Saginaw Valley State University	Cardinals	Michigan	SVSU Softball Complex	GLIAC	None
Wayne State University	Warriors	Michigan	WSU Softball Stadium	GLIAC	None
University of Wisconsin–Parkside	Rangers	Wisconsin	Case Softball Complex	GLIAC	None
Drury University	Panthers	Missouri	Thompson Field at Meador Park	GLVC	None
University of Illinois Springfield	Prairie Stars	Illinois	Land of Lincoln Softball Complex	GLVC	None
University of Indianapolis	Greyhounds	Indiana	Baumgartner Field	GLVC	None
Lewis University	Flyers	Illinois	Lewis Softball Field	GLVC	None
Lincoln University	Blue Tigers	Missouri	Battle Softball Field	GLVC	None
Maryville University	Saints	Missouri	New Maryville Softball Field	GLVC	None
McKendree University	Bearcats	Illinois	Bearcat Field	GLVC	None
Missouri University of Science and Technology	Miners	Missouri	S&T Softball Field	GLVC	None
University of Missouri–St. Louis	Tritons	Missouri	UMSL Softball Field	GLVC	None
Quincy University	Hawks	Illinois	Mart Heinen Softball Complex	GLVC	None
Rockhurst University	Hawks	Missouri	Loyola Park Softball Field	GLVC	None
Southwest Baptist University	Bearcats	Missouri	SBU Softball Field	GLVC	None
Truman State University	Bulldogs	Missouri	Bulldog Softball Park	GLVC	None
Upper Iowa University	Peacocks	Iowa	Eischeid Softball Complex	GLVC	None
William Jewell College	Cardinals	Missouri	Cardinal Field	GLVC	None
Ashland University	Eagles	Ohio	Brookside Park	G-MAC	None
Cedarville University	Yellow Jackets	Ohio	Lady Jacket Field	G-MAC	None
University of Findlay	Oilers	Ohio	Anderson Field	G-MAC	None
Hillsdale College	Chargers	Michigan	Johnny Williams Field	G-MAC	None
Kentucky Wesleyan College	Panthers	Kentucky	Foster Field	G-MAC	None
Lake Erie College	Storm	Ohio	Diamond 9 at Rec Park	G-MAC	None
Malone University	Pioneers	Ohio	Pioneer Field	G-MAC	None
Northwood University	Timberwolves	Michigan	Fisher Stadium	G-MAC	None
Ohio Dominican University	Panthers	Ohio	Panther Softball Field	G-MAC	None
Thomas More University	Saints	Kentucky	Thomas More Field	G-MAC	None
Tiffin University	Dragons	Ohio	Tiffin University Softball Field	G-MAC	None
Ursuline College	Arrows	Ohio	Ursuline Softball Field	G-MAC	None
Walsh University	Cavaliers	Ohio	WU Softball Complex	G-MAC	None
Central Washington University	Wildcats	Washington	Gary & Bobbi Frederick Field	GNAC	None
Montana State University Billings	Yellowjackets	Montana	Avitus Group Stadium	GNAC	None
Northwest Nazarene University	Nighthawks	Idaho	Bobby Welch Halle Field	GNAC	None
Saint Martin's University	Saints	Washington	SMU Softball Field	GNAC	None
Simon Fraser University	Athletics	British Columbia	Beedie Field	GNAC	None
Western Oregon University	Wolves	Oregon	WOU Softball Field	GNAC	None
Western Washington University	Vikings	Washington	Viking Field	GNAC	None
University of Alabama in Huntsville	Chargers	Alabama	Charger Park	Gulf South	None
Auburn University at Montgomery	Warhawks	Alabama	AUM Softball Complex	Gulf South	None
Christian Brothers University	Lady Buccaneers	Tennessee	Bland Field	Gulf South	None
Delta State University	Lady Statesmen	Mississippi	University Field	Gulf South	None
Lee University	Flames	Tennessee	Butler Field	Gulf South	None
Mississippi Christian University	Choctaws	Mississippi	MC Softball Complex	Gulf South	None
University of Montevallo	Falcons	Alabama	Montevallo Softball Stadium at Orr Park	Gulf South	None
Trevecca Nazarene University	Trojans	Tennessee	Trojan Softball Complex	Gulf South	None
Union University	Bulldogs	Tennessee	Fesmire Softball Field	Gulf South	None
Valdosta State University	Blazers	Georgia	Steel's Diamond	Gulf South	2012
University of West Alabama	Tigers	Alabama	UWA Softball Complex	Gulf South	None
Salem University	Tigers	West Virginia	Hope Field	Independent	None
Angelo State University	Rambelles	Texas	Mayer Stadium	Lone Star	2004
Cameron University	Aggies	Oklahoma	McMahon Field	Lone Star	None
Eastern New Mexico University	Greyhounds	New Mexico	Greyhound Softball Field	Lone Star	None
Lubbock Christian University	Lady Chaps	Texas	Maner Park	Lone Star	None
Midwestern State University	Mustangs	Texas	Mustangs Park	Lone Star	None
Oklahoma Christian University	Lady Eagles	Oklahoma	Tom Heath Field at Lawson Plaza	Lone Star	None
St. Edward's University	Hilltoppers	Texas	Diane Daniels Field	Lone Star	None
St. Mary's University	Rattlers	Texas	St. Mary's Softball Stadium	Lone Star	2002
Sul Ross State University	Lobos	Texas	Lobo Softball Field	Lone Star	None
Texas A&M International University	Dustdevils	Texas	Dustdevil Softball Field	Lone Star	None
Texas A&M University–Kingsville	Javelinas	Texas	Vernie and Blanche Hubert Field	Lone Star	None
University of Texas Permian Basin	Falcons	Texas	UTPB Softball Field	Lone Star	None
Texas Woman's University	Pioneers	Texas	Dianne Baker Field	Lone Star	None
University of Texas at Dallas	Comets	Texas	UTD Softball Field	Lone Star	None
University of Texas at Tyler	Patriots	Texas	UT Tyler Softball Field	Lone Star	None
West Texas A&M University	Buffaloes	Texas	Schaeffer Park	Lone Star	2014, 2021
Western New Mexico University	Mustangs	New Mexico	Mustang Field	Lone Star	None
University of Central Missouri	Jennies	Missouri	South Recreation Complex	MIAA	None
University of Central Oklahoma	Bronchos	Oklahoma	Gerry Pinkston Stadium	MIAA	2013
Emporia State University	Hornets	Kansas	Turnbull Field	MIAA	None
Fort Hays State University	Tigers	Kansas	Tiger Stadium	MIAA	None
Missouri Southern State University	Lions	Missouri	Pat Lipira Softball Complex	MIAA	1992
Missouri Western State University	Griffons	Missouri	Griffon Softball Field	MIAA	None
University of Nebraska at Kearney	Lopers	Nebraska	Patriot Park	MIAA	None
Newman University (Kansas)	Jets	Kansas	Newman Softball Field	MIAA	None
Northeastern State University	RiverHawks	Oklahoma	RiverHawks Park	MIAA	None
Northwest Missouri State University	Bearcats	Missouri	Bearcat Softball Field	MIAA	None
Pittsburg State University	Gorillas	Kansas	PSU Softball Field	MIAA	None
Rogers State University	Hillcats	Oklahoma	Hillcat Softball Field	MIAA	2022
Washburn University	Ichabods	Kansas	Gahnstrom Field	MIAA	None
University of Charleston	Golden Eagles	West Virginia	UC Softball Field	Mountain East	None
Concord University	Mountain Lions	West Virginia	CU Softball Field	Mountain East	None
Davis & Elkins College	Senators	West Virginia	Joni Smith Field	Mountain East	None
Fairmont State University	Fighting Falcons	West Virginia	Duvall-Rosier Field	Mountain East	None
Frostburg State University	Bobcats	Maryland	Bobcat Field	Mountain East	None
Glenville State University	Pioneers	West Virginia	Sue Morris Sports Complex	Mountain East	None
Point Park University	Pioneers	Pennsylvania	Fairhaven Park	Mountain East	None
Shawnee State University	Bears	Ohio	Doc Singleton Park	Mountain East	None
West Liberty University	Hilltoppers	West Virginia	Hilltopper Softball Complex	Mountain East	None
West Virginia State University	Yellow Jackets	West Virginia	Lady Jackets Field	Mountain East	None
West Virginia Wesleyan College	Bobcats	West Virginia	Culpepper Field	Mountain East	None
Wheeling University	Cardinals	West Virginia	JB Chambers I-470 Complex	Mountain East	None
Adelphi University	Panthers	New York	Janet L. Ficke Field	Northeast-10	None
American International College	Yellow Jackets	Massachusetts	Judy Groff Field	Northeast-10	None
Assumption University	Greyhounds	Massachusetts	Marois Field	Northeast-10	None
Bentley University	Falcons	Massachusetts	Bentley Softball Field	Northeast-10	None
Franklin Pierce University	Ravens	New Hampshire	Melissa Bisaccia Memorial Softball Complex	Northeast-10	None
Pace University	Setters	New York	Pace Softball Field	Northeast-10	None
Saint Anselm College	Hawks	New Hampshire	South Athletic Fields	Northeast-10	None
Saint Michael's College	Purple Knights	Vermont	Doc Jacobs Field	Northeast-10	None
Southern Connecticut State University	Owls	Connecticut	Pelz Field	Northeast-10	None
Southern New Hampshire University	Penmen	New Hampshire	SNHU Softball Field	Northeast-10	None
Augustana University	Vikings	South Dakota	Bowden Field	NSIC	1991, 2019
Bemidji State University	Beavers	Minnesota	BSU Softball Field	NSIC	None
Concordia University	Golden Bears	Minnesota	Carlander Field	NSIC	None
University of Jamestown	Jimmies	North Dakota	Trapper Field	NSIC	None
University of Mary	Marauders	North Dakota	University of Mary Softball Field	NSIC	None
Minnesota State University, Mankato	Mavericks	Minnesota	MSU Softball Complex	NSIC	2017
Minnesota State University Moorhead	Dragons	Minnesota	Nemzek Softball Field	NSIC	None
University of Minnesota Crookston	Golden Eagles	Minnesota	UMC Softball Field	NSIC	None
University of Minnesota Duluth	Bulldogs	Minnesota	Junction Field	NSIC	None
Minot State University	Beavers	North Dakota	South Hill Softball Complex	NSIC	None
Northern State University	Wolves	South Dakota	Koehler Hall of Fame Field	NSIC	None
St. Cloud State University	Huskies	Minnesota	Selke Field	NSIC	None
University of Sioux Falls	Cougars	South Dakota	Sherman Park	NSIC	None
Southwest Minnesota State University	Mustangs	Minnesota	Mustang Field	NSIC	None
Wayne State College	Wildcats	Nebraska	Pete Chapman Softball Complex	NSIC	None
Winona State University	Warriors	Minnesota	Maynard R. Johnson Field	NSIC	None
Biola University	Eagles	California	Freedom Field	Pacific West	None
Chaminade University of Honolulu	Silverswords	Hawaii	Patsy T. Mink Central Oʻahu Regional Park	Pacific West	None
Concordia University Irvine	Eagles	California	Eagles Field	Pacific West	None
Dominican University of California	Penguins	California	Penguin Field	Pacific West	None
University of Hawaii at Hilo	Vulcans	Hawaii	UHH Softball Field	Pacific West	None
Hawaii Pacific University	Sharks	Hawaii	Howard A. Okita Field	Pacific West	2010
Jessup University	Warriors	California	Various	Pacific West	None
Vanguard University	Lions	California	VU Softball Field	Pacific West	None
Augusta University	Jaguars	Georgia	Jaguar Field	Peach Belt	None
Columbus State University	Cougars	Georgia	Cougar Field	Peach Belt	None
Flagler College	Saints	Florida	Flagler Field	Peach Belt	None
Georgia College & State University	Bobcats	Georgia	Peeler Complex	Peach Belt	None
Georgia Southwestern State University	Hurricanes	Georgia	Lady Canes Softball Field	Peach Belt	None
Lander University	Bearcats	South Carolina	Doug Spears Field	Peach Belt	None
Middle Georgia State University	Knights	Georgia	Stuckey Field	Peach Belt	None
University of North Georgia	Nighthawks	Georgia	Haines & Carolyn Hill Stadium	Peach Belt	2015, 2023
University of South Carolina Aiken	Pacers	South Carolina	J.H. Satcher Field	Peach Belt	None
University of South Carolina Beaufort	Sand Sharks	South Carolina	J.H. Satcher Field	Peach Belt	None
Commonwealth University-Bloomsburg	Huskies	Pennsylvania	Jan M. Hutchinson Field	PSAC	None
Commonwealth University-Lock Haven	Bald Eagles	Pennsylvania	Lawrence Field	PSAC	2006, 2009
Commonwealth University-Mansfield	Mountaineers	Pennsylvania	Helen Lutes Field	PSAC	None
East Stroudsburg University of Pennsylvania	Warriors	Pennsylvania	Creekview Park	PSAC	None
Gannon University	Golden Knights	Pennsylvania	McConnell Family Stadium	PSAC	None
Indiana University of Pennsylvania	Crimson Hawks	Pennsylvania	Ruth Podbielski Field	PSAC	None
Kutztown University of Pennsylvania	Golden Bears	Pennsylvania	North Campus Field	PSAC	None
Millersville University of Pennsylvania	Marauders	Pennsylvania	Seaber Softball Stadium	PSAC	None
PennWest California	Vulcans	Pennsylvania	Lilley Field	PSAC	1997, 1998
PennWest Clarion	Golden Eagles	Pennsylvania	Memorial Stadium	PSAC	None
PennWest Edinboro	Fighting Scots	Pennsylvania	Edinboro Softball Field	PSAC	None
University of Pittsburgh at Johnstown	Mountain Cats	Pennsylvania	V.E. Erickson Complex	PSAC	None
Seton Hill University	Griffins	Pennsylvania	SHU Softball Complex	PSAC	None
Shepherd University	Rams	West Virginia	Sara Cree Field	PSAC	None
Shippensburg University of Pennsylvania	Raiders	Pennsylvania	Robb Field	PSAC	None
Slippery Rock University of Pennsylvania	The Rock	Pennsylvania	SRU Softball Complex	PSAC	None
West Chester University	Golden Rams	Pennsylvania	West Chester University Softball Field	PSAC	None
Adams State University	Grizzlies	Colorado	ASU Softball Field	RMAC	None
Black Hills State University	Yellow Jackets	South Dakota	Yellow Jacket Field	RMAC	None
Chadron State College	Eagles	Nebraska	CSC Softball Field	RMAC	None
Colorado Christian University	Cougars	Colorado	All Star Park	RMAC	None
Colorado Mesa University	Mavericks	Colorado	CMU Softball Field	RMAC	None
Colorado School of Mines	Orediggers	Colorado	Joe Coors Jr. Softball Field	RMAC	None
Colorado State University Pueblo	ThunderWolves	Colorado	Rawlings Softball Complex	RMAC	None
University of Colorado Colorado Springs	Mountain Lions	Colorado	Mountain Lion Field	RMAC	None
Fort Lewis College	Skyhawks	Colorado	Aspen Field	RMAC	None
Metropolitan State University of Denver	Roadrunners	Colorado	The Assembly Athletic Complex	RMAC	None
New Mexico Highlands University	Cowgirls	New Mexico	Brandt Field	RMAC	None
Regis University	Rangers	Colorado	Regis Softball Field	RMAC	None
Anderson University	Trojans	South Carolina	AU Softball Complex	South Atlantic	None
Carson–Newman University	Eagles	Tennessee	The Vick	South Atlantic	None
Catawba College	Indians	North Carolina	Whitley Softball Field	South Atlantic	None
Coker University	Cobras	South Carolina	Saleeby-Stokes Field	South Atlantic	None
Emory and Henry University	Wasps	Virginia	Wasps Field	South Atlantic	None
Lenoir–Rhyne University	Bears	North Carolina	Bears Field	South Atlantic	None
Lincoln Memorial University	Railsplitters	Tennessee	Dorothy Neely Softball Complex	South Atlantic	None
Mars Hill University	Lions	North Carolina	Ponder Field	South Atlantic	None
Newberry College	Wolves	South Carolina	Smith Road Complex	South Atlantic	None
Tusculum University	Pioneers	Tennessee	J. C. "Red" Edmonds Softball Field	South Atlantic	None
University of Virginia's College at Wise	Cavaliers	Virginia	Cavalier Field	South Atlantic	None
Wingate University	Bulldogs	North Carolina	Wingate Softball Complex	South Atlantic	None
Albany State University	Golden Rams	Georgia	Golden Rams' Field	SIAC	None
Allen University	Yellow Jackets	South Carolina	Tiger Field	SIAC	None
Benedict College	Tigers	South Carolina	Tiger Field	SIAC	None
Clark Atlanta University	Panthers	Georgia	Lady Panthers Field	SIAC	None
Edward Waters University	Tigers	Florida	J. Gardner "Nip" Sams Softball Park	SIAC	None
Fort Valley State University	Wildcats	Georgia	Lady Wildcats Softball Field	SIAC	None
Kentucky State University	Thorobrettes	Kentucky	State Stadium	SIAC	None
Lane College	Dragons	Tennessee	West Tennessee Sportsplex	SIAC	None
LeMoyne–Owen College	Magicians	Tennessee	Tobey Field	SIAC	None
Miles College	Golden Bears	Alabama	Miles Field	SIAC	None
Savannah State University	Lady Tigers	Georgia	Lady Tiger Field	SIAC	None
Spring Hill College	Badgers	Alabama	Murray Field	SIAC	None
Tuskegee University	Golden Tigers	Alabama	Tuskegee Softball Field	SIAC	None
Barry University	Buccaneers	Florida	Buccaneer Softball Field	Sunshine State	None
Eckerd College	Tritons	Florida	Turley Athletic Complex	Sunshine State	None
Embry–Riddle Aeronautical University, Daytona Beach	Eagles	Florida	Radiology Associates Field	Sunshine State	None
Florida Southern College	Moccasins	Florida	Chris Bellotto Field	Sunshine State	1993
Florida Institute of Technology	Panthers	Florida	Nancy Bottge Field	Sunshine State	None
Lynn University	Fighting Knights	Florida	Lynn Softball Complex	Sunshine State	2005
Nova Southeastern University	Sharks	Florida	AD Griffin Sports Complex	Sunshine State	None
Palm Beach Atlantic University	Sailfish	Florida	Simpson Field	Sunshine State	None
Rollins College	Tars	Florida	Rollins Softball Stadium	Sunshine State	None
Saint Leo University	Lions	Florida	University Softball Stadium	Sunshine State	None
University of Tampa	Spartans	Florida	Naimoli Stadium	Sunshine State	None

== Future programs ==
School	Nickname	State	Home field	Future conference	Begins play	National titles
Lackawanna College	Falcons	Pennsylvania	Scranton High School	PSAC	2028	None
Monroe University	Mustangs	New York	Flowers Park Softball Field	CACC	2028	None
Texas A&M University–Texarkana	Eagles	Texas	Bramlett Field	Lone Star	2028	None
Texas Wesleyan University	Rams	Texas	Sycamore Park	Lone Star	2029	None

== See also ==
- List of NCAA Division II institutions
- List of NCAA Division I softball programs
- List of NCAA Division III softball programs
- List of NCAA Division II football programs
- List of NCAA Division II baseball programs
- List of NCAA Division II lacrosse programs
- List of NCAA Division II men's soccer programs
- List of NCAA Division II women's soccer programs
- List of NCAA Division II men's wrestling programs
- List of NCAA Division II men's basketball programs
- List of junior college softball programs
