= List of NCAA Division II men's basketball programs =

The following is a list of schools that participate in NCAA Division II basketball.

Conference affiliations are accurate as of the 2026–27 basketball season.

== Division II programs ==
Team	City	State/Province	Conference
Adams State	Alamosa	Colorado	RMAC
Adelphi	Garden City	New York	NE-10
Alabama–Huntsville	Huntsville	Alabama	GSC
Alaska Anchorage	Anchorage	Alaska	GNAC
Alaska Fairbanks	Fairbanks	Alaska	GNAC
Albany State	Albany	Georgia	SIAC
Allen	Columbia	South Carolina	SIAC
American International	Springfield	Massachusetts	NE-10
Anderson	Anderson	South Carolina	SAC
Angelo State	San Angelo	Texas	LSC
Arkansas–Fort Smith	Fort Smith	Arkansas	MIAA
Arkansas–Monticello	Monticello	Arkansas	GAC
Arkansas Tech	Russellville	Arkansas	GAC
Ashland	Ashland	Ohio	G-MAC
Assumption	Worcester	Massachusetts	NE-10
Auburn Montgomery	Montgomery	Alabama	GSC
Augusta	Augusta	Georgia	PBC
Augustana	Sioux Falls	South Dakota	NSIC
Azusa Pacific	Azusa	California	PacWest
Barry	Miami	Florida	Sunshine State
Barton	Wilson	North Carolina	Carolinas
Belmont Abbey	Belmont	North Carolina	Carolinas
Bemidji State	Bemidji	Minnesota	NSIC
Benedict	Columbia	South Carolina	SIAC
Bentley	Waltham	Massachusetts	NE-10
Biola	La Mirada	California	PacWest
Black Hills State	Spearfish	South Dakota	RMAC
Bloomsburg	Bloomsburg	Pennsylvania	PSAC
Bluefield State	Bluefield	West Virginia	CIAA
Bowie State	Bowie	Maryland	CIAA
Bridgeport	Bridgeport	Connecticut	CACC
Caldwell	Caldwell	New Jersey	CACC
California (PA)	California	Pennsylvania	PSAC
Cal Poly Humboldt	Arcata	California	CCAA
Cal Poly Pomona	Pomona	California	CCAA
Cal State Dominguez Hills	Carson	California	CCAA
Cal State East Bay	Hayward	California	CCAA
Cal State Los Angeles	Los Angeles	California	CCAA
Cal State Monterey Bay	Seaside	California	CCAA
Cal State San Bernardino	San Bernardino	California	CCAA
Cal State San Marcos	San Marcos	California	CCAA
Cal State Stanislaus	Turlock	California	CCAA
Cameron	Lawton	Oklahoma	LSC
Carson–Newman	Jefferson City	Tennessee	SAC
Catawba	Salisbury	North Carolina	SAC
Cedarville	Cedarville	Ohio	G-MAC
Central Missouri	Warrensburg	Missouri	MIAA
Central Oklahoma	Edmond	Oklahoma	MIAA
Central State	Wilberforce	Ohio	SIAC
Central Washington	Ellensburg	Washington	GNAC
Chadron State	Chadron	Nebraska	RMAC
Chaminade	Honolulu	Hawaii	PacWest
Charleston	Charleston	West Virginia	MEC
Chestnut Hill	Philadelphia	Pennsylvania	CACC
Chico State	Chico	California	CCAA
Chowan	Murfreesboro	North Carolina	Carolinas
Christian Brothers	Memphis	Tennessee	GSC
Claflin	Orangeburg	South Carolina	CIAA
Clarion	Clarion	Pennsylvania	PSAC
Clark Atlanta	Atlanta	Georgia	SIAC
Clayton State	Morrow	Georgia	PBC
Coker	Hartsville	South Carolina	SAC
Colorado Christian	Lakewood	Colorado	RMAC
Colorado Mesa	Grand Junction	Colorado	RMAC
Colorado Mines	Golden	Colorado	RMAC
CSU Pueblo	Pueblo	Colorado	RMAC
Columbus State	Columbus	Georgia	PBC
Concord	Athens	West Virginia	MEC
Concordia–Irvine	Irvine	California	PacWest
Concordia–St. Paul	Saint Paul	Minnesota	NSIC
Converse	Spartanburg	South Carolina	Carolinas
D'Youville	Buffalo	New York	ECC
Daemen	Amherst	New York	ECC
Dallas Baptist	Dallas	Texas	LSC
Davenport	Grand Rapids	Michigan	GLIAC
Davis & Elkins	Elkins	West Virginia	MEC
Delta State	Cleveland	Mississippi	GSC
Dominican (CA)	San Rafael	California	PacWest
Dominican (NY)	Orangeburg	New York	CACC
Drury	Springfield	Missouri	GLVC
East Central	Ada	Oklahoma	GAC
East Stroudsburg	East Stroudsburg	Pennsylvania	PSAC
Eastern New Mexico	Portales	New Mexico	LSC
Eckerd	St. Petersburg	Florida	Sunshine State
Edinboro	Edinboro	Pennsylvania	PSAC
Edward Waters	Jacksonville	Florida	SIAC
Elizabeth City State	Elizabeth City	North Carolina	CIAA
Embry–Riddle	Daytona Beach	Florida	Sunshine State
Emmanuel	Franklin Springs	Georgia	Carolinas
Emory & Henry	Emory	Virginia	SAC
Emporia State	Emporia	Kansas	MIAA
Erskine	Due West	South Carolina	Carolinas
Fairmont State	Fairmont	West Virginia	MEC
Fayetteville State	Fayetteville	North Carolina	CIAA
Felician	Lodi	New Jersey	CACC
Ferris State	Big Rapids	Michigan	GLIAC
Ferrum	Ferrum	Virginia	Carolinas
Findlay	Findlay	Ohio	G-MAC
Flagler	St. Augustine	Florida	PBC
Florida Southern	Lakeland	Florida	Sunshine State
Florida Tech	Melbourne	Florida	Sunshine State
Fort Hays State	Hays	Kansas	MIAA
Fort Lewis	Durango	Colorado	RMAC
Fort Valley State	Fort Valley	Georgia	SIAC
Francis Marion	Florence	South Carolina	Carolinas
Franklin Pierce	Rindge	New Hampshire	NE-10
Fresno Pacific	Fresno	California	CCAA
Frostburg State	Frostburg	Maryland	MEC
Gannon	Erie	Pennsylvania	PSAC
Georgia College	Milledgeville	Georgia	PBC
Georgia Southwestern State	Americus	Georgia	PBC
Georgian Court	Lakewood	New Jersey	CACC
Glenville State	Glenville	West Virginia	MEC
Goldey–Beacom	Wilmington	Delaware	CACC
Grand Valley State	Allendale	Michigan	GLIAC
Harding	Searcy	Arkansas	GAC
Hawaiʻi–Hilo	Hilo	Hawaii	PacWest
Hawaii Pacific	Honolulu	Hawaii	PacWest
Henderson State	Arkladelphia	Arkansas	GAC
Hillsdale	Hillsdale	Michigan	G-MAC
Holy Family	Philadelphia	Pennsylvania	CACC
Illinois–Springfield	Springfield	Illinois	GLVC
Indiana (PA)	Indiana	Pennsylvania	PSAC
Indianapolis	Indianapolis	Indiana	GLVC
Jamestown	Jamestown	North Dakota	NSIC
Jefferson (Thomas Jefferson)	Philadelphia	Pennsylvania	CACC
Jessup	Rocklin	California	PacWest
Johnson C. Smith	Charlotte	North Carolina	CIAA
Kentucky State	Frankfort	Kentucky	SIAC
Kentucky Wesleyan	Owensboro	Kentucky	G-MAC
King	Bristol	Tennessee	Carolinas
Kutztown	Kutztown	Pennsylvania	PSAC
Lake Erie	Painesville	Ohio	G-MAC
Lake Superior State	Sault Ste. Marie	Michigan	GLIAC
Lander	Greenwood	South Carolina	PBC
Lane	Jackson	Tennessee	SIAC
Lee	Cleveland	Tennessee	GSC
Lees–McRae	Banner Elk	North Carolina	Carolinas
LeMoyne–Owen	Memphis	Tennessee	SIAC
Lenoir–Rhyne	Hickory	North Carolina	SAC
Lewis	Romeoville	Illinois	GLVC
Lincoln Memorial	Harrogate	Tennessee	SAC
Lincoln (MO)	Jefferson City	Missouri	GLVC
Lincoln (PA)	Oxford	Pennsylvania	CIAA
Livingstone	Salisbury	North Carolina	CIAA
Lock Haven	Lock Haven	Pennsylvania	PSAC
Lubbock Christian	Lubbock	Texas	LSC
Lynn	Boca Raton	Florida	Sunshine State
Malone	Canton	Ohio	G-MAC
Mansfield	Mansfield	Pennsylvania	PSAC
Mars Hill	Mars Hill	North Carolina	SAC
Mary	Bismarck	North Dakota	NSIC
Maryville	St. Louis	Missouri	GLVC
McKendree	Lebanon	Illinois	GLVC
Menlo	Atherton	California	CCAA
Mercy	Dobbs Ferry	New York	ECC
Metropolitan State	Denver	Colorado	RMAC
Michigan Tech	Houghton	Michigan	GLIAC
Middle Georgia	Cochran (Note: Middle Georgia's main campus is in Macon; the men's basketball team competes on the Cochran campus.)	Georgia	PBC
Midwestern State	Wichita Falls	Texas	LSC
Miles	Fairfield	Alabama	SIAC
Millersville	Millersville	Pennsylvania	PSAC
Minnesota–Crookston	Crookston	Minnesota	NSIC
Minnesota–Duluth	Duluth	Minnesota	NSIC
Minnesota State	Mankato	Minnesota	NSIC
Minnesota State–Moorhead	Moorhead	Minnesota	NSIC
Minot State	Minot	North Dakota	NSIC
Mississippi Christian	Clinton	Mississippi	GSC
Missouri Southern	Joplin	Missouri	MIAA
Missouri S&T	Rolla	Missouri	GLVC
Missouri Western	St. Joseph	Missouri	MIAA
Molloy	Rockville Centre	New York	ECC
Montana State–Billings	Billings	Montana	GNAC
Montevallo	Montevallo	Alabama	GSC
Morehouse	Atlanta	Georgia	SIAC
Mount Olive	Mount Olive	North Carolina	Carolinas
New Mexico Highlands	Las Vegas	New Mexico	RMAC
Nebraska–Kearney	Kearney	Nebraska	MIAA
Newberry	Newberry	South Carolina	SAC
Newman	Wichita	Kansas	MIAA
North Georgia	Dahlonega	Georgia	PBC
North Greenville	Tigerville	South Carolina	Carolinas
Northeastern State	Tahlequah	Oklahoma	MIAA
Northern Michigan	Marquette	Michigan	GLIAC
Northern State	Aberdeen	South Dakota	NSIC
Northwest Missouri State	Maryville	Missouri	MIAA
Northwest Nazarene	Nampa	Idaho	GNAC
Northwestern Oklahoma State	Alva	Oklahoma	GAC
Northwood	Midland	Michigan	G-MAC
Nova Southeastern	Fort Lauderdale	Florida	Sunshine State
Ohio Dominican	Columbus	Ohio	G-MAC
Oklahoma Baptist	Shawnee	Oklahoma	GAC
Oklahoma Christian	Edmond	Oklahoma	LSC
Ouachita Baptist	Arkladelphia	Arkansas	GAC
Pace	New York	New York	NE-10
Palm Beach Atlantic	West Palm Beach	Florida	Sunshine State
Parkside (Wisconsin–Parkside)	Kenosha	Wisconsin	GLIAC
Pittsburg State	Pittsburg	Kansas	MIAA
Pittsburgh–Johnstown	Johnstown	Pennsylvania	PSAC
Point Loma Nazarene	San Diego	California	PacWest
Point Park	Pittsburgh	Pennsylvania	MEC
Post	Waterbury	Connecticut	CACC
Purdue Northwest	Hammond	Indiana	GLIAC
Queens (NY)	New York City	New York	ECC
Quincy	Quincy	Illinois	GLVC
Regis	Denver	Colorado	RMAC
Roberts Wesleyan	Rochester	New York	ECC
Rockhurst	Kansas City	Missouri	GLVC
Rogers State	Claremore	Oklahoma	MIAA
Rollins	Winter Park	Florida	Sunshine State
Roosevelt	Chicago	Illinois	GLIAC
Saginaw Valley State	University Center	Michigan	GLIAC
Saint Anselm	Manchester	New Hampshire	NE-10
Saint Leo	St. Leo	Florida	Sunshine State
Saint Martin's	Lacey	Washington	GNAC
Saint Michael's	Colchester	Vermont	NE-10
Salem	Salem	West Virginia	Independent (Note: Salem is an associate member of the MEC in three sporting events.)
San Francisco State	San Francisco	California	CCAA
Savannah State	Savannah	Georgia	SIAC
Seattle Pacific	Seattle	Washington	GNAC
Seton Hill	Greensburg	Pennsylvania	PSAC
Shaw	Raleigh	North Carolina	CIAA
Shawnee State	Portsmouth	Ohio	MEC
Shepherd	Shepherdstown	West Virginia	PSAC
Shippensburg	Shippensburg	Pennsylvania	PSAC
Shorter	Rome	Georgia	Carolinas
Simon Fraser University	Burnaby	British Columbia	GNAC
Sioux Falls	Sioux Falls	South Dakota	NSIC
Slippery Rock	Slippery Rock	Pennsylvania	PSAC
South Dakota Mines	Rapid City	South Dakota	RMAC
Southeastern Oklahoma State	Durant	Oklahoma	GAC
Southern Arkansas	Magnolia	Arkansas	GAC
Southern Connecticut	New Haven	Connecticut	NE-10
Southern Nazarene	Bethany, Oklahoma	Oklahoma	GAC
Southern New Hampshire	Manchester	New Hampshire	NE-10
Southern Wesleyan	Central	South Carolina	Carolinas
Southwest Baptist	Bolivar	Missouri	GLVC
Southwest Minnesota State	Marshall	Minnesota	NSIC
Southwestern Oklahoma State	Weatherford	Oklahoma	GAC
Spring Hill	Mobile	Alabama	SIAC
St. Cloud State	St. Cloud	Minnesota	NSIC
St. Edward's	Austin	Texas	LSC
St. Mary's (TX)	San Antonio	Texas	LSC
St. Thomas Aquinas	Sparkill	New York	ECC
Staten Island	New York City	New York	ECC
Sul Ross State	Alpine	Texas	LSC
Tampa	Tampa	Florida	Sunshine State
Texas A&M International	Laredo	Texas	LSC
Texas A&M–Kingsville	Kingsville	Texas	LSC
Thomas More	Crestview Hills	Kentucky	G-MAC
Tiffin	Tiffin	Ohio	G-MAC
Trevecca Nazarene	Nashville	Tennessee	GSC
Truman State	Kirksville	Missouri	GLVC
Tusculum	Greeneville	Tennessee	SAC
Tuskegee	Tuskegee	Alabama	SIAC
UC Merced	Merced	California	CCAA
UCCS (UC Colorado Springs)	Colorado Springs	Colorado	RMAC
UDC	Washington, D.C.	N/A	ECC
UMSL (Missouri–St. Louis)	St. Louis	Missouri	GLVC
UNC Pembroke	Pembroke	North Carolina	Carolinas
Union	Jackson	Tennessee	GSC
Upper Iowa	Fayette	Iowa	GLVC
USC Aiken	Aiken	South Carolina	PBC
USC Beaufort	Bluffton	South Carolina	PBC
UT Permian Basin	Odessa	Texas	LSC
UVA Wise	Wise	Virginia	SAC
Valdosta State	Valdosta	Georgia	GSC
Vanguard	Costa Mesa	California	PacWest
Virginia State	Petersburg	Virginia	CIAA
Virginia Union	Richmond	Virginia	CIAA
Walsh	North Canton	Ohio	G-MAC
Washburn	Topeka	Kansas	MIAA
Wayne State (NE)	Wayne	Nebraska	NSIC
Wayne State (MI)	Detroit	Michigan	GLIAC
West Alabama	Livingston	Alabama	GSC
West Chester	West Chester	Pennsylvania	PSAC
West Florida	Pensacola	Florida	GSC
West Liberty	West Liberty	West Virginia	MEC
West Texas A&M	Canyon	Texas	LSC
West Virginia State	Institute	West Virginia	MEC
West Virginia Wesleyan	Buckhannon	West Virginia	MEC
Western Colorado	Gunnison	Colorado	RMAC
Western New Mexico	Silver City	New Mexico	LSC
Western Oregon	Monmouth	Oregon	GNAC
Western Washington	Bellingham	Washington	GNAC
Westminster	Salt Lake City	Utah	RMAC
Westmont	Santa Barbara	California	PacWest
Wheeling	Wheeling	West Virginia	MEC
William Jewell	Liberty	Missouri	GLVC
Wilmington	New Castle	Delaware	CACC
Wingate	Wingate	North Carolina	SAC
Winona State	Winona	Minnesota	NSIC
Winston-Salem State	Winston-Salem	North Carolina	CIAA
Young Harris	Young Harris	Georgia	Carolinas

== Future programs ==
Team	City	State	Conference	Starting
Lackawanna College	Scranton	Pennsylvania	PSAC	2027
Loyola University New Orleans	New Orleans	Louisiana	GSC	2027
Monroe University	New Rochelle	New York	CACC	2027
Texas A&M University–Texarkana	Texarkana	Texas	LSC	2027
Texas Wesleyan University	Fort Worth	Texas	LSC	2028

== See also ==
- List of NCAA Division II institutions
- List of NCAA Division II softball programs
- List of NCAA Division II football programs
- List of NCAA Division II men's soccer programs
- List of NCAA Division II lacrosse programs
- List of NCAA Division II men's wrestling programs
- List of NCAA Division II baseball programs
