= List of NCAA Division II men's wrestling programs =

This is a list of the schools in Division II of the National Collegiate Athletic Association (NCAA) in the United States and Canada that have men's wrestling as a varsity sport. In the current 2026–27 season, there are a total of 72 Division II men's wrestling programs.

Women's wrestling became an official NCAA championship sport in 2025–26, initially with a single championship meet open to members of all NCAA divisions. See List of NCAA women's wrestling programs.

== NCAA Division II men's wrestling programs ==
- Reclassifying institutions in yellow. Institution confirmed to be leaving Division II in pink.

School	Nickname	City	State/ Province	Conference	Primary Conference
Adams State University	Grizzlies	Alamosa	Colorado	Rocky Mountain Athletic Conference	
Allen University	Yellow Jackets	Columbia	South Carolina	Conference Carolinas	Southern Intercollegiate Athletic Conference
Ashland University	Eagles	Ashland	Ohio	Great Midwest Athletic Conference	
Augustana University	Vikings	Sioux Falls	South Dakota	Northern Sun Intercollegiate Conference	
Belmont Abbey College	Crusaders	Belmont	North Carolina	Conference Carolinas	
Bluefield State University	Big Blues	Bluefield	West Virginia	Conference Carolinas	Central Intercollegiate Athletic Association
University of Bridgeport	Purple Knights	Bridgeport	Connecticut	Independent	Central Atlantic Collegiate Conference
California State Polytechnic University, Humboldt	Lumberjacks	Arcata	California	Mountain Pacific Sports Federation	California Collegiate Athletic Association
University of Central Missouri	Mules	Warrensburg	Missouri	Mid-America Intercollegiate Athletics Association	
University of Central Oklahoma	Bronchos	Edmond	Oklahoma	Mid-America Intercollegiate Athletics Association	
Chadron State College	Eagles	Chadron	Nebraska	Rocky Mountain Athletic Conference	
Coker University	Cobras	Hartsville	South Carolina	Conference Carolinas	South Atlantic Conference
Colorado Mesa University	Mavericks	Grand Junction	Colorado	Rocky Mountain Athletic Conference	
Colorado School of Mines	Orediggers	Golden	Colorado	Rocky Mountain Athletic Conference	
Colorado State University–Pueblo	ThunderWolves	Pueblo	Colorado	Rocky Mountain Athletic Conference	
Davenport University	Panthers	Grand Rapids	Michigan	Great Midwest Athletic Conference	Great Lakes Intercollegiate Athletic Conference
Davis & Elkins College	Senators	Elkins	West Virginia	Mountain East Conference	
Drury University	Panthers	Springfield	Missouri	Great Lakes Valley Conference	
East Stroudsburg University of Pennsylvania	Warriors	East Stroudsburg	Pennsylvania	Pennsylvania State Athletic Conference	
Emmanuel University	Lions	Franklin Springs	Georgia	Conference Carolinas	
Emory and Henry University	Wasps	Emory	Virginia	Conference Carolinas	South Atlantic Conference
Fairmont State University	Falcons	Fairmont	West Virginia	Mountain East Conference	
Felician University	Golden Falcons	Rutherford	New Jersey	Independent	Central Atlantic Collegiate Conference
Ferrum College	Panthers	Ferrum	Virginia	Conference Carolinas	
University of Findlay	Oilers	Findlay	Ohio	Great Midwest Athletic Conference	
Fort Hays State University	Tigers	Hays	Kansas	Mid-America Intercollegiate Athletics Association	
Frostburg State University	Bobcats	Frostburg	Maryland	Mountain East Conference	
Gannon University	Golden Knights	Erie	Pennsylvania	Pennsylvania State Athletic Conference	
Glenville State University	Pioneers	Glenville	West Virginia	Mountain East Conference	
Grand Valley State University	Lakers	Allendale	Michigan	Great Lakes Valley Conference	Great Lakes Intercollegiate Athletic Conference
University of Indianapolis	Greyhounds	Indianapolis	Indiana	Great Lakes Valley Conference	
University of Jamestown	Jimmies	Jamestown	North Dakota	Northern Sun Intercollegiate Conference	
Kentucky Wesleyan College	Panthers	Owensboro	Kentucky	Great Midwest Athletic Conference	
King University	The Tornado	Bristol	Tennessee	Conference Carolinas	
Kutztown University of Pennsylvania	Golden Bears	Kutztown	Pennsylvania	Pennsylvania State Athletic Conference	
Lake Erie College	Storm	Painesville	Ohio	Great Midwest Athletic Conference	
Lander University	Bearcats	Greenwood	South Carolina	Conference Carolinas	Peach Belt Conference
Lincoln Memorial University	Railsplitters	Harrogate	Tennessee	Conference Carolinas	South Atlantic Conference
University of Mary	Marauders	Bismarck	North Dakota	Northern Sun Intercollegiate Conference	
Maryville University	Saints	St. Louis	Missouri	Great Lakes Valley Conference	
McKendree University	Bearcats	Lebanon	Illinois	Great Lakes Valley Conference	
Menlo College	Oaks	Atherton	California	Mountain Pacific Sports Federation	Pacific West Conference
Millersville University of Pennsylvania	Marauders	Millersville	Pennsylvania	Pennsylvania State Athletic Conference	
Minnesota State University, Mankato	Mavericks	Mankato	Minnesota	Northern Sun Intercollegiate Conference	
Minnesota State University Moorhead	Dragons	Moorhead	Minnesota	Northern Sun Intercollegiate Conference	
Minot State University	Beavers	Minot	North Dakota	Northern Sun Intercollegiate Conference	
University of Montevallo	Falcons	Montevallo	Alabama	Conference Carolinas	Gulf South Conference
University of Mount Olive	Trojans	Mount Olive	North Carolina	Conference Carolinas	
University of Nebraska at Kearney	Lopers	Kearney	Nebraska	Mid-America Intercollegiate Athletics Association	
New Mexico Highlands University	Cowboys	Las Vegas	New Mexico	Rocky Mountain Athletic Conference	
Newberry College	Wolves	Newberry	South Carolina	Conference Carolinas	South Atlantic Conference
Newman University (Kansas)	Jets	Wichita	Kansas	Mid-America Intercollegiate Athletics Association	
University of North Carolina at Pembroke	Braves	Pembroke	North Carolina	Conference Carolinas	
Northern State University	Wolves	Aberdeen	South Dakota	Northern Sun Intercollegiate Conference	
Northeastern State University	RiverHawks	Tahlequah	Oklahoma	Mid-America Intercollegiate Athletics Association	
Ouachita Baptist University	Tigers	Arkadelphia	Arkansas	Mid-America Intercollegiate Athletics Association	Great American Conference
University of Pittsburgh at Johnstown	Mountain Cats	Johnstown	Pennsylvania	Pennsylvania State Athletic Conference	
University of Puerto Rico at Mayagüez	Bulldogs	Mayagüez	Puerto Rico	Independent	
Quincy University	Hawks	Quincy	Illinois	Great Lakes Valley Conference	
St. Cloud State University	Huskies	St. Cloud	Minnesota	Northern Sun Intercollegiate Conference	
Salem University (Note: Salem will leave the NCAA and rejoin the NAIA in 2027.)	Tigers	Salem	West Virginia	Mountain East Conference	Independent
San Francisco State University	Gators	San Francisco	California	Mountain Pacific Sports Federation	California Collegiate Athletic Association
Seton Hill University	Griffins	Greensburg	Pennsylvania	Pennsylvania State Athletic Conference	
Shippensburg University of Pennsylvania	Red Raiders	Shippensburg	Pennsylvania	Pennsylvania State Athletic Conference	
Shorter University	Hawks	Rome	Georgia	Conference Carolinas	
Simon Fraser University (Note: Simon Fraser will leave the NCAA and rejoin Canada's corresponding governing body of U Sports in 2027.)	Red Leafs	Burnaby	British Columbia	Rocky Mountain Athletic Conference	Great Northwest Athletic Conference
University of Sioux Falls	Cougars	Sioux Falls	South Dakota	Northern Sun Intercollegiate Conference	
Southwest Minnesota State University	Mustangs	Marshall	Minnesota	Northern Sun Intercollegiate Conference	
Thomas More University	Saints	Crestview Hills	Kentucky	Great Midwest Athletic Conference	
Tiffin University	Dragons	Tiffin	Ohio	Great Midwest Athletic Conference	
Upper Iowa University	Peacocks	Fayette	Iowa	Great Lakes Valley Conference	
Vanguard University	Lions	Costa Mesa	California	Mountain Pacific Sports Federation	Pacific West Conference
West Liberty University	Hilltoppers	West Liberty	West Virginia	Mountain East Conference	
Western Colorado University	Mountaineers	Gunnison	Colorado	Rocky Mountain Athletic Conference	
Wheeling University	Cardinals	Wheeling	West Virginia	Mountain East Conference	
University of Wisconsin–Parkside	Rangers	Kenosha	Wisconsin	Northern Sun Intercollegiate Conference	Great Lakes Intercollegiate Athletic Conference

- All schools listed as competing in Conference Carolinas men's wrestling technically compete in South Atlantic Conference Carolinas, a formal alliance between CC and the South Atlantic Conference that operates in field hockey and men's wrestling. CC administers the SACC wrestling championship, while the SAC administers the field hockey championship.

== Future Division II wrestling programs ==
School	Nickname	City	State/ province	Conference	Primary conference	Note	Begins competition
Slippery Rock University	The Rock	Slippery Rock	Pennsylvania	Pennsylvania State Athletic Conference		Reinstating the sport	2027
Texas Wesleyan University	Rams	Fort Worth	Texas	Independent	Lone Star Conference	Joining from the NAIA	2028

== Map of Division II men's wrestling programs ==
All Division II men's wrestling programs during the 2026-27 season. Conferences (clockwise from northeast): cyan pog: PSAC, green pog: Mountain East, blue pog: Conference Carolinas, red pog: MIAA, orange pog: RMAC, pink pog: MPSF, yellow pog: NSIC, purple pog: GLVC, black pog: GMAC, white pog: Independent, red dot: Future.
Not shown: Puerto Rico-Mayagüez, an independent

== See also ==
- Collegiate wrestling
- NCAA Division II Wrestling Championships
- List of NCAA Division II institutions
- List of NCAA Division II football programs
- List of NCAA Division II baseball programs
- List of NCAA Division II lacrosse programs
- List of NCAA Division II men's soccer programs
- List of NCAA Division II men's basketball programs
- List of NCAA Divisions II and III schools competing in NCAA Division I sports
- List of NCAA Division I men's wrestling programs
- List of NCAA women's wrestling programs
