= List of NCAA Division II baseball programs =

The following is a list of schools that participate in NCAA Division II baseball.

Conference affiliations are current for the 2027 baseball season.

== Division II programs ==
Team	Nickname	City	State	Conference	Stadium	Capacity
Adams State	Grizzlies	Alamosa	Colorado	RMAC	ASU Baseball Field	500
Adelphi	Panthers	Garden City	New York	NE-10	William J. Bonomo Memorial Field	500
Alabama–Huntsville	Chargers	Huntsville	Alabama	Gulf South	Charger Park	500
Albany State	Golden Rams	Albany	Georgia	SIAC	West Campus Baseball Field	400
American International	Yellow Jackets	Springfield	Massachusetts	NE-10	Richard F. Bedard Field	500
Anderson	Trojans	Anderson	South Carolina	SAC	Anderson Memorial Stadium	2,500
Angelo State	Rams	San Angelo	Texas	Lone Star	Foster Field at 1st Community Credit Union Stadium	4,000
Arkansas Tech	Wonder Boys	Russellville	Arkansas	GAC	Baswell Field	500
Arkansas–Fort Smith	Lions	Fort Smith	Arkansas	MIAA	Crowder Field	1,000
Arkansas–Monticello	Boll Weevils	Monticello	Arkansas	GAC	Weevils Field	600
Ashland	Eagles	Ashland	Ohio	G-MAC	Donges Field	650
Assumption	Greyhounds	Worcester	Massachusetts	NE-10	H.L. Rocheleau '24 Field	500
Auburn Montgomery	Warhawks	Montgomery	Alabama	Gulf South	AUM Baseball Complex	600
Augusta	Jaguars	Augusta	Georgia	Peach Belt	Jaguar Field	100
Augustana	Vikings	Sioux Falls	South Dakota	NSIC	Ronken Field	400
Barry	Buccaneers	Miami Shores	Florida	SSC	Feinbloom Field	1,000
Barton	Bulldogs	Wilson	North Carolina	Carolinas	Fleming Stadium	3,000
Belmont Abbey	Crusaders	Belmont	North Carolina	Carolinas	Abbey Yard	1,000
Bemidji State	Beavers	Bemidji	Minnesota	NSIC	BSU Baseball Field	250
Benedict	Tigers	Columbia	South Carolina	SIAC	Tiger Field	250
Bentley	Falcons	Waltham	Massachusetts	NE-10	DeFelice Field	1,700
Biola	Eagles	La Mirada	California	PacWest	Eagles Diamond	500
Bloomsburg	Huskies	Bloomsburg	Pennsylvania	PSAC	Danny Litwhiler Field	100
Bluefield State	Big Blue	Bluefield	West Virginia	Independent (Note: Bluefield State and Virginia State primarily play in the non-baseball-sponsoring Central Intercollegiate Athletic Association.)	Bowen Field (Bluefield, VA)	3,000
Bridgeport	Purple Knights	Bridgeport	Connecticut	CACC	Seaside Park Baseball Complex	—N/a
Caldwell	Cougars	Caldwell	New Jersey	CACC	Kiwanis Oval	500
Cal Poly Pomona	Broncos	Pomona	California	CCAA	Scolinos Field	500
Cal State Dominguez Hills	Toros	Carson	California	CCAA	Toro Field	400
Cal State East Bay	Pioneers	Hayward	California	CCAA	Pioneer Field	200
Cal State Los Angeles	Golden Eagles	Los Angeles	California	CCAA	Reeder Field	500
Cal State Monterey Bay	Otters	Seaside	California	CCAA	Otter Sports Complex	600
Cal State San Bernardino	Coyotes	San Bernardino	California	CCAA	Fiscalini Field	5,000
Cal State San Marcos	Cougars	San Marcos	California	CCAA	CSUSM Baseball Field	350
Cal State Stanislaus	Warriors	Turlock	California	CCAA	Warrior Baseball Field	1,000
California (PA)	Vulcans	California	Pennsylvania	PSAC	Wild Things Park	3,200
Cameron	Aggies	Lawton	Oklahoma	Lone Star	McCord Field	1,200
Carson–Newman	Eagles	Jefferson City	Tennessee	SAC	Silver Diamond Baseball Complex	750
Catawba	Indians	Salisbury	North Carolina	SAC	Newman Park	1,500
Cedarville	Yellow Jackets	Cedarville	Ohio	G-MAC	Yellow Jacket Field	500
Central Missouri	Mules	Warrensburg	Missouri	MIAA	Crane Stadium at Tompkins Field	1,500
Central Oklahoma	Bronchos	Edmond	Oklahoma	MIAA	Wendell Simmons Field	—N/a
Central Washington	Wildcats	Ellensburg	Washington	GNAC	CWU Baseball Field	500
Chaminade	Silverswords	Honolulu	Hawaii	PacWest	Various	—N/a
Charleston (WV)	Golden Eagles	Charleston	West Virginia	MEC	GoMart Ballpark	4,500
Chestnut Hill	Griffins	Philadelphia	Pennsylvania	CACC	Latshaw–McCathy Field (Norristown)	1,000
Chico State	Wildcats	Chico	California	CCAA	Nettleton Stadium	4,100
Chowan	Hawks	Murfreesboro	North Carolina	Carolinas	Hawkins Field	500
Christian Brothers	Buccaneers	Memphis	Tennessee	Gulf South	Nadicksbernd Field	—N/a
Claflin	Panthers	Orangeburg	South Carolina	Peach Belt (Note: Claflin is an affiliate of the Peach Belt for baseball, and primarily plays in the non-baseball-sponsoring Central Intercollegiate Athletic Association.)	Mirmow Field	3,000
Clark Atlanta	Panthers	Atlanta	Georgia	SIAC	Bill Evans Field	—N/a
Clarion	Golden Eagles	Clarion	Pennsylvania	PSAC	Memorial Stadium Complex	—N/a
Colorado Christian	Cougars	Lakewood	Colorado	RMAC	All Star Park	442
Colorado Mesa	Mavericks	Grand Junction	Colorado	RMAC	Suplizio Field	10,000
Colorado Mines	Orediggers	Golden	Colorado	RMAC	Darden Field	500
Columbus State	Cougars	Columbus	Georgia	Peach Belt	Burger King Stadium at Ragsdale Field	—N/a
Concord	Mountain Lions	Athens	West Virginia	MEC	Anderson Field	—N/a
Concordia–Irvine	Golden Eagles	Irvine	California	PacWest	Golden Eagles Field	400
Concordia–St. Paul	Golden Bears	Saint Paul	Minnesota	NSIC	Barnes Field	2,500
Coker	Cobras	Hartsville	South Carolina	SAC	Dave Schmotzer Stadium	—N/a
CSU Pueblo	ThunderWolves	Pueblo	Colorado	RMAC	Rawlings Field	2,500
Davenport	Panthers	Grand Rapids	Michigan	GLIAC	Farmers Insurance Athletic Complex	300
Davis & Elkins	Senators	Elkins	West Virginia	MEC	Harpertown Field	—N/a
Delta State	Statesmen	Cleveland	Mississippi	Gulf South	Harvey Stadium at Ferriss Field	1,500
Dominican (NY)	Chargers	Orangeburg	New York	CACC	Veterans Memorial Park; Clover Stadium (Pomona)	— 6,362
Drury	Panthers	Springfield	Missouri	GLVC	U.S. Baseball Park (Ozark)	4,000
D'Youville	Saints	Buffalo	New York	ECC	Sal Maglie Stadium	4,000
East Central	Tigers	Ada	Oklahoma	GAC	ECU Baseball Field	—N/a
East Stroudsburg	Warriors	East Stroudsburg	Pennsylvania	PSAC	Creekview Park	—N/a
Eastern New Mexico	Greyhounds	Portales	New Mexico	Lone Star	Greyhound Baseball Field	—N/a
Eckerd	Tritons	St. Petersburg	Florida	SSC	Turley Athletic Complex	—N/a
Edward Waters	Tigers	Jacksonville	Florida	SIAC	J. P. Small Memorial Stadium	—N/a
Embry–Riddle	Eagles	Daytona Beach	Florida	SSC	Sliwa Stadium	615
Emmanuel	Lions	Franklin Springs	Georgia	Carolinas	Tommy Carey Baseball Field	—N/a
Emory & Henry	Wasps	Emory	Virginia	SAC	Porterfield–DeVault Field	—N/a
Emporia State	Hornets	Emporia	Kansas	MIAA	Glennen Field at Trusler Sports Complex	500
Erskine	Flying Fleet	Due West	South Carolina	Carolinas	Grier Field	—N/a
Fairmont State	Fighting Falcons	Fairmont	West Virginia	MEC	Bridgeport Recreation Complex (Bridgeport)	—N/a
Felician	Golden Falcons	Lodi	New Jersey	CACC	Palisades Park Sportsplex (Palisades Park)	—N/a
Ferrum	Panthers	Ferrum	Virginia	Carolinas	Panther Field	—N/a
Findlay	Oilers	Findlay	Ohio	G-MAC	Fifth Third Field	—N/a
Flagler	Saints	St. Augustine	Florida	Peach Belt	Drysdale Field	700
Florida Southern	Moccasins	Lakeland	Florida	SSC	Henley Field	1,000
Florida Tech	Panthers	Melbourne	Florida	SSC	Andy Seminick-Les Hall Field	500
Fort Hays State	Tigers	Hays	Kansas	MIAA	Larks Park	1,200
Francis Marion	Patriots	Florence	South Carolina	Carolinas	Sparrow Stadium	1,755
Franklin Pierce	Ravens	Rindge	New Hampshire	NE-10	Dr. Arthur and Martha Pappas Field	—N/a
Fresno Pacific	Sunbirds	Fresno	California	CCAA	FPU Diamond	600
Frostburg State	Bobcats	Frostburg	Maryland	MEC	Bob Wells Field	250
Gannon	Golden Knights	Erie	Pennsylvania	PSAC	McConnell Family Stadium	2,500
Georgia College	Bobcats	Milledgeville	Georgia	Peach Belt	John Kurtz Field	—N/a
Georgia Southwestern State	Hurricanes	Americus	Georgia	Peach Belt	Hurricane Stadium	—N/a
Georgian Court	Lions	Lakewood	New Jersey	CACC	Jackson Justice Complex	—N/a
Glenville State	Pioneers	Glenville	West Virginia	MEC	Sue Morris Sports Complex	—N/a
Goldey–Beacom	Lightning	Pike Creek Valley	Delaware	CACC	Doyle Field (Hockessin)	—N/a
Grand Valley State	Lakers	Allendale	Michigan	GLIAC	GVSU Baseball Field	—N/a
Harding	Bisons	Searcy	Arkansas	GAC	Jerry Moore Field	300
Hawaiʻi–Hilo	Vulcans	Hilo	Hawaii	PacWest	Francis Wong Stadium	2,400
Hawaiʻi Pacific	Sharks	Honolulu	Hawaii	PacWest	Hans L'Orange Field	2,200
Henderson State	Reddies	Arkadelphia	Arkansas	GAC	Clyde Berry Field	150
Hillsdale	Chargers	Hillsdale	Michigan	G-MAC	Simpson Field	200
Holy Family	Tigers	Philadelphia	Pennsylvania	CACC	FDR Park	—N/a
Indianapolis	Greyhounds	Indianapolis	Indiana	GLVC	Greyhound Park	750
IUP	Crimson Hawks	Indiana	Pennsylvania	PSAC	Owen J. Dougherty Field	—N/a
Jamestown	Jimmies	Jamestown	North Dakota	NSIC	Jack Brown Stadium	—N/a
Jefferson	Rams	Philadelphia	Pennsylvania	CACC	Alumni Field	—N/a
Jessup	Warriors	Rocklin	California	PacWest	Various	—N/a
Kentucky State	Thorobreds	Frankfort	Kentucky	SIAC	Alumni Field	—N/a
Kentucky Wesleyan	Panthers	Owensboro	Kentucky	G-MAC	Panther Park	—N/a
King	Tornado	Bristol	Tennessee	Carolinas	King Baseball Field	140
Kutztown	Golden Bears	Kutztown	Pennsylvania	PSAC	North Campus Baseball Field	—N/a
Lander	Bearcats	Greenwood	South Carolina	Peach Belt	Stephen B. Dolny Stadium	750
Lane	Dragons	Jackson	Tennessee	SIAC	Liberty Technology Magnet High School; The Ballpark at Jackson	— 6,000
Lake Erie	Storm	Painesville	Ohio	G-MAC	Classic Park	7,273
Lee	Flames	Cleveland	Tennessee	Gulf South	Larry Carpenter Stadium at Olympic Field	356
LeMoyne–Owen	Magicians	Memphis	Tennessee	SIAC	Gameday Field	—N/a
Lenoir–Rhyne	Bears	Hickory	North Carolina	SAC	Durham Field	500
Lewis	Flyers	Romeoville	Illinois	GLVC	Brennan Field	—N/a
Lincoln (MO)	Blue Tigers	Jefferson City	Missouri	GLVC	Vivion Field	—N/a
Lincoln (PA)	Lions	Oxford	Pennsylvania	CACC (Note: Lincoln (PA) is an affiliate of the CACC for baseball, and primarily plays in the non-baseball-sponsoring Central Intercollegiate Athletic Association.)	LU Baseball Complex	—N/a
Lincoln Memorial	Railsplitters	Harrogate	Tennessee	SAC	Lamar Hennon Field	750
Lock Haven	Bald Eagles	Lock Haven	Pennsylvania	PSAC	Watkins Field	—N/a
Lubbock Christian	Chaparrals	Lubbock	Texas	Lone Star	Hays Field	4,500
Lynn	Fighting Knights	Boca Raton	Florida	SSC	Lynn Baseball Field	—N/a
Malone	Pioneers	Canton	Ohio	G-MAC	Thurman Munson Stadium	5,700
Mansfield	Mountaineers	Mansfield	Pennsylvania	PSAC	Joseph Shaute Field	—N/a
Mars Hill	Lions	Mars Hill	North Carolina	SAC	Henderson Field	500
Mary	Marauders	Bismarck	North Dakota	NSIC	Bismarck Municipal Ballpark	2,500
Maryville (MO)	Saints	Town and Country	Missouri	GLVC	Weber Baseball Field	—N/a
McKendree	Bearcats	Lebanon	Illinois	GLVC	Hypes Field	500
Menlo	Oaks	Atherton	California	CCAA	Cartan Baseball Field	—N/a
Mercy	Mavericks	Dobbs Ferry	New York	ECC	Mercy Field	—N/a
Metropolitan State	Roadrunners	Denver	Colorado	RMAC	Assembly Athletic Complex	400
Middle Georgia	Knights	Cochran	Georgia	Peach Belt	Stuckey Field	—N/a
Miles	Golden Bears	Fairfield	Alabama	SIAC	Rickwood Field	10,800
Millersville	Marauders	Millersville	Pennsylvania	PSAC	Cooper Park	250
Minnesota State	Mavericks	Mankato	Minnesota	NSIC	Bowyer Field	450
Minnesota–Crookston	Golden Eagles	Crookston	Minnesota	NSIC	UMC Baseball Field	300
Minnesota–Duluth	Bulldogs	Duluth	Minnesota	NSIC	Wade Stadium	4,200
Minot State	Beavers	Minot	North Dakota	NSIC	Corbett Field	2,000
Mississippi Christian	Choctaws	Clinton	Mississippi	Gulf South	Frierson Field	1,200
Missouri Southern	Lions	Joplin	Missouri	MIAA	Warren Turner Field	600
Missouri S&T	Miners	Rolla	Missouri	GLVC	Ballpark at S&T	—N/a
Missouri Western	Griffons	St. Joseph	Missouri	MIAA	Griffon Baseball Field	500
Molloy	Lions	Rockville Centre	New York	ECC	Mitchel Athletic Complex	10,102
Montana State–Billings	Yellowjackets	Billings	Montana	GNAC	Dehler Park	3,071
Montevallo	Falcons	Montevallo	Alabama	Gulf South	Kermit A. Johnson Field at Bob Riesener Stadium	450
Morehouse	Maroon Tigers	Atlanta	Georgia	SIAC	Gresham Park	—N/a
Mount Olive	Trojans	Mount Olive	North Carolina	Carolinas	Scarborough Field	600
New Mexico Highlands	Cowboys	Las Vegas	New Mexico	RMAC	Brandt Baseball Field	1,500
Newberry	Wolves	Newberry	South Carolina	SAC	Smith Road Complex	—N/a
Newman	Jets	Wichita	Kansas	MIAA	McCarthy Field	—N/a
North Georgia	Nighthawks	Dahlonega	Georgia	Peach Belt	Bob Stein Stadium	500
North Greenville	Crusaders	Tigerville	South Carolina	Carolinas	Ashmore Field	700
Northeastern State	RiverHawks	Tahlequah	Oklahoma	MIAA	Rousey Field	1,000
Northern State	Wolves	Aberdeen	South Dakota	NSIC	Fossum Field	2,500
Northwest Missouri State	Bearcats	Maryville	Missouri	MIAA	Bearcat Field	500
Northwest Nazarene	Nighthawks	Nampa	Idaho	GNAC	Elmore W. Vail Field	—N/a
Northwestern Oklahoma State	Rangers	Alva	Oklahoma	GAC	Glass Family Field at Myers Stadium	—N/a
Northwood	Timberwolves	Midland	Michigan	G-MAC	Gerace Stadium	—N/a
Nova Southeastern	Sharks	Davie	Florida	SSC	NSU Baseball Complex	500
Ohio Dominican	Panthers	Columbus	Ohio	G-MAC	Frank Damian Field at Panther Valley	—N/a
Oklahoma Baptist	Bison	Shawnee	Oklahoma	GAC	Bobby Cox Field at Ford Park	300
Oklahoma Christian	Eagles	Oklahoma City	Oklahoma	Lone Star	Dobson Field	—N/a
Ouachita Baptist	Tigers	Arkadelphia	Arkansas	GAC	Rab Rodgers Field	500
Pace	Setters	Pleasantville	New York	NE-10	Peter X. Finnerty Field	—N/a
Palm Beach Atlantic	Sailfish	West Palm Beach	Florida	SSC	J.M. "Jake" Rubin Park	500
Parkside	Rangers	Somers	Wisconsin	GLIAC	Simmons Field	3,218
Pittsburg State	Gorillas	Pittsburg	Kansas	MIAA	Al Ortolani Field	—N/a
Pitt–Johnstown	Mountain Cats	Johnstown	Pennsylvania	PSAC	Point Stadium	7,500
Point Loma Nazarene	Sea Lions	San Diego	California	PacWest	Carroll B. Land Stadium	300
Point Park	Pioneers	Pittsburgh	Pennsylvania	MEC	Green Tree Park	—N/a
Post	Eagles	Waterbury	Connecticut	CACC	Municipal Stadium	6,000
Purdue Northwest	Pride	Hammond	Indiana	GLIAC	Laborers' Local 41 Field	—N/a
Queens (NY)	Knights	Queens	New York	ECC	Hennekens Stadium	150
Quincy	Hawks	Quincy	Illinois	GLVC	QU Stadium	2,500
Regis	Rangers	Denver	Colorado	RMAC	Regis Baseball Field	750
Rockhurst	Hawks	Kansas City	Missouri	GLVC	Loyola Park Baseball Field	—N/a
Rogers State	Hillcats	Claremore	Oklahoma	MIAA	Diamond Sports Complex	1,200
Rollins	Tars	Winter Park	Florida	SSC	Alfond Stadium	1,000
Roosevelt	Lakers	Chicago	Illinois	GLIAC	Ozinga Field	3,200
Saginaw Valley State	Cardinals	University Center	Michigan	GLIAC	SVSU Baseball Complex	346
Saint Anselm	Hawks	Goffstown	New Hampshire	NE-10	Sullivan Park	—N/a
St. Cloud State	Huskies	St. Cloud	Minnesota	NSIC	Joe Faber Field	2,000
St. Edward's	Hilltoppers	Austin	Texas	Lone Star	Lucian–Hamilton Field	500
Saint Leo	Lions	St. Leo	Florida	SSC	Thomas B. Southard Stadium	500
Saint Martin's	Saints	Lacey	Washington	GNAC	SMU Baseball Field	—N/a
St. Mary's	Rattlers	San Antonio	Texas	Lone Star	Dickson Stadium	2,260
Saint Michael's	Purple Knights	Colchester	Vermont	NE-10	George "Doc" Jacobs Field	—N/a
St. Thomas Aquinas	Spartans	Sparkill	New York	ECC	Clover Stadium	6,362
Salem	Tigers	Salem	West Virginia	Independent	Frank Loria Memorial Field	—N/a
San Francisco State	Gators	San Francisco	California	CCAA	Maloney Field	1,000
Savannah State	Tigers	Savannah	Georgia	SIAC	Tiger Baseball Field	800
Seton Hill	Griffins	Greensburg	Pennsylvania	PSAC	SHU Baseball Complex	150
Shawnee State	Bears	Portsmouth	Ohio	MEC	Branch Rickey Park	—N/a
Shepherd	Rams	Shepherdstown	West Virginia	PSAC	Fairfax Field	500
Shippensburg	Raiders	Shippensburg	Pennsylvania	PSAC	Fairchild Field	—N/a
Shorter	Hawks	Rome	Georgia	Carolinas	Robert H. Ledbetter Baseball Complex	—N/a
Sioux Falls	Cougars	Sioux Falls	South Dakota	NSIC	Sioux Falls Stadium	4,500
Slippery Rock	The Rock	Slippery Rock	Pennsylvania	PSAC	Jack Critchfield Park	1,500
Southeastern Oklahoma State	Savage Storm	Durant	Oklahoma	GAC	The Ballpark in Durant	—N/a
Southern Arkansas	Muleriders	Magnolia	Arkansas	GAC	Walker Stadium at Goodheart Field	1,000
Southern Connecticut	Owls	New Haven	Connecticut	NE-10	Ballpark at SCSU	500
Southern Nazarene	Crimson Storm	Bethany	Oklahoma	GAC	Feland Field	400
Southern New Hampshire	Penmen	Manchester	New Hampshire	NE-10	Penmen Field	200
Southern Wesleyan	Warriors	Central	South Carolina	Carolinas	Dr. C. Keith Connor Field	500
Southwest Baptist	Bearcats	Bolivar	Missouri	GLVC	Dodson Field	200
Southwest Minnesota State	Mustangs	Marshall	Minnesota	NSIC	Alumni Field	500
Southwestern Oklahoma State	Bulldogs	Weatherford	Oklahoma	GAC	SWOSU Athletic Complex	—N/a
Spring Hill	Badgers	Mobile	Alabama	SIAC	Sims-Galle Field	—N/a
Staten Island	Dolphins	Staten Island	New York	ECC	College of Staten Island Baseball Complex	2,500
Sul Ross State	Lobos	Alpine	Texas	Lone Star	Kokernot Field	1,400
Tampa	Spartans	Tampa	Florida	SSC	UT Baseball Field	750
Texas A&M International	Dustdevils	Laredo	Texas	Lone Star	Jorge Haynes Field	500
Texas A&M–Kingsville	Javelinas	Kingsville	Texas	Lone Star	Nolan Ryan Field	4,000
Thomas More	Saints	Crestview Hills	Kentucky	G-MAC	Thomas More Stadium (Florence)	4,500
Tiffin	Dragons	Tiffin	Ohio	G-MAC	Paradiso Athletic Fields	—N/a
Trevecca Nazarene	Trojans	Nashville	Tennessee	Gulf South	Jackson Field	—N/a
Truman	Bulldogs	Kirksville	Missouri	GLVC	Truman Baseball Field	—N/a
Tusculum	Pioneers	Tusculum	Tennessee	SAC	Pioneer Park	2,500
Tuskegee	Golden Tigers	Tuskegee	Alabama	SIAC	Washington Field	—N/a
UCCS	Mountain Lions	Colorado Springs	Colorado	RMAC	Mountain Lion Park	1,500
UIS	Prairie Stars	Springfield	Illinois	GLVC	UIS Baseball Field	500
UMSL	Tritons	St. Louis	Missouri	GLVC	UMSL Baseball Field	200
UNC Pembroke	Braves	Pembroke	North Carolina	Carolinas	Grace P. Johnson Stadium	4,000
Union	Bulldogs	Jackson	Tennessee	Gulf South	Fesmire Field	—N/a
Upper Iowa	Peacocks	Fayette	Iowa	GLVC	Robertson Woods Field	—N/a
USC Aiken	Pacers	Aiken	South Carolina	Peach Belt	Roberto Hernandez Stadium	1,000
USC Beaufort	Sand Sharks	Bluffton	South Carolina	Peach Belt	Richard Gray Sports Complex	—N/a
UT Dallas	Comets	Richardson	Texas	Lone Star	UT Dallas Baseball Field	250
UT Permian Basin	Falcons	Odessa	Texas	Lone Star	Roden Field	—N/a
UT Tyler	Patriots	Tyler	Texas	Lone Star	Irwin Field	1,000
UVA Wise	Cavaliers	Wise	Virginia	SAC	Burchell Stallard Field	—N/a
Valdosta State	Blazers	Valdosta	Georgia	Gulf South	Billy Grant Field	800
Vanguard	Lions	Costa Mesa	California	PacWest	Dean Harvey Field	—N/a
Virginia State	Trojans	Ettrick	Virginia	Independent (Note: Virginia State competes in the New South Athletic Conference for baseball, an independent conference not affiliated with the NCAA.)	Whaley Colbert Field	—N/a
Walsh	Cavaliers	North Canton	Ohio	G-MAC	Biery Stadium at Tim Mead Field	—N/a
Washburn	Ichabods	Topeka	Kansas	MIAA	Falley Field	800
Wayne State (MI)	Warriors	Detroit	Michigan	GLIAC	Harwell Baseball Field	500
Wayne State (NE)	Wildcats	Wayne	Nebraska	NSIC	Pete Chapman Baseball Complex	—N/a
West Alabama	Tigers	Livingston	Alabama	Gulf South	Tartt Field	—N/a
West Chester	Golden Rams	West Chester	Pennsylvania	PSAC	Serpico Stadium	1,000
West Liberty	Hilltoppers	West Liberty	West Virginia	MEC	Kovalic Field	—N/a
West Texas A&M	Buffaloes	Canyon	Texas	Lone Star	Wilder Park	490
West Virginia State	Yellow Jackets	Institute	West Virginia	MEC	Calvin L. Bailey Field	500
West Virginia Wesleyan	Bobcats	Buckhannon	West Virginia	MEC	Hank Ellis Field	—N/a
Western Oregon	Wolves	Monmouth	Oregon	GNAC	WOU Baseball Field	420
Westmont	Warriors	Santa Barbara	California	PacWest	Russell Carr Field	—N/a
Wheeling	Cardinals	Wheeling	West Virginia	MEC	JB Chambers I-470 Complex	—N/a
William Jewell	Cardinals	Liberty	Missouri	GLVC	Talley Stadium	250
Wilmington	Wildcats	New Castle	Delaware	CACC	Wilson Field at Jim Sherman Sr. Stadium	400
Wingate	Bulldogs	Wingate	North Carolina	SAC	Ron Christopher Stadium	—N/a
Winona State	Warriors	Winona	Minnesota	NSIC	Loughrey Field	500
Young Harris	Mountain Lions	Young Harris	Georgia	Carolinas	Zell B. Miller Field	—N/a

== Future D-II programs ==
Team	Nickname	City	State	Conference	Joining D-II (Note: Listed years reflect baseball seasons, which take place in the calendar year after a school joins a new conference.)	Stadium	Capacity
Lackawanna	Falcons	Scranton	Pennsylvania	PSAC	2028 (Note: Start of D-II competition.)	Scranton High School	—N/a
Lees–McRae	Bobcats	Banner Elk	North Carolina	Carolinas	2028	TBA	—N/a
Loyola (LA)	Wolf Pack	New Orleans	Louisiana	Gulf South	2028 (Note: Start of D-II competition. Although Loyola formally proposes to join the Gulf South in July 2027, it will continue to compete in the NAIA for the 2027 season.)	Segnette Field	750
Monroe	Mustangs	New Rochelle	New York	CACC	2028 (Note: Start of D-II competition. Although Monroe formally proposes to join the CACC in July 2027, it will continue to compete in the NJCAA for the 2027 season.)	Dick Caswell Field	—N/a
Texas A&M–Texarkana	Eagles	Texarkana	Texas	Lone Star	2028 (Note: Start of D-II competition. Although Texas A&M–Texarkana joins the LSC in July 2027, it will continue to compete in the NAIA for the 2027 season.)	George Dobson Field	—N/a
Texas Wesleyan (Note: Texas Wesleyan previously competed in D-II baseball during the 2000 and 2001 seasons in the Heartland Conference.)	Rams	Fort Worth	Texas	Lone Star	2029 (Note: Start of D-II competition. Although Texas Wesleyan formally proposes to join D-II in July 2028, it will continue to compete in the NAIA for the 2028 season.)	Sycamore Park	—N/a

== See also ==
- NCAA Division II baseball tournament
- List of NCAA Division II institutions
- List of NCAA Division II softball programs
- List of NCAA Division II football programs
- List of NCAA Division II men's soccer programs
- List of NCAA Division II lacrosse programs
- List of NCAA Division II men's wrestling programs
- List of NCAA Division II men's basketball programs
- List of NCAA Division I baseball programs
