= Southern Arkansas Muleriders softball =

Southern Arkansas Muleriders
- University: Southern Arkansas University
- Head coach: Jason Anderson (5th season)
- Conference: GAC
- Location: Magnolia, Arkansas, US
- Home stadium: Dawson Field (capacity: 500)
- Nickname: Muleriders
- Colors: Royal blue and gold

NCAA WCWS appearances
- 2016, 2018

NCAA Tournament appearances
- 2014, 2016, 2017, 2018, 2019

Conference tournament championships
- 2014, 2016

Regular-season conference championships
- 2003 (GSC Western Division), 2018, 2019

The Southern Arkansas Muleriders softball team represents Southern Arkansas University in NCAA Division II college softball. SAU has competed in the Great American Conference (GAC) since 2011. Upon reorganizing the team in 1999, SAU was a member of the Western Division of the Gulf South Conference until joining the GAC in 2011. The Muleriders play their home games on campus at Lady Mulerider Field. Jason Anderson is the current head coach.

== History ==
Southern Arkansas fielded a softball team as far back as 1930; however, college opponents were difficult to find. Softball has seen some success over the years. Kathryn Smith Brown coached a team to the finals of the AAU Southwest Regional Tournament in 1949. In 1980, Margaret Browning lead the Lady Muleriders to their first full conference championship in school history.

In 1999, SAU hired Kevin Blaskowski to restart the SAU softball program after several years of not sponsoring the sport. The program has seen off and on periods of success since reorganizing. Blaskowski's 2003 Lady Muleriders shared the Gulf South Conference Western Division crown. Since reorganizing the team in 1999, the Lady Muleriders have compiled a 378–455 (.454) record.

On May 3, 2014, the Lady Muleriders won the GAC softball tournament championship with 4–0 and 8–0 wins over Southeastern Oklahoma State University. In his three seasons at SAU, Coach Lyon finished with a 90–89 record. On June 27, 2014, Coach Lyon was named the head coach of the Louisiana–Monroe Warhawks softball team. On July 2, 2014 Jason Anderson was named the head coach of the Lady Muleriders.

== Dawson Field ==
After several years of playing their home games at a city owned park, the Lady Muleriders opened Dawson Field at the Mulerider Softball Complex during the 2014 season. The 2014 season was a special season for the Lady Muleriders. In their first season in the new park, the Lady Muleriders won their first Great American Conference championship. Lady Mulerider Field is a state of the art facility featuring seating for approximately 400 fans and includes covered batting cages for the Lady Muleriders.

== Head coaches ==
- Records are for coaches from 1999 through present

Tenure	Coach	Years	Record	Pct.	Championships
1999–2003	Kevin Blaskowski	5	136–126	.519	1
2004–2005	Jenifer Pagani	2	56–45	.554	0
2006–2007	Jamie Madewell	3	53–58	.477	0
2008–2011	Kevin Allison	4	43–139	.236	0
2012–2014	Corey Lyon	3	90–89	.503	1
2015–present	Jason Anderson	5	230-75	.754	3
Totals	6 coaches	22	608-532	.533	5
