= List of NCAA Division II men's soccer programs =

This is a list of the schools in Division II of the National Collegiate Athletic Association (NCAA) in the United States and Canada that have men's soccer as a varsity sport. In the 2025 season, there are a total of 203 men's Division II soccer programs. Conference affiliations are current for the 2026 season.

== NCAA Division II men's soccer programs ==
- Reclassifying institutions in yellow. Institution that has announced a future departure from Division II in pink.

School	Nickname	City	State/ Province	Conference	Note
Adams State University	Grizzlies	Alamosa	Colorado	Rocky Mountain Athletic Conference	
Adelphi University	Panthers	Garden City	New York	Northeast-10 Conference	
University of Alabama in Huntsville	Chargers	Huntsville	Alabama	Gulf South Conference	
American International College	Yellow Jackets	Springfield	Massachusetts	Northeast-10 Conference	
Anderson University	Trojans	Anderson	South Carolina	South Atlantic Conference	
Ashland University	Eagles	Ashland	Ohio	Great Midwest Athletic Conference	
Assumption University	Greyhounds	Worcester	Massachusetts	Northeast-10 Conference	
Auburn University at Montgomery	Warhawks	Montgomery	Alabama	Gulf South Conference	
Barry University	Buccaneers	Miami Shores	Florida	Sunshine State Conference	
Barton College	Bulldogs	Wilson	North Carolina	Conference Carolinas	
Belmont Abbey College	Crusaders	Belmont	North Carolina	Conference Carolinas	
Bentley University	Falcons	Waltham	Massachusetts	Northeast-10 Conference	
Biola University	Eagles	La Mirada	California	Pacific West Conference	
University of Bridgeport	Purple Knights	Bridgeport	Connecticut	Central Atlantic Collegiate Conference	
Caldwell University	Cougars	Caldwell	New Jersey	Central Atlantic Collegiate Conference	
California State Polytechnic University, Humboldt (Cal Poly Humboldt)	Lumberjacks	Arcata	California	California Collegiate Athletic Association	
California State Polytechnic University, Pomona (Cal Poly Pomona)	Broncos	Pomona	California	California Collegiate Athletic Association	
California State University, Chico (Chico State)	Wildcats	Chico	California	California Collegiate Athletic Association	
California State University, Dominguez Hills	Toros	Carson	California	California Collegiate Athletic Association	
California State University, East Bay	Pioneers	Hayward	California	California Collegiate Athletic Association	
California State University, Los Angeles	Golden Eagles	Los Angeles	California	California Collegiate Athletic Association	
California State University, Monterey Bay	Otters	Seaside	California	California Collegiate Athletic Association	
California State University, San Bernardino	Coyotes	San Bernardino	California	California Collegiate Athletic Association	
California State University, San Marcos	Cougars	San Marcos	California	California Collegiate Athletic Association	
California State University, Stanislaus	Warriors	Turlock	California	California Collegiate Athletic Association	
University of California, Merced (UC Merced)	Golden Bobcats	Merced	California	California Collegiate Athletic Association	
Carson–Newman University	Eagles	Jefferson City	Tennessee	South Atlantic Conference	
Catawba College	Indians	Salisbury	North Carolina	South Atlantic Conference	
Cedarville University	Yellow Jackets	Cedarville	Ohio	Great Midwest Athletic Conference	
Chaminade University of Honolulu	Silverswords	Honolulu	Hawai'i	Pacific West Conference	
University of Charleston	Golden Eagles	Charleston	West Virginia	Mountain East Conference	
Chestnut Hill College	Griffins	Philadelphia	Pennsylvania	Central Atlantic Collegiate Conference	
Chowan University	Hawks	Murfreesboro	North Carolina	Conference Carolinas	
Christian Brothers University	Buccaneers	Memphis	Tennessee	Gulf South Conference	(Note: Returning to the NAIA in 2027, joining the Mid-South Conference.)
Clayton State University	Lakers	Morrow	Georgia	Peach Belt Conference	
Coker University	Cobras	Hartsville	South Carolina	South Atlantic Conference	
Colorado Christian University	Cougars	Lakewood	Colorado	Rocky Mountain Athletic Conference	
Colorado Mesa University	Mavericks	Grand Junction	Colorado	Rocky Mountain Athletic Conference	
Colorado School of Mines	Orediggers	Golden	Colorado	Rocky Mountain Athletic Conference	
Colorado State University–Pueblo	ThunderWolves	Pueblo	Colorado	Rocky Mountain Athletic Conference	
University of Colorado Colorado Springs (UCCS)	Mountain Lions	Colorado Springs	Colorado	Rocky Mountain Athletic Conference	
Commonwealth University-Bloomsburg	Huskies	Bloomsburg	Pennsylvania	Pennsylvania State Athletic Conference	
Commonwealth University-Lock Haven	Bald Eagles	Lock Haven	Pennsylvania	Pennsylvania State Athletic Conference	
Concord University	Mountain Lions	Athens	West Virginia	Mountain East Conference	
Concordia University–Irvine	Eagles	Irvine	California	Pacific West Conference	
Converse University	Valkyries	Spartanburg	South Carolina	Conference Carolinas	
Daemen University	Wildcats	Amherst	New York	East Coast Conference	
Dallas Baptist University	Patriots	Dallas	Texas	Lone Star Conference	
Davenport University	Panthers	Grand Rapids	Michigan	Great Lakes Intercollegiate Athletic Conference	
Davis & Elkins College	Senators	Elkins	West Virginia	Mountain East Conference	
Delta State University	Statesmen	Cleveland	Mississippi	Gulf South Conference	
University of the District of Columbia	Firebirds	Washington	District of Columbia	East Coast Conference	
Dominican University of California	Penguins	San Rafael	California	Pacific West Conference	
Dominican University New York	Chargers	Orangeburg	New York	Central Atlantic Collegiate Conference	
Drury University	Panthers	Springfield	Missouri	Great Lakes Valley Conference	
D'Youville University	Saints	Buffalo	New York	East Coast Conference	
East Stroudsburg University of Pennsylvania	Warriors	East Stroudsburg	Pennsylvania	Pennsylvania State Athletic Conference	
Eckerd College	Tritons	St. Petersburg	Florida	Sunshine State Conference	
Embry–Riddle Aeronautical University	Eagles	Daytona Beach	Florida	Sunshine State Conference	
Emmanuel University	Lions	Franklin Springs	Georgia	Conference Carolinas	
Emory and Henry University	Wasps	Emory	Virginia	South Atlantic Conference	
Erskine College	Flying Fleet	Due West	South Carolina	Conference Carolinas	
Ferrum College	Panthers	Ferrum	Virginia	Conference Carolinas	(Note: Transitioning from Division III.)
Felician University	Golden Falcons	Rutherford	New Jersey	Central Atlantic Collegiate Conference	
University of Findlay	Oilers	Findlay	Ohio	Great Midwest Athletic Conference	
Flagler College	Saints	St. Augustine	Florida	Peach Belt Conference	(Note: Flagler will join the Sunshine State Conference beginning with the 2027 season.)
Florida Southern College	Moccasins	Lakeland	Florida	Sunshine State Conference	
Florida Institute of Technology	Panthers	Melbourne	Florida	Sunshine State Conference	
Fort Hays State University	Tigers	Hays	Kansas	Great American Conference	(Note: Fort Hays State, Newman, Northeastern State, Rogers State — GAC affiliate members / Primary: Mid-America Intercollegiate Athletics Association.)
Fort Lewis College	Skyhawks	Durango	Colorado	Rocky Mountain Athletic Conference	
Francis Marion University	Patriots	Florence	South Carolina	Conference Carolinas	
Franklin Pierce University	Ravens	Rindge	New Hampshire	Northeast-10 Conference	
Fresno Pacific University	Sunbirds	Fresno	California	California Collegiate Athletic Association	
Frostburg State University	Bobcats	Frostburg	Maryland	Mountain East Conference	
Gannon University	Golden Knights	Erie	Pennsylvania	Pennsylvania State Athletic Conference	
Georgia Southwestern State University	Hurricanes	Americus	Georgia	Peach Belt Conference	
Georgian Court University	Lions	Lakewood	New Jersey	Central Atlantic Collegiate Conference	
Goldey–Beacom College	Lightning	Pike Creek Valley	Delaware	Central Atlantic Collegiate Conference	
Harding University	Bisons	Searcy	Arkansas	Great American Conference	
Hawai'i Pacific University	Sharks	Honolulu	Hawai'i	Pacific West Conference	
University of Hawai'i at Hilo	Vulcans	Hilo	Hawai'i	Pacific West Conference	
Holy Family University	Tigers	Philadelphia	Pennsylvania	Central Atlantic Collegiate Conference	
University of Illinois at Springfield	Prairie Stars	Springfield	Illinois	Great Lakes Valley Conference	
University of Indianapolis	Greyhounds	Indianapolis	Indiana	Great Lakes Valley Conference	
University of Jamestown	Jimmies	Jamestown	North Dakota	Independent	(Note: Jamestown — Independent / Primary: Northern Sun Intercollegiate Conference. Joining the Great Northwest Athletic Conference as a men's soccer affiliate beginning with the 2027 season.)
Jessup University	Warriors	Rocklin	California	Pacific West Conference	
Kentucky Wesleyan College	Panthers	Owensboro	Kentucky	Great Midwest Athletic Conference	
King University	Tornado	Bristol	Tennessee	Conference Carolinas	
Lake Erie College	Storm	Painesville	Ohio	Great Midwest Athletic Conference	
Lander University	Bearcats	Greenwood	South Carolina	Peach Belt Conference	
Lee University	Flames	Cleveland	Tennessee	Gulf South Conference	
Lees–McRae College	Bobcats	Banner Elk	North Carolina	Conference Carolinas	
Lenoir–Rhyne University	Bears	Hickory	North Carolina	South Atlantic Conference	
Lewis University	Flyers	Romeoville	Illinois	Great Lakes Valley Conference	
Lincoln University	Blue Tigers	Jefferson City	Missouri	Great Lakes Valley Conference	
Lincoln Memorial University	Railsplitters	Harrogate	Tennessee	South Atlantic Conference	
Lubbock Christian University	Chaparrals	Lubbock	Texas	Lone Star Conference	
Lynn University	Fighting Knights	Boca Raton	Florida	Sunshine State Conference	
Malone University	Pioneers	Canton	Ohio	Great Midwest Athletic Conference	
Mars Hill University	Lions	Mars Hill	North Carolina	South Atlantic Conference	
Maryville University	Saints	St. Louis	Missouri	Great Lakes Valley Conference	
McKendree University	Bearcats	Lebanon	Illinois	Great Lakes Valley Conference	
Menlo College	Oaks	Atherton	California	California Collegiate Athletic Association	
Mercy University	Mavericks	Dobbs Ferry	New York	East Coast Conference	
Metropolitan State University of Denver	Roadrunners	Denver	Colorado	Rocky Mountain Athletic Conference	
Middle Georgia State University	Knights	Cochran	Georgia	Peach Belt Conference	(Note: Middle Georgia, Shawnee State — Transitioning from the NAIA.)
Midwestern State University	Mustangs	Wichita Falls	Texas	Lone Star Conference	
Millersville University of Pennsylvania	Marauders	Millersville	Pennsylvania	Pennsylvania State Athletic Conference	
Mississippi Christian University	Choctaws	Clinton	Mississippi	Gulf South Conference	
Missouri University of Science and Technology	Miners	Rolla	Missouri	Great Lakes Valley Conference	
University of Missouri–St. Louis	Tritons	St. Louis	Missouri	Great Lakes Valley Conference	
Molloy University	Lions	Rockville Centre	New York	East Coast Conference	
University of Montevallo	Falcons	Montevallo	Alabama	Gulf South Conference	
University of Mount Olive	Trojans	Mount Olive	North Carolina	Conference Carolinas	
Newberry College	Wolves	Newberry	South Carolina	South Atlantic Conference	
Newman University	Jets	Wichita	Kansas	Great American Conference	
University of North Georgia	Nighthawks	Dahlonega	Georgia	Peach Belt Conference	
North Greenville University	Crusaders	Tigerville	South Carolina	Conference Carolinas	
Northeastern State University	RiverHawks	Tahlequah	Oklahoma	Great American Conference	
Northern Michigan University	Wildcats	Marquette	Michigan	Great Lakes Intercollegiate Athletic Conference	
Northwest Nazarene University	Crusaders	Nampa	Idaho	Great Northwest Athletic Conference	
Northwood University	Timberwolves	Midland	Michigan	Great Midwest Athletic Conference	
Nova Southeastern University	Sharks	Davie	Florida	Sunshine State Conference	
Ohio Dominican University	Panthers	Columbus	Ohio	Great Midwest Athletic Conference	
Oklahoma Christian University	Eagles	Oklahoma City	Oklahoma	Lone Star Conference	
Ouachita Baptist University	Tigers	Arkadelphia	Arkansas	Great American Conference	
Pace University	Setters	Pleasantville	New York	Northeast-10 Conference	
Palm Beach Atlantic University	Sailfish	West Palm Beach	Florida	Sunshine State Conference	
Pennsylvania Western University, California (PennWest California)	Vulcans	California	Pennsylvania	Pennsylvania State Athletic Conference	
University of Pittsburgh at Johnstown	Mountain Cats	Johnstown	Pennsylvania	Pennsylvania State Athletic Conference	
Point Loma Nazarene University	Sea Lions	San Diego	California	Pacific West Conference	
Point Park University	Pioneers	Pittsburgh	Pennsylvania	Mountain East Conference	
Post University	Eagles	Waterbury	Connecticut	Central Atlantic Collegiate Conference	
University of Puerto Rico at Bayamón	Cowboys	Bayamón	Puerto Rico	Independent	
Purdue University Northwest	Pride	Hammond	Indiana	Great Lakes Intercollegiate Athletic Conference	
Queens College	Knights	Flushing	New York	East Coast Conference	
Quincy University	Hawks	Quincy	Illinois	Great Lakes Valley Conference	
Regis University	Rangers	Denver	Colorado	Rocky Mountain Athletic Conference	
Roberts Wesleyan University	Redhawks	North Chili	New York	East Coast Conference	
Rockhurst University	Hawks	Kansas City	Missouri	Great Lakes Valley Conference	
Rogers State University	Hillcats	Claremore	Oklahoma	Great American Conference	
Roosevelt University	Lakers	Chicago	Illinois	Great Lakes Intercollegiate Athletic Conference	
Rollins College	Tars	Winter Park	Florida	Sunshine State Conference	
Saginaw Valley State University	Cardinals	University Center	Michigan	Great Lakes Intercollegiate Athletic Conference	
Saint Anselm College	Hawks	Goffstown	New Hampshire	Northeast-10 Conference	(Note: Transitioning to Division III in the 2027 season, joining the New England Women's and Men's Athletic Conference.)
St. Cloud State University	Huskies	St. Cloud	Minnesota	Great Lakes Intercollegiate Athletic Conference	(Note: St. Cloud State — GLIAC affiliate member / Primary: Northern Sun Intercollegiate Conference.)
Saint Leo University	Lions	St. Leo	Florida	Sunshine State Conference	
Saint Martin's University	Saints	Lacey	Washington	Great Northwest Athletic Conference	
St. Mary's University	Rattlers	San Antonio	Texas	Lone Star Conference	
Saint Michael's College	Purple Knights	Colchester	Vermont	Northeast-10 Conference	
St. Thomas Aquinas College	Spartans	Sparkill	New York	East Coast Conference	
Salem University	Tigers	Salem	West Virginia	Mountain East Conference	(Note: Salem — MEC affiliate member: / Primary: independent. Returning to the NAIA in 2027, joining the River States Conference.)
Seattle Pacific University	Falcons	Seattle	Washington	Great Northwest Athletic Conference	
Seton Hill University	Griffins	Greensburg	Pennsylvania	Pennsylvania State Athletic Conference	
Shaw University	Bears	Raleigh	North Carolina	Independent	(Note: Shaw, Virginia State — Independent / Primary: Central Intercollegiate Athletic Association.) (Note: Shaw will join Conference Carolinas as a men's soccer affiliate beginning with the 2027 season.)
Shawnee State University	Bears	Portsmouth	Ohio	Mountain East Conference	
Shepherd University	Rams	Shepherdstown	West Virginia	Pennsylvania State Athletic Conference	
Shippensburg University of Pennsylvania	Red Raiders	Shippensburg	Pennsylvania	Pennsylvania State Athletic Conference	
Shorter University	Hawks	Rome	Georgia	Conference Carolinas	
Simon Fraser University	Red Leafs	Burnaby	British Columbia	Great Northwest Athletic Conference	(Note: Returning to Canada's equivalent body U Sports in 2027, rejoining the Canada West Universities Athletic Association.)
Slippery Rock University of Pennsylvania	The Rock	Slippery Rock	Pennsylvania	Pennsylvania State Athletic Conference	
University of South Carolina Aiken	Pacers	Aiken	South Carolina	Peach Belt Conference	
South Dakota School of Mines and Technology	Hardrockers	Rapid City	South Dakota	Rocky Mountain Athletic Conference	
Southern Connecticut State University	Fighting Owls	New Haven	Connecticut	Northeast-10 Conference	
Southern Nazarene University	Crimson Storm	Bethany	Oklahoma	Great American Conference	
Southern New Hampshire University	Penmen	Manchester	New Hampshire	Northeast-10 Conference	
Southern Wesleyan University	Warriors	Central	South Carolina	Conference Carolinas	
Southwest Baptist University	Bearcats	Bolivar	Missouri	Great Lakes Valley Conference	
Spring Hill College	Badgers	Mobile	Alabama	Gulf South Conference	(Note: Spring Hill — GSC affiliate member / Primary: Southern Intercollegiate Athletic Conference. Joining the GSC as full member in 2027.)
College of Staten Island	Dolphins	Staten Island	New York	East Coast Conference	
Sul Ross State University	Lobos	Alpine	Texas	Lone Star Conference	
University of Tampa	Spartans	Tampa	Florida	Sunshine State Conference	
Texas A&M International University	Dustdevils	Laredo	Texas	Lone Star Conference	
University of Texas at Dallas	Comets	Richardson	Texas	Lone Star Conference	
University of Texas at Tyler	Patriots	Tyler	Texas	Lone Star Conference	
Thomas Jefferson University (Jefferson)	Rams	Philadelphia	Pennsylvania	Central Atlantic Collegiate Conference	
Thomas More University	Saints	Crestview Hills	Kentucky	Great Midwest Athletic Conference	
Tiffin University	Dragons	Tiffin	Ohio	Great Midwest Athletic Conference	
Trevecca Nazarene University	Trojans	Nashville	Tennessee	Gulf South Conference	
Truman State University	Bulldogs	Kirksville	Missouri	Great Lakes Valley Conference	
Tusculum University	Pioneers	Greeneville	Tennessee	South Atlantic Conference	
Tuskegee University	Tigers	Tuskegee	Alabama	Independent	(Note: Tuskegee — Independent / Primary: Southern Intercollegiate Athletic Conference.)
Union University	Bulldogs	Jackson	Tennessee	Gulf South Conference	
Upper Iowa University	Peacocks	Fayette	Iowa	Great Lakes Valley Conference	
Vanguard University	Lions	Costa Mesa	California	Pacific West Conference	
Virginia State University	Trojans	Ettrick	Virginia	Independent	
Walsh University	Cavaliers	North Canton	Ohio	Great Midwest Athletic Conference	
University of West Alabama	Tigers	Livingston	Alabama	Gulf South Conference	
West Chester University	Golden Rams	West Chester	Pennsylvania	Pennsylvania State Athletic Conference	
West Liberty University	Hilltoppers	West Liberty	West Virginia	Mountain East Conference	
West Texas A&M University	Buffaloes	Canyon	Texas	Lone Star Conference	
West Virginia Wesleyan College	Bobcats	Buckhannon	West Virginia	Mountain East Conference	
Western Oregon University	Wolves	Monmouth	Oregon	Great Northwest Athletic Conference	
Western Washington University	Vikings	Bellingham	Washington	Great Northwest Athletic Conference	
Westminster University	Griffins	Salt Lake City	Utah	Rocky Mountain Athletic Conference	
Westmont College	Warriors	Santa Barbara	California	Pacific West Conference	
Wheeling University	Cardinals	Wheeling	West Virginia	Mountain East Conference	
William Jewell College	Cardinals	Liberty	Missouri	Great Lakes Valley Conference	
Wilmington University	Wildcats	New Castle	Delaware	Central Atlantic Collegiate Conference	
Wingate University	Bulldogs	Wingate	North Carolina	South Atlantic Conference	
University of Wisconsin–Parkside (Parkside)	Rangers	Kenosha	Wisconsin	Great Lakes Intercollegiate Athletic Conference	
Young Harris College	Mountain Lions	Young Harris	Georgia	Conference Carolinas	

== Future Division II men's soccer programs ==
List of institutions scheduled for upward transition to NCAA Division II
School	Nickname	City	State/ province	Future conference	Making transition	Starting	Full membership
Lackawanna College	Falcons	Scranton	Pennsylvania	Pennsylvania State Athletic Conference	NJCAA to Div. II	2027	2029 or 2030
Monroe University	Mustangs	New Rochelle	New York	Central Atlantic Collegiate Conference	NJCAA to Div. II	2027	2029 or 2030
Texas A&M University–Texarkana	Eagles	Texarkana	Texas	Lone Star Conference	NAIA to Div. II	2027	2029 or 2030
Texas Wesleyan University	Rams	Fort Worth	Texas	Lone Star Conference	NAIA to Div. II	2028	2030 or 2031

== See also ==
- List of NCAA Division II institutions
- List of NCAA Division II women's soccer programs
- List of NCAA Division II football programs
- List of NCAA Division II baseball programs
- List of NCAA Division II lacrosse programs
- List of NCAA Division II men's basketball programs
- List of NCAA Division II men's wrestling programs
