= NCAA Division II =

Intermediate-level division of competition in college sports

NCAA Division II logo

NCAA Division II (D-II) is the intermediate-level division of competition in the National Collegiate Athletic Association (NCAA). It offers an alternative to both the larger and better-funded Division I and to the scholarship-free environment offered in Division III.

Before 1973, the NCAA's smaller schools were grouped together in the College Division. In 1973, the College Division split in two when the NCAA began using numeric designations for its competitions. The College Division members who wanted to offer athletic scholarships or compete against those who did became Division II, while those who chose not to offer athletic scholarships became Division III.

Nationally, ESPN2 and ESPN+ televises the championship game in football, CBS and Paramount+ televises the men's basketball championship, and ESPN+ televises both the women's basketball and women's volleyball championships.

The official slogan of NCAA Division II, implemented in 2015, is "Make It Yours." The NCAA argues that Division II offers a "balanced" approach to student athletics, providing a high level of competition with regional championships that require less travel and cost and more access to championships than the other divisions. For athletes, Division II mandates a mandatory day off from athletic activities per week; this requirement was eliminated from Division I in 2018.

== Membership ==
There are currently 303 full, seven reclassifying and two provisional members of Division II. Division II schools tend to be public universities with fewer than 15,000 students and many are private institutions. A large minority of Division II institutions (91 schools / 30%) have fewer than 2,499 students. Only 18 institutions have more than 15,000 undergraduates, and only five have more than 25,000, led by Simon Fraser University. Eighty-nine percent of Division II institutions have fewer than 7,500 students.

Division II has a diverse membership, with two active member institutions in Alaska and three in Hawaii. Additionally, it is the only division that has member institutions in Puerto Rico and the only division that has expanded its membership to include an international member institution. Simon Fraser University became the first institution outside the US to enter the NCAA membership process. This occurred after the Division II Membership Committee accepted the institution's application during a July 7–9 meeting in Indianapolis, Indiana. Simon Fraser, located in the Vancouver suburb of Burnaby, British Columbia, began a two-year candidacy period September 1, 2009. Prospective members also must complete at least one year of provisional status before being accepted as full-time Division II members. In the fall of 2012, the NCAA President's Council officially approved Simon Fraser University as the organization's first international member. In April 2017, the NCAA made permanent the pilot program under which Simon Fraser was admitted to the NCAA, allowing each division to determine whether to allow Canadian or Mexican schools to join. In January 2018, Division II became the first NCAA division to officially allow Mexican schools to apply for membership, provided that they meet the same standards as US-based D-II members, including US regional accreditation. At the time, Centro de Enseñanza Técnica y Superior (CETYS), which is fully accredited in both the U.S. and Mexico, was seeking to become the first Mexican school to join the NCAA with the backing of the California Collegiate Athletic Association. However, as of 2024, neither CETYS nor the NCAA has made any further announcements regarding such a move.

== Overview ==
=== Men's team sports ===
Number	Sport	Teams	Conferences	Scholarships per team	Season	Most championships
1	Football	164	16	36.0	Fall	Northwest Missouri State (6)
2	Basketball	306	24	10.0	Winter	Kentucky Wesleyan (8)
3	Baseball	256	24	9.0	Spring	Tampa (10)
4	Soccer	206	19	9.0	Fall	Southern Connecticut (6)
5	Lacrosse	75	10	10.8	Spring	Adelphi (7)
6	Volleyball (Note: Championships are combined with Division I.)	43	8 (Note: As of the ongoing 2026 season (2025–26 school year), 9 conferences in all sponsor men's volleyball at the National Collegiate (Divisions I and II) level. Of these conferences, one (the Big West Conference) consists entirely of D-I members and thus is not included in the count of 8. Four conferences consist of a mix of D-I and D-II members, and four consist solely of D-II members.)	4.5	Spring	UCLA (20)
7	Water polo	8	4	4.5	Fall	California (13)

Notes

Sports are ranked according to total possible scholarships (number of teams × number of scholarships per team). Since all Division II sports are considered equivalency sports (as opposed to the "head-count" status of several Division I sports: men's and women's basketball, FBS football, women's gymnastics, women's tennis, women's [indoor] volleyball), all scholarship numbers are indicated with a decimal point, with a trailing zero if needed.

=== Men's individual sports ===
No.	Sport	Teams	Athletes	Season
1	Track (outdoor)	223	7,555	Spring
2	Track (indoor)	173	6,289	Winter
3	Cross country	275	3,640	Fall
4	Swimming & diving	75	1,619	Winter
5	Golf	227	2,353	Spring
6	Tennis	167	1,617	Spring
7	Wrestling	70	1,884	Winter

=== Women's team sports ===
No.	Sport	Teams	Conferences	Scholarships per team	Season	Most championships
1	Basketball	306	24	10.0	Winter	Cal Poly Pomona and North Dakota State (5)
2	Soccer	259	21	9.9	Fall	Grand Valley State (6)
3	Volleyball	295	24	8.0	Fall	Concordia St. Paul (8)
4	Softball	283	24	7.2	Spring	Cal State Northridge (4)
5	Lacrosse	111	24	9.9	Spring	Adelphi (8)
6	Rowing	16	24	20.0	Spring	Western Washington (8)
7	Field Hockey	36	24	6.3	Fall	Bloomsburg (13)
8	Water Polo*	12	6	8.0	Spring	UCLA (7)

* Championships are combined with D-I

=== Women's individual sports ===
No.	Sport	Teams	Athletes	Season
1	Track (outdoor)	255	7,530	Spring
2	Track (indoor)	202	6,399	Winter
3	Cross country	300	3,829	Fall
4	Swimming & diving	104	2,101	Winter
5	Golf	198	1,547	Spring
6	Tennis	223	1,901	Spring
7	Gymnastics	7	148	Winter

=== National Championships Festival ===
Another feature unique to Division II is what the NCAA calls the "National Championships Festival"—an annual event, explicitly modeled after the Olympics, in which a single city hosts national championship finals in multiple sports over a period of several days. Each festival has formal opening and closing ceremonies, and competitors are housed in a centrally located hotel, allowing a village-like experience. The first such festival was held in Orlando, Florida in 2004 for spring sports. It became an annual event in the 2006–07 school year, and has been held each school year since with the exception of 2009–10 and 2021 and 2022 (due to the COVID-19 pandemic). Since the current annual cycle began in 2006–07, the event has rotated between featuring fall, spring, and winter sports, in that order (the cycling was not interrupted by the one-year hiatus). In 2025, the NCAA Division II executive board voted to end the concept after the 2026 fall festival in Kansas City.

== Requirements ==
Division II institutions have to sponsor at least five sports for men and five for women (or four for men and six for women), with two team sports for each sex, and each playing season represented by each sex. Teams that consist of both men and women are counted as men's teams for sports sponsorship purposes. There are contest and participant minimums for each sport, as well as scheduling criteria—football and men's and women's basketball teams must play at least 50 percent of their games against Division II or Football Bowl Subdivision (formerly Division I-A) or Football Championship Subdivision (formerly Division I-AA) opponents. For sports other than football and basketball there are no scheduling requirements, as long as each contest involves full varsity teams. The only NCAA sport in which contests against club teams can count toward a team's contest minimum is women's rugby, in which two such contests per school year can be counted. There are not attendance requirements for football, nor arena size requirements for basketball. There are maximum financial aid awards for each sport, as well as a separate limit on financial aid awards in men's sports, that a Division II school must not exceed. Division II teams usually feature a number of local or in-state student-athletes. Many Division II student-athletes pay for school through a combination of scholarship money, grants, student loans and employment earnings. Division II athletics programs are financed in the institution's budget like other academic departments on campus. Traditional rivalries with regional institutions dominate schedules of many Division II athletics programs.

Athletic scholarships are offered in most sponsored sports at most institutions, but with more stringent limits as to the numbers offered in any one sport than at the Division I level. For example, Division II schools may give financial aid in football equivalent to 36 full scholarships (whereas each school in Division I FBS, the highest level, is allowed 85 individuals receiving financial aid for football), although some Division II conferences limit the number of scholarships to a lower level. Division II scholarship programs are frequently the recipients of student-athletes transferring from Division I schools; a transfer student does not have to sit out a year before resuming sports participation as would usually be the case in the event of transferring from one Division I institution to another. Several exceptions to this rule currently exist, of which three are the most significant. First, football players transferring from a Division I FBS school to a Division I FCS school do not have to sit out a year, provided that the player has at least two remaining seasons of athletic eligibility. The same also applies to players transferring from scholarship-granting FCS schools to non-scholarship FCS schools. (Note: Most FCS members award football scholarships, but the following programs do not award football scholarships: Members of the Ivy League, which prohibits its members from awarding athletic scholarships in any sport.; Members of the Pioneer Football League, a football-only league that also bans athletic scholarships (though only in that sport).; Georgetown, which chose to remain a non-scholarship football program after its football home of the Patriot League began allowing football scholarships in 2013.) Second, a first-time transfer does not have to sit out a year, provided that the player's former institution grants a scholarship release. Before the 2021–22 school year, this applied to sports other than football, baseball, men's and women's basketball, and men's ice hockey; it was extended to the remaining sports effective in 2021–22. Additionally, student-athletes in any sport who complete a bachelor's degree and still have athletic eligibility remaining can transfer to another school and be immediately eligible, provided that they enroll in a separate degree program (whether graduate, undergraduate, or professional) at the new institution. There are also some restrictions with transferring to another school for the same sport in the same conference.

== Conferences ==
- California Collegiate Athletic Association (Note: Non-football conferences)
- Central Atlantic Collegiate Conference
- Central Intercollegiate Athletic Association (Note: Conferences that sponsor football)
- Conference Carolinas
- East Coast Conference
- Great American Conference
- Great Lakes Intercollegiate Athletic Conference
- Great Lakes Valley Conference
- Great Midwest Athletic Conference
- Great Northwest Athletic Conference
- Gulf South Conference
- Lone Star Conference
- Mid-America Intercollegiate Athletics Association
- Mountain East Conference
- Northeast-10 Conference
- Northern Sun Intercollegiate Conference
- Pacific West Conference
- Peach Belt Conference
- Pennsylvania State Athletic Conference
- Rocky Mountain Athletic Conference
- South Atlantic Conference
- Southern Intercollegiate Athletic Conference
- Sunshine State Conference

Notes

The newest D-II conference is the Mountain East Conference, formed in 2012 after the football-sponsoring schools in the West Virginia Intercollegiate Athletic Conference (WVIAC) announced that they would leave to form a new league, a move that led to the demise of the WVIAC. The Mountain East was approved by the NCAA Division II Membership Committee in February 2013, and became an official conference on September 1 of that year.

The most recent change to the roster of D-II conferences was the demise of the Heartland Conference at the end of the 2018–19 school year. In August 2017, eight of its nine members announced a mass exodus to the Lone Star Conference (LSC). The remaining Heartland member, Newman University, announced in February 2018 that it would become a de facto member of the Mid-America Intercollegiate Athletics Association (MIAA) at that time. Newman technically became an associate member because it does not sponsor football, a mandatory sport for full MIAA members, but now houses all of its varsity sports in that league. One of the eight schools that originally announced a move to the LSC, Rogers State University, later changed course and instead chose to follow Newman into de facto MIAA membership (like Newman, and indeed all other Heartland members, Rogers State does not sponsor football). Newman and Rogers State were eventually granted full membership in the league on July 1, 2022.

A more recent change saw the Great Northwest Athletic Conference (GNAC) drop football after the 2021–22 school year. Over time, the GNAC saw most of its football-playing schools drop the sport, and it entered into a football scheduling alliance for 2020 and 2021 with the Lone Star Conference (LSC). The alliance was further extended for 2022 and 2023, by which time the GNAC football membership had dropped to three, but was superseded when the three GNAC schools became football-only LSC members effective in 2022.

=== Independents ===
- Division II Independent schools

== Scholarship limits by sport ==
The NCAA imposes limits on the total financial aid each Division II member may award in each sport that the school sponsors. All Division II sports are classified as "equivalency" sports, meaning that the NCAA restricts the total financial aid that a school can offer in a given sport to the equivalent of a set number of full scholarships. This differs from Division I, in which some sports are "head-count" sports in which the NCAA limits the total number of individuals who can receive athletic aid. In another practice that differs from Division I, Division II members are limited to a combined total of 60 scholarship equivalents for men's sports apart from football and basketball.

Scholarship limits in bold are identical to those for Division I members in the same sport for the same sex. Most, but not all, of these sports have a single championship open to schools from all divisions (for example bowling and rifle), or a combined Division I/II national championship and a separate Division III championship (as in women's ice hockey and men's volleyball). Examples of sports with identical scholarship numbers in the two divisions, but separate national championships for each, include men's cross-country and women's rowing.

In sports that conduct "National Collegiate" championships open to schools from multiple divisions, Division II schools are allowed to award the same number of scholarships as Division I members. If the Division I scholarship limit is higher than the Division II limit, the D-II member must annually file a declaration of intent to compete under Division I rules with the NCAA prior to June 1.

Additionally, if the NCAA sponsors a Division I championship but not a Division II championship in a given sport, D-II members are allowed to compete in the D-I championship, and are also allowed to operate under D-I scholarship limits. An example of this situation can be seen in men's ice hockey, which has not had a Division II championship in the 21st century. Several full members of the Northeast-10 Conference, plus men's hockey-only member Post University, compete under Division II scholarship limits; other Division II schools with programs in that sport choose to play as Division I programs under the higher Division I scholarship limits.

The NCAA classifies teams that consist of both men and women as men's teams for purposes of sports sponsorship and D-II limitations on total scholarships. Three NCAA sports are open to competitors of both sexes. In rifle, not only is there a single team championship for all divisions, but men and women compete as equals. Fencing and skiing also have single team championships, but schools have separate men's and women's squads, with all bouts or races involving members of a single sex, and the NCAA has separate men's and women's scholarship limits in both sports.

Sport	Men's	Women's
Acrobatics & tumbling	–	9.0
Baseball	9.0	–
Basketball	10.0	10.0
Beach volleyball	–	5.0
Bowling	–	**5.0**
Cross-country/track & field	**12.6** (Note: Schools that do not sponsor men's indoor or outdoor track, but do sponsor men's cross-country, are allowed 5.0 equivalents.)	12.6 (Note: Schools that do not sponsor women's indoor or outdoor track, but do sponsor women's cross-country, are allowed 6.0 equivalents.)
Equestrian	–	**15.0**
Fencing	**4.5**	4.5
Field hockey	–	6.3
Football	36.0	–
Golf	3.6	5.4
Gymnastics	5.4	6.0
Ice hockey	13.5	**18.0**
Lacrosse	10.8	9.9
Rifle	**3.6**	–
Rowing	–	**20.0**
Rugby	–	**12.0**
Skiing	**6.3**	6.3
Soccer	9.0	9.9
Softball	–	7.2
Stunt	–	**9.0**
Swimming and diving	8.1	8.1
Tennis	**4.5**	6.0
Triathlon	–	5.0
Volleyball	**4.5**	8.0
Water polo	**4.5**	**8.0**
Wrestling	9.0	**10.0**

== Interaction with other divisions ==
The NCAA does not strictly prevent its member institutions from playing outside of their own division, or indeed playing against schools that are not members of the NCAA.

=== NAIA ===
Many Division II schools frequently schedule matches against members of the National Association of Intercollegiate Athletics (NAIA), which consists of colleges and universities that offer athletic scholarships similar to NCAA Division II across the United States and Canada. They promote competitive and character-based athletics that is controlled by its NAIA membership, as opposed to the NCAA that serves as a regulating body.

=== Division I ===
Division II schools also frequently schedule "money games", usually in football and men's basketball, against Division I schools.

In football, D-II teams once occasionally played games against schools that are now in Division I FBS, but this practice has ended because, under current NCAA rules, FBS schools cannot use victories over schools below the FCS level for establishing a bowl eligibility. Today, D-II "money games" are exclusively against FCS schools, whose postseason eligibility is less seriously impacted by scheduling a D-II opponent. In basketball, where conference tournaments play a large role in determining postseason participants, D-I schools have less of a penalty for scheduling an occasional D-II opponent, resulting in more "money games".

In any event, the D-II school is almost invariably the visiting team, and is invited to play with the knowledge that it will likely be defeated but will receive a substantial (at least by Division II standards) monetary reward which will help to finance much of the rest of the season and perhaps other sports as well. Such games are funded by Division I schools that can afford such games.

In recent years, "money games" in men's basketball have also included preseason exhibitions against D-I programs, typically in the same region, that do not count in official statistics for either team. Under NCAA rules, Division I teams are allowed to play two exhibition games in a season and must host these games.

The University of Kansas helps the state's four Division II members by rotating them onto the Jayhawks' exhibition schedule annually. Milwaukee, which has been a Division I member since 1990, has continued its series with their former Division II rival Parkside as part of their exhibition schedule.

When these exhibition games do happen, there are times when the Division II team does win, and against a well-respected Division I program. In 2009, a Division II team beat the eventual Big East regular season champion. In 2010, two other Division II teams beat teams that reached the NCAA Division I tournament. In 2011, another Division II team defeated a Division I team that finished in the top half of the Pac-12 Conference. In 2012, another Division II team beat eventual Atlantic Coast Conference regular-season and tournament champion Miami. Additionally, in 2025, Division II team Hawai'i Pacific defeated Division I team Boise State.

Also in basketball, one of the best-known early-season tournaments for D-I men's teams, the Maui Invitational, is hosted by D-II member Chaminade. Through the 2017 edition, Chaminade competed in every tournament, but now competes only in odd-numbered years. The Great Alaska Shootout, which had men's and still has women's tournaments, is also hosted by a D-II member, Alaska–Anchorage. Chaminade typically loses all games it plays in Maui; Alaska–Anchorage also typically lost all of its men's Shootout games, but is frequently competitive in the women's version.

=== Non-revenue sports competition ===
Matches between the different collegiate divisions in non-revenue sports are often quite competitive. Indeed, in some sports, among them ice hockey and men's volleyball, there is no Division II national championship. In hockey, many schools whose athletic programs are otherwise Division II compete in Division I, and men's volleyball has a truncated divisional structure with a Division III championship but no Division II championship. In any sport that does not have a Division II national championship, Division II members were allowed to award the same number of scholarships as Division I members before 2025–26, when D-I scholarship limits were replaced by roster limits following the settlement of the House v. NCAA legal case. One D-II conference, the East Coast Conference, features D-I Bryant as an associate member in bowling, a sport with a single NCAA championship event open to all divisions. A similar situation exists with respect to flag football, which entered the NCAA Emerging Sports for Women program in January 2026. The D-II Conference Carolinas features D-I Mount St. Mary's as an associate member in that sport.

An earlier example is that at least during the 1970s, NCAA golf tournaments in California were usually played with Division I and Division II schools competing together in one group. Sometimes, Division II schools won those tournaments. Additionally, matches involving two or four schools were common among schools from these two divisions.

== See also ==
- List of NCAA Division II institutions
- List of NCAA Division II football programs
- List of NCAA Division II basketball arenas
