= List of NCAA Division II institutions =

Map of NCAA Division II institutions.

There are 300 American, Canadian, and Puerto Rican colleges and universities classified as Division II for NCAA competition during the 2026–27 academic year, including four schools that are in the process of reclassifying to Division II. Forty-four of the 50 U.S. states, plus the District of Columbia, the commonwealth of Puerto Rico, and the Canadian province of British Columbia are represented. Arizona, Louisiana, Maine, Nevada, Rhode Island, and Wyoming do not currently have D-II institutions, although a Louisiana-based institution has announced plans to transition to D-II by 2027.

NCAA Division II is the smallest division in the NCAA by school count.

== Division II institutions ==
=== Full members ===
List of NCAA Division II institutions
School	Nickname	City	State/ Province	Enrollment	Conference
Adams State University	Grizzlies	Alamosa	CO	3,007	Rocky Mountain Athletic Conference
Adelphi University	Panthers	Garden City	NY	7,603	Northeast-10 Conference
University of Alabama in Huntsville	Chargers	Huntsville	AL	8,564	Gulf South Conference
University of Alaska Anchorage	Seawolves	Anchorage	AK	10,687	Great Northwest Athletic Conference
University of Alaska Fairbanks	Nanooks	Fairbanks	AK	7,451	Great Northwest Athletic Conference
Albany State University	Golden Rams	Albany	GA	6,809	Southern Intercollegiate Athletic Conference
Allen University	Yellow Jackets	Columbia	SC	657	Southern Intercollegiate Athletic Conference
American International College	Yellow Jackets	Springfield	MA	2,010	Northeast-10 Conference
Anderson University	Trojans	Anderson	SC	4,519	South Atlantic Conference
Angelo State University	Rams	San Angelo	TX	11,542	Lone Star Conference
Arkansas Tech University	Wonder Boys & Golden Suns	Russellville	AR	8,746	Great American Conference
University of Arkansas–Fort Smith	Lions	Fort Smith	AR	5,463	Mid-America Intercollegiate Athletics Association
University of Arkansas at Monticello	Boll Weevils & Cotton Blossoms	Monticello	AR	2,856	Great American Conference
Ashland University	Eagles	Ashland	OH	6,433	Great Midwest Athletic Conference
Assumption University	Greyhounds	Worcester	MA	2,044	Northeast-10 Conference
Auburn University at Montgomery	Warhawks	Montgomery	AL	5,189	Gulf South Conference
Augusta University	Jaguars	Augusta	GA	11,584	Peach Belt Conference
Augustana University	Vikings	Sioux Falls	SD	2,158	Northern Sun Intercollegiate Conference
Barry University	Buccaneers	Miami Shores	FL	6,825	Sunshine State Conference
Barton College	Bulldogs	Wilson	NC	1,235	Conference Carolinas
Belmont Abbey College	Crusaders	Belmont	NC	1,687	Conference Carolinas
Bemidji State University	Beavers	Bemidji	MN	4,076	Northern Sun Intercollegiate Conference
Benedict College	Tigers	Columbia	SC	1,746	Southern Intercollegiate Athletic Conference
Bentley University	Falcons	Waltham	MA	4,526	Northeast-10 Conference
Biola University	Eagles	La Mirada	CA	5,448	Pacific West Conference
Black Hills State University	Yellow Jackets	Spearfish	SD	3,346	Rocky Mountain Athletic Conference
Bluefield State University	Big Blues & Lady Blues	Bluefield	WV	1,313	Central Intercollegiate Athletic Association
Bowie State University	Bulldogs	Bowie	MD	6,353	Central Intercollegiate Athletic Association
University of Bridgeport	Purple Knights	Bridgeport	CT	3,838	Central Atlantic Collegiate Conference
Caldwell University	Cougars	Caldwell	NJ	2,193	Central Atlantic Collegiate Conference
PennWest California	Vulcans	California	PA	2,717	Pennsylvania State Athletic Conference
California State Polytechnic University, Humboldt	Lumberjacks	Arcata	CA	6,045	California Collegiate Athletic Association
California State Polytechnic University, Pomona	Broncos	Pomona	CA	27,196	California Collegiate Athletic Association
California State University, Chico	Wildcats	Chico	CA	13,504	California Collegiate Athletic Association
California State University, Dominguez Hills	Toros	Carson	CA	14,299	California Collegiate Athletic Association
California State University, East Bay	Pioneers	Hayward	CA	12,323	California Collegiate Athletic Association
California State University, Los Angeles	Golden Eagles	Los Angeles	CA	22,740	California Collegiate Athletic Association
California State University, Monterey Bay	Otters	Seaside	CA	7,713	California Collegiate Athletic Association
California State University, San Bernardino	Coyotes	San Bernardino	CA	17,900	California Collegiate Athletic Association
California State University, San Marcos	Cougars	San Marcos	CA	14,999	California Collegiate Athletic Association
California State University, Stanislaus	Warriors	Turlock	CA	9,295	California Collegiate Athletic Association
Cameron University	Aggies	Lawton	OK	3,559	Lone Star Conference
Carson–Newman University	Eagles	Jefferson City	TN	2,585	South Atlantic Conference
Catawba College	Indians	Salisbury	NC	1,241	South Atlantic Conference
Cedarville University	Yellow Jackets	Cedarville	OH	6,384	Great Midwest Athletic Conference
University of Central Missouri	Mules & Jennies	Warrensburg	MO	12,857	Mid-America Intercollegiate Athletics Association
University of Central Oklahoma	Bronchos	Edmond	OK	12,554	Mid-America Intercollegiate Athletics Association
Central State University	Marauders & Lady Marauders	Wilberforce	OH	2,719	Southern Intercollegiate Athletic Conference
Central Washington University	Wildcats	Ellensburg	WA	8,297	Great Northwest Athletic Conference
Chadron State College	Eagles	Chadron	NE	2,098	Rocky Mountain Athletic Conference
Chaminade University of Honolulu	Silverswords	Honolulu	HI	2,369	Pacific West Conference
University of Charleston	Golden Eagles	Charleston	WV	3,051	Mountain East Conference
Chestnut Hill College	Griffins	Philadelphia	PA	1,417	Central Atlantic Collegiate Conference
Chowan University	Hawks	Murfreesboro	NC	708	Conference Carolinas
Christian Brothers University (Note: Christian Brothers will transition back to the NAIA at the end of the 2026–27 athletic season.)	Buccaneers & Lady Buccaneers	Memphis	TN	1,813	Gulf South Conference
Claflin University	Panthers	Orangeburg	SC	1,960	Central Intercollegiate Athletic Association
PennWest Clarion	Golden Eagles	Clarion	PA	1,743	Pennsylvania State Athletic Conference
Clark Atlanta University	Panthers	Atlanta	GA	4,252	Southern Intercollegiate Athletic Conference
Clayton State University	Lakers	Morrow	GA	6,172	Peach Belt Conference
Coker University	Cobras	Hartsville	SC	1,263	South Atlantic Conference
Colorado Christian University	Cougars	Lakewood	CO	10,563	Rocky Mountain Athletic Conference
Colorado Mesa University	Mavericks	Grand Junction	CO	10,139	Rocky Mountain Athletic Conference
Colorado School of Mines	Orediggers	Golden	CO	7,608	Rocky Mountain Athletic Conference
Colorado State University–Pueblo	ThunderWolves	Pueblo	CO	3,716	Rocky Mountain Athletic Conference
University of Colorado Colorado Springs	Mountain Lions	Colorado Springs	CO	11,213	Rocky Mountain Athletic Conference
Columbus State University	Cougars	Columbus	GA	7,937	Peach Belt Conference
Commonwealth University-Bloomsburg	Huskies	Bloomsburg	PA	7,206	Pennsylvania State Athletic Conference
Commonwealth University-Lock Haven	Bald Eagles	Lock Haven	PA	2,702	Pennsylvania State Athletic Conference
Commonwealth University-Mansfield (Note: Commonwealth University's Mansfield campus set to close by June 30, 2028.)	Mountaineers	Mansfield	PA	1,195	Pennsylvania State Athletic Conference
Concord University	Mountain Lions	Athens	WV	1,943	Mountain East Conference
Concordia University–Irvine	Golden Eagles	Irvine	CA	3,522	Pacific West Conference
Concordia University–St. Paul	Golden Bears	St. Paul	MN	5,928	Northern Sun Intercollegiate Conference
Converse University	Valkyries	Spartanburg	SC	1,967	Conference Carolinas
Daemen University	Wildcats	Amherst	NY	2,540	East Coast Conference
Dallas Baptist University (Note: The school does not sponsor women's basketball.)	Patriots	Dallas	TX	4,157	Lone Star Conference
Davenport University	Panthers	Grand Rapids	MI	4,848	Great Lakes Intercollegiate Athletic Conference
Davis & Elkins College	Senators	Elkins	WV	683	Mountain East Conference
Delta State University	Statesmen & Lady Statesmen	Cleveland	MS	2,654	Gulf South Conference
University of the District of Columbia	Firebirds	Washington	DC	4,202	East Coast Conference
Dominican University of California	Penguins	San Rafael	CA	1,818	Pacific West Conference
Dominican University New York	Chargers	Orangeburg	NY	1,083	Central Atlantic Collegiate Conference
Drury University	Panthers	Springfield	MO	2,268	Great Lakes Valley Conference
D'Youville University	Saints	Buffalo	NY	2,376	East Coast Conference
East Central University	Tigers	Ada	OK	3,935	Great American Conference
East Stroudsburg University	Warriors	East Stroudsburg	PA	5,636	Pennsylvania State Athletic Conference
Eastern New Mexico University	Greyhounds	Portales	NM	5,737	Lone Star Conference
Eckerd College	Tritons	St. Petersburg	FL	1,893	Sunshine State Conference
PennWest Edinboro	Fighting Scots	Edinboro	PA	2,259	Pennsylvania State Athletic Conference
Edward Waters University	Tigers	Jacksonville	FL	1,177	Southern Intercollegiate Athletic Conference
Elizabeth City State University	Vikings	Elizabeth City	NC	2,261	Central Intercollegiate Athletic Association
Embry–Riddle Aeronautical University	Eagles	Daytona Beach	FL	8,755	Sunshine State Conference
Emmanuel University	Lions	Franklin Springs	GA	932	Conference Carolinas
Emory & Henry University	Wasps	Emory	VA	1,292	South Atlantic Conference
Emporia State University	Hornets	Emporia	KS	4,557	Mid-America Intercollegiate Athletics Association
Erskine College	Flying Fleet	Due West	SC	1,132	Conference Carolinas
Fairmont State University	Fighting Falcons	Fairmont	WV	3,325	Mountain East Conference
Fayetteville State University	Broncos & Lady Broncos	Fayetteville	NC	7,113	Central Intercollegiate Athletic Association
Felician University	Golden Falcons	Rutherford	NJ	2,427	Central Atlantic Collegiate Conference
Ferris State University	Bulldogs	Big Rapids	MI	9,877	Great Lakes Intercollegiate Athletic Conference
University of Findlay	Oilers	Findlay	OH	5,057	Great Midwest Athletic Conference
Flagler College	Saints	St. Augustine	FL	2,530	Peach Belt Conference (Sunshine State Conference in 2027)
Florida Southern College	Moccasins	Lakeland	FL	2,915	Sunshine State Conference
Florida Institute of Technology	Panthers	Melbourne	FL	7,223	Sunshine State Conference
Fort Hays State University	Tigers	Hays	KS	12,843	Mid-America Intercollegiate Athletics Association
Fort Lewis College	Skyhawks	Durango	CO	3,544	Rocky Mountain Athletic Conference
Fort Valley State University	Wildcats	Fort Valley	GA	2,905	Southern Intercollegiate Athletic Conference
Francis Marion University	Patriots	Florence	SC	4,261	Conference Carolinas
Franklin Pierce University	Ravens	Rindge	NH	1,172	Northeast-10 Conference
Fresno Pacific University	Sunbirds	Fresno	CA	2,889	California Collegiate Athletic Association
Frostburg State University	Bobcats	Frostburg	MD	3,422	Mountain East Conference
Gannon University	Golden Knights	Erie	PA	4,665	Pennsylvania State Athletic Conference
Georgia College & State University	Bobcats	Milledgeville	GA	7,097	Peach Belt Conference
Georgia Southwestern State University	Hurricanes	Americus	GA	3,704	Peach Belt Conference
Georgian Court University	Lions	Lakewood	NJ	1,910	Central Atlantic Collegiate Conference
Glenville State University	Pioneers	Glenville	WV	1,772	Mountain East Conference
Goldey–Beacom College	Lightning	Pike Creek Valley	DE	1,074	Central Atlantic Collegiate Conference
Grand Valley State University	Lakers	Allendale	MI	21,382	Great Lakes Intercollegiate Athletic Conference
Harding University	Bisons & Lady Bisons	Searcy	AR	4,608	Great American Conference
Hawai'i Pacific University	Sharks	Honolulu	HI	4,748	Pacific West Conference
University of Hawai'i at Hilo	Vulcans	Hilo	HI	2,781	Pacific West Conference
Henderson State University	Reddies	Arkadelphia	AR	2,061	Great American Conference
Hillsdale College	Chargers	Hillsdale	MI	1,573	Great Midwest Athletic Conference
Holy Family University	Tigers	Philadelphia	PA	3,278	Central Atlantic Collegiate Conference
University of Illinois at Springfield	Prairie Stars	Springfield	IL	4,628	Great Lakes Valley Conference
Indiana University of Pennsylvania	Crimson Hawks	Indiana	PA	9,081	Pennsylvania State Athletic Conference
University of Indianapolis	Greyhounds	Indianapolis	IN	5,447	Great Lakes Valley Conference (Great Midwest Athletic Conference in 2027)
University of Jamestown	Jimmies	Jamestown	ND	1,372	Northern Sun Intercollegiate Conference
Thomas Jefferson University	Rams	Philadelphia	PA	8,315	Central Atlantic Collegiate Conference
Jessup University	Warriors	Rocklin	CA	1,484	Pacific West Conference
Johnson C. Smith University	Golden Bulls	Charlotte	NC	1,302	Central Intercollegiate Athletic Association
Kentucky State University	Thorobreds & Thorobrettes	Frankfort	KY	1,932	Southern Intercollegiate Athletic Conference
Kentucky Wesleyan College	Panthers	Owensboro	KY	864	Great Midwest Athletic Conference
King University	Tornados	Bristol	TN	1,295	Conference Carolinas
Kutztown University	Golden Bears	Kutztown	PA	7,468	Pennsylvania State Athletic Conference
Lake Erie College	Storm	Painesville	OH	1,236	Great Midwest Athletic Conference
Lake Superior State University	Lakers	Sault Ste. Marie	MI	1,232	Great Lakes Intercollegiate Athletic Conference
Lander University	Bearcats	Greenwood	SC	4,423	Peach Belt Conference
Lane College	Dragons	Jackson	TN	822	Southern Intercollegiate Athletic Conference
Lee University	Flames	Cleveland	TN	3,714	Gulf South Conference
Lees–McRae College	Bobcats	Banner Elk	NC	917	Conference Carolinas
LeMoyne–Owen College	Magicians	Memphis	TN	613	Southern Intercollegiate Athletic Conference
Lenoir–Rhyne University	Bears	Hickory	NC	2,255	South Atlantic Conference
Lewis University	Flyers	Romeoville	IL	6,636	Great Lakes Valley Conference
Lincoln University (MO)	Blue Tigers	Jefferson City	MO	2,093	Great Lakes Valley Conference
Lincoln University (PA)	Lions	Lincoln University (Note: Lincoln University's mailing address is located in the census-designated place of Lincoln University, approximately 4 miles northeast of the nearest borough of Oxford.)	PA	1,848	Central Intercollegiate Athletic Association
Lincoln Memorial University	Railsplitters	Harrogate	TN	6,081	South Atlantic Conference
Livingstone College	Blue Bears	Salisbury	NC	814	Central Intercollegiate Athletic Association
Lubbock Christian University	Chaparrals & Lady Chaps	Lubbock	TX	1,595	Lone Star Conference
Lynn University	Fighting Knights	Boca Raton	FL	3,520	Sunshine State Conference
Malone University	Pioneers	Canton	OH	1,268	Great Midwest Athletic Conference
Mars Hill University	Lions	Mars Hill	NC	1,049	South Atlantic Conference
University of Mary	Marauders	Bismarck	ND	3,801	Northern Sun Intercollegiate Conference
Maryville University	Saints	Town and Country (Note: Maryville's primary campus is located in Town and Country, but its mailing address is St. Louis.)	MO	9,250	Great Lakes Valley Conference
McKendree University	Bearcats	Lebanon	IL	2,442	Great Lakes Valley Conference
Menlo College	Oaks	Atherton	CA	810	California Collegiate Athletic Association
Mercy University	Mavericks	Dobbs Ferry	NY	8,774	East Coast Conference
Metropolitan State University of Denver	Roadrunners	Denver	CO	17,782	Rocky Mountain Athletic Conference
Michigan Technological University	Huskies	Houghton	MI	7,054	Great Lakes Intercollegiate Athletic Conference
Midwestern State University	Mustangs	Wichita Falls	TX	5,324	Lone Star Conference
Miles College	Golden Bears	Fairfield	AL	1,489	Southern Intercollegiate Athletic Conference
Millersville University	Marauders	Millersville	PA	7,009	Pennsylvania State Athletic Conference
Minnesota State University, Mankato	Mavericks	Mankato	MN	14,709	Northern Sun Intercollegiate Conference
Minnesota State University Moorhead	Dragons	Moorhead	MN	5,547	Northern Sun Intercollegiate Conference
University of Minnesota Crookston	Golden Eagles	Crookston	MN	1,729	Northern Sun Intercollegiate Conference
University of Minnesota Duluth	Bulldogs	Duluth	MN	9,253	Northern Sun Intercollegiate Conference
Minot State University	Beavers	Minot	ND	2,751	Northern Sun Intercollegiate Conference
Mississippi Christian University	Choctaws	Clinton	MS	4,250	Gulf South Conference
Missouri University of Science and Technology	Miners	Rolla	MO	7,154	Great Lakes Valley Conference
Missouri Southern State University	Lions	Joplin	MO	4,147	Mid-America Intercollegiate Athletics Association
Missouri Western State University	Griffons	St. Joseph	MO	3,716	Mid-America Intercollegiate Athletics Association
University of Missouri–St. Louis	Tritons	St. Louis	MO	14,787	Great Lakes Valley Conference
Molloy University	Lions	Rockville Centre	NY	4,845	East Coast Conference
Montana State University Billings	Yellowjackets	Billings	MT	4,129	Great Northwest Athletic Conference
University of Montevallo	Falcons	Montevallo	AL	3,142	Gulf South Conference
Morehouse College (Note: Men's only institution in undergraduate programs, therefore it does not compete in women's sports.)	Maroon Tigers	Atlanta	GA	2,206	Southern Intercollegiate Athletic Conference
University of Mount Olive	Trojans	Mount Olive	NC	2,154	Conference Carolinas
University of Nebraska at Kearney	Lopers	Kearney	NE	5,881	Mid-America Intercollegiate Athletics Association
New Mexico Highlands University	Cowboys & Cowgirls	Las Vegas	NM	2,704	Rocky Mountain Athletic Conference
Newberry College	Wolves	Newberry	SC	1,521	South Atlantic Conference
Newman University	Jets	Wichita	KS	2,787	Mid-America Intercollegiate Athletics Association
University of North Georgia	Nighthawks	Dahlonega	GA	19,298	Peach Belt Conference
North Greenville University	Trailblazers	Tigerville	SC	2,304	Conference Carolinas
Northeastern State University	RiverHawks	Tahlequah	OK	8,002	Mid-America Intercollegiate Athletics Association
Northern Michigan University	Wildcats	Marquette	MI	6,961	Great Lakes Intercollegiate Athletic Conference
Northern State University	Wolves	Aberdeen	SD	3,711	Northern Sun Intercollegiate Conference
Northwest Missouri State University	Bearcats	Maryville	MO	9,152	Mid-America Intercollegiate Athletics Association
Northwest Nazarene University	Nighthawks	Nampa	ID	1,646	Great Northwest Athletic Conference
Northwestern Oklahoma State University	Rangers	Alva	OK	2,081	Great American Conference
Northwood University	Timberwolves	Midland	MI	2,227	Great Midwest Athletic Conference
Nova Southeastern University	Sharks	Davie	FL	22,830	Sunshine State Conference
Ohio Dominican University	Panthers	Columbus	OH	1,209	Great Midwest Athletic Conference
Oklahoma Baptist University	Bison	Shawnee	OK	1,569	Great American Conference
Oklahoma Christian University	Eagles & Lady Eagles	Oklahoma City	OK	2,153	Lone Star Conference
Ouachita Baptist University	Tigers	Arkadelphia	AR	1,858	Great American Conference
Pace University	Setters	Pleasantville	NY	14,092	Northeast-10 Conference
Palm Beach Atlantic University	Sailfish	West Palm Beach	FL	4,147	Sunshine State Conference
University of Wisconsin–Parkside	Rangers	Kenosha	WI	3,947	Great Lakes Intercollegiate Athletic Conference
Pittsburg State University	Gorillas	Pittsburg	KS	5,774	Mid-America Intercollegiate Athletics Association
University of Pittsburgh at Johnstown	Mountain Cats	Johnstown	PA	1,809	Pennsylvania State Athletic Conference
Point Loma Nazarene University	Sea Lions	San Diego	CA	4,813	Pacific West Conference
Point Park University	Pioneers	Pittsburgh	PA	3,448	Mountain East Conference
Post University	Eagles	Waterbury	CT	21,699	Central Atlantic Collegiate Conference
University of Puerto Rico at Bayamón	Cowboys	Bayamón	PR	2,967	Independent
University of Puerto Rico at Mayagüez	Bulldogs	Mayagüez	PR	10,716	Independent
University of Puerto Rico at Río Piedras	Gallitos	San Juan	PR	11,493	Independent
Purdue University Northwest	Lions	Hammond and Westville (Note: Purdue Northwest maintains a branch campus in Westville, where the men's and women's cross country teams are housed and where the men's and women's basketball & women's volleyball teams play a portion of their home contests; the other intercollegiate athletics teams compete on the main campus in Hammond.)	IN	9,051	Great Lakes Intercollegiate Athletic Conference
Queens College	Knights	Flushing	NY	15,965	East Coast Conference
Quincy University	Hawks	Quincy	IL	1,192	Great Lakes Valley Conference
Regis University	Rangers	Denver	CO	4,627	Rocky Mountain Athletic Conference
Roberts Wesleyan University	Redhawks	North Chili (Note: Roberts Wesleyan's campus is located in North Chili, but its mailing address is Rochester.)	NY	1,619	East Coast Conference
Rockhurst University	Hawks	Kansas City	MO	3,496	Great Lakes Valley Conference
Rogers State University	Hillcats	Claremore	OK	3,281	Mid-America Intercollegiate Athletics Association
Rollins College	Tars	Winter Park	FL	3,047	Sunshine State Conference
Roosevelt University	Lakers	Chicago	IL	4,281	Great Lakes Intercollegiate Athletic Conference
Saginaw Valley State University	Cardinals	University Center	MI	6,849	Great Lakes Intercollegiate Athletic Conference
Saint Anselm College (Note: Saint Anselm will transition to NCAA Division III at the end of the 2026–27 athletic season.)	Hawks	Goffstown	NH	2,111	Northeast-10 Conference
St. Cloud State University	Huskies	St. Cloud	MN	10,164	Northern Sun Intercollegiate Conference
St. Edward's University	Hilltoppers	Austin	TX	3,309	Lone Star Conference
Saint Leo University	Lions	St. Leo	FL	14,190	Sunshine State Conference
Saint Martin's University	Saints	Lacey	WA	1,505	Great Northwest Athletic Conference
St. Mary's University	Rattlers	San Antonio	TX	3,457	Lone Star Conference
Saint Michael's College	Purple Knights	Colchester	VT	1,370	Northeast-10 Conference
St. Thomas Aquinas College	Spartans	Sparkill	NY	1,950	East Coast Conference
Salem University (Note: Salem will transition back to the NAIA after the 2026–27 athletic season.)	Tigers	Salem	WV	894	Independent
San Francisco State University	Gators	San Francisco	CA	22,357	California Collegiate Athletic Association
Savannah State University	Tigers	Savannah	GA	3,208	Southern Intercollegiate Athletic Conference
Seattle Pacific University	Falcons	Seattle	WA	2,261	Great Northwest Athletic Conference
Seton Hill University	Griffins	Greensburg	PA	1,989	Pennsylvania State Athletic Conference
Shaw University	Bears	Raleigh	NC	962	Central Intercollegiate Athletic Association
Shepherd University	Rams	Shepherdstown	WV	3,339	Pennsylvania State Athletic Conference
Shippensburg University	Raiders	Shippensburg	PA	5,165	Pennsylvania State Athletic Conference
Shorter University	Hawks	Rome	GA	1,447	Conference Carolinas
Simon Fraser University (Note: Simon Fraser University will rejoin U Sports starting in 2027.)	Red Leafs	Burnaby	BC	30,380	Great Northwest Athletic Conference
University of Sioux Falls	Cougars	Sioux Falls	SD	1,624	Northern Sun Intercollegiate Conference
Slippery Rock University	The Rock	Slippery Rock	PA	8,394	Pennsylvania State Athletic Conference
University of South Carolina Aiken	Pacers	Aiken	SC	3,855	Peach Belt Conference
University of South Carolina Beaufort	Sand Sharks	Bluffton	SC	2,204	Peach Belt Conference
South Dakota School of Mines and Technology	Hardrockers	Rapid City	SD	2,579	Rocky Mountain Athletic Conference
Southeastern Oklahoma State University	Savage Storm	Durant	OK	5,801	Great American Conference
Southern Arkansas University	Muleriders	Magnolia	AR	4,733	Great American Conference
Southern Connecticut State University	Owls	New Haven	CT	9,377	Northeast-10 Conference
Southern Nazarene University	Crimson Storm	Bethany	OK	2,165	Great American Conference
Southern New Hampshire University	Penmen	Manchester and Hooksett (Note: The college's athletic facilities are spread across the campus, which is split between Manchester and Hooksett.)	NH	2,769 (Note: This number accounts only for Southern New Hampshire University's on-campus enrollment. The university's online enrollment totals well over 200,000.)	Northeast-10 Conference
Southern Wesleyan University	Warriors	Central	SC	980	Conference Carolinas
Southwest Baptist University	Bearcats	Bolivar	MO	2,709	Great Lakes Valley Conference
Southwest Minnesota State University	Mustangs	Marshall	MN	7,773	Northern Sun Intercollegiate Conference
Southwestern Oklahoma State University	Bulldogs	Weatherford	OK	5,163	Great American Conference
Spring Hill College	Badgers	Mobile	AL	920	Southern Intercollegiate Athletic Conference (Gulf South Conference in 2027)
College of Staten Island	Dolphins	Staten Island	NY	10,973	East Coast Conference
Sul Ross State University	Lobos	Alpine	TX	2,576	Lone Star Conference
University of Tampa	Spartans	Tampa	FL	11,429	Sunshine State Conference
Texas A&M University–Kingsville	Javelinas	Kingsville	TX	6,862	Lone Star Conference
Texas A&M International University	Dustdevils	Laredo	TX	8,532	Lone Star Conference
Texas Woman's University (Note: Despite the fact the school accepts male students, only women's sports are sponsored by the school.)	Pioneers	Denton	TX	15,361	Lone Star Conference
University of Texas at Dallas	Comets	Richardson	TX	29,886	Lone Star Conference
University of Texas Permian Basin	Falcons	Odessa	TX	7,372	Lone Star Conference
University of Texas at Tyler	Patriots	Tyler	TX	10,183	Lone Star Conference
Thomas More University	Saints	Crestview Hills	KY	1,844	Great Midwest Athletic Conference
Tiffin University	Dragons	Tiffin	OH	3,726	Great Midwest Athletic Conference
Trevecca Nazarene University	Trojans	Nashville	TN	3,196	Gulf South Conference
Truman State University	Bulldogs	Kirksville	MO	3,664	Great Lakes Valley Conference
Tusculum University	Pioneers	Greeneville (Note: The mailing address is Greeneville, but the campus is in unincorporated Greene County in the census-designated place of Tusculum, Tennessee.)	TN	1,105	South Atlantic Conference
Tuskegee University	Golden Tigers	Tuskegee	AL	3,121	Southern Intercollegiate Athletic Conference
University of California, Merced	Bobcats	Merced	CA	9,110	California Collegiate Athletic Association
University of North Carolina at Pembroke	Braves	Pembroke	NC	7,674	Conference Carolinas
Union University	Bulldogs	Jackson	TN	2,718	Gulf South Conference
Upper Iowa University	Peacocks	Fayette	IA	5,559	Great Lakes Valley Conference
Ursuline College (Note: The school does not sponsor men's basketball.)	Arrows	Pepper Pike	OH	970	Great Midwest Athletic Conference
Valdosta State University	Blazers	Valdosta	GA	10,305	Gulf South Conference (Peach Belt Conference in 2027)
Vanguard University	Lions	Costa Mesa	CA	2,219	Pacific West Conference
Virginia State University	Trojans	Ettrick (Note: Virginia State's campus is in Ettrick, but has a Petersburg mailing address.)	VA	5,605	Central Intercollegiate Athletic Association
Virginia Union University	Panthers	Richmond	VA	1,783	Central Intercollegiate Athletic Association
University of Virginia's College at Wise	Cavaliers	Wise	VA	2,253	South Atlantic Conference
Walsh University	Cavaliers	North Canton	OH	2,311	Great Midwest Athletic Conference
Washburn University	Ichabods	Topeka	KS	5,327	Mid-America Intercollegiate Athletics Association
Wayne State University	Warriors	Detroit	MI	24,182	Great Lakes Intercollegiate Athletic Conference
Wayne State College	Wildcats	Wayne	NE	4,666	Northern Sun Intercollegiate Conference
University of West Alabama	Tigers	Livingston	AL	6,195	Gulf South Conference
West Chester University	Golden Rams	West Chester	PA	17,202	Pennsylvania State Athletic Conference
West Liberty University	Hilltoppers	West Liberty	WV	2,291	Mountain East Conference
West Texas A&M University	Buffaloes	Canyon	TX	9,037	Lone Star Conference
West Virginia State University	Yellow Jackets	Institute	WV	3,247	Mountain East Conference
West Virginia Wesleyan College	Bobcats	Buckhannon	WV	1,041	Mountain East Conference
Western Colorado University	Mountaineers	Gunnison	CO	3,548	Rocky Mountain Athletic Conference
Western New Mexico University	Mustangs	Silver City	NM	3,531	Lone Star Conference
Western Oregon University	Wolves	Monmouth	OR	3,823	Great Northwest Athletic Conference
Western Washington University	Vikings	Bellingham	WA	14,700	Great Northwest Athletic Conference
Westminster University	Griffins	Salt Lake City	UT	1,155	Rocky Mountain Athletic Conference
Westmont College	Warriors	Santa Barbara	CA	1,312	Pacific West Conference
Wheeling University	Cardinals	Wheeling	WV	1,171	Mountain East Conference
William Jewell College	Cardinals	Liberty	MO	956	Great Lakes Valley Conference
Wilmington University	Wildcats	New Castle	DE	20,384	Central Atlantic Collegiate Conference
Wingate University	Bulldogs	Wingate	NC	3,424	South Atlantic Conference
Winona State University	Warriors	Winona	MN	6,072	Northern Sun Intercollegiate Conference
Winston-Salem State University	Rams	Winston-Salem	NC	4,192	Central Intercollegiate Athletic Association
Young Harris College	Mountain Lions	Young Harris	GA	1,922	Conference Carolinas

==== Reinstating athletics ====
School	Nickname	City	State/ Province	Enrollment	Conference	Reinstating
Sonoma State University (Note: Sonoma State is still considered a NCAA Division II member despite having suspended its athletic program for two seasons.)	Seawolves	Rohnert Park	CA	6,566	California Collegiate Athletic Association	2027 (Note: Sonoma State will reinstate their athletic program starting in the 2027–28 athletic season.)

=== Reclassifying to Division II ===
The reclassification process from one NCAA division to another requires three to five years, except for moves to Division II. Moves from Division III or another national governing body (such as the NAIA) to Division II typically requires three years, but as of 2024 can be expedited to only need two. Moves from Division I to II require two years.

School	Nickname	City	State/ province	Enrollment	Conference	Reclassifying from	Full membership
Ferrum College	Panthers	Ferrum	VA	780	Conference Carolinas	NCAA D-III	2027
Middle Georgia State University	Knights	Macon and Cochran (Note: Middle Georgia State's main campus is in Macon, where the women's cross-country and volleyball teams and men's and women's tennis teams are housed; the other intercollegiate athletics teams compete on the Cochran campus.)	GA	8,409	Peach Belt Conference	NAIA	2028
Shawnee State University	Bears	Portsmouth	OH	3,641	Mountain East Conference	NAIA	2028
Texas A&M University–Texarkana	Eagles	Texarkana	TX	2,109	Lone Star Conference	NAIA	2029

=== Reclassifying from Division II ===
The following programs are reclassifying away from NCAA Division II, or have announced definitive plans to do so. Under current NCAA rules, they must have an invitation from a conference to begin the transition to Division I. During the normally four-year transition period, they are ineligible for the Division I playoffs. Since January 2025, there is an option to shorten this transition to three years.

School name	Common name	Teams	Location	State	Type	Subdivision	Conference	Reclassified	Full D-I member
Mercyhurst University	Mercyhurst	Lakers	Erie	PA	Private	FCS	Northeast Conference	2024	2027
University of New Haven	New Haven	Chargers	New Haven	CT	Private	FCS	Northeast Conference	2025	2028
University of West Florida	West Florida	Argonauts	Pensacola	FL	Public	FCS	Atlantic Sun Conference	2026	2029
University of West Georgia	West Georgia	Wolves	Carrollton	GA	Public	FCS	United Athletic Conference	2024	2027

=== Pending ===
These schools are actively pursuing Division II membership, but have not yet been approved by the NCAA to transition to Division II. Schools wishing to move within the NCAA to Division II must apply by either October 1, with the NCAA making its decision the following February; or February 1, with the NCAA making its decision that July.

School	Nickname	City	State	Enrollment	Conference	Current affiliation	Applying
Lackawanna College	Falcons	Scranton	PA	1,939	Pennsylvania State Athletic Conference	EPAC (NJCAA)	2027
Loyola University New Orleans	Wolf Pack	New Orleans	LA	4,351	Gulf South Conference	SSAC (NAIA)	2027
Monroe University	Mustangs	New Rochelle	NY	7,924	Central Atlantic Collegiate Conference	Independent (NJCAA)	2027
Texas Wesleyan University	Rams	Fort Worth	TX	2,666	Lone Star Conference	Sooner (NAIA)	2027
Georgia Gwinnett College	Grizzlies	Lawrenceville	GA	11,907	Peach Belt Conference	Continental (NAIA)	TBA

== Sports not in D-II ==
The NCAA does not conduct separate Division II championships in the following sports:

- Men: Gymnastics, ice hockey, volleyball, water polo (note, however, that no Division II member currently sponsors men's gymnastics)
- Women: Bowling, gymnastics, ice hockey, water polo, wrestling. The first official championships in acrobatics & tumbling and stunt will be held in 2026–27, and a separate Division II bowling championship will be established in 2027–28.
- Coeducational: Fencing, rifle, skiing

Some schools have opted to compete in a sport at a higher level and are allowed to do so by the NCAA under certain circumstances. First, when the NCAA placed severe restrictions on the fielding of Division I teams by Division II institutions in 2011, it grandfathered in all then-current D-I teams at D-II schools. Apart from this, Division II members are allowed to compete for Division I championships in sports in which a Division II national championship is not contested.

In some sports, the NCAA only sponsors championships open to all member schools regardless of division, with examples including beach volleyball, fencing, rifle, and water polo. In men's and women's ice hockey and men's volleyball, the NCAA holds Division III championships, but does not hold a separate D-II championship. The NCAA officially classifies all championship events that are open to schools from more than one division as "National Collegiate", except in men's ice hockey, in which the top-level championship is styled as a Division I championship (presumably due to the past existence of a Division II championship in that sport). Division II members are allowed to compete for National Collegiate championships as well as the Division I men's ice hockey championship; in all such sports, they are allowed to operate under the same rules and scholarship restrictions that apply to full Division I members in that sport.

The Northeast-10 Conference (NE-10) sponsors men's ice hockey for its members who choose to remain in D-II, including a postseason tournament.

Several NE-10 members that sponsored women’s ice hockey also competed in the ECAC Women’s East and pursued the ECAC Open title, a women's ice hockey postseason tournament for those teams remaining in D-II but competing as independents during the regular season, but that tournament has been superseded by the New England Women's Hockey Alliance (NEWHA), which began play in 2017 as a scheduling agreement between all of the existing women's National Collegiate independents (including full D-I member Sacred Heart), organized as a full conference in 2018, and received official NCAA recognition in 2019.

Because the NE-10 is the sole Division II hockey league, its postseason champion cannot compete for the NCAA national hockey championship. The Post University men's team competes as D-II as a single-sport NE-10 member, while its women's team is a member of the NEWHA.

- Future conference affiliations indicated in this list will take effect on July 1 of the stated year. In the case of spring sports, the first year of competition will take place in the calendar year after the conference move becomes official.

School	Nickname	Location	Sport	Conference
Adelphi	Panthers	Garden City, NY	Bowling	East Coast Conference
Alaska	Nanooks	Fairbanks, AK	Men's ice hockey	Independent
Alaska	Nanooks	Fairbanks, AK	Rifle	Patriot Rifle Conference
Alaska	Nanooks	Fairbanks, AK	Skiing	Rocky Mountain Intercollegiate Ski Association
Alaska Anchorage	Seawolves	Anchorage, AK	Men's ice hockey	Independent
Alaska Anchorage	Seawolves	Anchorage, AK	Skiing	Rocky Mountain Intercollegiate Ski Association
American International	Yellow Jackets	Springfield, MA	Men's volleyball	East Coast Conference
Assumption	Greyhounds	Worcester, MA	Men's ice hockey	Northeast-10 Conference
Assumption	Greyhounds	Worcester, MA	Women's ice hockey	New England Women's Hockey Alliance
Augusta	Jaguars	Augusta, GA	Men's golf	West Coast Conference
Augusta	Jaguars	Augusta, GA	Women's golf	West Coast Conference
Augustana (SD)	Vikings	Sioux Falls, SD	Men's ice hockey	Central Collegiate Hockey Association
Barry	Buccaneers	Miami Shores, FL	Beach volleyball	Sunshine State Conference
Barry	Buccaneers	Miami Shores, FL	Men's volleyball	Independent
Barton	Bulldogs	Wilson, NC	Men's volleyball	Conference Carolinas
Belmont Abbey	Crusaders	Belmont, NC	Bowling	Conference Carolinas
Belmont Abbey	Crusaders	Belmont, NC	Men's volleyball	Conference Carolinas
Bemidji State	Beavers	Bemidji, MN	Men's ice hockey	Central Collegiate Hockey Association
Bemidji State	Beavers	Bemidji, MN	Women's ice hockey	Western Collegiate Hockey Association
Benedict	Tigers	Columbia, SC	Men's volleyball	Southern Intercollegiate Athletic Conference
Bentley	Falcons	Waltham, MA	Men's ice hockey	Atlantic Hockey America
Biola	Eagles	La Mirada, CA	Men's water polo	Western Water Polo Association
Biola	Eagles	La Mirada, CA	Women's water polo	Western Water Polo Association
Bloomsburg	Huskies	Bloomsburg, PA	Wrestling	Mid-American Conference
Bowie State	Bulldogs	Bowie, MD	Bowling	Central Intercollegiate Athletic Association
Bridgeport	Purple Knights	Bridgeport, CT	Women's gymnastics	Eastern College Athletic Conference
Caldwell	Cougars	Caldwell, NJ	Bowling	Central Atlantic Collegiate Conference
Cal State East Bay	Pioneers	Hayward, CA	Women's water polo	Western Water Polo Association
Cal State Los Angeles	Golden Eagles	Los Angeles, CA	Beach volleyball	Independent
Cal State Monterey Bay	Otters	Seaside, CA	Women's water polo	Western Water Polo Association
Carson–Newman	Eagles	Jefferson City, TN	Beach volleyball	South Atlantic Conference
Catawba	Indians	Salisbury, NC	Beach volleyball	South Atlantic Conference
Catawba	Indians	Salisbury, NC	Men's volleyball	Independent
Central Missouri	Jennies	Warrensburg, MO	Bowling	Great Lakes Valley Conference
Central State	Marauders	Wilberforce, OH	Men's volleyball	Southern Intercollegiate Athletic Conference
Chaminade	Silverswords	Honolulu, HI	Beach volleyball	Independent
Charleston (WV)	Golden Eagles	Charleston, WV	Men's volleyball	Eastern Intercollegiate Volleyball Association
Chestnut Hill	Griffins	Philadelphia, PA	Bowling	Central Atlantic Collegiate Conference
Chowan	Hawks	Murfreesboro, NC	Bowling	Conference Carolinas
Clarion	Golden Eagles	Clarion, PA	Wrestling	Mid-American Conference
Coker	Cobras	Hartsville, SC	Men's volleyball	Independent
Colorado Mesa	Mavericks	Grand Junction, CO	Beach volleyball	Independent
Concordia–Irvine	Eagles	Irvine, CA	Beach volleyball	Independent
Concordia–Irvine	Eagles	Irvine, CA	Men's volleyball	Mountain Pacific Sports Federation
Concordia–Irvine	Eagles	Irvine, CA	Men's water polo	Western Water Polo Association
Concordia–Irvine	Eagles	Irvine, CA	Women's water polo	Western Water Polo Association
Daemen	Wildcats	Amherst, NY	Bowling	East Coast Conference
Daemen	Wildcats	Amherst, NY	Men's volleyball	Northeast Conference
Dallas Baptist	Patriots	Dallas, TX	Baseball	Conference USA
Dominican (NY)	Chargers	Orangeburg, NY	Men's volleyball	East Coast Conference
Drury	Panthers	Springfield, MO	Bowling	Great Lakes Valley Conference
D'Youville	Saints	Buffalo, NY	Men's volleyball	Northeast Conference
Eckerd	Tritons	St. Petersburg, FL	Beach volleyball	Sunshine State Conference
Edinboro	Fighting Scots	Edinboro, PA	Wrestling	Mid-American Conference
Edward Waters	Tigers	Jacksonville, FL	Men's volleyball	Southern Intercollegiate Athletic Conference
Elizabeth City State	Vikings	Elizabeth City, NC	Bowling	Central Intercollegiate Athletic Association
Emmanuel (GA)	Lions	Franklin Springs, GA	Beach volleyball	South Atlantic Conference
Emmanuel (GA)	Lions	Franklin Springs, GA	Bowling	Conference Carolinas
Emmanuel (GA)	Lions	Franklin Springs, GA	Men's volleyball	Conference Carolinas
Erskine	Flying Fleet	Due West, SC	Beach volleyball	South Atlantic Conference
Erskine	Flying Fleet	Due West, SC	Men's volleyball	Conference Carolinas
Fayetteville State	Broncos	Fayetteville, NC	Bowling	Central Intercollegiate Athletic Association
Felician	Golden Falcons	Rutherford, NJ	Bowling	Central Atlantic Collegiate Conference
Ferris State	Bulldogs	Big Rapids, MI	Men's ice hockey	Central Collegiate Hockey Association
Florida Southern	Moccasins	Lakeland, FL	Beach volleyball	Sunshine State Conference
Fort Valley State	Wildcats	Fort Valley, GA	Men's volleyball	Southern Intercollegiate Athletic Conference
Francis Marion	Patriots	Florence, SC	Men's golf	Big Sky Conference
Franklin Pierce	Ravens	Rindge, NH	Bowling	East Coast Conference
Franklin Pierce	Ravens	Rindge, NH	Men's ice hockey	Northeast-10 Conference
Franklin Pierce	Ravens	Rindge, NH	Women's ice hockey	New England Women's Hockey Alliance
Fresno Pacific	Sunbirds	Fresno, CA	Beach volleyball (2028)	Independent
Fresno Pacific	Sunbirds	Fresno, CA	Men's water polo	Western Water Polo Association
Fresno Pacific	Sunbirds	Fresno, CA	Women's water polo	Western Water Polo Association
Gannon	Golden Knights	Erie, PA	Men's water polo	Western Water Polo Association
Gannon	Golden Knights	Erie, PA	Women's water polo	Western Water Polo Association
Hawaii Pacific	Sharks	Honolulu, HI	Beach volleyball	Independent
Holy Family	Tigers	Philadelphia, PA	Bowling	Central Atlantic Collegiate Conference
Jamestown	Jimmies	Jamestown, ND	Men's volleyball	Great Lakes Valley Conference
Jessup	Warriors	Rocklin, CA	Men's volleyball	Mountain Pacific Sports Federation
Johnson C. Smith	Golden Bulls	Charlotte, NC	Bowling	Central Intercollegiate Athletic Association
Kentucky State	Thorobreds	Frankfort, KY	Men's volleyball	Southern Intercollegiate Athletic Conference
Kentucky Wesleyan	Panthers	Owensboro, KY	Bowling	Great Midwest Athletic Conference
King	Tornado	Bristol, TN	Men's volleyball	Conference Carolinas
Kutztown	Golden Bears	Kutztown, PA	Bowling	East Coast Conference
Lake Superior State	Lakers	Sault Ste. Marie, MI	Men's ice hockey	Central Collegiate Hockey Association
Lees–McRae	Bobcats	Banner Elk, NC	Men's volleyball	Conference Carolinas
LeMoyne–Owen	Magicians	Memphis, TN	Men's volleyball	Southern Intercollegiate Athletic Conference
Lewis	Flyers	Romeoville, IL	Bowling	Great Lakes Valley Conference
Lewis	Flyers	Romeoville, IL	Men's volleyball	Midwestern Intercollegiate Volleyball Association
Lincoln Memorial	Railsplitters	Harrogate, TN	Bowling	Conference Carolinas
Lincoln Memorial	Railsplitters	Harrogate, TN	Men's volleyball	Independent
Livingstone	Blue Bears	Salisbury, NC	Bowling	Central Intercollegiate Athletic Association
Lock Haven	Bald Eagles	Lock Haven, PA	Field hockey	Atlantic 10 Conference
Lock Haven	Bald Eagles	Lock Haven, PA	Wrestling	Mid-American Conference
Loyola New Orleans	Wolf Pack	New Orleans, LA	Beach volleyball (2028)	Independent
Maryville	Saints	Town and Country, MO	Bowling	Great Lakes Valley Conference
Maryville	Saints	Town and Country, MO	Men's volleyball	Great Lakes Valley Conference
McKendree	Bearcats	Lebanon, IL	Beach volleyball	Independent
McKendree	Bearcats	Lebanon, IL	Bowling	Great Lakes Valley Conference
McKendree	Bearcats	Lebanon, IL	Men's volleyball	Midwestern Intercollegiate Volleyball Association
McKendree	Bearcats	Lebanon, IL	Men's water polo	Western Water Polo Association
McKendree	Bearcats	Lebanon, IL	Women's water polo	Western Water Polo Association
Menlo	Oaks	Atherton, CA	Men's volleyball	Mountain Pacific Sports Federation
Michigan Tech	Huskies	Houghton, MI	Men's ice hockey	Central Collegiate Hockey Association
Michigan Tech	Huskies	Houghton, MI	Skiing	Central Collegiate Ski Association
Minnesota State	Mavericks	Mankato, MN	Men's ice hockey	Central Collegiate Hockey Association
Minnesota State	Mavericks	Mankato, MN	Women's ice hockey	Western Collegiate Hockey Association
Minnesota Duluth	Bulldogs	Duluth, MN	Men's ice hockey	National Collegiate Hockey Conference
Minnesota Duluth	Bulldogs	Duluth, MN	Women's ice hockey	Western Collegiate Hockey Association
Missouri S&T	Miners	Rolla, MO	Men's volleyball	Great Lakes Valley Conference
Molloy	Lions	Rockville Centre, NY	Bowling	East Coast Conference
Monroe	Mustangs	New Rochelle, NY	Men's volleyball (2028)	Likely East Coast Conference
Morehouse	Maroon Tigers	Atlanta, GA	Men's volleyball	Southern Intercollegiate Athletic Conference
Mount Olive	Trojans	Mount Olive, NC	Men's volleyball	Conference Carolinas
North Georgia	Nighthawks	Dahlonega, GA	Rifle	Southern Conference
North Greenville	Crusaders	Tigerville, SC	Men's volleyball	Conference Carolinas
Northern Michigan	Wildcats	Marquette, MI	Men's ice hockey	Central Collegiate Hockey Association
Northern Michigan	Wildcats	Marquette, MI	Skiing	Central Collegiate Ski Association
Oklahoma Christian	Eagles and Lady Eagles	Oklahoma City, OK	Bowling	Great Lakes Valley Conference
Palm Beach Atlantic	Sailfish	West Palm Beach, FL	Beach volleyball	Sunshine State Conference
Post	Eagles	Waterbury, CT	Women's ice hockey	New England Women's Hockey Alliance
Puerto Rico–Bayamón	Cowboys	Bayamón, PR	Men's volleyball	Independent
Puerto Rico–Mayagüez	Colegio	Mayagüez, PR	Men's volleyball	Independent
Puerto Rico–Río Piedras	Colegio	Gallitos & Jerezanas, PR	Men's volleyball	Independent
Quincy	Hawks	Quincy, IL	Bowling	Great Lakes Valley Conference
Quincy	Hawks	Quincy, IL	Men's volleyball	Great Lakes Valley Conference
Roberts Wesleyan	Redhawks	North Chili, NY	Bowling	East Coast Conference
Roberts Wesleyan	Redhawks	North Chili, NY	Men's volleyball	East Coast Conference
Rockhurst	Hawks	Kansas City, MO	Men's volleyball	Great Lakes Valley Conference
Roosevelt	Lakers	Chicago, IL	Men's volleyball	Great Lakes Valley Conference
Saint Anselm	Hawks	Goffstown, NH	Men's ice hockey	Northeast-10 Conference
Saint Anselm	Hawks	Goffstown, NH	Women's ice hockey	New England Women's Hockey Alliance
Saint Anselm	Hawks	Goffstown, NH	Bowling	East Coast Conference
Saint Augustine's	Falcons	Raleigh, NC	Bowling	Central Intercollegiate Athletic Association
St. Cloud State	Huskies	St. Cloud, MN	Men's ice hockey	National Collegiate Hockey Conference
St. Cloud State	Huskies	St. Cloud, MN	Women's ice hockey	Western Collegiate Hockey Association
St. Cloud State	Huskies	St. Cloud, MN	Skiing (Women's only)	Central Collegiate Ski Association
Saint Leo	Lions	St. Leo, FL	Beach volleyball	Sunshine State Conference
Saint Michael's	Purple Knights	Colchester, VT	Men's ice hockey	Northeast-10 Conference
Saint Michael's	Purple Knights	Colchester, VT	Women's ice hockey	New England Women's Hockey Alliance
Saint Michael's	Purple Knights	Colchester, VT	Skiing	Eastern Intercollegiate Ski Association
St. Thomas Aquinas	Spartans	Sparkill, NY	Bowling	East Coast Conference
St. Thomas Aquinas	Spartans	Sparkill, NY	Men's volleyball	East Coast Conference
Salem	Tigers	Salem, WV	Men's water polo	Western Water Polo Association
Salem	Tigers	Salem, WV	Women's water polo	Western Water Polo Association
Shaw	Bears	Raleigh, NC	Bowling	Central Intercollegiate Athletic Association
Shawnee State	Bears	Portsmouth, OH	Bowling	TBA
Southern Connecticut	Fighting Owls	New Haven, CT	Women's gymnastics	Eastern College Athletic Conference
Southern New Hampshire	Penmen	Manchester, NH	Men's ice hockey	Northeast-10 Conference
Southwest Baptist	Bearcats	Bolivar, MO	Beach volleyball	Independent
Southwest Baptist	Bearcats	Bolivar, MO	Men's volleyball	Great Lakes Valley Conference
Spring Hill	Badgers	Mobile, AL	Beach volleyball	Independent
Tampa	Spartans	Tampa, FL	Beach volleyball	Sunshine State Conference
Texas A&M–Kingsville	Javelinas	Kingsville, TX	Beach volleyball	Independent
Texas A&M–Texarkana	Eagles	Texarkana, TX	Beach volleyball (2028)	Independent
Texas A&M–Texarkana	Eagles	Texarkana, TX	Bowling (2027)	TBA
Texas Wesleyan	Rams	Fort Worth, TX	Beach volleyball (2029)	Independent
Texas Woman's	Pioneers	Denton, TX	Women's gymnastics	Midwest Independent Conference
Thomas More	Saints	Crestview Hills, KY	Men's volleyball	Great Lakes Valley Conference
Tusculum	Pioneers	Tusculum, TN	Beach volleyball	South Atlantic Conference
Tusculum	Pioneers	Tusculum, TN	Bowling	Conference Carolinas
Tusculum	Pioneers	Tusculum, TN	Men's volleyball	Independent
UC Merced	Golden Bobcats	Merced, CA	Men's volleyball	Mountain Pacific Sports Federation
Upper Iowa	Peacocks	Fayette, IA	Bowling	Great Lakes Valley Conference
Ursuline	Arrows	Pepper Pike, OH	Bowling	Great Midwest Athletic Conference
Vanguard	Lions	Costa Mesa, CA	Beach volleyball	Independent
Vanguard	Lions	Costa Mesa, CA	Men's volleyball	Mountain Pacific Sports Federation
Virginia State	Trojans	Ettrick, VA	Bowling	Central Intercollegiate Athletic Association
Virginia Union	Panthers	Richmond, VA	Bowling	Central Intercollegiate Athletic Association
Walsh	Cavaliers	North Canton, OH	Bowling	Great Midwest Athletic Conference
Wayne State (MI)	Warriors	Detroit, MI	Fencing	Midwest Fencing Conference
Wayne State (NE)	Wildcats	Wayne, NE	Beach volleyball	Independent
West Chester	Golden Rams	West Chester, PA	Women's gymnastics	Eastern College Athletic Conference
Westminster (UT)	Griffins	Salt Lake City, UT	Skiing	Rocky Mountain Intercollegiate Ski Association
Wilmington	Wildcats	New Castle, DE	Bowling	Central Atlantic Collegiate Conference
Wingate University	Bulldogs	Wingate, NC	Beach volleyball	South Atlantic Conference
Winona State	Warriors	Winona, MN	Women's gymnastics	Wisconsin Intercollegiate Athletic Conference

== Probation ==
The following is a list of Division II institutions currently on probation by the NCAA in one or more sports. Probation decisions are made by the National Collegiate Athletic Association's Committee on Infractions.

Institution	Sport(s)	Expiration date
West Chester University	Men's basketball	December 17, 2026
University of Nebraska-Kearney	Football	January 28, 2027
Shepherd University	Entire athletic program	May 13, 2027
West Texas A&M University	Men's and women's track & field, men's and women's cross country	May 21, 2027
Westminster University (Utah)	Men's and women's track & field	June 25, 2027
Fort Lewis College	Eleven sports (Note: Sports specifically mentioned in the NCAA infractions decision were football, men's and women's cross country, men's golf, men's and women's soccer, men's and women's indoor/outdoor track & field, and women's lacrosse.)	July 8, 2027
King University	Men's and women's volleyball	October 10, 2027
Quincy University	17 of 24 sports (Note: Sports specifically mentioned in the NCAA infractions decision were women's basketball, men's lacrosse, and men's and women's soccer.)	December 17, 2027

== See also ==
- List of NCAA Division II football programs
- List of NCAA Division II baseball programs
- List of NCAA Division II softball programs
- List of NCAA Division II lacrosse programs
- List of NCAA Division II men's soccer programs
- List of NCAA Division II women's soccer programs
- List of NCAA Division II men's wrestling programs
- List of NCAA Division II men's basketball programs
- List of NCAA Division I institutions
- List of NCAA Division III institutions
- List of NAIA institutions
- List of USCAA institutions
- List of NCCAA institutions
- List of NCAA Divisions II and III schools competing in NCAA Division I sports
