= East Coast Conference =

Current NCAA Division II athletic conference

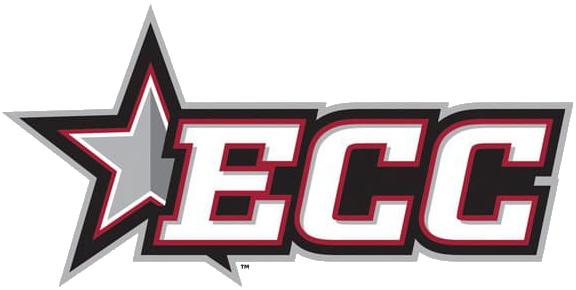
- Formerly: New York Collegiate Athletic Conference (1989–2006)
- Association: NCAA
- Founded: 1989; 37 years ago
- Commissioner: Jessica Grasso (since 2024)
- Sports fielded: 18; men's: 8; women's: 10
- Division: Division II
- No. of teams: 9
- Headquarters: Colonia, New Jersey
- Region: Northeastern United States
- Website: eccsports.org

Locations
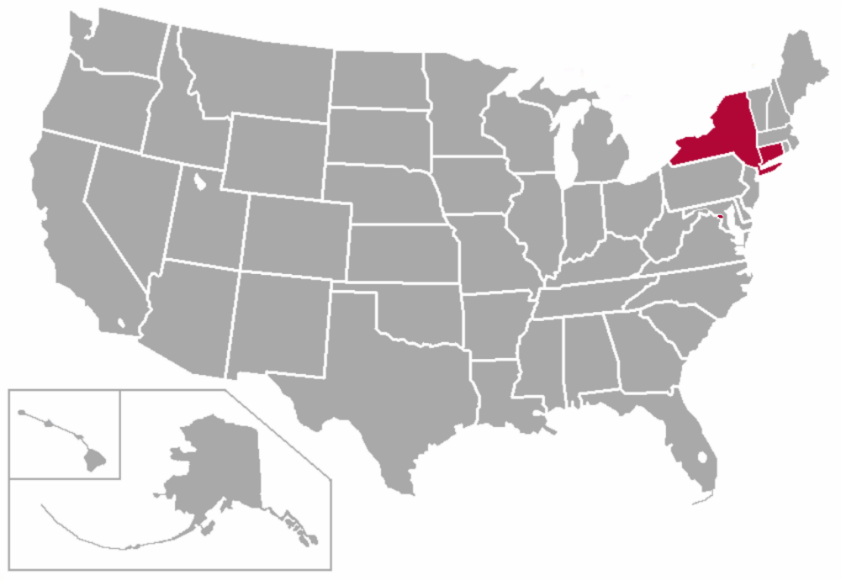

The East Coast Conference (ECC) is a college athletic conference affiliated with the National Collegiate Athletic Association (NCAA) at the Division II level. Member institutions are located primarily in the state of New York, with a single member located in the District of Columbia.

== History ==
East Coast Conference
Location of ECC members: full

The East Coast Conference was founded in 1989 as the New York Collegiate Athletic Conference (NYCAC). Its charter members included Adelphi University (1989–2009), Concordia College (1989–2009), C. W. Post College (1989–2019), Dowling College (1989–2016), Mercy College (1989–present), Molloy College (1989–present), New York Institute of Technology (NYIT) (1989–2020), Pace University (1989–1997), Queens College (1989–present) and Southampton College of Long Island University (1989–2005).

Other members that joined were: University of Bridgeport (2000–2022), University of New Haven (2002–2008), New Jersey Institute of Technology (NJIT) (1997–2000), Philadelphia University (1991–2005), College of Saint Rose (1991–2000), St. Thomas Aquinas College (2000–present), University of the District of Columbia (2011–present), Roberts Wesleyan College (2012–present), Daemen University (2013–present), D'Youville University (2020–present) and College of Staten Island (2020–present).

The ECC has become a lacrosse powerhouse, seeing six ECC teams win the Division II Men's Lacrosse championship over the past 10 years. In addition, at least 1 ECC team has competed in 13 the last 14 championship games. Recent ECC champions include Adelphi (1998, 1999, 2001), C.W. Post (1996, 2006 Tri-Champion), Dowling College (2006 Tri-Champion), NYIT (1997, 2003, 2005, 2008), and Mercyhurst College (2006 Tri-Champion, 2007)

Two changes to the conference membership were announced in the fall of 2018. First, it was announced on October 3, 2018 that Long Island University would unite its two athletic programs—the Division II LIU Post program and Division I program at LIU Brooklyn—into a single Division I program under the overall university name effective in 2019–20. Second, it was announced on December 7, 2018 that beginning with the 2020 season (2019–20 school year), Frostburg State University will join the conference as an associate member in men's lacrosse, contingent on being accepted into Division II by the NCAA.

The next change in conference membership was announced in March 2019, when the College of Staten Island (CSI), preparing to begin a transition from NCAA Division III, was accepted as a member effective with the 2020–21 school year. The following August, Tusculum University was announced as a bowling affiliate, effective in 2019–20. In March 2020, then-current Division III member D'Youville College ("University" since 2022) was announced as a future member effective in 2020–21, contingent on NCAA approval of that school's transition to D-II; the NCAA's acceptance was officially announced on July 10, 2020.

In December 2021, the University of Bridgeport published its acceptance into the Central Atlantic Collegiate Conference as its new member for the 2022–23 school year.

=== Chronological timeline ===
- 1989 – The East Coast Conference (ECC) was founded as the New York Collegiate Athletic Conference (NYCAC). Its charter members included Adelphi University, Concordia College of New York, Dowling College, the C.W. Post Campus of Long Island University (LIU Post), Mercy College, Molloy College, the New York Institute of Technology (New York Tech or NYIT), Pace University, Queens College and Southampton College of Long Island University (LIU Southampton), beginning the 1989–90 academic year.
- 1991 – The Philadelphia College of Textiles & Science (later Philadelphia University, now Thomas Jefferson University) and the College of Saint Rose joined the NYCAC in the 1991–92 academic year.
- 1997 – Pace left the NYCAC to join the Northeast-10 Conference (NE-10) after the 1996–97 academic year.
- 1997 – The New Jersey Institute of Technology (New Jersey Tech or NJIT) joined the NYCAC in the 1997–98 academic year.
- 2000 – Two institutions left the NYCAC to join their respective new home primary conferences, both effective after the 1999–2000 academic year:
  - New Jersey Tech (NJIT) to join the Central Atlantic Collegiate Conference (CACC)
  - and Saint Rose to join the NE-10
- 2000 – The University of Bridgeport and St. Thomas Aquinas College joined the NYCAC in the 2000–01 academic year.
- 2002 – The University of New Haven joined the NYCAC in the 2002–03 academic year.
- 2005 – Two institutions left the NYCAC to join their respective new home primary conferences, both effective after the 2004–05 academic year:
  - Philadelphia (now Jefferson) to join the CACC
  - and LIU Southampton to discontinue its athletic program and close the school
- 2005 – Mercyhurst University joined the NYCAC as an affiliate member for men's lacrosse in the 2006 spring season (2005–06 academic year).
- 2006 – The NYCAC was rebranded as the East Coast Conference (ECC) in the 2006–07 academic year.
- 2006 – Dominican College of New York, known since 2022 as Dominican University New York, joined the ECC as an affiliate member for men's lacrosse in the 2007 spring season (2006–07 academic year).
- 2008 – New Haven left the ECC to join the NE-10 after the 2007-08 academic year.
- 2009 – Two institutions left the ECC to join their respective new home primary conferences, both effective after the 2008–09 academic year:
  - Adelphi to join the NE-10
  - and Concordia (N.Y.) to join the CACC
- 2009 – Four institutions joined the ECC as affiliate members, all effective in the 2010 spring season (2009–10 academic year):
  - Chestnut Hill College and Wheeling Jesuit University for only men's lacrosse
  - Lake Erie College and Seton Hill University for men's and women's lacrosse
- 2011 – The University of the District of Columbia joined the ECC in the 2011–12 academic year.
- 2012 – Three institutions left the ECC as affiliate members, all effective after the 2012 spring season (2011–12 academic year):
  - Lake Erie and Seton Hill for men's and women's lacrosse
  - and Mercyhurst and Wheeling Jesuit for only men's lacrosse
- 2012 – Roberts Wesleyan College joined the ECC in the 2012–13 academic year.
- 2012 – Georgian Court University joined the ECC as an affiliate member for women's indoor and outdoor track & field in the 2012–13 academic year.
- 2013 – Georgian Court left the ECC as an affiliate member for women's outdoor track & field after the 2013–14 academic year.
- 2013 – Daemen College (now Daeman University) joined the ECC in the 2013–14 academic year.
- 2013 – Georgian Court added men's indoor track & field into its ECC affiliate membership in the 2013–14 academic year.
- 2015 – Felician University, Franklin Pierce University and Kutztown University of Pennsylvania joined the ECC as affiliate members for women's bowling (with Adelphi rejoining for that sport), all effective in the 2016 spring season (2015–16 academic year).
- 2016
  - Dowling left the ECC to announce that the school would cease operations after the 2015–16 academic year.
  - Three institutions joined the ECC as affiliate members, all effective in the 2017 spring season (2016–17 academic year):
    - Holy Family University for men's and women's indoor track & field
    - and Lincoln Memorial University and Salem University for women's bowling
- 2017
  - Three institutions left the ECC as affiliate members, all effective after the 2017 spring season (2016–17 academic year):
    - Chestnut Hill and Dominican (N.Y.) for men's lacrosse
    - and Salem for women's bowling
  - Wilmington University of Delaware joined the ECC as an affiliate member for women's bowling (with Chestnut Hill rejoining for that sport), both effective in the 2018 spring season (2017–18 academic year).
- 2018
  - Franklin Pierce left the ECC as an affiliate member for women's bowling after the 2018 spring season (2017–18 academic year).
  - Three institutions joined the ECC as affiliate members, all effective in the 2019 spring season (2018–19 academic year):
    - Bloomfield College and Caldwell University for women's bowling
    - and Post University for men's & women's indoor track & field
- 2019
  - Long Island University, the parent of LIU Post, announced that it would merge the Post athletic program with the D-I athletic program of its Brooklyn campus after the 2018–19 academic year, creating a D-I program that now competes as the LIU Sharks.
  - Three institutions joined the ECC as affiliate members, all effective in the 2020 spring season (2019–20 academic year):
    - Frostburg State University for men's lacrosse
    - Lincoln University of Pennsylvania for baseball and women's soccer
    - and Tusculum University for women's bowling
- 2020
  - New York Tech (NYIT) left the ECC to announce that the school would suspend its athletic programs until further notice (at least two years) after the 2019–20 academic year.
  - D'Youville College (now D'Youville University) and the College of Staten Island joined the ECC in the 2020–21 academic year.
- 2021 – Lincoln Memorial and Tusculum left the ECC as affiliate members for women's bowling after the 2021 spring season (2020–21 academic year).
- 2022
  - Bridgeport left the ECC to join the CACC after the 2021–22 academic year.
  - Division I member Bryant University and Saint Anselm College joined as affiliate members for women's bowling in the 2023 spring season (2022–23 academic year).
  - Bloomfield, Caldwell, Chestnut Hill, Felician and Wilmington (Del.) left the ECC as affiliate members for women's bowling after the 2022 spring season (2021–22 academic year); as their primary conference home (the CACC) launched a bowling league, beginning spring 2023 (2022–23 school year).
- 2023 – The ECC announced it would sponsor men's volleyball in the 2024 spring season (2023–24 school year) with four schools, three of which started men's volleyball programs in that season. Full members Roberts Wesleyan and St. Thomas Aquinas were joined by associates American International College and Dominican (N.Y.). Alliance University was originally announced as a fifth sponsoring member, but the university announced it would permanently close on July 1 before they had played a single game. Of these schools, only American International played men's volleyball in the 2023 season.
- 2024
  - Lincoln (Pa.) left the ECC as an affiliate member in baseball and women's soccer after the 2023–24 academic year.
  - Mercyhurst left the ECC as an affiliate member for women's bowling after the 2024 spring season (2023–24 academic year).
- 2026 – The ECC began sponsoring field hockey in the 2026 fall season (2026–27 school year). Full members D'Youville, Mercy, Molloy, Roberts Wesleyan, and St. Thomas Aquinas were joined by associate Dominican (N.Y.).
- 2027 – Saint Anselm will leave the ECC as an affiliate member for women's bowling after the 2027 spring season (2026–27 academic year).

== Member schools ==
Former East Coast Conference logo from 2006 to 2024

=== Current members ===
The ECC currently has nine full members, all but three are private schools.

Institution	Location	Founded	Affiliation	Enrollment	Nickname	Joined (Note: Represents the calendar year when fall sports competition begins.)	Colors
Daemen University	Amherst, New York	1947	Nonsectarian	2,540	Wildcats	2013 (Note: Daemon previously competed in the ECC as an affiliate member for a majority of sports during the 2012–13 school year)	
University of the District of Columbia	Washington, D.C.	1851	Public (HBCU)	4,202	Firebirds	2011	
D'Youville University	Buffalo, New York	1946	Catholic	2,376	Saints	2020	
Mercy University	Dobbs Ferry, New York	1950	Nonsectarian	8,774	Mavericks	1989	
Molloy University	Rockville Centre, New York	1955	Catholic	4,845	Lions	1989	
Queens College	Queens, New York	1937	Public	15,965	Knights	1989	
Roberts Wesleyan University	Rochester, New York (Note: The Roberts Wesleyan campus has a Rochester mailing address, but is physically located in North Chili, New York.)	1866	Free Methodist	1,619	Redhawks	2012	
St. Thomas Aquinas College	Sparkill, New York	1952	Catholic	1,950	Spartans	2000	
College of Staten Island	Staten Island, New York	1956	Public	10,973	Dolphins	2020	

=== Affiliate members ===
The ECC currently has 9 affiliate members, most of which are private schools.

Institution	Location	Founded	Affiliation	Enrollment	Nickname	Joined (Note: Represents the calendar year when fall sports competition begins.)	Colors	ECC sport(s)	Primary conference
Adelphi University	Garden City, New York	1896	Nonsectarian	7,603	Panthers	2015 (Note: Adelphi was a full member of the ECC from 1989–90 to 2008–09.)		women's bowling	Northeast-10 (NE-10)
American International College	Springfield, Massachusetts	1885	Nonsectarian	2,010	Yellow Jackets	2023		men's volleyball	Northeast-10 (NE-10)
Dominican University New York	Orangeburg, New York	1952	Catholic	1,083	Chargers	2023 (Note: Dominican (N.Y.) previously competed in the ECC as an affiliate member for men's lacrosse from 2006–07 to 2016–17.)		men's volleyball	Central Atlantic (CACC)
Dominican University New York	Orangeburg, New York	1952	Catholic	1,083	Chargers	2026		field hockey	Central Atlantic (CACC)
Felician University	Rutherford, New Jersey	1923	Catholic (C.S.S.F.)	2,427	Golden Falcons	2023 (Note: Felician previously competed in the ECC as an affiliate member for women's bowling from 2015–16 to 2021–22.)		men's indoor track & field	Central Atlantic (CACC)
Felician University	Rutherford, New Jersey	1923	Catholic (C.S.S.F.)	2,427	Golden Falcons	2023		women's indoor track & field	Central Atlantic (CACC)
Frostburg State University	Frostburg, Maryland	1898	Public (USM)	3,422	Bobcats	2019		men's lacrosse	Mountain East (MEC)
Georgian Court University	Lakewood, New Jersey	1908	Catholic	1,910	Lions	2013		men's indoor track & field	Central Atlantic (CACC)
Georgian Court University	Lakewood, New Jersey	1908	Catholic	1,910	Lions	2012		women's indoor track & field (Note: Georgian Court also previously competed in the ECC as an affiliate member for women's outdoor track & field during the 2012–13 school year.)	Central Atlantic (CACC)
Holy Family University	Philadelphia, Pennsylvania	1954	Catholic	3,278	Tigers	2016		men's indoor track & field	Central Atlantic (CACC)
Holy Family University	Philadelphia, Pennsylvania	1954	Catholic	3,278	Tigers	2016		women's indoor track & field	Central Atlantic (CACC)
Kutztown University of Pennsylvania	Kutztown, Pennsylvania	1866	Public (PASSHE)	7,468	Golden Bears	2015		women's bowling	Pennsylvania (PSAC)
Saint Anselm College	Goffstown, New Hampshire	1889	Catholic	2,111	Hawks	2022		women's bowling	Northeast-10 (NE-10)

=== Former members ===
The ECC had ten former full members, all but one were private schools:

Institution	Location	Founded	Affiliation	Enrollment	Nickname	Joined (Note: Represents the calendar year when fall sports competition begins.)	Left (Note: Represents the calendar year when spring sports competition ends.)	Current conference
Adelphi University (Note: Adelphi remains in the ECC as an affiliate member for bowling.)	Garden City, New York	1896	Nonsectarian	8,110	Panthers	1989	2009	Northeast-10 (NE-10)
University of Bridgeport	Bridgeport, Connecticut	1927	Nonsectarian	5,543	Purple Knights	2000	2022	Central Atlantic (CACC)
Concordia College	Bronxville, New York	1881	Lutheran LCMS	N/A	Clippers	1989	2009	Closed in 2021 (Note: Concordia (N.Y.)'s campus was later sold to nearby Iona College, now Iona University.)
Dowling College	Oakdale, New York	1963	Nonsectarian	N/A	Golden Lions	1989	2016	Closed in 2016
Long Island University–Post (LIU Post)	Brookville, New York	1954	Nonsectarian	8,472	Pioneers	1989	2019	Northeast (NEC) (Note: Currently an NCAA Division I athletic conference.) (Note: Long Island University merged the Post athletic program with the NCAA Division I program of its Brooklyn campus in 2019. The merged program inherited the Division I membership of the Brooklyn campus, and now competes in the Northeast Conference as the LIU Sharks.)
University of New Haven	West Haven, Connecticut	1920	Nonsectarian	6,400	Chargers	2002	2008	Northeast (NEC)
New Jersey Institute of Technology (NJIT)	Newark, New Jersey	1881	Public	11,652	Highlanders	1997	2000	America East (AmEast)
New York Institute of Technology (NYIT)	Old Westbury, New York	1955	Nonsectarian	9,930	Bears	1989	2020	N/A (Note: As of July 1, 2022, New York Tech (NYIT) suspended its athletic program after the 2019–20 school year.)
Pace University	Manhattan, New York	1906	Nonsectarian	12,772	Setters	1989	1997	Northeast-10 (NE-10)
Philadelphia University (Note: Merged with Thomas Jefferson University, a healthcare-only institution with no athletic program, in 2017. The PhilaU athletic program, now branded as "Jefferson", moved in its entirety to the merged institution.)	Philadelphia, Pennsylvania	1884	Nonsectarian	3,540	Rams	1991	2005	Central Atlantic (CACC)
College of Saint Rose	Albany, New York	1920	Catholic	4,863	Golden Knights	1991	2000	Closed in 2024
Southampton College of Long Island University (LIU Southampton)	Southampton, New York	1963	Nonsectarian	N/A	Colonials	1989	2005	Closed in 2005 (Note: LIU Southampton's campus was later sold to Stony Brook University in 2006.)

=== Former affiliate members ===
The ECC has 19 former affiliate members, all but one of which are private schools.

Institution	Location	Founded	Affiliation	Enrollment	Nickname	Joined (Note: Represents the calendar year when fall sports competition begins.)	Left (Note: Represents the calendar year when spring sports competition ends.)	ECC sport(s)	Primary conference
Alliance University (Note: Formerly known as Nyack College until 2022.)	New York, New York	1882	C&MA	3,318	Warriors	2023	2024	men's volleyball	N/A (Note: Alliance was announced as a men's volleyball associate on May 17, 2023. However, the university later announced it would shut down permanently on September 1, 2023, before they had played a single game in the ECC during that school year.)
Bloomfield College	Bloomfield, New Jersey	1868	Presbyterian	2,100	Bears	2018	2022	women's bowling	Central Atlantic (CACC)
Bryant University	Smithfield, Rhode Island	1863	Nonsectarian	3,275	Bulldogs	2022	2026	women's bowling	America East (AmEast) (Note: Currently an NCAA Division I athletic conference.)
Caldwell University	Caldwell, New Jersey	1939	Catholic (Dominican Order)	1,800	Cougars	2018	2022	women's bowling	Central Atlantic (CACC)
Chestnut Hill College	Philadelphia, Pennsylvania	1924	Catholic (S.S.J.)	2,301	Griffins	2009^{m.lax.}	2017^{m.lax.}	men's lacrosse	Central Atlantic (CACC)
Chestnut Hill College	Philadelphia, Pennsylvania	1924	Catholic (S.S.J.)	2,301	Griffins	2017^{bowl.}	2022^{bowl.}	women's bowling	Central Atlantic (CACC)
Dominican College (Note: Currently known as Dominican University of New York since 2022.) (Note: Dominican (N.Y.) remains as an affiliate member of the ECC for men's volleyball since 2023–24.)	Orangeburg, New York	1952	Catholic (Dominican Sisters)	1,998	Chargers	2006	2017	men's lacrosse	Central Atlantic (CACC)
Felician University (Note: Felician remains as an affiliate member of the ECC for men's & women's indoor track & field since 2023–24.)	Rutherford, New Jersey	1923	Catholic (C.S.S.F.)	2,109	Golden Falcons	2015	2022	women's bowling	Central Atlantic (CACC)
Franklin Pierce University	Rindge, New Hampshire	1962	Nonsectarian	2,871	Ravens	2015	2018	women's bowling	Northeast-10 (NE-10)
Georgian Court University (Note: Georgian Court remains as an affiliate member of the ECC for men's & women's indoor track & field since 2013–14 and 2012–13 respectively.)	Lakewood, New Jersey	1908	Catholic	3,153	Lions	2012	2013	women's outdoor track & field	Central Atlantic (CACC)
Lake Erie College	Painesville, Ohio	1856	Nonsectarian	1,177	Storm	2009^{m.lax.}	2012^{m.lax.}	men's lacrosse	Great Midwest (G-MAC) (Note: During its tenure as an affiliate member of the ECC, Lake Erie was otherwise an NCAA D-II Independent during the 2009–10 school year, becoming a member of the Great Lakes Intercollegiate Athletic Conference (GLIAC) in 2010 and remaining in that conference through 2016–17.)
Lake Erie College	Painesville, Ohio	1856	Nonsectarian	1,177	Storm	2009^{w.lax.}	2012^{w.lax.}	women's lacrosse	Great Midwest (G-MAC)
Lincoln University	Chester County, Pennsylvania	1854	State-related (HBCU)	2,376	Lions	2019^{bsb.}	2024^{bsb.}	baseball	Central (CIAA)
Lincoln University	Chester County, Pennsylvania	1854	State-related (HBCU)	2,376	Lions	2019^{w.soc.}	2024^{w.soc.}	women's soccer	Central (CIAA)
Lincoln Memorial University	Harrogate, Tennessee	1897	Nonsectarian	4,867	Railsplitters	2016	2021	women's bowling	South Atlantic (SAC)
Mercyhurst University	Erie, Pennsylvania	1926	Catholic (R.S.M.)	3,217	Lakers	2005^{m.lax.}	2012^{m.lax.}	men's lacrosse	Northeast (NEC)
Mercyhurst University	Erie, Pennsylvania	1926	Catholic (R.S.M.)	3,217	Lakers	2019^{bowl.}	2024^{bowl.}	women's bowling	Northeast (NEC)
Post University	Waterbury, Connecticut	1890	For-profit	7,317	Eagles	2018^{m.i.t.f.}	2024^{m.i.t.f.}	men's indoor track & field	Central Atlantic (CACC)
Post University	Waterbury, Connecticut	1890	For-profit	7,317	Eagles	2018^{w.i.t.f.}	2024^{w.i.t.f.}	women's indoor track & field	Central Atlantic (CACC)
Salem University	Salem, West Virginia	1888	For-profit	835	Tigers	2016	2017	women's bowling	D-II Independent
Seton Hill University	Greensburg, Pennsylvania	1883	Catholic (S.C.S.H.)	2,014	Griffins	2009^{m.lax.}	2012^{m.lax.}	men's lacrosse	Pennsylvania (PSAC) (Note: During its tenure as an affiliate member of the ECC, Seton Hill's primary home conference was the West Virginia Intercollegiate Athletic Conference (WVIAC).)
Seton Hill University	Greensburg, Pennsylvania	1883	Catholic (S.C.S.H.)	2,014	Griffins	2009^{w.lax.}	2012^{w.lax.}	women's lacrosse	Pennsylvania (PSAC)
Tusculum University	Tusculum, Tennessee	1794	Presbyterian	2.053	Pioneers	2019	2021	women's bowling	South Atlantic (SAC)
Wheeling Jesuit University (Note: Currently known as Wheeling University since 2019.)	Wheeling, West Virginia	1954	Roman Catholic	1,600	Cardinals	2009	2012	men's lacrosse	Mountain East (MEC)
Wilmington University	New Castle, Delaware	1968	Nonsectarian	3,300	Wildcats	2017	2022	women's bowling	Central Atlantic (CACC)

=== Membership timeline ===
Full member (all sports) Full member (non-football) Associate member (football) Associate member (sport)

== Sports ==
The East Coast Conference sponsors intercollegiate athletic competition in the following sports:

Conference sports
Sport	Men's	Women's
Baseball	✓	
Basketball	✓	✓
Bowling		✓
Cross country	✓	✓
Field hockey		✓
Lacrosse	✓	✓
Soccer	✓	✓
Softball		✓
Tennis	✓	✓
Track & field indoor	✓	✓
Track & field outdoor	✓	✓
Volleyball	✓	✓

=== Men's sponsored sports by school ===
School	Baseball	Basketball	Cross country	Lacrosse	Soccer	Track & field indoor	Track & field outdoor	Volleyball (Note: De facto Division I sport. The NCAA sponsors a joint men's volleyball championship for Divisions I and II.)	Total ECC sports
Daemen		✓	✓		✓	✓	✓	(Note: Daemen and D'Youville currently play men's volleyball in the Division I NEC.)	5
District of Columbia		✓		✓	✓				3
D'Youville	✓	✓	✓	✓	✓	(Note: D'Youville will add men's indoor and outdoor track & field in 2027–28.)			5
Mercy	✓	✓		✓	✓			✓	5
Molloy	✓	✓	✓	✓	✓	✓	✓		7
Queens (NY)	✓	✓	✓		✓	✓	✓		6
Roberts Wesleyan		✓	✓	✓	✓	✓	✓	✓	7
St. Thomas Aquinas	✓	✓	✓	✓	✓	✓	✓	✓	8
Staten Island	✓	✓	✓		✓	✓	✓		6
Totals	6	9	7	6+1	9	6+3	6	3+2	52+7
Affiliate members
American International								✓	1
Dominican (NY)								✓	1
Frostburg State				✓					1
Georgian Court						✓			1
Holy Family						✓			1
Post						✓			1

=== Women's sponsored sports by school ===
School	Basketball	Bowling (Note: De facto Division I sport through the 2026–27 school year. The NCAA currently sponsors a single national bowling championship open to members of all three divisions. A separate Division II championship will be established in 2027–28.)	Cross country	Field hockey	Lacrosse	Soccer	Softball	Track & field indoor	Track & field outdoor	Volleyball	Total ECC sports
Daemen	✓	✓	✓		✓	✓		✓	✓	✓	8
District of Columbia	✓		✓		✓			✓	✓		5
D'Youville	✓	✓	✓	✓	✓	✓	✓			✓	8
Mercy	✓			✓	✓	✓	✓			✓	6
Molloy	✓	✓	✓	✓	✓	✓	✓	✓	✓	✓	10
Queens (NY)	✓		✓			✓	✓	✓	✓	✓	7
Roberts Wesleyan	✓	✓	✓	✓	✓	✓		✓	✓	✓	8
St. Thomas Aquinas	✓	✓	✓	✓	✓	✓	✓	✓	✓	✓	10
Staten Island	✓		✓			✓	✓	✓	✓	✓	7
Totals	9	5+3	8	5+1	7	8	6	7+3	7	8	65+7
Affiliate members
Adelphi		✓									1
Dominican (NY)				✓							1
Georgian Court								✓			1
Holy Family								✓			1
Kutztown		✓									1
Post								✓			1
Saint Anselm		✓									1

=== Other sponsored sports by school ===
School	Men				Women		
School	Golf	Sprint football (Note: A variant of American football governed outside the NCAA, with player weights restricted to 178 pounds (81 kg).)	Swimming & diving	Tennis	Fencing (Note: De facto Division I sport. The NCAA conducts a single women's fencing championship open to members of all three divisions.)	Swimming & diving	Tennis
Daemen				PSAC			PSAC
District of Columbia				IND			CACC
D'Youville		CSFL					PSAC
Molloy		CSFL					
Queens (NY)				IND	NIWFA		CACC
Roberts Wesleyan			GMAC			GMAC	
St. Thomas Aquinas	CACC	CSFL		IND			CACC
Staten Island			NE-10			NE-10	
