= ISIS Exposed =

2015 book by Erick Stakelbeck

- Author: Erick Stakelbeck
- Language: English
- Publisher: Regnery
- Publication date: March 9, 2015
- Publication place: United States
- Pages: 288
- ISBN: 978-1621573777

ISIS Exposed: Beheadings, Slavery, and the Hellish Reality of Radical Islam is a 2015 book by Erick Stakelbeck. The book focuses on the spread of Islamic State of Iraq and Syria (ISIS) followers and their terrorist actions in the West.

== Content ==
The book catalogues numerous instances of online radicalization to ISIS, and attacks by the group in the West. For the book, Stakelbeck travels to radicalization hotspots including Minneapolis-St. Paul, Denver, London, Amsterdam and Israel, where he interviews local officials about the local Muslims who joined ISIS. Stakelbeck also details atrocities committed by ISIS including beheadings, sex slavery, rape, murder and stoning.

== Reception ==
In the journal Perspectives on Terrorism, Joshua Sinai wrote that the book was "a well-written account by a veteran investigative television reporter of the origins and operations of ISIS in the Middle East, as well as the types of adherents in Western Europe and the United States who are being radicalized and mobilized into terrorism by ISIS and its allies."

In the journal Strategic Studies of the Institute of Strategic Studies Islamabad, Sarah Akrem wrote that the book "is a riveting account, told like a story from the journalist’s mouth that captures the reader’s attention," and that Stakelbeck "sheds light on how ISIS has engulfed the Middle East and the danger it poses to the world at large."

Writing for the Mackenzie Institute, Bernd Horn noted that Stakelbeck "has done a commendable job of cataloguing the numerous incidents of on-line radicalization and the subsequent attacks in support of ISIS in North America, England and Europe at large," but said that "on another level the book is disappointing. Its coverage of ISIS and its terrorist inspired activities suffers from a lack of in-depth analysis."
