= Erick Stakelbeck =

American author and television host

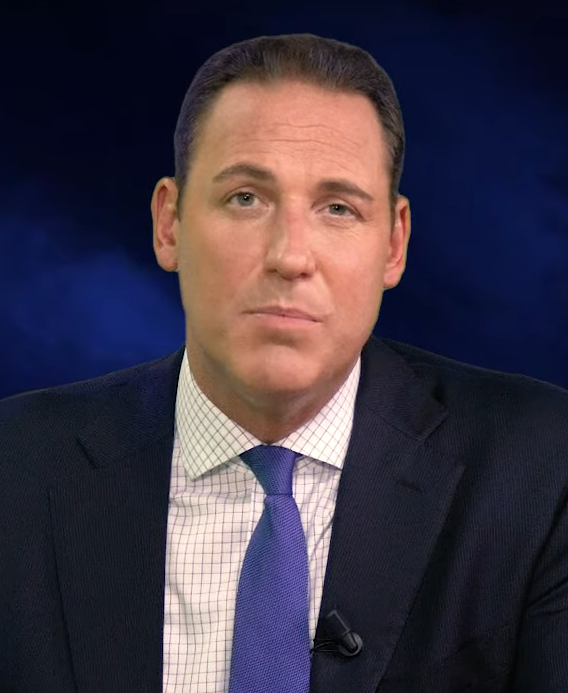
- Stakelbeck in 2024
- Born: January 21, 1976 (age 50)
- Education: Holy Family University
- Occupations: Television host; investigative reporter

YouTube information
- Channel: Erick Stakelbeck on TBN
- Years active: 2016–present
- Genres: Geopolitics; Israel
- Subscribers: 1.08 million
- Views: 207 million
- Last updated: October 6, 2025
- Website: erickstakelbeck.com

Erick Stakelbeck (born January 21, 1976) is an American television host and presenter of Stakelbeck Tonight on TBN and The Watchman Newscast on YouTube. As a Christian Zionist, his previous The Watchman show was sponsored by Christians United for Israel, Stakelbeck being the director of its Watchman Project. Stakelbeck has also been noted as an investigative reporter and author on radical Islam, and is TBN's news director.

== Early life ==
Stakelbeck had a working-class upbringing in Philadelphia, with his father, who was a factory electrician by trade, also being "an autodidact who loved to study biblical history." Growing up in the Fox Chase neighborhood, Stakelbeck graduated from the Holy Family University in the same city. While a long-time supporter of Israel, he also became increasingly drawn to studying the roots of Islamic terrorism after the September 11 attacks, and began writing articles for FrontPage Magazine.

== Television career ==
Stakelbeck worked as a senior writer and analyst at the Investigative Project on Terrorism from 2003 to 2005, and his articles appeared in several newspapers. From 2005 he worked as a television correspondent, host and analyst for CBN News, where he covered "U.S. national security, the Middle East, Israel-related issues and the growth of radical Islam at home and abroad." He hosted the show Stakelbeck on Terror on CBN from 2010, and The Watchman from 2013. He has also been a regular contributor and guest host on The Blaze TV, and a regular guest on several Fox News shows. He received the Ben Hecht Award for Outstanding Journalism from the Zionist Organization of America in 2014, and a media "Truth" award from the Endowment for Middle East Truth in 2015.

Stakelbeck began hosting The Watchman on TBN in 2016. For his show, he has travelled throughout Israel, reporting from the borders of Gaza, Syria and Lebanon, and interviewing senior Israeli leaders. He regularly highlights Israel's "strategic predicament", noting its proximity to radical Islamic terror groups such as Hezbollah and Hamas at its borders. He also focuses on biblical end times prophecy, believing that "we live in prophetic times", and that "the miraculous rebirth of Israel ... set the prophetic time clock into overdrive". He additionally became a correspondent for TBN's new Centerpoint, a nightly news and analysis program in 2022, and host of the new show Stakelbeck Tonight in 2024 which replaced The Watchman.

Stakelbeck recorded an exclusive interview with Israeli prime minister Benjamin Netanyahu in 2022, and with then-former US president and presidential candidate Donald Trump in 2024.

== Views ==
Stakelbeck has addressed several conferences and events of conservative groups such as ACT for America, the David Horowitz Freedom Center and the Family Research Council, including the Values Voter Summit, as well as the U.S. Department of Homeland Security, the American-Israel Public Affairs Committee, the Israel Allies Foundation, the Jewish Institute for National Security Affairs, and has aligned himself with counter-jihad activists. (Note: Stakelbeck has himself repeatedly referred to people he has interviewed supportingly as "counter-jihad activists":)

He has stated his view that "the Left sees Islam as an ally and Western Civilization and the Judeo-Christian tradition is the enemy" and that Islam and the Left "have a shared hatred for this country". He also claims that there is a "concerted effort by Islamists to infiltrate the very heartland of American society" and that American Muslims are engaged in "stealth" or "civilizational" jihad to impose Sharia in the US.

== Personal life ==
Stakelbeck is married and has two daughters, and lived in the Dallas–Fort Worth area as of 2024. He previously lived outside Washington, D.C.

== Bibliography ==
Stakelbeck has authored the following books:

- The Terrorist Next Door: How the Government is Deceiving You About the Islamist Threat. Regnery. 2011. ISBN 978-1596981522.
- The Brotherhood: America's Next Great Enemy. Regnery. 2013. ISBN 978-1621570332.
- ISIS Exposed: Beheadings, Slavery, and the Hellish Reality of Radical Islam. Regnery. 2015. ISBN 978-1621573777.
