= Central Atlantic Collegiate Conference =

Athletic conference in north-eastern US

- Association: NCAA
- Founded: 1961
- Commissioner: Daniel Mara (since 2006)
- Sports fielded: 17; men's: 8; women's: 9
- Division: Division II
- No. of teams: 11 (12 in 2027)
- Headquarters: New Haven, Connecticut
- Region: Atlantic Coast
- Website: caccathletics.org

Locations
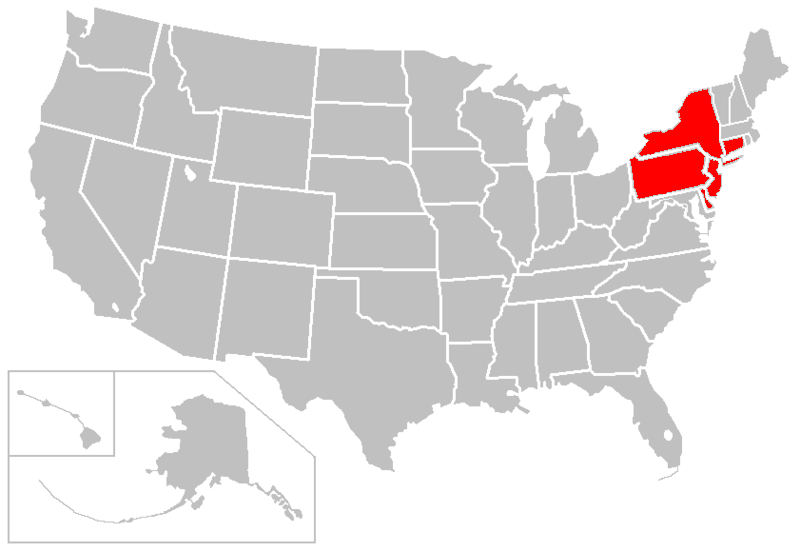

The Central Atlantic Collegiate Conference (or CACC) is a college athletic conference affiliated with the National Collegiate Athletic Association (NCAA) at the Division II level. Its eleven member institutions are located in the northeastern United States in the states of Connecticut, Delaware, New Jersey, New York, and Pennsylvania.

The CACC was founded in 1961 as an athletic conference affiliated with the National Association of Intercollegiate Athletics (NAIA), and later joined the NCAA in 2002 on provisional status. The CACC Conference Office has been located in New Haven, Connecticut since 2004, the same year that it upgraded to full active status. The CACC has three full-time staff members and one part-time.

== History ==
Central Atlantic Collegiate Conference
Location of CACC members: full, future

=== Recent events ===
On August 2, 2022, the CACC announced that it added bowling, a women-only sport in the NCAA, that began in the 2023 spring season (2022–23 academic year), with full members Bloomfield, Caldwell, Chestnut Hill, Felician, Holy Family, and Wilmington as the inaugural teams. All but Holy Family, which launched its varsity team in 2022–23, had previously been affiliates of the East Coast Conference in that sport.

On November 28, 2023, Lincoln University of Pennsylvania accepted an invitation to join the CACC as an associate member in baseball and women's soccer, beginning the 2024–25 academic year.

On November 6, 2025, the conference announced its addition of Monroe University, pending Monroe's acceptance into Division II. On May 26, 2026, Monroe reported that it will apply for NCAA membership in the 2027–28 academic year by October 1.

=== Chronological timeline ===
- 1961 – The Central Atlantic Collegiate Conference (CACC) was founded. Charter members included Bloomfield College (now Bloomfield College of Montclair State University), Adelphi Suffolk College (later Dowling College), The King's College, the C. W. Post Campus of Long Island University, Southampton College of Long Island University, Marist College (now Marist University), Monmouth College of New Jersey and Nyack College (later Alliance University), beginning the 1961–62 academic year.
- 1965 – St. Thomas Aquinas College joined the CACC in the 1965–66 academic year.
- 1981 – Marist left the CACC to join the Division I ranks of the National Collegiate Athletic Association (NCAA) and the ECAC Metro Conference (now known as the Northeast Conference) after the 1980–81 academic year.
- 1982 – Dominican College of New York (now Dominican University New York) joined the CACC in the 1982–83 academic year.
- 1983 – Georgian Court College (now Georgian Court University) joined the CACC in the 1983–84 academic year.
- 1985 – Monmouth (N.J.) left the CACC to fully align with the NCAA Division I ranks and join the ECAC Metro after the 1984–85 academic year.
- 1987 – Caldwell College (now Caldwell University) and Post College (now Post University) joined the CACC in the 1987–88 academic year.
- 1989 – Four institutions left the CACC to join their respective new home primary conferences, all effective after the 1988–89 academic year:
  - Dowling, LIU Post and LIU Southampton join the New York Collegiate Athletic Conference [NYCAC; now known as the East Coast Conference (ECC)]
  - and King's College as an Independent
- 1999:
  - St. Thomas Aquinas left the CACC to join the NCAA Division II ranks as an NCAA D-II Independent (which would later join the NYCAC) beginning the 2000–01 school year.) after the 1998–99 academic year.
  - Felician College (now Felician University), Goldey–Beacom College, Holy Family College (now Holy Family University), the University of the Sciences in Philadelphia (USP; later the University of the Sciences before being absorbed by Saint Joseph's University in 2022) and Wilmington College of Delaware (now Wilmington University) joined the CACC in the 1999–2000 academic year.
- 2000 – The New Jersey Institute of Technology (NJIT) joined the CACC in the 2000–01 academic year.
- 2002 – The CACC was granted provisional membership status within the National Collegiate Athletic Association (NCAA) at the Division II ranks, transitioning from the National Association of Intercollegiate Athletics (NAIA), beginning the 2002–03 academic year.
- 2004 – The CACC had achieved full membership status within the NCAA Division II ranks in the 2004–05 academic year.
- 2005 – Philadelphia University (now Thomas Jefferson University) joined the CACC in the 2005–06 academic year.
- 2006 – NJIT left the CACC to join the NCAA Division I ranks as an NCAA D-I Independent after the 2005–06 academic year.
- 2007 – Chestnut Hill College joined the CACC in the 2007–08 academic year.
- 2009 – Concordia College of New York joined the CACC in the 2009–10 academic year.
- 2017 – The CACC began sponsoring men's lacrosse, with play starting in the 2018 spring season (2017–18 academic year).
- 2021 – Concordia (N.Y.) left the CACC as the school announced that it would close at the end of the 2020–21 academic year.
- 2022:
  - USciences left the CACC when it merged into Saint Joseph's University at the end of the 2021–22 academic year.
  - The University of Bridgeport joined the CACC in the 2022–23 academic year.
  - The CACC began sponsoring bowling, a women-only sport in the NCAA, with play starting the 2023 spring season (2022–23 academic year), with full members Bloomfield, Caldwell, Chestnut Hill, Felician, Holy Family, and Wilmington as the inaugural teams. All but Holy Family, which launched its varsity team in 2022–23, had previously been affiliates of the East Coast Conference in that sport.
- 2023 – Alliance left the CACC as the school announced that it would close at the end of the 2022–23 academic year.
- 2024 – Lincoln University of Pennsylvania joined the CACC as an associate member for baseball and women's soccer in the 2024–25 academic year.
- 2025 – Bloomfield left the CACC and the NCAA to join the United States Collegiate Athletic Association (USCAA) as an Independent after the 2024–25 academic year.
- 2026 – Three institutions joined the CACC as associate members, all effective in the 2026–27 academic year:
  - the University of the District of Columbia (UDC) and Queens College for women's tennis
  - and St. Thomas Aquinas College for men's golf and women's tennis
- 2027 – Monroe University will join the CACC, beginning the 2027–28 academic year; pending its acceptance into NCAA Division II.

== Member schools ==
=== Current members ===
The CACC currently has 11 full members, all are private schools:

Institution	Location	Founded	Affiliation	Enrollment	Nickname	Joined (Note: Represents the calendar year when fall sports competition begins.)	Colors
University of Bridgeport	Bridgeport, Connecticut	1927	Nonsectarian	3,838	Purple Knights	2022	
Caldwell University	Caldwell, New Jersey	1939	Catholic (OP)	2,193	Cougars	1987	
Chestnut Hill College	Philadelphia, Pennsylvania	1924	Catholic (CSJ)	1,417	Griffins	2007	
Dominican University New York	Orangeburg, New York	1952	Catholic (DS)	1,083	Chargers	1982	
Felician University	Rutherford, New Jersey	1923	Catholic (CSSF)	2,427	Golden Falcons	1999	
Georgian Court University (Note: This institution was a women's college, but has since then been a co-educational institution, therefore it does compete in some men's sports (Georgian Court since 2013–14).)	Lakewood, New Jersey	1908	Catholic (RSM)	1,910	Lions	1983	
Goldey–Beacom College	Wilmington, Delaware	1886	Nonsectarian	1,074	Lightning	1999	
Holy Family University	Philadelphia, Pennsylvania	1954	Catholic (C.S.F.N.)	3,278	Tigers	1999	
Post University	Waterbury, Connecticut	1890	For-profit	21,699	Eagles	1987	
Thomas Jefferson University (Note: Jefferson joined the CACC as Philadelphia University. In 2017, PhilaU merged with Thomas Jefferson University, a healthcare-only institution with no athletic program, with the merged institution taking the Thomas Jefferson name. The former PhilaU athletic program has since competed as the Jefferson Rams.)	Philadelphia, Pennsylvania	1824	Nonsectarian	8,315	Rams	2005	
Wilmington University	New Castle, Delaware	1968	Nonsectarian	20,384	Wildcats	1999	

=== Future members ===
Institution	Location	Founded	Affiliation	Enrollment	Nickname	Joining (Note: Represents the calendar year when fall sports competition begins.)	Colors	Primary conference
Monroe University	New Rochelle, New York	1933	For-profit	7,924	Mustangs	2027		Independent (NJCAA Region XV)

=== Associate members ===
Institution	Location	Founded	Affiliation	Enrollment	Nickname	Joined (Note: Represents the calendar year when fall sports competition begins.)	Colors	CACC sport(s)	Primary conference
University of the District of Columbia	Washington, D.C.	1851	Public (HBCU)	4,202	Firebirds	2026		Women's tennis	East Coast (ECC)
Lincoln University	Chester County, Pennsylvania	1854	State-related (HBCU)	1,848	Lions	2024		Baseball	Central (CIAA)
Lincoln University	Chester County, Pennsylvania	1854	State-related (HBCU)	1,848	Lions	2024		Women's soccer	Central (CIAA)
Queens College	Queens, New York	1937	Public	15,965	Knights	2026		Women's tennis	East Coast (ECC)
St. Thomas Aquinas College	Sparkill, New York	1952	Catholic	1,950	Spartans	2026 (Note: St. Thomas Aquinas was a full member of the CACC from 1965–66 to 1998–99.)		Women's tennis	East Coast (ECC)
St. Thomas Aquinas College	Sparkill, New York	1952	Catholic	1,950	Spartans	2026		Men's golf	East Coast (ECC)

=== Former members ===
The CACC had twelve former full members; all but two were private schools.

Institution	Location	Founded	Affiliation	Enrollment	Nickname	Joined (Note: Represents the calendar year when fall sports competition begins.)	Left (Note: Represents the calendar year when spring sports competition ends.)	Current conference
Alliance University (Note: Formerly known as Nyack College until 2022.)	New York City, New York	1882	Christian (C&MA)	3,318	Warriors	1961	2023	Closed in 2023
Bloomfield College (of Montclair State)	Bloomfield, New Jersey	1868	Public (Note: Bloomfield was a private institution affiliated with the Presbyterian Church (USA) when it joined the CACC. In 2023, it agreed to a merger with Montclair State University, who subsequently assumed control of the college.)	1,533	Bears	1961	2025	North American (NACIA) (Note: Currently a USCAA athletic conference.)
Concordia College	Bronxville, New York	1881	Lutheran LCMS	N/A	Clippers	2009	2021	Closed in 2021 (Note: Concordia (N.Y.)'s campus was later sold to nearby Iona College (now Iona University).)
Dowling College	Oakdale, New York	1955	Nonsectarian	N/A	Golden Lions	1961	1989	Closed in 2016
The King's College	New York City, New York	1938	Christian (Nondenominational)	550	Lions	1961	1989	Closed in 2025
Long Island University–Post	Brookville, New York	1954	Nonsectarian	8,472	Pioneers	1961	1989	Northeast (NEC) (Note: Currently an NCAA Division I athletic conference.) (Note: Long Island University merged the Post athletic program with the NCAA Division I program of its Brooklyn campus in 2019. The merged program inherited the Division I membership of the Brooklyn campus, and now competes in the Northeast Conference as the LIU Sharks.)
Marist College (Note: Currently known as Marist University since 2025.)	Poughkeepsie, New York	1929	Nonsectarian (Note: Marist was a Catholic institution operated by the Marist Brothers when it joined the CACC. In 1969, control of the college was transferred from the order to a separate organization primarily staffed by laypeople. Marist is now officially nonsectarian, but it was not treated as such by the Catholic Church until 2003, long after leaving the CACC.)	6,624	Red Foxes	1961	1981	Metro Atlantic (MAAC)
Monmouth University	West Long Branch, New Jersey	1933	Nonsectarian	6,167	Hawks	1961	1985	Coastal (CAA)
New Jersey Institute of Technology	Newark, New Jersey	1968	Public	11,652	Highlanders	2000	2006	America East (AmEast)
St. Thomas Aquinas College	Sparkill, New York	1952	Catholic (D.S.S.)	2,400	Spartans	1965	1999	East Coast (ECC)
University of the Sciences	Philadelphia, Pennsylvania	1821	Nonsectarian	2,749	Devils	1998	2022	Closed in 2022 (Note: USciences merged with Division I Saint Joseph's University and discontinued athletics following the 2021–22 school year.)
Southampton College of Long Island University	Southampton, New York	1963	Nonsectarian	N/A	Colonials	1961	1989	Closed in 2005 (Note: LIU Southampton's campus was later sold to Stony Brook University in 2006.)

=== Membership timeline ===
Full member (all sports) Full member (non-football) Associate member (football) Associate member (sport)

== Sports ==
A divisional format is used for baseball, men's & women's basketball, and volleyball. In baseball, Georgian Court is placed in the North Division.
North
- Bridgeport
- Caldwell
- Dominican
- Felician
- Post
South
- Chestnut Hill
- Georgian Court
- Goldey–Beacom
- Holy Family
- Jefferson
- Wilmington

Conference sports
Sport	Men's	Women's
Baseball	✓	
Basketball	✓	✓
Bowling		✓
Cross Country	✓	✓
Golf	✓	
Lacrosse	✓	✓
Soccer	✓	✓
Softball		✓
Tennis	✓	✓
Track & Field Outdoor	✓	✓
Volleyball		✓

=== Men's sponsored sports by school ===
School	Baseball	Basketball	Cross country	Golf	Lacrosse	Soccer	Track & field outdoor	Total CACC sports
Bridgeport	✓	✓	✓		✓	✓		5
Caldwell	✓	✓	✓		✓	✓	✓	6
Chestnut Hill	✓	✓	✓	✓	✓	✓	✓	7
Dominican	✓	✓	✓	✓	✓	✓	✓	7
Felician	✓	✓	✓	✓	✓	✓		6
Georgian Court	✓	✓	✓		✓	✓	✓	6
Goldey–Beacom	✓	✓	✓			✓	✓	5
Holy Family	✓	✓	✓		✓	✓	✓	6
Jefferson	✓	✓	✓	✓		✓	✓	6
Post	✓	✓	✓	✓	✓	✓	✓	7
Wilmington	✓	✓	✓	✓	✓	✓	✓	7
Totals	11+1 (Note: Affiliate member Lincoln.)	11	11	6+1 (Note: Affiliate member St. Thomas Aquinas.)	9	11	9	74+2

=== Women's sponsored sports by school ===
School	Basketball	Bowling (Note: De facto Division I sport through 2026–27. The NCAA currently operates a single championship in bowling open to members of all three divisions, but a separate D-II championship will be established in 2027–28.)	Cross country	Lacrosse	Soccer	Softball	Tennis	Track & field outdoor	Volleyball	Total CACC sports
Bridgeport	✓		✓	✓	✓	✓			✓	6
Caldwell	✓	✓	✓	✓	✓	✓		✓	✓	8
Chestnut Hill	✓	✓	✓	✓	✓	✓	✓	✓	✓	9
Dominican	✓		✓	✓	✓	✓		✓	✓	7
Felician	✓	✓	✓	✓	✓	✓		✓	✓	8
Georgian Court	✓		✓	✓	✓	✓		✓	✓	7
Goldey–Beacom	✓		✓		✓	✓		✓	✓	6
Holy Family	✓	✓	✓	✓	✓	✓		✓	✓	8
Jefferson	✓		✓	✓	✓	✓	✓	✓	✓	8
Post	✓		✓	✓	✓	✓	✓	✓	✓	8
Wilmington	✓	✓	✓	✓	✓	✓	✓	✓	✓	9
Totals	11	5	11	10	11+1 (Note: Affiliate member Lincoln.)	11	4+3 (Note: Affiliate members UDC, Queens, and St. Thomas Aquinas.)	10	11	84+4

=== Other sponsored sports by school ===
School	Men							Women						
School	Football	Ice hockey	Swimming & diving	Tennis	Track & field indoor	Volleyball (Note: De facto Division I sport. The NCAA conducts combined national championships open to Division I and Division II members in both women's ice hockey and men's volleyball, and a single national women's gymnastics championship open to all NCAA members.)	Wrestling	Field hockey	Golf	Gymnastics	Ice hockey	Rowing	Swimming & diving	Track & field indoor
Bridgeport			NE-10				IND			GEC			NE-10	
Chestnut Hill				PSAC										
Dominican						ECC		ECC						
Felician			NE-10				IND						NE-10	
Georgian Court					ECC									ECC
Holy Family					ECC									ECC
Jefferson				PSAC					NE-10			IND		
Post	NE-10	NE-10			ECC				IND		NEWHA			ECC
