= Holy Family University =

Catholic university in Philadelphia, Pennsylvania, US

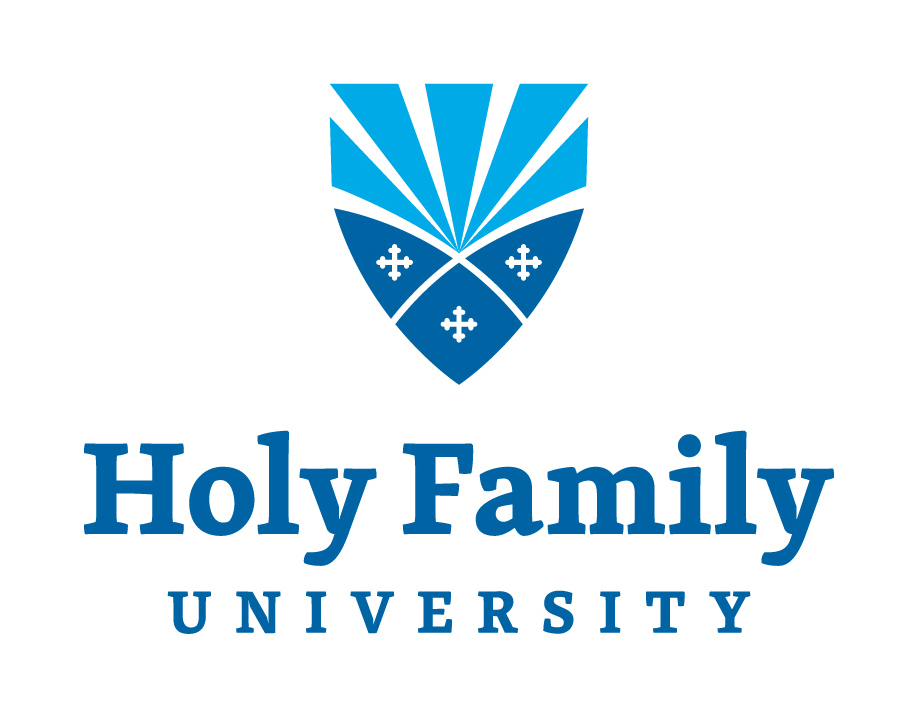
- Former name: Holy Family College (1954–2002)
- Motto: Teneor votis
- Motto in English: I am bound by my responsibilities
- Type: Private university
- Established: 1954; 72 years ago
- Religious affiliation: Roman Catholic
- Academic affiliations: ACCU; NAICU; CIC
- President: Anne M. Prisco
- Students: 3,119 (fall 2024)
- Undergraduates: 2,650 (fall 2024)
- Postgraduates: 469 (fall 2024)
- Location: Philadelphia, Pennsylvania, U.S. 40.060°N 74.988°W
- Campus: Urban
- Colors: Dark blue, light blue, white
- Nickname: Tigers
- Sporting affiliations: NCAA Division II – CACC
- Mascot: Blue the Tiger
- Website: www.holyfamily.edu

Holy Family University is a private Catholic university in Philadelphia, Pennsylvania, United States. It was founded in 1954 and has four schools: Arts & Sciences, Business & Technology, Education, and Nursing & Health Sciences. Its main campus in Philadelphia is in the northeastern section of the city and it has a satellite location in Newtown, Bucks County. Holy Family enrolls 3,600 students at the undergraduate and graduate levels. It is also a sponsored ministry of the Sisters of the Holy Family of Nazareth.

== History ==
Holy Family University was founded in 1954 by the Sisters of the Holy Family of Nazareth as Holy Family Teacher Training School. During the early years, the college functioned as an affiliate of the Catholic University of America. The graduate programs in education were approved by the Pennsylvania Department of Education in March 1990, followed by the Nursing and Counseling Psychology programs in 1997, and the Accelerated Business Administration program in 2003. The graduate program in Criminal Justice was approved in 2007. The graduate program in TESOL and Literacy was approved in 2008. The doctoral program in Educational Leadership and Professional Studies was approved in 2010.

Holy Family is the youngest of the four Catholic universities in the city of Philadelphia; the others are Saint Joseph's, La Salle, and Chestnut Hill College.

=== Presidents ===
1. Neomisia Rutkowska (1954–1959)
2. Aloysius Sabacinska (1959–1971)
3. Lillian Budny (1971–1981)
4. Francesca Onley (1981–2014)
5. Maureen McGarrity (2014–2021)
6. Anne M. Prisco (2021–present)

== Academics ==
Holy Family University is divided into four schools:

- Arts & Sciences
- Business & Technology
- Education
- Nursing & Health Sciences

In January 2011, a doctoral program was introduced for those pursuing a Doctor of Education in Educational Leadership and Professional Studies. This was followed by a Doctor of Nursing Practice in 2017, and a Doctor of Psychology was introduced in 2019.

== Athletics ==
Holy Family University has 18 varsity sports teams; 10 women's, seven men's and one coed (Esports). Its nickname is the Tigers and their colors are blue and white.

HFU is a member of NCAA Division II and the Central Atlantic Collegiate Conference (CACC), which is composed of 13 colleges and universities located in Connecticut, Delaware, New Jersey, New York and Pennsylvania. The women's flag football team plays in the NCAA Division III Atlantic East Conference.

Holy Family's women's teams are basketball, cross-country running, flag football, lacrosse, soccer, softball, indoor and outdoor track & field and volleyball. The HFU women have won a total of 22 CACC Championships, with women's basketball winning eight and women's soccer winning seven. Women's lacrosse (three) and volleyball (two) have also captured multiple championships.

Holy Family's men's teams consist of baseball, basketball, cross country, lacrosse, soccer, and indoor and outdoor track & field. The men's basketball team won the CACC Championship in 2015–16.

== Notable alumni ==
- Gene DiGirolamo (born 1950), Republican member of the Pennsylvania House of Representatives
- Ryan Lancaster (born 1985), basketball player
- Erick Stakelbeck (born 1976), author and television host
