= Wilmington Wildcats =

Wilmington University Wildcats
- University: Wilmington University
- Nickname: Wildcats
- NCAA: Division II
- Conference: CACC
- Athletic director: Stefanie Whitby
- Location: New Castle, Delaware
- Varsity teams: 17
- Basketball arena: Wilmington University Athletics Complex
- Baseball stadium: Wilson Field at Jim Sherman Sr. Stadium
- Colors: Green and Gold
- Mascot: Wiley D. Wildcat
- Website: wildcats.athletics.wilmu.edu

The Wilmington University Wildcats, also referred to as the WilmU Wildcats, are the athletic teams that represent Wilmington University, located in New Castle, Delaware, in NCAA Division II intercollegiate sports. Most of the university's athletics facilities are at the Wilmington University Athletics Complex in Newark, rather than on its main campus in New Castle.

The Wildcats are full members of the Central Atlantic Collegiate Conference, which is home to 16 of its 17 athletic programs. The women's bowling team competes in East Coast Conference. Wilmington has been a member of the CACC since 1999.

== History ==
=== Wildcats mascot ===
The university's present mascot was unveiled in 2009. Following the announcement of the school's new mascot, the university involved students and faculty in a popular poll to suggest and choose a name for this new addition to Wilmington University's athletic presence. In late 2009, it was announced that the name "Wiley D. Wildcat," suggested by one of the students of Wilmington University, had won the poll and would become the mascot's official name. In addition to the mascot's presence at most NCAA Division II athletic events, the Wildcat mascot has become an instrumental part of the university's national-champion cheerleading team.

== Varsity teams ==
=== List of teams ===
Men's sports (7)

- Baseball
- Basketball
- Cross Country
- Golf
- Lacrosse
- Soccer
- Track and field

Women's sports (10)

- Basketball
- Bowling
- Cheerleading
- Cross country
- Lacrosse
- Soccer
- Softball
- Tennis
- Track and field
- Volleyball

== Individual teams ==
=== Baseball ===
The university's men's baseball team was named NCAA Division II East Regional champions in 2015 after a historic season.

=== Cheerleading ===
In addition to its NCAA Division II men's and women's athletic teams, Wilmington University is also home to a successful, co-ed cheerleading team. The university's cheerleading team was named the Universal Cheerleading Association's national champions for five consecutive years between 2012 and 2017.

=== Golf ===
Additionally, the men's golf team earned an NCAA Division II Atlantic/East Super Regional title in both 2012 and 2015.
