= NCAA Division II independent schools =

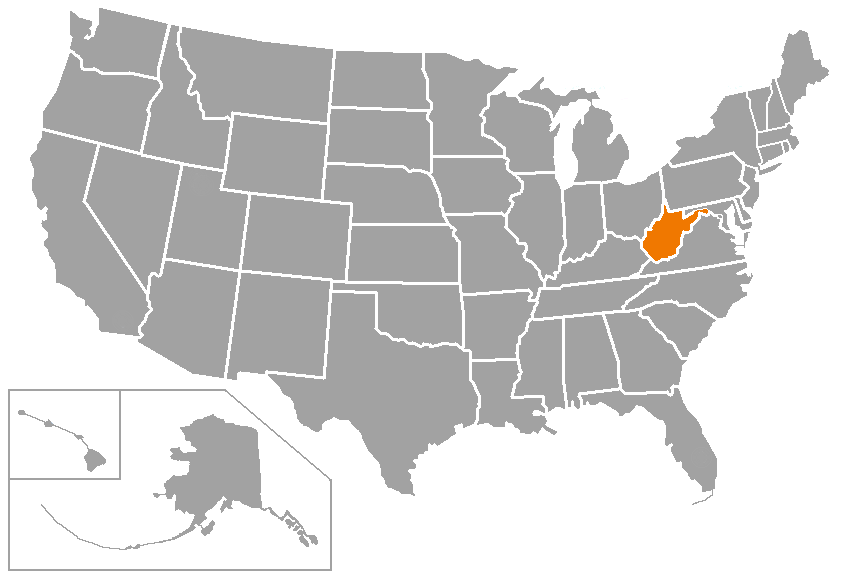
Map of full NCAA Division II Independent schools

NCAA Division II independent schools are four-year institutions that compete in college athletics at the National Collegiate Athletic Association (NCAA) at the Division II level, but do not belong to an established college athletic conference for a particular sport. These schools may however still compete as members of an athletic conference in other sports. A school may also be fully independent, and not belong to any athletic conference for any sport at all. The reason for independent status varies among institutions, but it is frequently because the school's primary athletic conference does not sponsor a particular sport.

== Full independents ==
Division II was created in 1973, at a time when the NCAA included dozens of independent members, plus members of conferences who played as independents in one or more sports. The trend toward consolidating the NCAA membership into conferences began in the late 1970s, and within a decade the number of independent programs declined dramatically. The lists below include only the small number of programs still functioning on an independent basis in recent years.

=== Current members ===
Institution	Location	Founded	Affiliation	Enrollment	Nickname	Joined (Note: Represents the calendar year when fall sports competition begins.)	Colors	Future conference
University of Puerto Rico at Bayamón (Note: Also competing as a full member of the Inter-university Athletic League of Puerto Rico (a.k.a. Liga Atlética Interuniversitaria de Puerto Rico or LAI).)	Bayamón, Puerto Rico	1971	Public (Note: Part of the University of Puerto Rico (UPR) System.)	2,967	Cowboys	?		
University of Puerto Rico at Mayagüez	Mayagüez, Puerto Rico	1911	Public	10,716	Bulldogs	?		
University of Puerto Rico, Río Piedras	San Juan, Puerto Rico	1903	Public	11,493	Gallitos & Jerezanas	?		
Salem University (Note: For the 2023–24 and the 2024–25 school years, Salem entered into a non-conference scheduling agreement with the Mountain East Conference for baseball, men's and women's basketball, men's and women's soccer, softball, and women's volleyball.)	Salem, West Virginia	1888	Private (For-profit)	894	Tigers	2010; 2016 (Note: Salem left the Independent ranks after the 2012–13 school year; before re-joining in 2016–17.)		River States (NAIA; in 2027)

=== Former members ===
Institution	Location	Founded	Affiliation	Enrollment	Nickname	Joined (Note: Represents the calendar year when fall sports competition begins.)	Left (Note: Represents the calendar year when spring sports competition ends.)	Colors	Current conference
Bluefield State University (Note: Formerly known as Bluefield State College until 2023.)	Bluefield, West Virginia	1895	Public (Note: Also a historically black college and university.)	1,246	Big Blue	2013	2023		Central (CIAA)
University of Denver	Denver, Colorado	1864	Nonsectarian	14,130	Pioneers	1990	1998		West Coast (WCC) (Note: Currently an NCAA Division I athletic conference.)
Emory & Henry University (Note: Formerly an NCAA Division III school.) (Note: Formerly known as Emory & Henry College until 2024.)	Emory, Virginia	1836	Private	1,250	Wasps	2021	2022		South Atlantic (SAC)
Mount St. Mary's University	Emmitsburg, Maryland (Note: The Mount St. Mary's campus has an Emmitsburg mailing address, but is located in unincorporated Frederick County.)	1808	Catholic (Archdiocese of Baltimore)	1,889	Mountaineers	1978	1983		Metro
Oakland City University	Oakland City, Indiana	1885	Private	2,350	Mighty Oaks	2006	2020		River States (RSC) (Note: Currently an NAIA athletic conference.)
University of California, Irvine (UC Irvine)	Irvine, California	1965	Public	37,243	Anteaters	1965	1977		Big West (BWC)
University of California, Riverside (UC Riverside)	Riverside, California	1954	Public	26,809	Highlanders	2000	2001		Big West (BWC)
University of Wisconsin–Green Bay (Green Bay, UW Green Bay)	Green Bay, Wisconsin	1965	Public	11,188	Phoenix	1973	1981		Horizon
University of Wisconsin–Milwaukee (Milwaukee, UW Milwaukee)	Milwaukee, Wisconsin	1956	Public	22,481	Panthers	1964	1973		Horizon
University of Wisconsin–Milwaukee (Milwaukee, UW Milwaukee)	Milwaukee, Wisconsin	1956	Public	22,481	Panthers	1987	1990		Horizon
Wright State University	Fairborn, Ohio (Note: The Wright State campus is physically located in Fairborn but has a Dayton mailing address.)	1964	Public	17,074	Raiders	1970	1987		Horizon
Youngstown State University	Youngstown, Ohio	1908	Public	15,058	Penguins	1960	1981		Horizon

=== Men's sponsored sports by school ===
Departing members in pink.

School	Baseball	Basketball	Cross country	Soccer	Tennis	Track & field outdoor	Volleyball	Wrestling	Total IND sports
UPR Bayamón		✓	✓	✓	✓		✓		5
UPR Mayagüez		✓	✓		✓	✓	✓		5
UPR Río Piedras		✓	✓		✓	✓	✓		5
Salem	✓	✓		MEC	✓			MEC	5

=== Women's sponsored sports by school ===
Departing members in pink.

School	Basketball	Cross country	Soccer	Softball	Tennis	Track & field outdoor	Volleyball	Total IND sports
UPR Bayamón	✓	✓	✓		✓		✓	5
UPR Mayagüez	✓	✓			✓	✓	✓	5
UPR Río Piedras	✓	✓			✓	✓	✓	5
Salem	✓		✓	✓	✓		PBC	5

=== Other sponsored sports by school ===
School	Men		Women	
School	Swimming & diving	Water polo ^{‡}	Swimming & diving	Water polo ^{‡}
Salem	MEC	WWPA	MEC	WWPA

- ^{‡} — D-I sport

== Baseball independents ==
Does not include all-sports independent teams that sponsor the sport (Salem), since they have been listed before.

=== Current members ===
Institution	Location	Nickname	Primary conference
Bluefield State University	Bluefield, West Virginia	Big Blue	CIAA
Virginia State University	Ettrick, Virginia	Trojans	CIAA

== Football independents ==
Does not include all-sports independent teams that sponsor the sport, since they have been listed before.

=== Current members ===
Institution	Location	Nickname	Primary conference
Northeastern State University	Tahlequah, Oklahoma	RiverHawks	MIAA

== Soccer independents ==
Does not include all-sports independent teams that sponsor the sport (UPR Bayamón men's soccer and UPR Bayamón, UPR Río Piedras and Salem women's soccer), since they have been listed before. Both Jamestown and Shaw men's soccer programs will join new conferences as affiliate members for men's soccer beginning with the 2027 season: Jamestown to the Great Northwest Athletic Conference and Shaw to Conference Carolinas.

=== Current members ===
Institution	Location	Nickname	Primary conference	(M)	(W)
Allen University	Columbia, South Carolina	Yellow Jackets	SIAC		✓
Bluefield State University	Bluefield, West Virginia	Big Blue	CIAA		✓
Edward Waters University	Jacksonville, Florida	Lady Tigers	SIAC		✓
University of Jamestown	Jamestown, North Dakota	Jimmies	NSIC	✓	
Shaw University	Raleigh, North Carolina	Bears	CIAA	✓	✓
Tuskegee University	Tuskegee, Alabama	Tigers	SIAC	✓	✓
Virginia State University	Ettrick, Virginia	Trojans	CIAA	✓	✓

== Men's wrestling independents ==
Does not include all-sports independent teams that sponsor the sport (UPR Mayagüez), since they have been listed before. Simon Fraser will leave NCAA Division II to join the Canadian-based U Sports in 2027.

=== Current members ===
Institution	Location	Nickname	Primary conference
University of Bridgeport	Bridgeport, Connecticut	Purple Knights	CACC
Felician University	Rutherford, New Jersey	Golden Falcons	CACC
Simon Fraser University	Burnaby, British Columbia	Red Leafs	GNAC

== Other sports ==
=== Golf ===
Does not include all-sports independent teams that sponsor the sport, since they have been listed before.

Institution	Location	Nickname	Primary conference	(M)	(W)
Bluefield State University	Bluefield, West Virginia	Big Blue	CIAA		✓
Daemen University	Amherst, New York	Wildcats	ECC	✓	
Post University	Waterbury, Connecticut	Eagles	CACC		✓
Roberts Wesleyan University	Chili, New York	Redhawks	ECC	✓	
St. Thomas Aquinas College	Sparkill, New York	Spartans	ECC	✓	

=== Rowing ===
Does not include all-sports independent teams that sponsor the sport, since they have been listed before.

Institution	Location	Nickname	Primary conference
Assumption University	Worcester, Massachusetts	Greyhounds	Northeast-10
University of Charleston	Charleston, West Virginia	Golden Eagles	MEC
Franklin Pierce University	Rindge, New Hampshire	Ravens	Northeast-10
Thomas Jefferson University (Jefferson)	Philadelphia, Pennsylvania	Rams	CACC

=== Swimming & diving ===
Does not include all-sports independent teams that sponsor the sport, since they have been listed before.

Institution	Location	Nickname	Primary conference	(M)	(W)
Roberts Wesleyan University	North Chili, New York	Redhawks	ECC	✓	✓

=== Tennis ===
Does not include all-sports independent teams that sponsor the sport (all of them in men's & women's tennis), since they have been listed before.

Institution	Location	Nickname	Primary conference	(M)	(W)
Bluefield State University	Bluefield, West Virginia	Big Blue	CIAA	✓	
Johnson C. Smith University	Charlotte, North Carolina	Golden Bulls	CIAA	✓	
Shaw University	Raleigh, North Carolina	Bears	CIAA	✓	
Virginia State University	Petersburg, Virginia	Trojans	CIAA	✓	

== Sports not sponsored by D-II ==
Institution	Location	Nickname	Primary conference	Sport
Bluefield State University	Bluefield, West Virginia	Big Blue	CIAA	Acrobatics & tumbling
Bridgeport University	Bridgeport, Connecticut	Purple Knights	CACC	Women's wrestling
California State University, Los Angeles	Los Angeles, California	Golden Eagles	CCAA	Beach volleyball
Chaminade University of Honolulu	Honolulu, Hawaii	Silverswords	PacWest	Beach volleyball
Coker University	Hartsville, South Carolina	Cobras	SAC	Men's volleyball
Colorado Mesa University	Grand Junction, Colorado	Mavericks	RMAC	Beach volleyball
Concordia University–Irvine	Irvine, California	Eagles	PacWest	Beach volleyball
D'Youville University	Buffalo, New York	Saints	ECC	Women's wrestling
East Stroudsburg University	East Stroudsburg, Pennsylvania	Warriors	PSAC	Women's wrestling
Pennsylvania Western University–Edinboro (Edinboro)	Edinboro, Pennsylvania	Fighting Scots	PSAC	Women's wrestling
Felician University	Rutherford, New Jersey	Golden Falcons	CACC	Women's wrestling
Fort Hays State University	Hays, Kansas	Tigers	MIAA	Women's wrestling
Frostburg State University	Frostburg, Maryland	Bobcats	MEC	Women's wrestling
Gannon University	Erie, Pennsylvania	Golden Knights	PSAC	Women's wrestling
Hawaii Pacific University	Honolulu, Hawaii	Sharks	PacWest	Beach volleyball
University of Jamestown	Jamestown, North Dakota	Jimmies	NSIC	Women's wrestling
Lincoln Memorial University	Harrogate, Tennessee	Railsplitters	SAC	Men's volleyball
Commonwealth University-Lock Haven (Lock Haven)	Lock Haven, Pennsylvania	Bald Eagles	PSAC	Women's wrestling
McKendree University	Lebanon, Illinois	Bearcats	GLVC	Beach volleyball
Minot State University	Minot, North Dakota	Beavers	NSIC	Women's wrestling
University of Pittsburgh at Johnstown (Pitt–Johnstown)	Johnstown, Pennsylvania	Mountain Cats	PSAC	Women's wrestling
Point Park University	Pittsburgh, Pennsylvania	Pioneers	MEC	Women's wrestling
University of Sioux Falls	Sioux Falls, South Dakota	Cougars	NSIC	Women's wrestling
Southwest Baptist University	Bolivar, Missouri	Bearcats	GLVC	Beach volleyball
Spring Hill College	Mobile, Alabama	Badgers	SIAC	Beach volleyball
Texas A&M University–Kingsville	Kingsville, Texas	Javelinas	LSC	Beach volleyball
Tiffin University	Tiffin, Ohio	Dragons	G-MAC	Women's wrestling
Tusculum University	Tusculum, Tennessee	Pioneers	SAC	Men's volleyball
Vanguard University	Costa Mesa, California	Lions	PacWest	Beach volleyball
Wayne State College	Wayne, Nebraska	Wildcats	NSIC	Beach volleyball
West Liberty University	West Liberty, West Virginia	Hilltoppers	MEC	Women's wrestling

== See also ==
- NCAA Division I independent schools
- NCAA Division III independent schools
- NAIA independent schools
- NCAA independent schools (lacrosse)
