= Chestnut Hill College =

Catholic college in Philadelphia, Pennsylvania, US

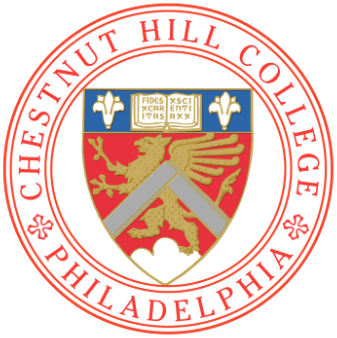
- Former names: Mount Saint Joseph College (1924-1938)
- Motto: Fides, Caritas, Scientia
- Motto in English: Faith, Charity, Knowledge
- Type: Private college
- Established: 1924; 102 years ago
- Religious affiliation: Catholic (Sisters of St. Joseph)
- Academic affiliations: ACCU; NAICU; CIC
- Undergraduates: 1072
- Postgraduates: 433
- Location: Philadelphia, Pennsylvania, U.S. 40.0871°N 75.2278°W
- Campus: Suburban
- Colors: Red
- Nickname: Griffins
- Sporting affiliations: NCAA Division II – CACC, ECC
- Mascot: Griffin
- Website: chc.edu
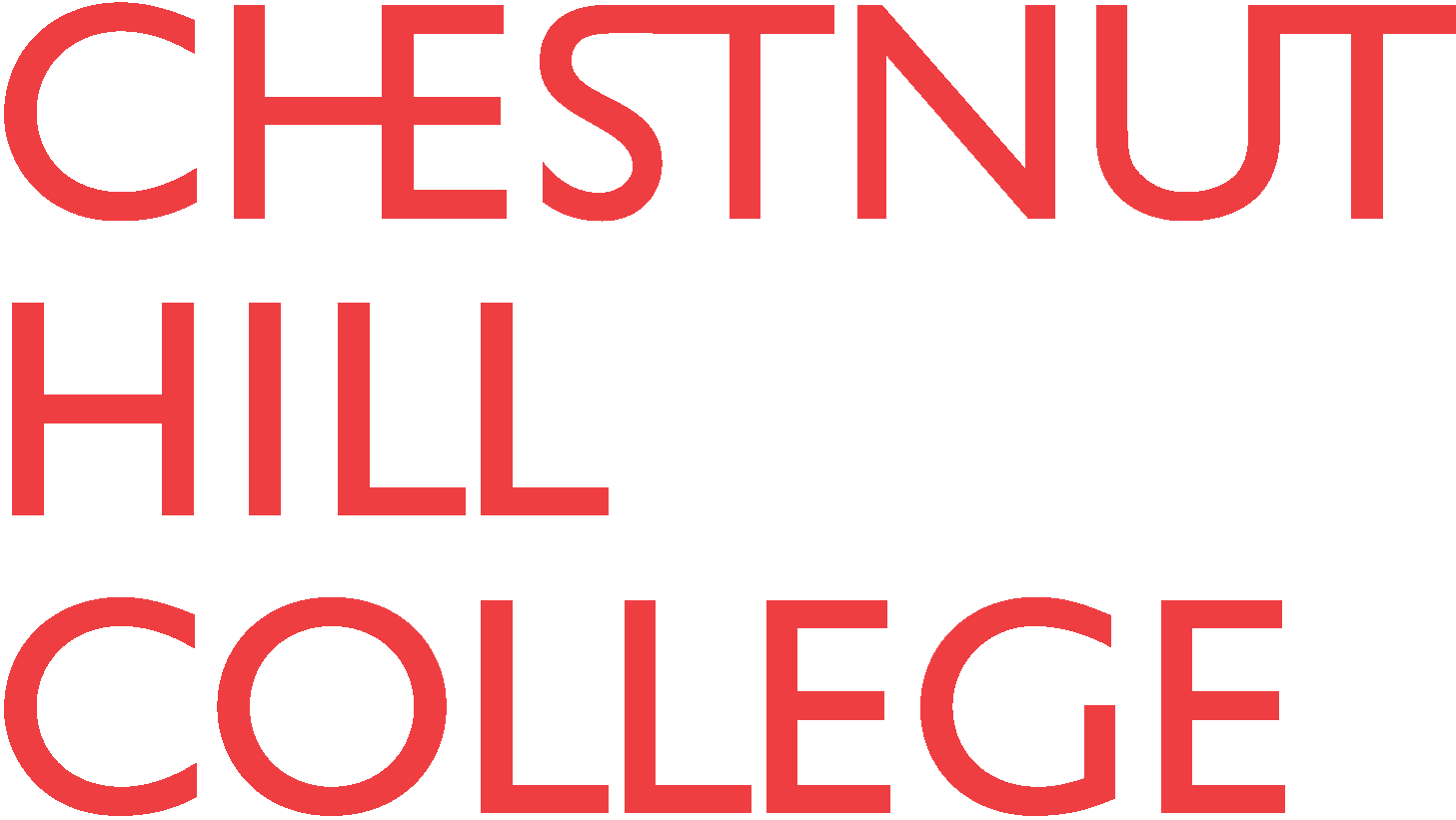

Chestnut Hill College is a private Catholic college in the Chestnut Hill section of Philadelphia, Pennsylvania, United States. The college was founded in 1924 as a women's college by the Sisters of St. Joseph. It was originally named Mount Saint Joseph College.

In 1980, the college established a coeducational graduate education program and started to admit male students to its undergraduate programs in 2003. As of 2012, a total of 2,318 students were enrolled in Chestnut Hill College's three constituent schools, with fewer than 900 as undergraduates.

== History ==
=== 20th century ===
Located at the northwestern edge of Philadelphia, on 45 acres (180,000 m^{2}), overlooking the Wissahickon Creek, Chestnut Hill College opened in 1924 as a Catholic, four-year, liberal arts college for women. Founded as Mount Saint Joseph College by the Sisters of St. Joseph, the college was renamed in 1938 as Chestnut Hill College. In the 1960s, the high school section moved to Flourtown, about 1 mile (1.6 km) away, and retains the original name Mount Saint Joseph.

Throughout its history, the college has aimed to offer a liberal arts education that provides students with a broad background in the humanities, social sciences and natural sciences, to prepare students for life's challenges by helping them to grow intellectually, spiritually, emotionally, and socially.

The curriculum has been modified over time. The college originally awarded only the Bachelor of Arts and Bachelor of Science degrees to young women of traditional college age. In 1972, a continuing education department, now called the School of Continuing Studies, was established to extend opportunities for undergraduate study to mature women and men. Many classes are conducted on evenings and weekends to accommodate the schedules of older students. The coeducational school of graduate studies was established in 1980 to offer master's degrees; in 1997, it added a doctoral program.

Academic changes also included expanding beyond the physical limits of the campus. As a member of the Southeastern Pennsylvania Consortium for Higher Education (SEPCHE), Chestnut Hill pursues a collaborative approach to higher education with seven other local institutions. Through membership in the Association of Colleges of Sisters of St. Joseph (ACSSJ), Chestnut Hill offers its students opportunities to enrich their educational experiences by studying at seven other colleges in the United States. Study-abroad programs also are available.

=== 21st century ===
In November 2001, Chestnut Hill College announced plans to admit men to the traditional-age, full-time undergraduate program in fall 2003. With the enrollment of male students, the 78-year-old College for Women became the School of Undergraduate Studies.

Enrollment increased dramatically after the undergraduate college became coeducational, increasing 80% by fall 2005, and total enrollment numbered well over 2,000 in the 2010s.

== Campus ==
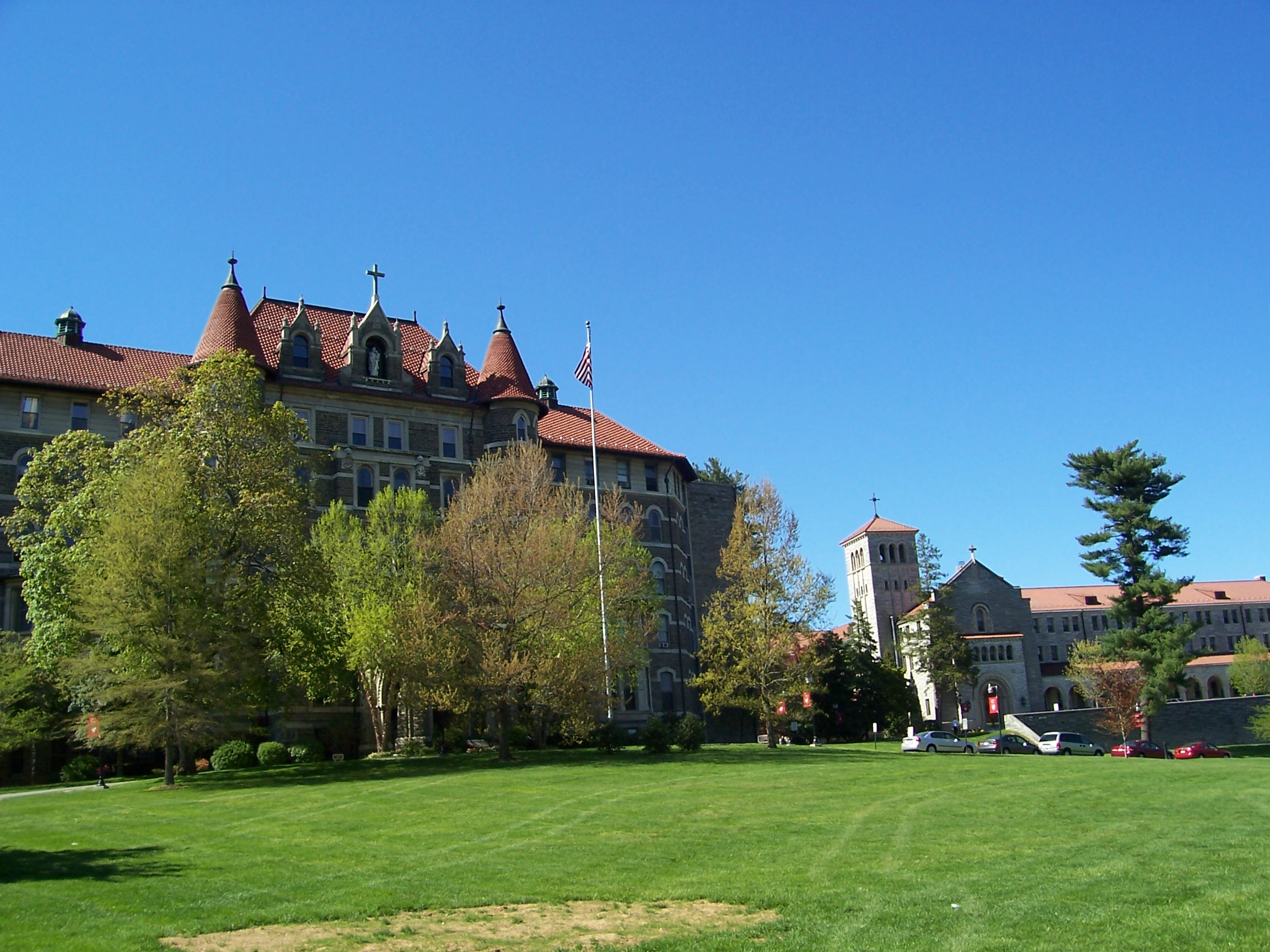
The campus of Chestnut Hill College in Philadelphia

The Chestnut Hill campus is listed on the National Register of Historic Places. For many years the main buildings were St. Joseph Hall, with a six-story Greco-Roman rotunda and French Gothic exterior, Fournier Hall, a jewel of Italian Romanesque architecture, and Clement Hall, which houses classrooms and modest athletic facilities, including a swimming pool. The campus grounds include a grotto and fountain, the House of Loretto, and an elegant main chapel that was inspired by Sainte-Chapelle in Paris. Logue Library, Fontbonne Hall, Barbara D'Iorio Martino Hall and, most recently, a new residence hall called Fitzsimmons Hall are relatively new additions to accommodate the college's growth. New structures were designed to preserve the architectural integrity of the campus while addressing specific educational or student life needs.

In recent years, the science facilities and computer laboratories have been renovated to help create a 21st-century teaching and learning environment. Martino Hall includes "smart" classrooms and seminar rooms that are part of the campus-wide interactive network.

In 2006, Chestnut Hill announced the acquisition (from the Albert M. Greenfield Foundation for $11 million) of the Sugarloaf Estate, a 30-acre (120,000 m^{2}) non-contiguous property across Germantown Avenue and Wissahickon Creek from the existing campus. It was previously used as The Albert M. Greenfield Conference Center of Temple University as well as the headquarters of the Greenfield Foundation, and from 1952 to 1967, as the residence of the Foundation's namesake, local realty magnate Albert M. Greenfield. The additional property was used to accommodate additional campus expansion, including a residence hall. In addition, the 1929 Steel-Greenfield mansion was restored to its original appearance and renovated for classroom, conference and meeting use, and is now known as Commonwealth Chateau.

== Alumni ==
More than 10,000 individuals have earned degrees from Chestnut Hill College since 1924. One alumna, Kathleen Byerly, was among the women featured in Time magazine when the American Woman was selected Time's Person of the Year for 1975. Frances Spence, one of the original ENIAC programmers, graduated from Chestnut Hill College in 1942. Writer of The Cat I Never Named Dr. Amra Sabic-el-Rayess went to Chestnut Hill for one semester after escaping genocide in Bosnia. Pennsylvania State Senator from the 17th district Amanda Cappelletti is a 2010 graduate.

== Academics ==
The college offers certificates, Bachelor of Arts, Bachelor of Science, and Bachelor of Science in Nursing degrees. It also offers a combined BS in Human Services Leadership and Policy Studies/MS in Human Services Management, in addition to other graduate programs in professional fields as well as the Doctor in Clinical Psychology degree (Psy.D.).

== Athletics ==
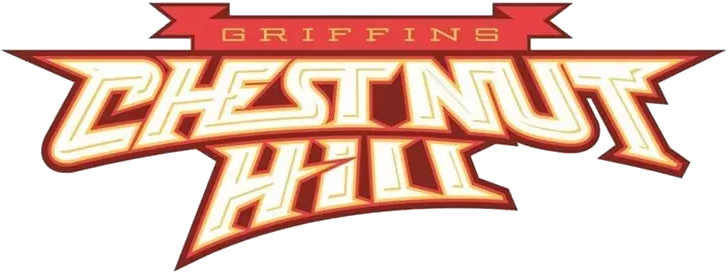
Chestnut Hill Griffins wordmark

Chestnut Hill College's sports teams are known as the Griffins. Chestnut Hill College is an NCAA Division II institution that competes in the Central Atlantic Collegiate Conference (CACC). Previously, Chestnut Hill was a charter member of the North Eastern Athletic Conference of NCAA Division III from 2004–2005 to 2006–2007. The college sponsors twenty varsity intercollegiate sports teams, with baseball, basketball, cross country, golf, lacrosse, soccer, sprint football, tennis, and track and field for men, and basketball, bowling, cross country, flag football, golf, lacrosse, soccer, softball, tennis, track and field, and volleyball for women.

Chestnut Hill College also has a Quidditch team. The Chestnut Hill College Griffins placed third at the 2008 Intercollegiate Quidditch Association World Cup and earned first place at the 2014 Brotherly Love Cup. They host an annual Harry Potter Festival in mid- to late October.
