= Caldwell University =

Catholic university in Caldwell, New Jersey, U.S.

- Latin: Sigilum Universitatis Caldwellensis
- Former names: Caldwell College for Women (1939–1986); Caldwell College (1986–2014)
- Motto: Sapientia et Scientia
- Motto in English: Wisdom and Knowledge
- Type: Private university
- Established: August 10, 1939
- Religious affiliation: Roman Catholic (Dominican)
- Academic affiliations: CIC; ACCU
- President: Jeffrey D. Senese, Ph.D
- Students: 2,005 (fall 2024)
- Undergraduates: 1,617 (fall 2024)
- Postgraduates: 388 (fall 2024)
- Location: Caldwell, New Jersey, U.S. 40.834°N 74.273°W
- Campus: 70 acres (28 ha); Suburban
- Colors: Red and gold
- Nickname: Cougars
- Sporting affiliations: NCAA Division II – CACC; ECAC; NEC
- Mascot: Cooper the Cougar
- Website: caldwell.edu

Caldwell University is a private Catholic university in Caldwell, New Jersey, United States. Founded in 1939 by the Sisters of St. Dominic, the university is accredited by the Middle States Commission on Higher Education, chartered by the State of New Jersey, and registered with the Regents of the University of the State of New York. Caldwell offers 25 undergraduate and 30 graduate programs, including doctoral, master's, certificate, and certification programs, as well as online and distance learning options.

== History ==
In 2013, Caldwell College received approval for university status and changed its name to Caldwell University on July 1, 2014. In 2020 Caldwell University was designated by the U.S. Department of Education as a Hispanic-Serving Institution (HSI).

== Campus ==
The university is located in suburban New Jersey, and it is about 20 miles from Manhattan. It is on a seventy-acre campus along Essex County Route 506 (Bloomfield Avenue) and shares the land with the Sisters of St. Dominic's Caldwell convent and Mount Saint Dominic Academy, an all-girls Catholic high school. The Sisters also operate Saint Dominic Academy in nearby Jersey City and Lacordaire Academy in Upper Montclair.

== Athletics ==
The Department of Athletics oversees all athletic programs at the university. Caldwell University teams participate as a member of the National Collegiate Athletic Association's Division II. The Cougars are a member of the Central Atlantic Collegiate Conference (CACC).

In fall of 2019, Caldwell University launched an eSports program as a member of the ECAC. The inaugural team will compete in the games of Overwatch and League of Legends. At the same time, Caldwell University will also launch a B.S. in e-Sports Management.

Men's sports	Women's sports
Baseball	Acrobatics and tumbling
Basketball	Basketball
Cross country	Bowling
Lacrosse	Cross country
Soccer	Lacrosse
Sprint football	Soccer
Track and field	Softball
	Track and field
	Volleyball
Co-ed sports
e-sports

== Notable alumni ==
Alumni of Caldwell University include:

- Bill Brennan, activist and politician.
- Jane Burgio (1922–2005), politician who served as Secretary of State of New Jersey and as a member of the New Jersey General Assembly.
- Mary Jo Codey (born 1955), wife of former Governor Richard Codey.
- Beth Fowler (born 1940), actress.
- Arline Friscia, politician who served as a member of the New Jersey General Assembly from 1996 to 2002, where she represented the 19th Legislative District.
- Mary Jo Kopechne (1940–1969), who drowned while riding as a passenger in a car driven by U.S. Senator Edward M. Kennedy.
