= Cris Reisert =

American football coach (born c. 1986)

Current position
- Title: Offensive coordinator
- Team: Toledo
- Conference: MAC

Biographical details
- Born: c. 1986 (age 39–40); Cincinnati, Ohio, U.S.
- Education: Ohio Dominican University (2009, 2011)

Playing career
- 2005–2008: Ohio Dominican
- Position: Quarterback

Coaching career (HC unless noted)
- 2009: Ohio Dominican (GA)
- 2010: Ohio Dominican (QB)
- 2011–2012: Ohio Dominican (WR)
- 2013: Ball State (GA)
- 2014–2016: Elon (TE)
- 2017–2018: Ohio Dominican (OC)
- 2019–2023: Tiffin
- 2024–2025: Gardner–Webb
- 2026–present: Toledo (OC/QB)

Head coaching record
- Overall: 51–24
- Bowls: 2–1
- Tournaments: 0–2 (NCAA D-II playoffs)

Accomplishments and honors

Championships
- 3 G-MAC (2019–2020, 2023)

Awards
- 3× First Team All-MSFA (2006–2008); 2× AFCA All-American (2007–2008); MSFA Offensive Player of the Year (2008)

Cris Reisert (born c. 1986) is an American college football coach. He is the offensive coordinator at the University of Toledo. Previously, he was the head football coach of Gardner–Webb University, a position he held from 2024 through 2025. He was the head football coach for Tiffin University from 2019 through 2023. He also coached for Ohio Dominican, Ball State, and Elon. He played college football for Ohio Dominican as a quarterback.

== Head coaching record ==
Year	Team	Overall	Conference	Standing	Bowl/playoffs	AFCA^{#}	D2^{°}
Tiffin Dragons (Great Midwest Athletic Conference) (2019–2023)
2019	Tiffin	9–2	7–0	1st	L NCAA Division II First Round	23	
2020–21	Tiffin	6–0	5–0	1st			
2021	Tiffin	8–3	5–2	T–2nd			
2022	Tiffin	6–5	6–2	T–2nd	L America's Crossroads		
2023	Tiffin	11–1	9–0	1st	L NCAA Division II Second Round	14	19
Tiffin:		40–11	32–4				
Gardner–Webb Runnin' Bulldogs (Big South–OVC Football Association) (2024–2025)
2024	Gardner–Webb	4–8	3–5	T–6th			
2025	Gardner–Webb	7–5	5–3	T–3rd			
Gardner–Webb:		11–13	8–8				
Total:		51–24					
National championship Conference title Conference division title or championship game berth
^{†}Indicates Bowl Coalition, Bowl Alliance, BCS, or CFP / New Years' Six bowl.
