= Kelly Cummings =

American football coach (born c. 1970–1971)

Current position
- Title: Head coach
- Team: Ohio Dominican
- Conference: G-MAC
- Record: 61–40

Biographical details
- Born: c. 1970 or 1971 (age 55–56); Knoxville, Tennessee, U.S.
- Education: Eastern Kentucky University (1993)

Playing career
- 1989–1990: Northeastern Oklahoma A&M
- 1991–1992: Eastern Kentucky
- Position: Linebacker

Coaching career (HC unless noted)
- 1994–1995: Madison Central HS (KY) (assistant)
- 1996: Denison (LB)
- 1997–1999: Denison (DC)
- 2000–2005: Wittenberg (LB)
- 2006–2009: Findlay (DC)
- 2011–2012: Toledo (ST/DE/LB)
- 2013–2015: Ohio Dominican (DC)
- 2016–present: Ohio Dominican

Head coaching record
- Overall: 61–40
- Bowls: 0–1

Accomplishments and honors

Championships
- 1 G-MAC (2017)

Kelly Cummings (born c. 1970 or 1971) is an American college football coach. He is the head football coach for Ohio Dominican University, a position he has held since 2016. He also coached for Madison Central High School, Denison, Wittenberg, Findlay, and Toledo. He played college football for Northeastern Oklahoma A&M and Eastern Kentucky as a linebacker.

== Head coaching record ==
Year	Team	Overall	Conference	Standing	Bowl/playoffs
Ohio Dominican Panthers (Great Lakes Intercollegiate Athletic Conference) (2016)
2016	Ohio Dominican	7–4	7–4	T–5th	
Ohio Dominican Panthers (Great Midwest Athletic Conference) (2017–present)
2017	Ohio Dominican	7–3	7–0	1st	
2018	Ohio Dominican	9–2	6–2	T–2nd	
2019	Ohio Dominican	7–3	6–1	2nd	L America's Crossroads
2020–21	Ohio Dominican	4–2	4–2	T–2nd	
2021	Ohio Dominican	7–4	4–3	T–4th	
2022	Ohio Dominican	7–3	6–2	T–2nd	
2023	Ohio Dominican	4–7	3–6	T–7th	
2024	Ohio Dominican	4–7	3–6	8th	
2025	Ohio Dominican	5–5	4–5	T–6th	
Ohio Dominican:		61–40	50–31		
Total:		61–40			
National championship Conference title Conference division title or championship game berth
