= 2022 Great Midwest Athletic Conference football season =

- Sport: Football
- Teams: 9
- Champion: Ashland

Football seasons
- 2021 2023

2022 Great Midwest Athletic Conference football standings
	Conf.			Overall
Team	W		L	W		L
No. 13 Ashland $^	7	–	1	10	–	2
Ohio Dominican	6	–	2	7	–	3
Findlay	6	–	2	7	–	4
Tiffin #	6	–	2	6	–	5
Hillsdale	4	–	4	5	–	6
Lake Erie	3	–	5	3	–	8
Northwood	2	–	6	3	–	8
Kentucky Wesleyan	1	–	7	2	–	9
Walsh	1	–	7	1	–	9
$ – Conference champion; ^ – NCAA Division II playoff participant; # – America's Crossroads Bowl participant; Rankings from AFCA poll

The 2022 Great Midwest Athletic Conference football season was the season of college football played by the nine member schools of the Great Midwest Athletic Conference (GMAC) as part of the 2022 NCAA Division II football season.

Ashland compiled a 10–2 record, won the GMAC championship, and was ranked No. 12 in the final NCAA Division II poll. Ashland advanced to the Division II playoffs, losing to IUP in the second round.

Ashland linebacker Michael Ayers was selected as the GMAC Player of the Year. Lee Owens of Ashland was named Coach of the Year, and Hillsdale wide receiver Isaac TeSlaa was named Defensive Player of the Year.

== Conference awards ==
=== Individual awards ===
- Player of the Year - Michael Ayers, linebacker, Ashland
- Offensive Player of the Year - Isaac TeSlaa, wide receiver, Hillsdale
- Defensive Player of the Year - Jaylin Garner, defensive line, Ohio Dominican
- Offensive Lineman of the Year - Ty Keirns, Ohio Dominican
- Defensive Lineman of the Year - Charlie Cleveland, Tiffin
- Freshman of the Year - Ethan Enders, offensive line, Ashland
- Special Teams Player of the Year - Anthony Lowe, return specialist, Tiffin
- Elite 26 Award - Jordan Speller, offensive line, Tiffin
- Coach of the Year - Lee Owens, Ashland

=== All-conference team ===
Offense first team

- Quarterback - Austin Brenner, Ashland
- Running backs - Michael Herzog, Hillsdale; Larry Martin, Ashland; Darius Pinnix, Tiffin
- Offensive line - Shane Bumgardner, Tiffin; Nehemiah Cannon, Ashland; Michael Jerrell, Findlay; Ty Keirns, Ohio Dominican; Gavin Posey, Ashland; Sam Puthoff, Ashland
- Wide receivers - Peyton Brown, Lake Erie; Anthony Lowe, Tiffin; Isaac Teslaa, Hillsdale; Andrew Wolf, Ohio Dominican
- Tight end - Mike Rigerman, Findlay

Defense first team

- Defensive line - Jeffrey Barnett, Ashland; Grey Brancifort, Findlay; Jaylin Garner, Ohio Dominican; Charlie Cleveland, Tiffin; Eddie Miller-Garrett, Ohio Dominican
- Linebackers - Michael Ayers, Ashland; Stephen Baugh, Walsh; AJ Crider, Ohio Dominican; Jalen Humphrey, Kentucky Wesleyan; Kyle Kudla, Hillsdale
- Defensive backs - Kijana Caldwell, Findlay; Daishaun Hill, Ohio Dominican; Jayden Hill, Ohio Dominican; Devin Prude, Ashland; Jourdan Swett, Ashland

Special teams first team

- Punter - Luke Keller, Hillsdale
- Kicker - Austin Snyder, Findlay
- Return specialist - Anthony Lowe, Tiffin

== Teams ==
=== Ashland ===
2022 Ashland Eagles football

GMAC champion

NCAA Division II Second Round, L 13–19 at IUP
- Conference: Great Midwest Athletic Conference

Ranking
- AFCA: No. 12
- Record: 10–2 (7–1 GMAC)
- Head coach: Lee Owens (17th season)
- Offensive coordinator: Tom Stacy (12th season)
- Defensive coordinator: Tim Rose (14th season)
- Home stadium: Jack Miller Field/Schar Athletic Complex

The 2022 Ashland Eagles football team represented the Ashland University as a member of the Great Midwest Athletic Conference (GMAC) during the 2022 NCAA Division II football season. In their 17th season under head coach Lee Owens, the Eagles compiled a 10–2 record (7–1 against conference opponents), won the GMAC championship, and were ranked No. 12 nationally at the end of the regular season.

Date	Opponent	Rank	Site	Result	Attendance	Source
September 1	No. 10 Notre Dame (OH)*		Jack Miller Field/Schar Athletic Complex; Ashland, OH	W 31–14	3,623	
September 10	at Findlay	No. 20	Donnell Stadium; Findlay, OH	W 28–3	4,527	
September 24	at Quincy*		QU Stadium; Quincy, IL	W 34–14	500	
October 1	Northwood		Jack Miller Field/Schar Athletic Complex; Ashland, OH	W 56–17	2,077	
October 8	at Walsh		Larry Staudt Field; North Canton, OH	W 35–0	1,143	
October 15	Ohio Dominican		Jack Miller Field/Schar Athletic Complex; Ashland, OH	W 14–7	3,072	
October 22	at Tiffin^{†}		Jack Miller Field/Schar Athletic Complex; Tiffin, OH	W 28–20	3,390	
October 29	at Hillsdale		Frank "Muddy" Waters Stadium; Hillsdale, MI	L 20–36	1,835	
November 5	at Lake Erie		Jack Britt Memorial Stadium; Painesville, OH	W 31–23	507	
November 12	Kentucky Wesleyan	No. 13	Jack Miller Field/Schar Athletic Complex; Ashland, OH	W 41–10	1,601	
November 19	No. 24 Notre Dame (OH)*		Jack Miller Field/Schar Athletic Complex; Ashland, OH (NCAA Division II First Round)	W 20–13	1,825	
November 26	at No. 15 IUP*		George P. Miller Stadium; Indiana, PA (NCAA Division II Second Round)	L 13–19	1,295	
*Non-conference game; ^{†}Homecoming; Rankings from Coaches' Poll released prior to the game

=== Ohio Dominican ===
2022 Ohio Dominican Panthers football
- Conference: Great Midwest Athletic Conference
- Record: 7–3 (6–2 GMAC)
- Head coach: Kelly Cummings (7th season)
- Offensive coordinator: Tanner McCormick (1st season)
- Defensive coordinator: Trent Voss (2nd season)
- Home stadium: Panther Stadium

The 2022 Ohio Dominican Panthers football team represented the Ohio Dominican University as a member of the Great Midwest Athletic Conference (GMAC) during the 2022 NCAA Division II football season. In their sixth year under head coach Kelly Cummings, the Panthers compiled a 7–3 record (6–2 against conference opponents) and tied for second place in the GMAC.

Date	Opponent	Site	Result	Attendance	Source
September 3	Findlay	Panther Stadium; Columbus, OH	W 28–14	1,280	
September 10	at Tiffin	Frost-Kalnow Stadium; Tiffin, OH	L 13–28	2,140	
September 17	William Jewell*	Panther Stadium; Columbus, OH	W 31–21	1,159	
September 24	No. 16/24 Indianapolis*	Panther Stadium; Columbus, OH	L 38–44	2,154	
October 1	Walsh^{†}	Panther Stadium; Columbus, OH	W 21–0	1,298	
October 8	at Lake Erie	Jack Britt Memorial Stadium; Painesville, OH	W 38–7	314	
October 15	at No. 6/11 Ashland	Jack Miller Stadium; Ashland, OH	L 7–14	3,072	
October 22	Kentucky Wesleyan	Panther Stadium; Columbus, OH	W 49–7	1,051	
November 5	at Northwood	Hantz Stadium; Midland, MI	W 35–24	1,194	
November 12	Hillsdale	Panther Stadium; Columbus, OH	W 20–10	1,267	
*Non-conference game; ^{†}Homecoming; Rankings from Coaches' Poll released prior to the game

=== Findlay ===
2022 Findlay Oilers football
- Conference: Great Midwest Athletic Conference
- Record: 7–4 (6–2 GMAC)
- Head coach: Kory Allen (1st season)
- Offensive coordinator: Kyle Ohradzandsky (1st season)
- Defensive coordinator: Thomas Rebholz (2nd season)
- Home stadium: Donnell Stadium

The 2022 Findlay Oilers football team represented the University of Findlay as a member of the Great Midwest Athletic Conference (GMAC) during the 2022 NCAA Division II football season. In their first season under head coach Kory Allen, the Oilers compiled a 7–4 record (6–2 against conference opponents) and tied for second place in the GMAC.

Date	Opponent	Site	Result	Attendance	Source
September 3	at Ohio Dominican	Panther Stadium; Columbus, OH	L 14–28	1,280	
September 10	No. 20 Ashland	Donnell Stadium; Findlay, OH	L 3–28	4,527	
September 17	Southwest Baptist*	Donnell Stadium; Findlay, OH	W 52–35	727	
September 24	at North Greenville*	Younts Stadium; Tigerville, SC	L 27–34	2,374	
October 1	No. 1 Ferris State*	Donnell Stadium; Findlay, OH	L 7–38	728	
October 8	Northwood^{†}	Donnell Stadium; Findlay, OH	W 34–14	2,967	
October 15	at Kentucky Wesleyan	Steele Stadium; Owensboro, KY	W 44–7	600	
October 22	at Hillsdale	Frank "Muddy" Waters Stadium; Hillsdale, MI	W 41–20	2,057	
October 29	Lake Erie	Donnell Stadium; Findlay, OH	W 42–17	629	
November 5	Walsh	Donnell Stadium; Findlay, OH	W 20–7	527	
November 12	at Tiffin	Frost-Kalnow Stadium; Tiffin, OH	W 27–25		
*Non-conference game; ^{†}Homecoming; Rankings from Coaches' Poll released prior to the game

=== Tiffin ===
2022 Tiffin Dragons football
- Conference: Great Midwest Athletic Conference
- Record: 6–5 (6–2 GMAC)
- Head coach: Cris Reisert (4th season)
- Offensive coordinator: Tyler Johns (4th season)
- Home stadium: Frost Kalnow Stadium

The 2022 Tiffin Dragons football team represented the Tiffin University as a member of the Great Midwest Athletic Conference (GMAC) during the 2022 NCAA Division II football season. In their fourth season under head coach Cris Reisert, the Dragons compiled a 6–5 record (6–2 against conference opponents) and tied for second place in the GMAC.

Date	Opponent	Site	Result	Attendance	Source
September 3	at Walsh	Larry Staudt Field; North Canton, OH	W 42–0		
September 10	Ohio Dominican	Frost Kalnow Stadium; Tiffin, OH	W 28–13	2,140	
September 17	Indianapolis*	Frost Kalnow Stadium; Tiffin, OH	L 20–27	2,650	
September 24	at Truman State*	Stokes Stadium; Kirksville, MO	L 17–18 ^{OT}	3,400	
October 1	Lake Erie^{†}	Frost Kalnow Stadium; Tifin, OH	W 52–27	2,736	
October 8	at Hillsdale	Frank "Muddy" Waters Stadium; Hillsdale, MI	W 41–0	2,817	
October 22	at Ashland	Jack Miller Field/Schar Athletic Complex; Ashland, OH	L 20–28	3,390	
October 29	Northwood	Frost Kalnow Stadium; Tiffin, OH	W 48–3	1,127	
November 5	at Kentucky Wesleyan	Steele Stadium; Owensboro, KY	W 72–13	630	
November 12	Findlay	Frost Kalnow Stadium; Tiffin, OH	L 25–27		
December 3	vs. Truman State*	Brickyard Stadium; Hobart, IN (Crossroads Bowl)	L 27–28	808	
*Non-conference game; ^{†}Homecoming

=== Hillsdale ===
2022 Hillsdale Chargers football
- Conference: Great Midwest Athletic Conference
- Record: 5–6 (4–4 GMAC)
- Head coach: Keith Otterbein (21st season)
- Offensive coordinator: Nate Shreffler (12th season)
- Defensive coordinator: Steve Otterbein (1st season)
- Home stadium: Frank "Muddy" Waters Stadium

The 2022 Hillsdale Chargers football team represented Hillsdale College as a member of the Great Midwest Athletic Conference (GMAC) during the 2022 NCAA Division II football season. In their 21st season under head coach Keith Otterbein, the Chargers compiled a 5–6 record (4–4 against conference opponents) and finished fifth in the GMAC.

Date	Opponent	Site	Result	Attendance	Source
September 3	at Lake Erie	Jack Britt Memorial Stadium; Painesville, OH	W 35–31	653	
September 10	Walsh	Frank "Muddy" Waters Stadium; Hillsdale, MI	W 35–17	2,145	
September 17	Truman State*	Frank "Muddy" Waters Stadium; Hillsdale, MI	L 13–21	1,724	
September 24	at Missouri S&T*	Allgood-Bailey Stadium; Rolla, MO	W 17–10	2,909	
October 1	at Kentucky Wesleyan	Steele Stadium; Owensboro, KY	L 27–31	1,550	
October 8	Tiffin^{†}	Frank "Muddy" Waters Stadium; Hillsdale, MI	L 0–41	2,817	
October 15	at Northwood	Hantz Stadium; Midland, MI	W 41–7	1,121	
October 22	Findlay	Frank "Muddy" Waters Stadium; Hillsdale, MI	L 20–41	2,057	
October 29	Ashland	Frank "Muddy" Waters Stadium; Hillsdale, MI	W 36–20	1,835	
November 5	Michigan Tech*	Frank Waters Stadium; Hillsdale, MI	L 24–28	1,407	
November 12	at Ohio Dominican	Panther Stadium; Columbus, OH	L 10–20	1,267	
*Non-conference game; ^{†}Homecoming

=== Lake Erie ===
2022 Lake Erie Storm football
- Conference: Great Midwest Athletic Conference
- Record: 3–8 (3–5 GMAC)
- Head coach: DJ Boldin (1st season)
- Offensive coordinator: Joseph Kreinsen (2nd season)
- Home stadium: Jack Britt Memorial Stadium

The 2022 Lake Erie Storm football team represented Lake Erie College as a member of the Great Midwest Athletic Conference (GMAC) during the 2022 NCAA Division II football season. In their second season under head coach D. J. Boldin, the Storm compiled a 3–8 record (3–5 against conference opponents) and finished sixth in the GMAC.

Date	Opponent	Site	Result	Attendance	Source
September 3	Hillsdale	Jack Britt Memorial Stadium; Painesville, OH	L 31–35	653	
September 10	at Kentucky Wesleyan	Steele Stadium; Owensboro, KY	W 26–21	1,450	
September 17	McKendree*^{†}	Jack Britt Memorial Stadium; Painesville, OH	L 37–38	494	
September 24	at Southwest Baptist*	Plaster Stadium; Bolivar, MO	L 31–52	625	
October 1	at Tiffin	Frost Kalnow Stadium; Tiffin, OH	L 27–52	2,736	
October 8	Ohio Dominican	Jack Britt Memorial Stadium; Painesville, OH	L 7–38	315	
October 15	at Walsh	Larry Staudt Field; North Canton, OH	W 22–15 ^{OT}	500	
October 22	Northwood	Jack Britt Memorial Stadium; Painesville, OH	W 21–18	433	
October 29	at Findlay	Donnell Stadium; Findlay, OH	L 17–42	629	
November 5	Ashland	Jack Britt Memorial Stadium; Painesville, OH	L 23–31	507	
November 12	Northern Michigan*	Jack Britt Memorial Stadium; Painesville, OH	L 11–33	331	
*Non-conference game; ^{†}Homecoming

=== Northwood ===
2022 Northwood Timberwolves football
- Conference: Great Midwest Athletic Conference
- Record: 3–8 (2–6 GMAC)
- Head coach: Leonard Haynes (7th season)
- Home stadium: Hantz Stadium

The 2022 Northwood Timberwolves football team represented Northwood University as a member of the Great Midwest Athletic Conference (GMAC) during the 2022 NCAA Division II football season. In their seventh year under head coach Leonard Haynes, the Timberwolves compiled a 3–8 record (2–6 against conference opponents) and finished seventh in the GMAC.

Date	Opponent	Site	Result	Attendance	Source
September 3	Kentucky Wesleyan	Hantz Stadium; Midland, MI	W 55–13	1,833	
September 10	Madonna*	Hantz Stadium; Midland, MI	W 38–0	1,244	
September 17	Saginaw Valley State*^{†}	Hantz Stadium; Midland, MI	L 14–35	3,122	
September 24	at Davenport*	Farmers Insurance Complex; Caledonia, MI	L 17–51	1,822	
October 1	at Ashland	Jack Miller Field/Schar Athletic Complex; Ashland, OH	L 17–56		
October 8	at Findlay	Donnell Stadium; Findlay, OH	L 14–34	2,967	
October 15	Hillsdale	Hantz Stadium; Midland, MI	L 7–41	1,121	
October 22	at Lake Erie	Jack Britt Memorial Stadium; Painesville, OH	L 18–21	433	
October 29	at Tiffin	Frost Kalnow Stadium; Tiffin, OH	L 3–48	1,127	
November 5	Ohio Dominican	Hantz Stadium; Midland, MI	L 24–35	1,194	
November 12	Walsh	Hantz Stadium; Midland, MI	W 34–14	1,001	
*Non-conference game; ^{†}Homecoming

=== Kentucky Wesleyan ===
2022 Kentucky Wesleyan Panthers football
- Conference: Great Midwest Athletic Conference
- Record: 2–9 (1–8 GMAC)
- Head coach: Tyrone Young (1st season)
- Offensive coordinator: Alfonzo Browning (1st season)
- Defensive coordinator: Brandon Frase (1st season)
- Home stadium: Steele Stadium

The 2022 Kentucky Wesleyan Panthers football team represented Kentucky Wesleyan College as a member of the Great Midwest Athletic Conference (GMAC) during the 2022 NCAA Division II football season. In their first year under head coach Tyrone Young, the Panthers compiled a 2–9 record (1–8 against conference opponents) and tied for last place in the GMAC.

Date	Opponent	Site	Result	Attendance	Source
September 3	at Northwood	Hantz Stadium; Midland, MI	L 13–55	1,833	
September 10	Lake Erie	Steele Stadium; Owensboro, KY	L 21–26	1,450	
September 17	Missouri S&T*	Steele Stadium; Owensboro, KY	W 11–6	1,000	
September 24	at William Jewell*	Greene Stadium; Liberty, MO	L 17–24		
October 1	Hillsdale	Steele Stadium; Owensboro, KY	W 31–27	1,550	
October 8	at Quincy*	QU Stadium; Quincy, IL	L 9–46	432	
October 15	Findlay	Steele Stadium; Owensboro, KY	L 7–44	600	
October 22	at Ohio Dominican	Panther Stadium; Columbus, OH	L 7–49	1,051	
October 29	at Walsh	Larry Staudt Field; North Canton, OH	L 10–35	714	
November 5	Tiffin	Steele Stadium; Owensboro, KY	L 13–72	630	
November 12	at No. 13 Ashland	Jack Miller Field/Schar Athletic Complex; Ashland, OH	L 10–41	1,601	
*Non-conference game; Rankings from Coaches' Poll released prior to the game

=== Walsh ===
2022 Walsh Cavaliers football
- Conference: Great Midwest Athletic Conference
- Record: 1–9 (1–7 GMAC)
- Head coach: John Fankhauser (5th season)
- Offensive coordinator: Aaron Shreffler (3rd season)
- Defensive coordinator: Mark Johnston (2nd season)
- Home stadium: Staudt Field

The 2022 Walsh Cavaliers football team represented Walsh University as a member of the Great Midwest Athletic Conference (GMAC) during the 2022 NCAA Division II football season. In their second year under head coach John Frankhauser, the Cavaliers compiled a 1–9 record (1–7 against conference opponents) and tied for last place in the GMAC.

Date	Opponent	Site	Result	Attendance	Source
September 3	Tiffin	Staudt Field; North Canton, OH	L 0–42		
September 10	at Hillsdale	Frank "Muddy" Waters Stadium; Hillsdale, MI	L 17–35	2,145	
September 17	Quincy*^{†}	Staudt Field; North Canton, OH	L 13–28	711	
September 24	at McKendree*	Leemon Field; Lebanon, IL	L 10–46	3,200	
October 1	at Ohio Dominican	Panther Stadium; Columbus, OH	L 0–21	1,298	
October 8	Ashland	Staudt Field; North Canton, OH	L 0–35	1,143	
October 15	Lake Erie	Staudt Field; North Canton, OH	L 15–22 ^{OT}	500	
October 29	Kentucky Wesleyan	Staudt Field; North Canton, OH	W 35–10	714	
November 5	at Findlay	Donnell Stadium; Findlay, OH	L 7–20	527	
November 12	at Northwood	Hantz Stadium; Midland, MI	L 14–34	1,001	
*Non-conference game; ^{†}Homecoming
