= Brett Ekkens =

American football player and coach (born 1989)

Arizona Cardinals
- Title: Offensive quality control coach

Personal information
- Born: October 16, 1989 (age 37); Kentwood, Michigan, U.S.

Career information
- Position: Center
- College: University of Mount Union; University of Akron

Career history
- Mount Union (2012–2013) Offensive line coach; Akron (2014–2015) Graduate assistant; Akron (2016–2018) Offensive line coach; Indiana Wesleyan (2019–2021) Offensive line coach; Saginaw Valley State (2022–2023) Offensive coordinator & offensive line coach; Tiffin (2024–2025) Head coach; Arizona Cardinals (2026–present) Offensive quality control coach

Head coaching record
- Regular season: NCAA: 15–8 (.652)
- Postseason: NCAA: 0–1 (.000)

Brett Ekkens (born October 16, 1989) is an American football coach. He is an offensive quality control coach for the Arizona Cardinals of the National Football League. He was the head football coach for Tiffin University from 2024 to 2025. He also coached for Mount Union, Akron, Indiana Wesleyan, and Saginaw Valley State. He played college football for Mount Union as a center.

== Head coaching record ==
Year	Team	Overall	Conference	Standing	Bowl/playoffs
Tiffin Dragons (Great Midwest Athletic Conference) (2024–2025)
2024	Tiffin	8–4	7–2	T–2nd	L America's Crossroads
2025	Tiffin	7–4	6–3	4th	
Tiffin:		15–8	13–5		
Total:		15–8			
