= Tyler Richardson =

American football player (born 1998)

Profile
- Position: Defensive back

Personal information
- Born: December 5, 1998 (age 27); Cincinnati, Ohio, U.S.
- Listed height: 5 ft 10 in (1.78 m)
- Listed weight: 189 lb (86 kg)

Career information
- High school: La Salle (Cincinnati, Ohio)
- College: Tiffin (2019–2022)
- NFL draft: 2023: undrafted

Career history
- Indianapolis Colts (2023)*; Calgary Stampeders (2023–2025)
- * Offseason or practice squad member only

Awards and highlights
- 2× Second-team All-G-MAC (2019, 2020); Third-team All-G-MAC (2022)
- Stats at CFL.ca

Tyler Richardson (born December 5, 1998) is an American professional football defensive back. He most recently played for the Calgary Stampeders of the Canadian Football League (CFL). Richardson previously played college football for the Tiffin Dragons. He also had a stint in the National Football League (NFL) with the Indianapolis Colts.

== College career ==
Richardson played college football for the Tiffin Dragons from 2019 to 2022. He appeared in 37 games for Tiffin, recording 112 tackles, including 1.5 tackles for loss, 0.5 sack, three interceptions, 21 pass deflections and one fumble recovery. Richardson was named to the All-Great Midwest Athletic Conference team three times, second-team in 2019 and 2020, and third-team in 2022.

== Professional career ==
Pre-draft measurables
Height	Weight	Arm length	Hand span	40-yard dash	10-yard split	20-yard split	20-yard shuttle	Three-cone drill	Vertical jump	Broad jump	Bench press
5 ft 10 in (1.78 m)	193 lb (88 kg)	31 3/4 in (0.81 m)	9 in (0.23 m)	4.46 s	1.64 s	2.65 s	4.28 s	6.95 s	32.5 in (0.83 m)	9 ft 10 in (3.00 m)	11 reps
All values from Pro Day

=== Indianapolis Colts ===
After not being selected in the 2023 NFL draft, Richardson signed with the Indianapolis Colts as an undrafted free agent. He was waived due to medical undisclosed reasons.

=== Calgary Stampeders ===
On September 26, 2023, Richardson signed with the Calgary Stampeders to the practice roster. On November 9, he signed a future active contract with the Stampeders. Richardson was later promoted to the active roster and played in ten games, logging 32 tackles, one interception and one pass break up. In 2025, he played and started in five games before suffering a groin injury in a game against the Saskatchewan Roughriders on July 12, where he made 14 tackles and one pass deflection. Richardson was added to the injured list on July, 18. He was later released at the end of season due to injury.
