= Jim Bickel =

American football coach

Biographical details
- Education: Denison

Coaching career (HC unless noted)
- 1977–1998: Denison (OL/DL/DC)
- 1999–2000: Otterbein (DC)
- 2001–2007: Capital (DC)
- 2008–2009: Capital
- 2010–2012: Ohio Dominican (DC)

Head coaching record
- Overall: 12–8

Jim Bickel is a retired American football coach. He served as the head coach at Capital University in Columbus, Ohio from 2008 to 2009.

Bickel served as an assistant coach in a number of capacities, including at his alma mater Denison University and, before his retirement, as a defensive coordinator at Ohio Dominican University.

== Head coaching record ==
Year	Team	Overall	Conference	Standing	Bowl/playoffs
Capital Crusaders (Ohio Athletic Conference) (2008–2009)
2008	Capital	5–5	4–5	T–5th	
2009	Capital	7–3	6–3	4th	
Capital:		12–8	10–8		
Total:		12–8			
