= John Fankhauser =

American football coach (born c. 1973)

Current position
- Title: Head coach
- Team: Walsh
- Conference: G-MAC
- Record: 25–55

Biographical details
- Born: c. 1973 (age 52–53); Dover, Ohio, U.S.
- Education: Youngstown State University (1996); Walsh University (2006)

Coaching career (HC unless noted)
- 1992–1994: Youngstown State (SA)
- 1995–1996: Youngstown State (ST)
- 1997–?: Walsh (assistant)
- ?–2017: Walsh (AHC/co-DC)
- 2018–present: Walsh

Head coaching record
- Overall: 25–55

John Fankhauser (born c. 1973) is an American college football coach. He is the head football coach for Walsh University, a position he has held since 2018. He also coached for Youngstown State.

== Head coaching record ==
Year	Team	Overall	Conference	Standing	Bowl/playoffs
Walsh Cavaliers (Great Midwest Athletic Conference) (2018–present)
2018	Walsh	4–6	4–4	5th	
2019	Walsh	3–8	2–5	T–5th	
2020–21	Walsh	1–4	1–4	T–5th	
2021	Walsh	2–9	1–6	T–7th	
2022	Walsh	1–9	1–7	T–8th	
2023	Walsh	3–8	1–8	9th	
2024	Walsh	5–6	4–5	T–5th	
2025	Walsh	6–5	4–5	T–6th	
Walsh:		25–55	18–44		
Total:		25–55			
