= G-MAC =

G-MAC or G-Mac may refer to:

- G-MAC: Great Midwest Athletic Conference, United States
- G-Mac: Graham McDowell, golfer
