= Bob Wolfe (American football) =

American football coach (1946–2023)

Biographical details
- Born: November 24, 1946
- Died: March 19, 2023 (aged 76)

Coaching career (HC unless noted)
- 1975: Youngstown State (assistant)
- 1976–1979: Trinity HS (OH)
- 1980–1982: Warren G. Harding HS (OH)
- 1983: Cincinnati (assistant)
- 1984–1985: Allegheny
- 1986–1989: Bowling Green (DC)
- 1990–1997: Tiffin
- 1998: Elyria Catholic HS (OH)
- 1999–2000: Austin Peay (DC)
- 2001–: Notre Dame-Cathedral Latin School (OH)
- 2007–2009: Hiram
- 2010: Chalker HS (OH)
- 2011: John Carroll (JV / off. asst.)
- 2014: Newbury HS (OH) (assistant)

Head coaching record
- Overall: 46–88–3 (college)
- Tournaments: 1–2 (NAIA D-II playoffs)

Robert Wolfe (November 24, 1946 – March 19, 2023) was an American football coach. He served as the head coach at Allegheny College (1984–1985), Tiffin University (1990–1997), and Hiram College (2007–2009), compiling a career college football record of 46–88–3.

== Coaching career ==
Wolfe was the head football coach at Allegheny College in Meadville, Pennsylvania for two season, from 1984 to 1985, compiling a record of 6–14 (.300).

== Head coaching record ==
=== College ===
Year	Team	Overall	Conference	Standing	Bowl/playoffs
Allegheny Gators (North Coast Athletic Conference) (1984–1985)
1984	Allegheny	3–7	1–5	6th	
1985	Allegheny	3–7	1–5	T–6th	
Allegheny:		6–14	2–10		
Tiffin Dragons (NAIA Division II independent) (1990–1993)
1990	Tiffin	1–8–1			
1991	Tiffin	4–6			
1992	Tiffin	4–6			
1993	Tiffin	8–2–1			L NAIA Division II Quarterfinal
Tiffin Dragons (Mid-States Football Association) (1994–1997)
1994	Tiffin	8–4	2–2	4th	L NAIA Division II Quarterfinal
1995	Tiffin	4–6–1	1–3	4th	
1996	Tiffin	2–8	2–4	5th	
1997	Tiffin	4–7	1–5	6th	
Tiffin:		35–47–3	6–14		
Hiram Terriers (North Coast Athletic Conference) (2007–2009)
2007	Hiram	0–10	0–7	10th	
2008	Hiram	3–7	2–5	T–7th	
2009	Hiram	0–10	0–7	10th	
Hiram:		3–27	2–19		
Total:		46–88–3			
