= Tiffin Dragons football =

College football team

- First season: 1986; 40 years ago
- Athletic director: Kelly Daniel (interim); Rudy Brownell (interim)
- Head coach: Brett Ekkens; 2nd season, 8–4 (.667)
- Location: Tiffin, Ohio
- Stadium: Frost–Kalnow Stadium (capacity: 4,500)
- NCAA division: Division II
- Conference: G-MAC
- Colors: Dragon green and Tiffin gold
- All-time record: 174–227–3 (.434)
- Bowl record: 0–2 (.000)

Conference championships
- 2 GLFC (2006–2007); 2 G-MAC (2019–2020)
- Mascot: Blaze the Dragon
- Website: gotiffindragons.com

The Tiffin Dragons football team represents Tiffin University in college football at the NCAA Division II level. The Dragons have been members of the Great Midwest Athletic Conference (G-MAC), fielding their team in the G-MAC since 2008. They play their home games at Frost–Kalnow Stadium in Tiffin, Ohio.

The team's head coach is Brett Ekkens, who assumed the position for the 2024 season.

== Conference affiliations ==
- NAIA independent (1986–1993)
- Mid-States Football Association (1994–2002)
- NCAA Division II independent (2003–2005)
- Great Lakes Football Conference (2006–2007)
- Great Lakes Intercollegiate Athletic Conference (2008–2017)
- Great Midwest Athletic Conference (2018–present)

== List of head coaches ==
=== Key ===
Key to symbols in coaches list
General		Overall		Conference		Postseason (Note: Although the first Rose Bowl Game was played in 1902, it has been continuously played since the 1916 game, and is recognized as the oldest bowl game by the NCAA. "—" indicates any season prior to 1916 when postseason games were not played.)	
No.	Order of coaches (Note: A running total of the number of head coaches, with coaches who served separate tenures being counted only once. Interim head coaches are represented with "Int" and are not counted in the running total. "—" indicates the team played but either without a coach or no coach is on record. "X" indicates an interim year without play.)	GC	Games coached	CW	Conference wins	PW	Postseason wins
DC	Division championships	OW	Overall wins	CL	Conference losses	PL	Postseason losses
CC	Conference championships	OL	Overall losses	CT	Conference ties	PT	Postseason ties
NC	National championships	OT	Overall ties (Note: Overtime rules in college football were introduced in 1996, making ties impossible in the period since.)	C%	Conference winning percentage		
†	Elected to the College Football Hall of Fame	O%	Overall winning percentage (Note: When computing the win–loss percentage, a tie counts as half a win and half a loss.)				

=== Coaches ===
List of head football coaches showing season(s) coached, overall records, conference records, postseason records, and championships
No.	Name	Season(s)	GC	OW	OL	OT	O%	CW	CL	CT	C%	PW	PL	PT	CC
1	Roger Kirkhart	1986–1989	40	7	33	0	0.175	–	–	–	–	–	–	–	–
2	Bob Wolfe	1990–1997	83	35	47	1	0.428	6	14	0	0.300	2	2	0	–
3	Cam Cruickshank	1998–2002	53	19	34	0	0.358	10	14	0	0.417	–	–	–	–
4	Nate Cole	2003–2007	55	36	19	0	0.655	9	1	0	0.900	–	–	–	2
5	Dave Walkowsky	2008–2010	32	2	30	0	0.063	1	30	0	0.032	–	–	–	–
6	Gary Goff	2011–2018	88	38	50	0	0.432	29	47	0	0.382	–	–	–	–
7	Cris Reisert	2019–2023	48	38	10	0	0.744	30	4	0	0.852	0	1	–	2
8	Brett Ekkens	2024–present	12	8	4	0	0.667	7	2	0	0.778	–	–	–	–

== Year-by-year results since 1986 ==
National champions	Conference champions	Bowl game berth	Playoff berth

Season	Year	Head coach	Association	Division	Conference	Record							Postseason	Final ranking
Season	Year	Head coach	Association	Division	Conference	Overall			Conference				Postseason	Final ranking
Season	Year	Head coach	Association	Division	Conference	Win	Loss	Tie	Finish	Win	Loss	Tie	Postseason	Final ranking
Tiffin Dragons
1986	1986	Roger Kirkhart	NAIA	Division II	Independent	2	8	0					—	—
1987	1987	Roger Kirkhart	NAIA	Division II	Independent	1	9	0					—	—
1988	1988	Roger Kirkhart	NAIA	Division II	Independent	2	8	0					—	—
1989	1989	Roger Kirkhart	NAIA	Division II	Independent	2	8	0					—	—
1990	1990	Bob Wolfe	NAIA	Division II	Independent	1	8	1					—	—
1991	1991	Bob Wolfe	NAIA	Division II	Independent	4	6	0					—	—
1992	1992	Bob Wolfe	NAIA	Division II	Independent	4	6	0					—	—
1993	1993	Bob Wolfe	NAIA	Division II	Independent	8	2	1					L NAIA Division II Quarterfinal	7
1994	1994	Bob Wolfe	NAIA	Division II	MSFA	8	4	0	T–2nd (Mideast)	2	2	0	L NAIA Division II Quarterfinal	16
1995	1995	Bob Wolfe	NAIA	Division II	MSFA	4	6	1	4th (Mideast)	1	3	0	—	—
1996	1996	Bob Wolfe	NAIA	Division II	MSFA	2	8	0	5th (Mideast)	2	4	0	—	—
1997	1997	Bob Wolfe	NAIA	—	MSFA	4	7	0	6th (Mideast)	1	5	0	—	—
1998	1998	Cam Cruickshank	NAIA	—	MSFA	6	5	0	4th (Mideast)	3	3	0	—	—
1999	1999	Cam Cruickshank	NAIA	—	MSFA	5	6	0	5th (Mideast)	2	4	0	—	—
2000	2000	Cam Cruickshank	NAIA	—	MSFA	3	7	0	T–5th (Mideast)	2	4	0	—	—
2001	2001	Cam Cruickshank	NAIA	—	MSFA	3	8	0	4th (Mideast)	3	3	0	—	—
2002	2002	Cam Cruickshank	NAIA	—	MSFA	2	8	0	N/A				—	—
2003	2003	Nate Cole	NCAA	Division II	Independent	6	5	0					—	—
2004	2004	Nate Cole	NCAA	Division II	Independent	5	6	0					—	—
2005	2005	Nate Cole	NCAA	Division II	Independent	6	5	0					—	—
2006	2006	Nate Cole	NCAA	Division II	GLFC	10	1	0	T–1st	4	1	0	Conference champions	22
2007	2007	Nate Cole	NCAA	Division II	GLFC	9	2	0	1st	5	0	0	Conference champions	—
2008	2008	Dave Walkowsky	NCAA	Division II	GLIAC	1	9	0	T–11th	1	10	0	—	—
2009	2009	Dave Walkowsky	NCAA	Division II	GLIAC	0	11	0	T–11th	0	10	0	—	—
2010	2010	Dave Walkowsky	NCAA	Division II	GLIAC	1	10	0	7th (South)	0	10	0	—	—
2011	2011	Gary Goff	NCAA	Division II	GLIAC	0	11	0	7th (South)	0	10	0	—	—
2012	2012	Gary Goff	NCAA	Division II	GLIAC	3	8	0	T–5th (South)	2	8	0	—	—
2013	2013	Gary Goff	NCAA	Division II	GLIAC	2	9	0	T–6th (South)	1	8	0	—	—
2014	2014	Gary Goff	NCAA	Division II	GLIAC	5	6	0	T–7th	4	6	0	—	—
2015	2015	Gary Goff	NCAA	Division II	GLIAC	5	6	0	T–10th	4	6	0	—	—
2016	2016	Gary Goff	NCAA	Division II	GLIAC	8	3	0	4th	7	3	0	—	—
2017	2017	Gary Goff	NCAA	Division II	GLIAC	6	5	0	T–4th	5	4	0	—	—
2018	2018	Gary Goff	NCAA	Division II	G-MAC	9	2	0	T–2nd	6	2	0	—	—
2019	2019	Cris Reisert	NCAA	Division II	G-MAC	9	2	0	1st	7	0	0	L NCAA Division II First Round	23
2020–21	2020	Cris Reisert	NCAA	Division II	G-MAC	6	0	0	1st	5	0	0	Conference champions	—
2021	2021	Cris Reisert	NCAA	Division II	G-MAC	8	3	0	T–2nd	5	2	0	—	—
2022	2022	Cris Reisert	NCAA	Division II	G-MAC	6	5	0	T–2nd	6	2	0	L America's Crossroads	—
2023	2023	Cris Reisert	NCAA	Division II	G-MAC	11	1	0	1st	9	0	0	L NCAA Division II Second Round	14
2024	2024	Brett Ekkens	NCAA	Division II	G-MAC	8	4	0	T–2nd	7	2	0	L America's Crossroads	—

== Notable former players ==
- Chris Ivory
- Nate Washington
