= Lee Owens =

American football coach

Biographical details
- Born: July 16, 1956 (age 70)

Coaching career (HC unless noted)
- 1977: Waynesfield-Goshen HS (OH) (assistant)
- 1978–1980: Ashland Crestview HS (OH) (assistant)
- 1981–1982: Ashland Crestview HS (OH)
- 1983–1986: Galion HS (OH)
- 1987: Lancaster HS (OH)
- 1988–1991: Massillon Washington HS (OH)
- 1992–1994: Ohio State (TE/OT)
- 1995–2003: Akron
- 2004–2022: Ashland

Head coaching record
- Overall: 177–122 (college); 89–32–6 (high school)
- Tournaments: 3–6 (NCAA D-II playoffs)

Accomplishments and honors

Championships
- 1 MAC East Division (2000); 1 GLIAC (2015, 2017); 3 GLIAC South Division (2012, 2015–2016); 1 GMAC (2022)

Awards
- 4× GLIAC Coach of the Year (2005, 2012, 2015, 2017)

Lee Owens (born July 17, 1956) is an American former football coach. He served as the head football coach at the University of Akron from 1995 to 2003 and Ashland University in Ashland, Ohio from 2004 to 2022, compiled a career college football coaching record of 177–122. Between 1981 and 1991, he was the head football coach at four high schools in Ohio and then an assistant coach at Ohio State University from 1992 to 1994. Owens directed the Galion Tigers to the D-II Ohio State Championship in 1985. He earned his Bachelor of Arts degree from Bluffton College in 1977.

== Head coaching record ==
=== High school ===
Year	Team	Overall	Conference	Standing	Bowl/playoffs
Crestview Cougars () (1981–1982)
1981	Crestview	10–0			
1982	Crestview	4–5–1			
Crestview:		14–5–1			
Galion Tigers () (1983–1986)
1983	Galion	3–7			
1984	Galion	7–2–1			
1985	Galion	14–0			
1986	Galion	9–2			
Galion:		33–11–1			
Lancaster Golden Gales () (1987)
1987	Lancaster	7–3			
Lancaster:		7–3			
Massillon Washington Tigers () (1988–1991)
1988	Massillon Washington	7–3			
1989	Massillon Washington	10–3			
1990	Massillon Washington	8–4			
1991	Massillon Washington	10–3			
Massillon Washington:		35–13			
Total:		89–32–6			

=== College ===
Year	Team	Overall	Conference	Standing	Bowl/playoffs	AFCA^{#}
Akron Zips (Mid-American Conference) (1995–2003)
1995	Akron	2–9	2–6	T–7th		
1996	Akron	4–7	3–5	T–6th		
1997	Akron	2–9	2–7	6th (East)		
1998	Akron	4–7	3–6	5th (East)		
1999	Akron	7–4	5–3	T–3rd (East)		
2000	Akron	6–5	5–3	T–1st (East)		
2001	Akron	4–7	4–4	5th (East)		
2002	Akron	4–8	3–5	5th (East)		
2003	Akron	7–5	5–3	3rd (East)		
Akron:		40–61	32–42			
Ashland Eagles (Great Lakes Intercollegiate Athletic Conference) (2004–2021)
2004	Ashland	5–6	4–6	T–7th		
2005	Ashland	9–2	8–2	3rd		
2006	Ashland	4–6	4–6	9th		
2007	Ashland	8–2	8–1	2nd	L NCAA Division II First Round	22
2008	Ashland	9–4	8–2	2nd	L NCAA Division II Second Round	15
2009	Ashland	6–5	6–4	T–5th		
2010	Ashland	8–3	7–3	3rd (South)		
2011	Ashland	6–5	6–4	T–3rd (South)		
2012	Ashland	11–1	10–0	1st (South)	L NCAA Division II Second Round	9
2013	Ashland	5–5	5–4	3rd (South)		
2014	Ashland	8–2	8–2	2nd (South)		
2015	Ashland	10–1	10–0	1st (South)	L NCAA Division II First Round	10
2016	Ashland	9–2	7–2	1st (South)		19
2017	Ashland	11–2	9–0	1st	L NCAA Division II Second Round	10
2018	Ashland	6–4	6–2	3rd		
2019	Ashland	7–4	6–2	3rd		
2020–21	No team—COVID-19					
Ashland Eagles (Great Midwest Athletic Conference) (2021–2022)
2021	Ashland	5–5	4–3	T–4th		
2022	Ashland	10–2	7–1	1st	L NCAA Division II Second Round	13
Ashland:		137–61	123–44			
Total:		177–122				
