= Kory Allen =

American football coach (born c. 1977)

Current position
- Title: Associate Head coach/Tight Ends coach
- Team: Toledo
- Conference: MAC

Biographical details
- Born: c. 1977 (age 48–49); Albion, New York, U.S.
- Education: Ohio Northern University (2000)

Playing career
- 1996–1999: Ohio Northern
- Position: Offensive lineman

Coaching career (HC unless noted)
- 2000: Ohio Northern (GA)
- 2001–2003: Ohio Northern (OL)
- 2004: Baldwin Wallace (OL)
- 2005–2021: Findlay (OC)
- 2022–2025: Findlay
- 2026–present: Toledo (AHC/TE)

Head coaching record
- Overall: 33–12

Accomplishments and honors

Awards
- First Team All-OAC (1999)

Kory Allen (born c. 1977) is an American college football coach.

Allen played college football at Ohio Northern, before a coaching career that included various assistant coaching positions at Ohio Northern, Baldwin Wallace, and Findlay. He was named head coach of Findlay in 2022, a position he held until resigning on December 14, 2025. Five days later, new Toledo head coach Mike Jacobs confirmed that Allen had joined his staff as associate head coach and tight ends coach.

== Head coaching record ==
Year	Team	Overall	Conference	Standing	Bowl/playoffs	AFCA^{#}	D2.com^{°}
Findlay Oilers (Great Midwest Athletic Conference) (2022–present)
2022	Findlay	7–4	6–2	T–2nd			
2023	Findlay	7–4	6–3	T–3rd			
2024	Findlay	9–2	7–2	T–2nd			
2025	Findlay	10–2	8–1	T–1st	L NCAA Division II First Round	19	17
Findlay:		33–12	27–8				
Total:		33–12					
