= Michael Jerrell =

American football player (born 1998)

No. 72 – Atlanta Falcons
- Position: Offensive tackle
- Roster status: Injured reserve

Personal information
- Born: August 18, 1999 (age 27); Indianapolis, Indiana, U.S.
- Listed height: 6 ft 5 in (1.96 m)
- Listed weight: 309 lb (140 kg)

Career information
- High school: Pike (Indianapolis, Indiana)
- College: Findlay (2018–2023)
- NFL draft: 2024: 6th round, 207th overall pick

Career history
- Seattle Seahawks (2024); Atlanta Falcons (2025–present)

Awards and highlights
- GMAC Offensive Lineman of the Year (2023); 3× First-team All-GMAC (2020-21, 2022, 2023); Third-team All-GMAC (2021)

Career NFL statistics as of Week 5, 2026
- Games played: 16
- Games started: 3
- Stats at Pro Football Reference

Michael Jerrell (born August 18, 1999) is an American professional football offensive tackle for the Atlanta Falcons of the National Football League (NFL). He played college football for the Findlay Oilers and was selected by the Seattle Seahawks in the sixth round of the 2024 NFL draft.

== Early life ==
Jerrell was born on August 18, 1999, in west Indianapolis, Indiana, where he grew up. He first played basketball before trying out football in sixth grade. He attended Pike High School in Indianapolis where he was a reserve tight end before switching to offensive tackle as a senior, earning All-Indiana and All-Metropolitan Interscholastic Conference honors. However, he received little attention as a recruit, receiving no offers from teams at the NCAA Division I level. Jerrell ultimately chose to play for the Division II Findlay Oilers over four other Division II offers.

== College career ==
Jerrell saw action in eight games as a true freshman at Findlay in 2018, but then appeared in no games over the next two years, which included the 2020 season being canceled due to the COVID-19 pandemic. He started all six games during the spring 2021 season and helped the team have the top scoring offense in the Great Midwest Athletic Conference (GMAC) while being selected first-team All-GMAC. He was chosen third-team All-GMAC in the fall 2021 season after starting all 12 games.

Jerrell started all 11 games in 2022 and was chosen first-team All-GMAC and second-team All-American by D2Football.com. He returned for a final season in 2023 and was chosen first-team All-GMAC, first-team All-Super Region 1, honorable mention All-American, and GMAC Offensive Lineman of the Year. He ended his collegiate career with 48 games played and 40 straight starts, second-most for offensive linemen in team history. Jerrell had received offers to play for larger schools during his time at Findlay, but opted to remain there. He received an undergraduate degree and a Master of Business Administration from Findlay.

== Professional career ==
Pre-draft measurables
| Height | Weight | Arm length | Hand span | Wingspan | 40-yard dash | 10-yard split | 20-yard split | 20-yard shuttle | Three-cone drill | Vertical jump | Broad jump | Bench press |
|---|---|---|---|---|---|---|---|---|---|---|---|---|
| 6 ft 4 3/8 in (1.94 m) | 309 lb (140 kg) | 33 7/8 in (0.86 m) | 9 1/4 in (0.23 m) | 6 ft 8 7/8 in (2.05 m) | 4.96 s | 1.69 s | 2.82 s | 4.81 s | 7.96 s | 32.5 in (0.83 m) | 8 ft 7 in (2.62 m) | 26 reps |
All values from Pro Day

=== Seattle Seahawks ===
Jerrell competed at the Hula Bowl and impressed with his performance at his pro day. He was selected in the sixth round (207th overall) of the 2024 NFL draft by the Seattle Seahawks. He became the fourth player in school history to be selected in the draft and was the only Division II player chosen. On Sunday October 20, 2024, Jerrell started his first NFL game at right tackle against the Atlanta Falcons.

=== Atlanta Falcons ===
On August 27, 2025, Jerrell was traded to the Atlanta Falcons in exchange for a conditional 2027 seventh-round pick.
