= Tyrone Young (American football coach) =

American football coach (born c. 1989)

Current position
- Title: Head coach
- Team: Kentucky Wesleyan
- Conference: G-MAC
- Record: 8–36

Biographical details
- Born: c. 1989 (age 36–37); Grayson, Kentucky, U.S.
- Education: Kentucky Christian University (2012)

Playing career
- 2008–2011: Kentucky Christian
- Positions: Linebacker, offensive lineman, defensive lineman

Coaching career (HC unless noted)
- 2011: East Charter HS (KY) (OL/DL)
- 2012: Kentucky Christian (RB)
- 2013–2016: King's (PA) (ST/DB/LB)
- 2017: Lock Haven (ST/DB)
- 2018: Anderson (IN) (DC/ST/DB)
- 2019–2020: Kentucky Wesleyan (DC)
- 2021: Kentucky Wesleyan (AHC/DC)
- 2022–present: Kentucky Wesleyan

Head coaching record
- Overall: 8–36

Tyrone Young Jr. (born c. 1989) is an American college football coach. He is the head football coach for Kentucky Wesleyan College, a position he has held since 2022. He also coached for East Charter High School, Kentucky Christian, King's, Lock Haven, and Anderson (IN). He played college football for Kentucky Christian as a linebacker, offensive lineman, and defensive lineman.

== Head coaching record ==
Year	Team	Overall	Conference	Standing	Bowl/playoffs
Kentucky Wesleyan Panthers (Great Midwest Athletic Conference) (2022–present)
2022	Kentucky Wesleyan	2–9	1–7	T–8th	
2023	Kentucky Wesleyan	4–7	3–6	T–7th	
2024	Kentucky Wesleyan	2–9	1–8	T–9th	
2025	Kentucky Wesleyan	0–11	0–9	10th	
Kentucky Wesleyan:		8–36	5–30		
Total:		8–36			
