= George Whitfield Jr. =

American football player (born 1977)

- Born: November 23, 1977 (age 48); Wichita, Kansas, U.S.
- Occupations: Founder of Whitfield Athletix, private quarterback coach
- Organizations: Chicago Rush; Bossier-Shreveport Battle Wings; Louisville Fire; Memphis Xplorers

George Whitfield Jr. (born November 23, 1977) is an American former college football and arena football quarterback. He now resides in San Diego, California and is currently running a quarterback training academy Whitfield Athletix. He was introduced to football by his father, George Whitfield Sr., former collegiate football player at Wichita State in the early 1970s.

== Early life ==
George played for the Massillon Tigers, Massillon, Ohio, football team from 1992 to 1995.

== College ==
In 1996 Whitfield was recruited to play by Jim Tressel, then the head coach of Youngstown State University. During the 1996 season, Whitfield was forced to watch from the sidelines, and as a result, he transferred to Tiffin University to play for Coach Bob Wolfe and the Dragons the following season. Between 1997 and 2000, Whitfield became Tiffin University's all-time leading passer, with 368 completions for 4391 yards and 39 touchdowns.

== Whitfield Athletix ==
In 2004, he established Whitfield Athletix, a specialized quarterback training academy based out of San Diego, California.

== Notable trainees ==
In 2011, Heisman Trophy winning quarterback and first overall selection Cam Newton began working with George Whitfield Jr. in preparation for the NFL draft.

In 2012, NFL veteran and free agent Donovan McNabb sought out Whitfield's services to aid in offseason weight loss and to prepare for the upcoming season.

== Other trainees ==
- Andrew Luck
- Jameis Winston
- Johnny Manziel
- Bryce Petty
- Landry Jones
- Tajh Boyd
- Taylor Kelly
- Braxton Miller
- Connor Cook
- Logan Thomas
- EJ Manuel
- Marquise Williams
- Charlie Heller
- Austin Appleby
- Josh Allen
