= Gary R. Heminger =

American businessman

- Born: 1952 or 1953 (age 72–73)
- Education: Tiffin University; University of Dayton
- Occupation: Businessman
- Title: Chairman and CEO, Marathon Petroleum

Gary R. Heminger (born 1952/1953) is an American businessman, and the former chairman and chief executive of Marathon Petroleum, a US-based oil refining, marketing, and pipeline transport company, and a Fortune Global 500 company.

== Early life ==
Heminger earned a bachelor's degree in accounting from Tiffin University in 1976, and a master's degree in business administration from the University of Dayton in 1982.

== Career ==
Heminger served as the CEO of Marathon Petroleum from 30 June 2011 until 18 March 2020. Heminger began working for Marathon in 1975. He spent three years in London as audit supervisor of the Brae Project and eight years with Emro Marketing in several marketing and commercial roles. In 1991, he was named vice president of Emro Marketing’s Western Division. From 1995 to 1996, he served as president of Marathon Pipe Line Company.

Time reported in March 2018 that Heminger earned 935 times more than Marathon Petroleum's median employee.

== Memberships ==
Heminger was appointed to a nine-year term on the Ohio State University board of trustees by Governor John Kasich. Heminger’s term was extended from June 11, 2018, to May 13, 2027.
