= Albanese Candy Bowl =

NCAA Division II football bowl game

- Stadium: Brickyard Stadium, Hobart High School
- Location: Hobart, Indiana, U.S.
- Operated: 2019–present
- Conference tie-ins: GLVC, G-MAC

Sponsors
- Albanese Confectionery Group, Inc.

Former names
- America's Crossroads Bowl (2019–2024)

The Albanese Candy Bowl is an annual NCAA Division II college football bowl game held at Brickyard Stadium in Hobart, Indiana. The game operates as a partnership between the Great Lakes Valley Conference (GLVC), the Great Midwest Athletic Conference (G-MAC), the South Shore Convention and Visitors Authority, and the city of Hobart, Indiana. Originally known as America's Crossroads Bowl, the game was renamed in 2025 when Albanese Confectionery Group of Hobart became its title sponsor.

Currently, the Albanese Candy Bowl is one of three Division II sanctioned bowl games, along with the Heritage Bowl and First Americans Bowl. The top-placing teams from the GLVC and G-MAC not qualifying for the NCAA Division II Football Championship playoffs receive an invitation to compete.

== History ==
The creation of America's Crossroads Bowl was announced in April 2019, at a joint press conference including officials of the GLVC, the G-MAC, the South Shore Convention and Visitors Authority, and the city of Hobart.

In the seasons prior to the creation of the bowl, neither the GLVC nor the G-MAC had ever sent more than one team to the Division II playoffs, and it was assumed the game would match the second-place finishers of the two conferences. For the G-MAC, this was the case for every game through 2024, with the conference sending a team finishing the season in second (or a second-place tie) behind the conference's lone Division II playoff qualifier. In 2025, when the G-MAC sent three teams to the playoffs, the conference was represented by fifth-place Hillsdale rather than fourth-place Tiffin, which had gone to the bowl the previous year.

The GLVC sent third-place Truman State as its representative to the inaugural game, because Lindenwood and Indianapolis both qualified for the Division II playoffs in 2019. After the 2020 game was cancelled due to the COVID-19 pandemic, Truman State once again represented the GLVC in 2021 as a third-place team, when Lindenwood qualified for the playoffs and Indianapolis declined the bowl bid. In the years 2022–24, the GLVC, like the G-MAC, sent a team finishing in second place or in a second-place tie. In 2025, the conference sent third-place Upper Iowa to the bowl, because Indianapolis and Truman State both qualified for the playoffs. Starting in 2023, the GLVC has made the game optional for the previous year's participant.

The game is played on the afternoon of the first Saturday in December, the most common date for NCAA Division II bowl games. The only exception was the 2023 contest, which was played as a night game on the first Friday in December. That game was also played at Hammond Central High School Stadium in Hammond, Indiana, rather than in Hobart.

The 2022 game brought an estimated $200,000 in economic impact to the Hobart area. The South Shore Convention and Visitors Authority anticipated an economic impact of "at least $240,000" from the 2023 game in Hammond.

== Trophy ==
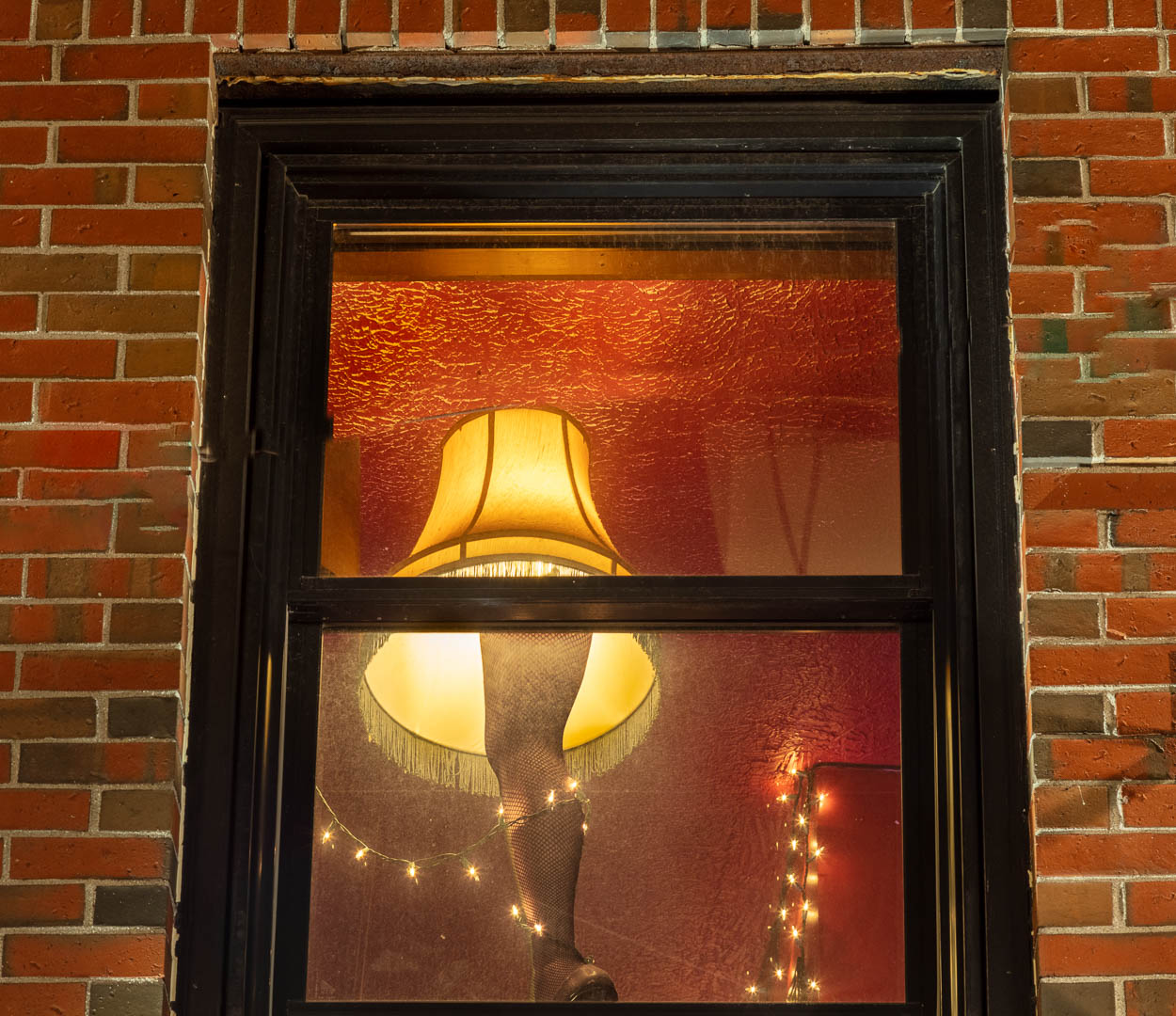
The leg lamp in A Christmas Story

In addition to the official Albanese Candy Bowl trophy awarded to the winning team, a replica of the leg lamp from the classic holiday film A Christmas Story serves as a traveling trophy held by the conference office of the winning team. The setting for A Christmas Story, the fictional northwest Indiana town of Hohman, is based on Hammond, the real-life hometown of its author, humorist Jean Shepherd. The director of A Christmas Story, Bob Clark, played quarterback at Hillsdale, which has represented the G-MAC twice in the bowl game.

== Game results ==
Date played	Winning team		Losing team		notes
December 7, 2019	Truman State (GLVC)	21	Ohio Dominican (G-MAC)	7	
December 4, 2021	Truman State (GLVC)	34	Hillsdale (G-MAC)	17	
December 3, 2022	Truman State (GLVC)	28	Tiffin (G-MAC)	27	
December 1, 2023	Ashland (G-MAC)	23	McKendree (GLVC)	20	
December 7, 2024	Truman State (GLVC)	29	Tiffin (G-MAC)	10	
December 6, 2025	Upper Iowa (GLVC)	37	Hillsdale (G-MAC)	28	

== Wins by conference ==
Conference	Games	Win	Loss	Pct
Great Lakes Valley Conference	6	5	1	.833
Great Midwest Athletic Conference	6	1	5	.167

== Appearances by team ==
Team	Appearances	Record
Truman State	4	4–0
Ashland	1	1–0
Upper Iowa	1	1–0
McKendree	1	0–1
Ohio Dominican	1	0–1
Hillsdale	2	0–2
Tiffin	2	0–2
