= Ohio Dominican University =

Private university in Columbus, Ohio, US

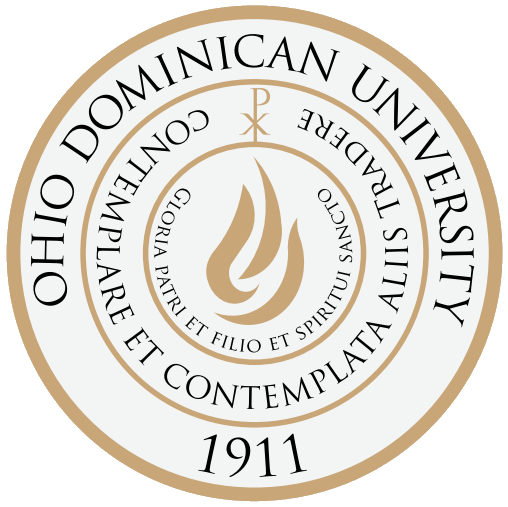
- Former names: College of St. Mary of the Springs (1911–1968); Ohio Dominican College (1968–2002)
- Motto: "Contemplare et contemplata aliis tradere" (Latin)
- Motto in English: To contemplate truth and to share with others the fruits of this contemplation
- Type: Private university
- Established: 1911; 115 years ago
- Affiliations: Roman Catholic (Dominican Order)
- Academic affiliations: ACCU, CIC, NAICU, ICUSTA
- Endowment: $18.9 million (2020)
- President: Shonna Riedlinger
- Faculty: 234
- Students: 1,252
- Location: Columbus, Ohio, U.S. 39.9927°N 82.9411°W
- Campus: Urban, 75 acres (300,000 m^{2})
- Colors: Black & yellow
- Nickname: Panthers
- Sporting affiliations: NCAA Division II – G-MAC
- Website: ohiodominican.edu

Ohio Dominican University is a private Catholic university in Columbus, Ohio, United States. In 2024, the university had 1,252 students and offered undergraduate degrees in 42 majors as well as 9 graduate degree programs.

== History ==
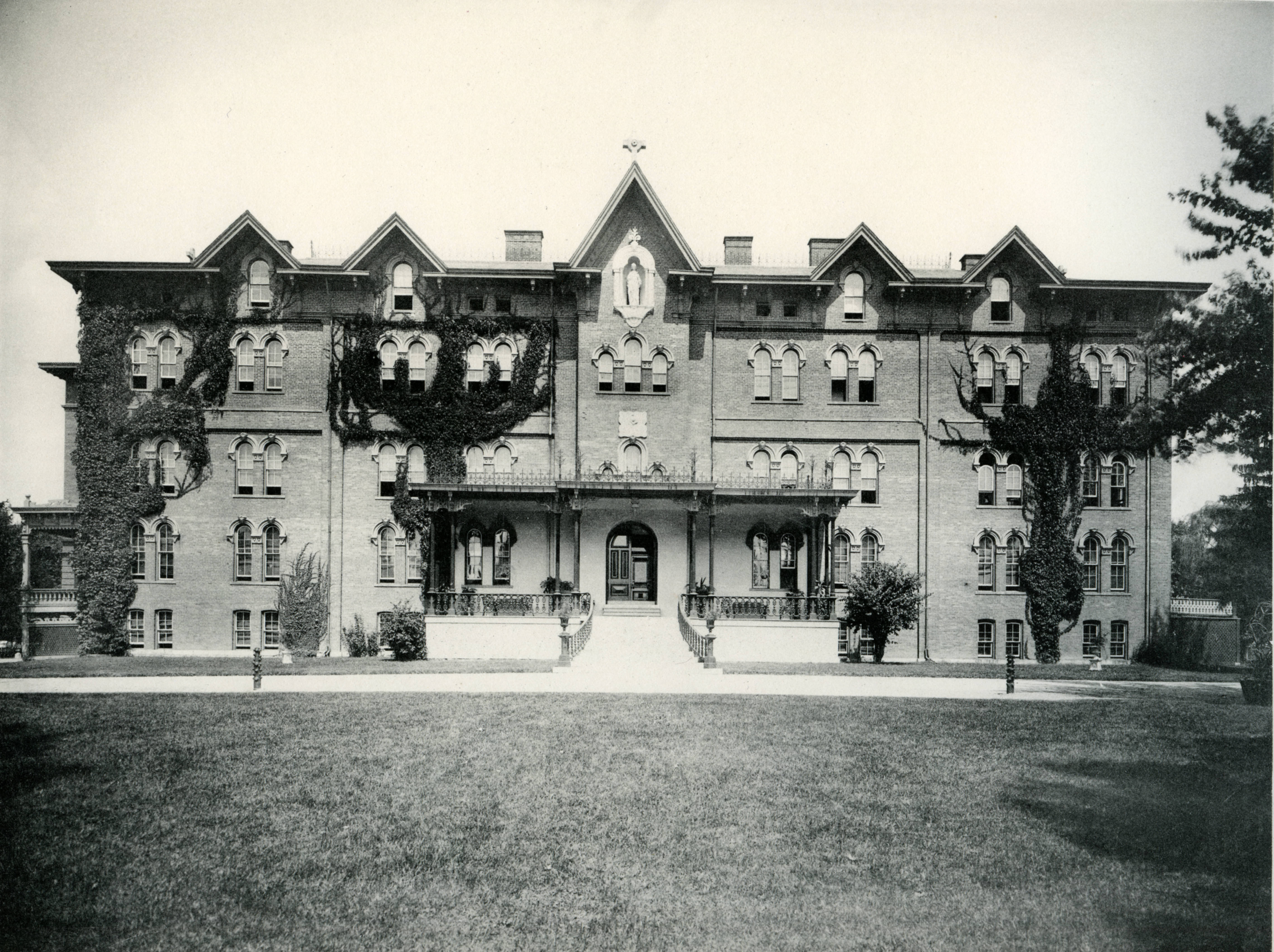
The Motherhouse of the Academy of St. Mary of the Springs

The College of St. Mary of the Springs was chartered in 1911 as an all-women's school. It became coeducational in 1964 and changed its name to Ohio Dominican College four years later. In 2002, its name changed to Ohio Dominican University.

== The Charles School ==
The Charles School at Ohio Dominican University opened in 2007 with the goal to significantly improve college success for young people in Central Ohio. The public charter high school is part of a nationwide network of Early College High Schools initiated through funds from the Bill and Melinda Gates Foundation and other organizations. The Charles School (TCS) is open to all Ohio students entering the 9th grade, with a target population of students who have a desire to go to college and would be the first in their family to do so. Students have the opportunity to graduate with a high school diploma and up to 62 hours of college credit and/or an associate degree, at no cost to the student.

== Athletics ==
Ohio Dominican athletics mark

The Ohio Dominican teams, nicknamed the Panthers, compete in the NCAA Division II as members of the Great Midwest Athletic Conference (G-MAC).

ODU joined the GMAC on July 1, 2017. Ohio Dominican originally joined the Great Lakes Intercollegiate Athletic Conference in 2010 as part of the transition to NCAA Division II from the National Association of Intercollegiate Athletics (NAIA). The university currently offers 14 varsity sports including: men's and women's basketball, baseball, men's and women's cross country, football, men's and women's golf, men's and women's soccer, softball, men's and women's track and field (indoor and outdoor), and women's volleyball.

== Notable alumni and faculty ==
=== Alumni ===
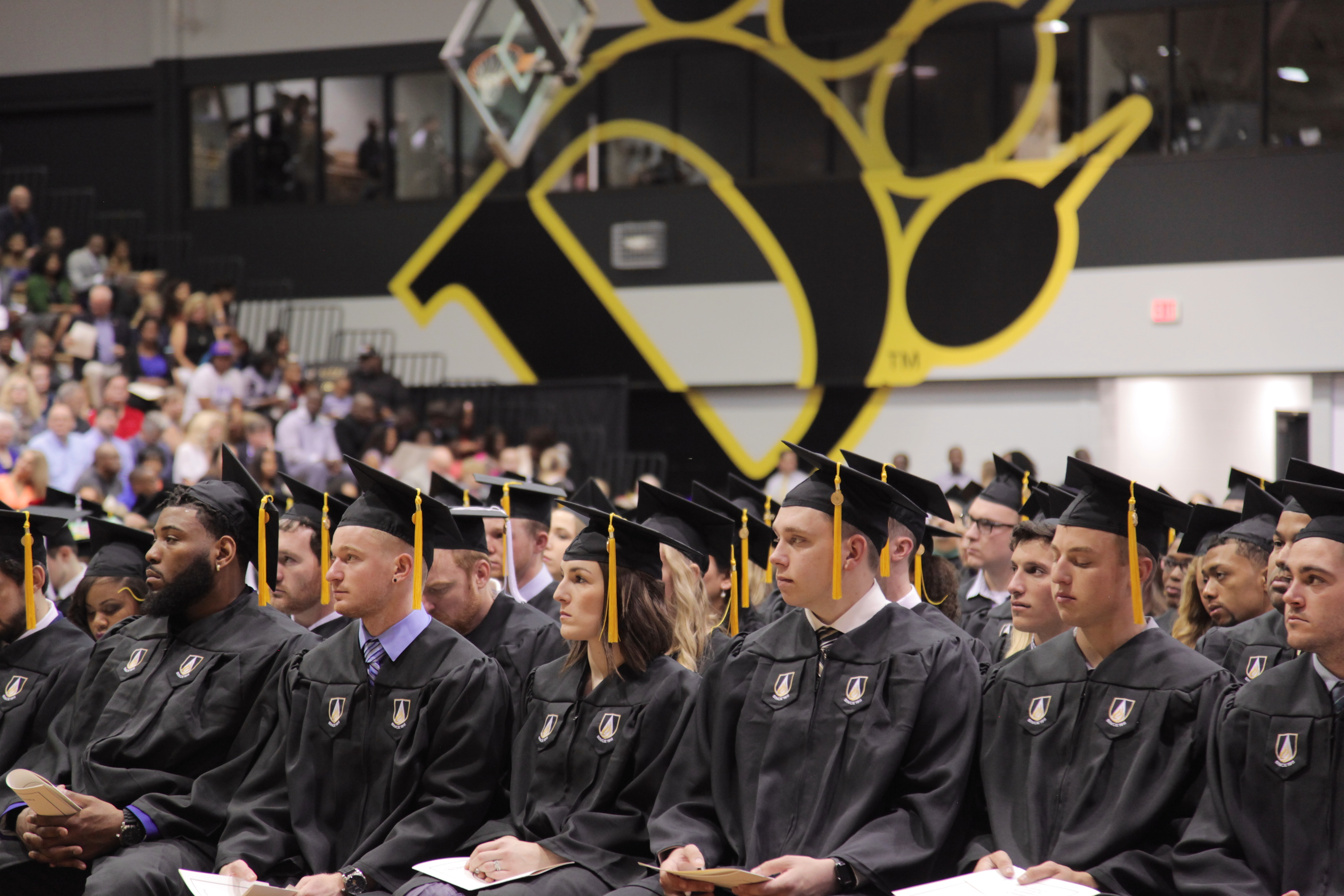
ODU graduates

- Jonathan Sánchez, Major League Baseball pitcher
- Anne O'Hare McCormick (1880–1954), News correspondent
- Adam Ibrahim OHirsi, Former Governor of Gedo, Somalia
- Christian Nodal, Mexican singer and songwriter

=== Presidents ===
Name	Dates
Stephanie Mohun	1911–1914
Constance Keelty	1914–1917
Justina Hogan	1917–1920
Maria Theresa	1920–1923
Regina Murphy	1923–1926
Adele Heffley	1926–1932
Bernardine Lynam	1932–1935
Aloyse Fitzpatrick	1935–1944
Anacletus Oger	1944–1947
Angelita Conley	1947–1964
Suzanne Uhrhane	1964–1978
Mary Andrew Matesich	1978–2001
Jack Calareso	2001–2007
James A. Griffin	2007–2008 (interim)
Brian Nedwek	2008–2009
Ronald J. Seiffert	2009–2010 (interim)
Peter Cimbolic	2010–2017
Robert Gervasi	2017–June 2021
Connie Gallaher	June 2021 – 2024
Shonna Riedlinger	January 2024 – present

== Gallery ==
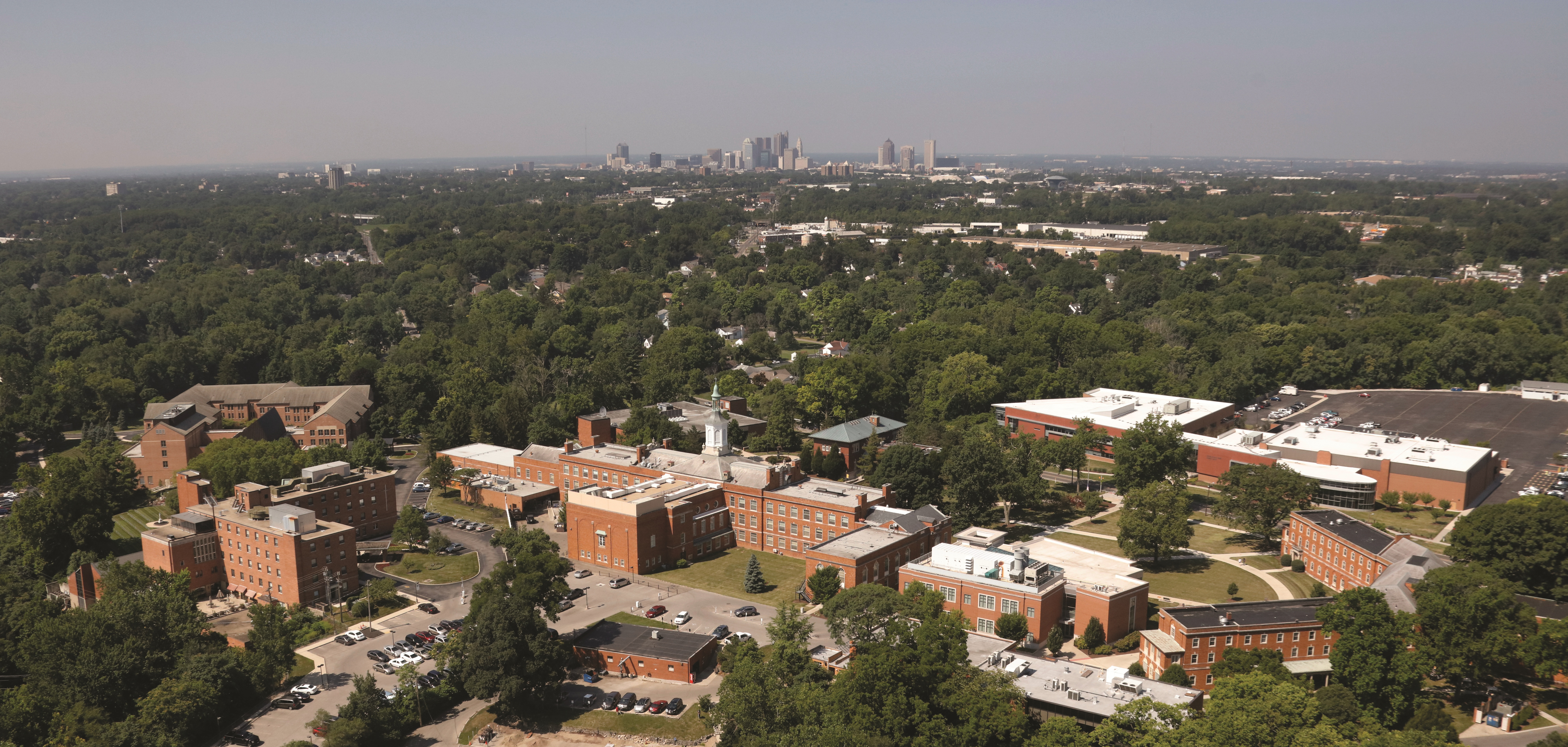
View of the campus

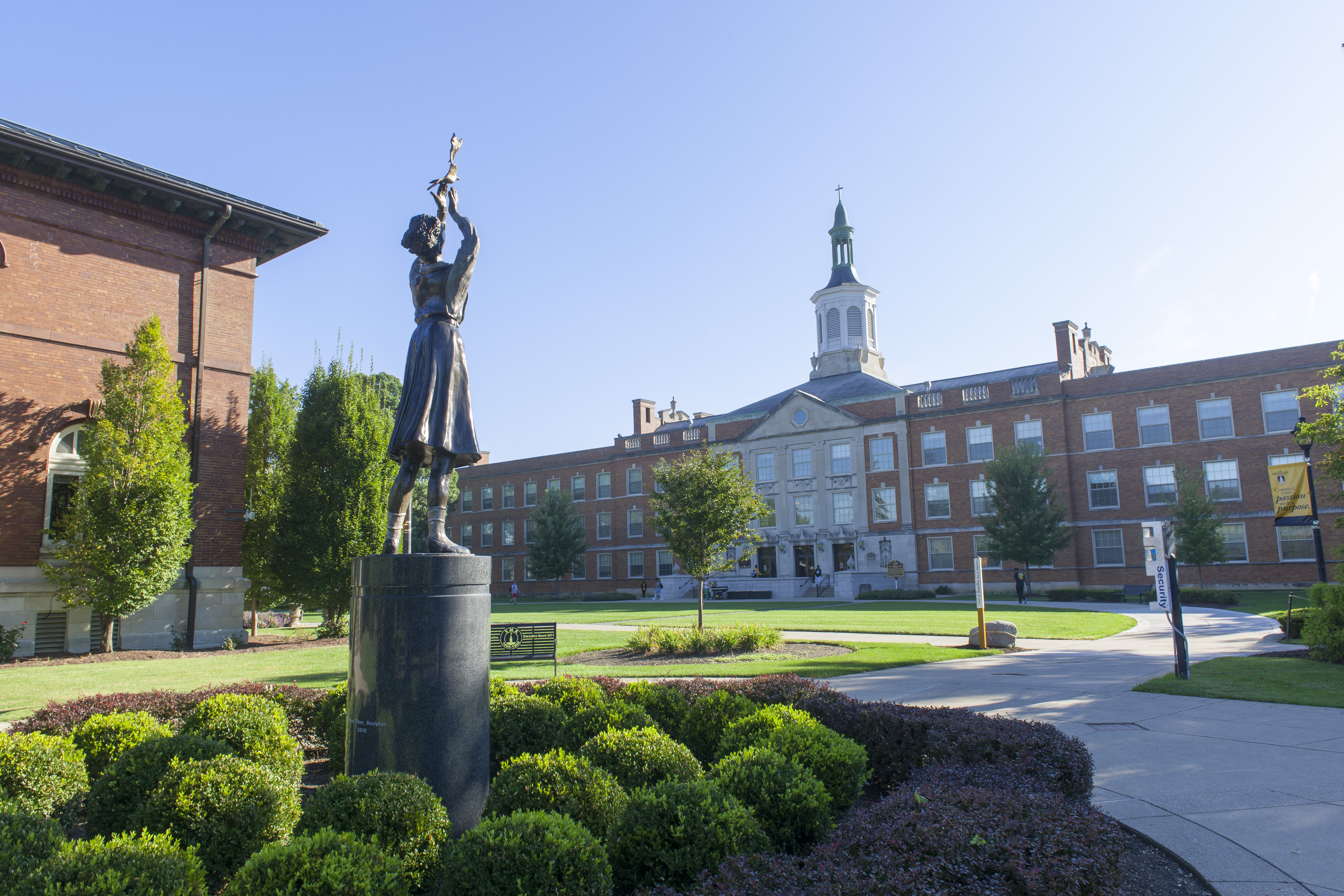
Erskine Hall

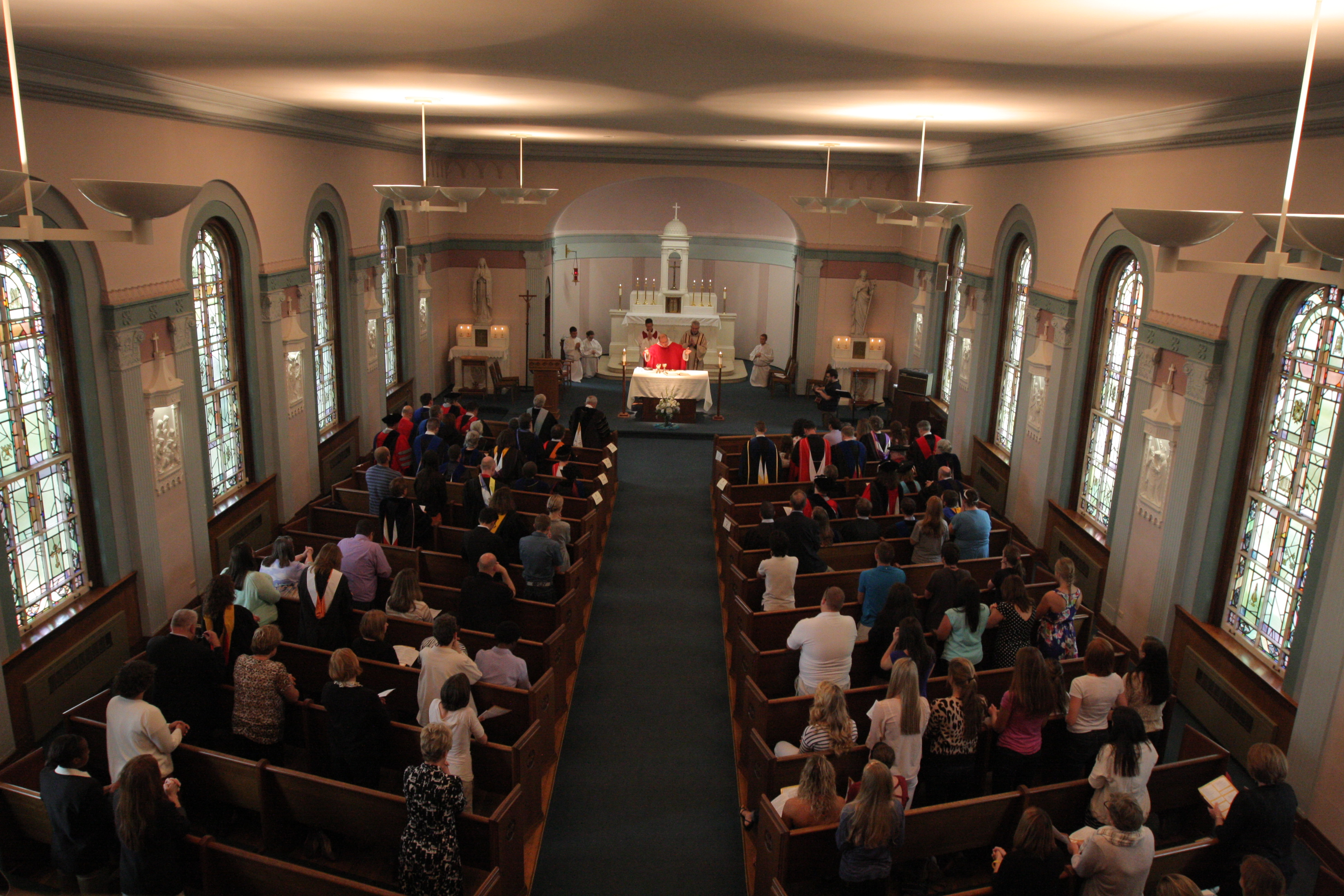
Chapel

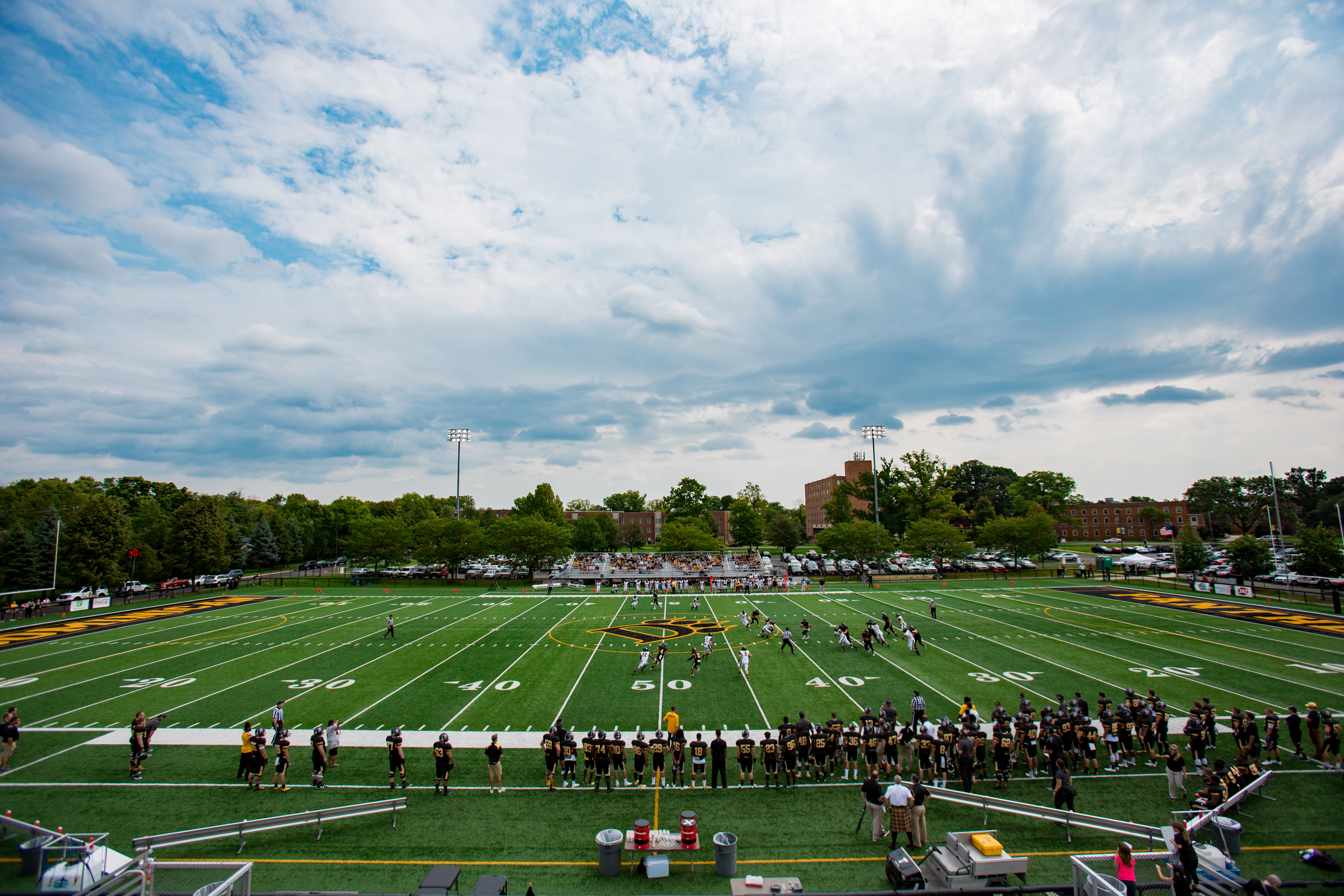
Panther Stadium
