= Tiffin University =

Private university in Tiffin, Ohio, US

- Motto: Sine Audacia Nullum Praemium
- Motto in English: Without risk, there is no gain
- Type: Private university
- Established: 1888; 138 years ago
- President: Lillian Schumacher
- Students: 3,975 (fall 2024)
- Undergraduates: 2,842 (fall 2024)
- Postgraduates: 989 (fall 2024)
- Location: Tiffin, Ohio, U.S.
- Campus: Suburban 130 acres (53 ha)
- Colors: Green and gold
- Nickname: Dragons
- Sporting affiliations: NCAA Division II - G-MAC
- Mascot: Blaze the Dragon
- Website: tiffin.edu

Tiffin University is a private university in Tiffin, Ohio, United States. It was founded in 1888.

== History ==
Founded in 1888 as Heidelberg’s Commercial College, Tiffin University evolved into Tiffin Business University in 1917 and became Tiffin University in 1939. Over the decades, TU expanded its academic offerings, launched signature programs in criminal justice and business, introduced online learning in 1999 and added graduate and doctoral degrees. Campus growth has included numerous academic, residential and athletic facilities, alongside a strong tradition of athletic success, including national championships. Today, Tiffin University continues to build on its legacy of innovation, growth and student-centered education.

== Academics ==
Tiffin University offers undergraduate and graduate degrees in various on-campus, off-campus, and online formats. Tiffin University consists of four academic schools: the School of Arts, Education, & Humanitites, the School of Business, the School of Criminal Justice & Social Sciences, and the School of Science, Technology, & Health. The Richard C. Pfeiffer Library houses a growing collection of books supporting the university's curriculum. The library is a member of OPAL and OhioLink, which provides online access to a vast collection of books, eBooks, and databases and books from any of the 90 other libraries. The average student-to-teacher ratio is 15:1.

As of 2024, the university enrolled about 3,831 students. It is accredited by the Higher Learning Commission.

== Campus life ==
Tiffin's main campus is 130 acres (52.6 ha) is located on the west side of Tiffin, within a half mile of downtown Tiffin.

=== Architecture ===
The campus environment includes over 25 buildings blending traditional historic and modern structures.

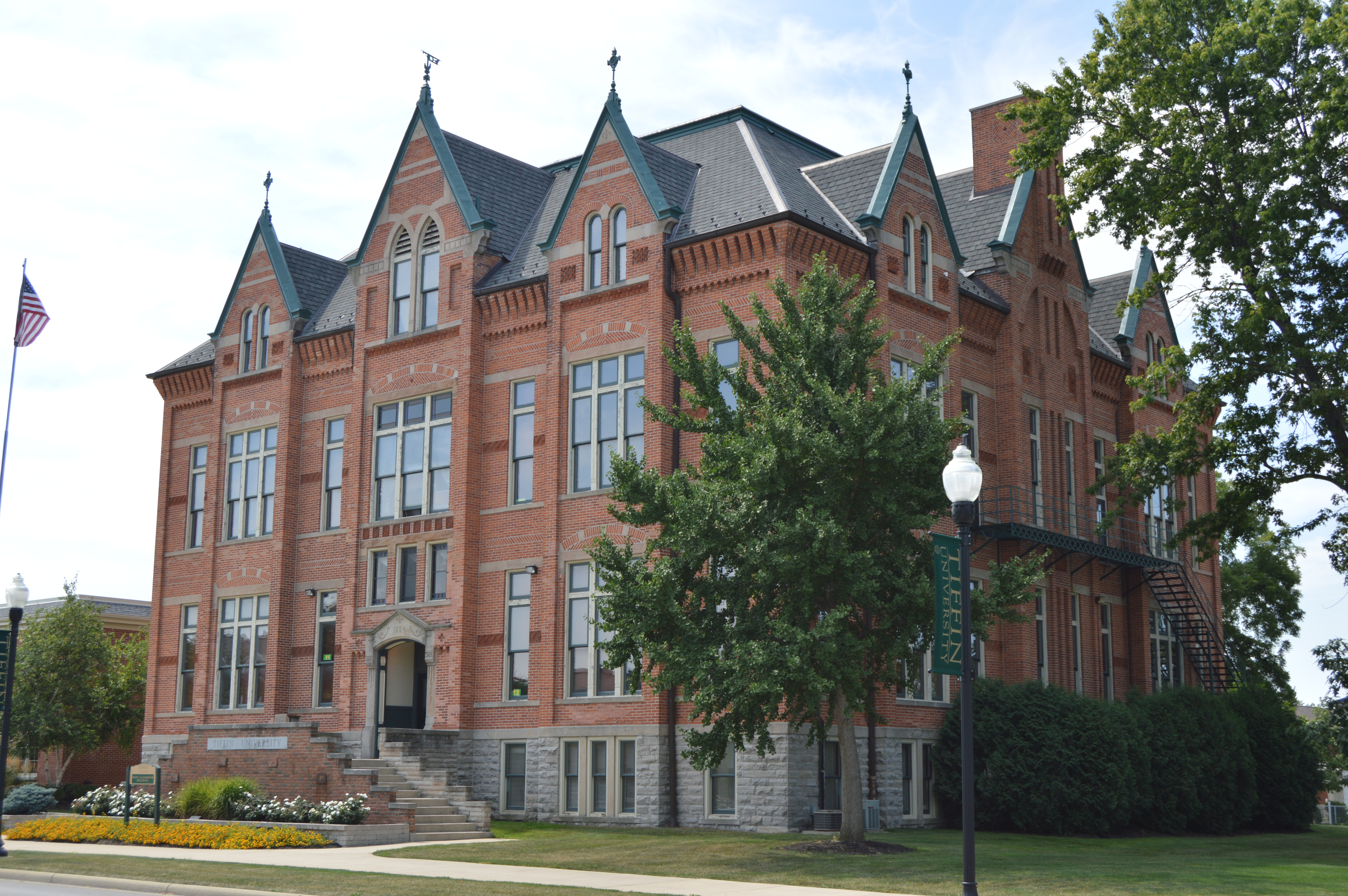
Main Classroom Building

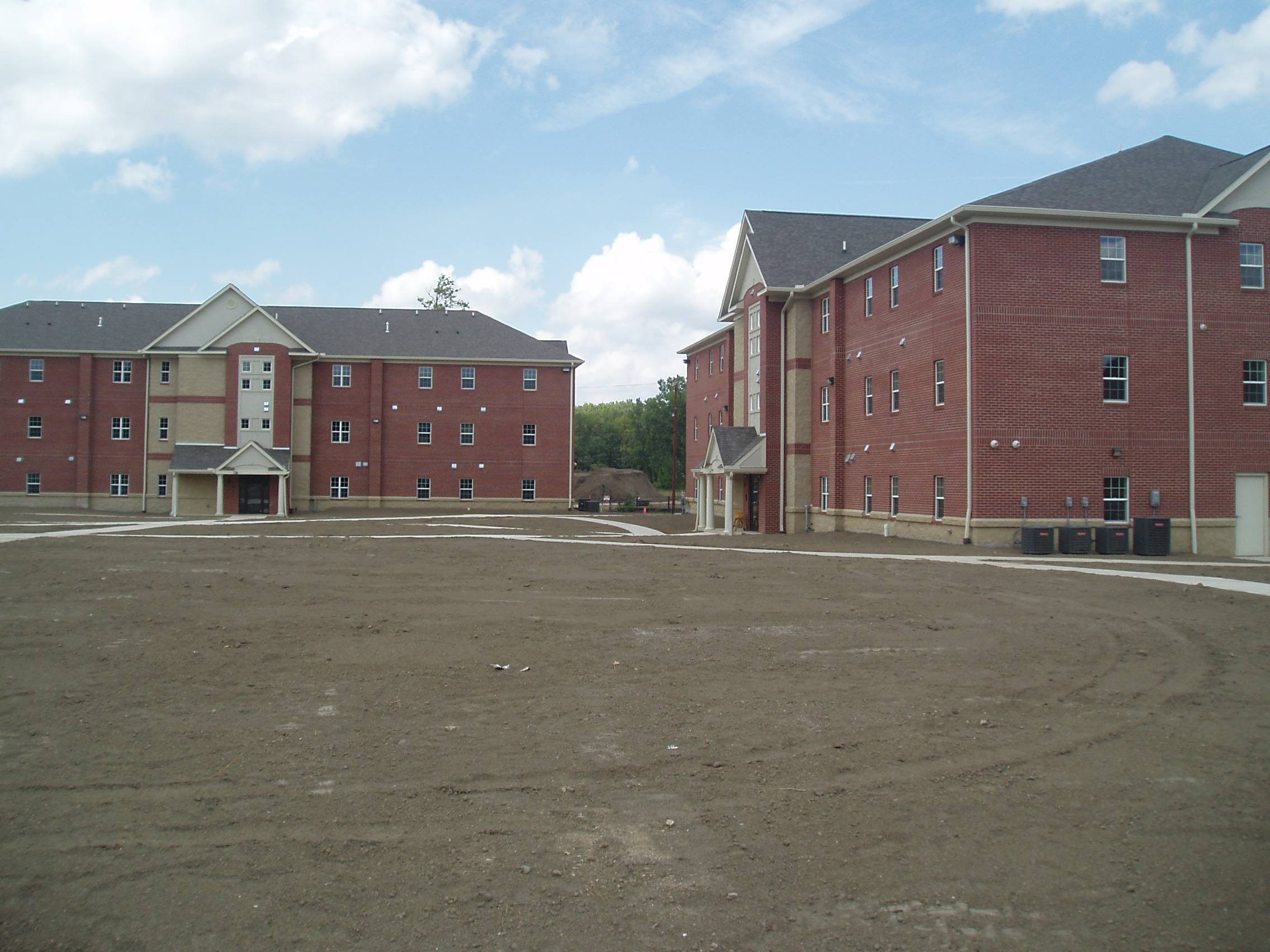
Complex

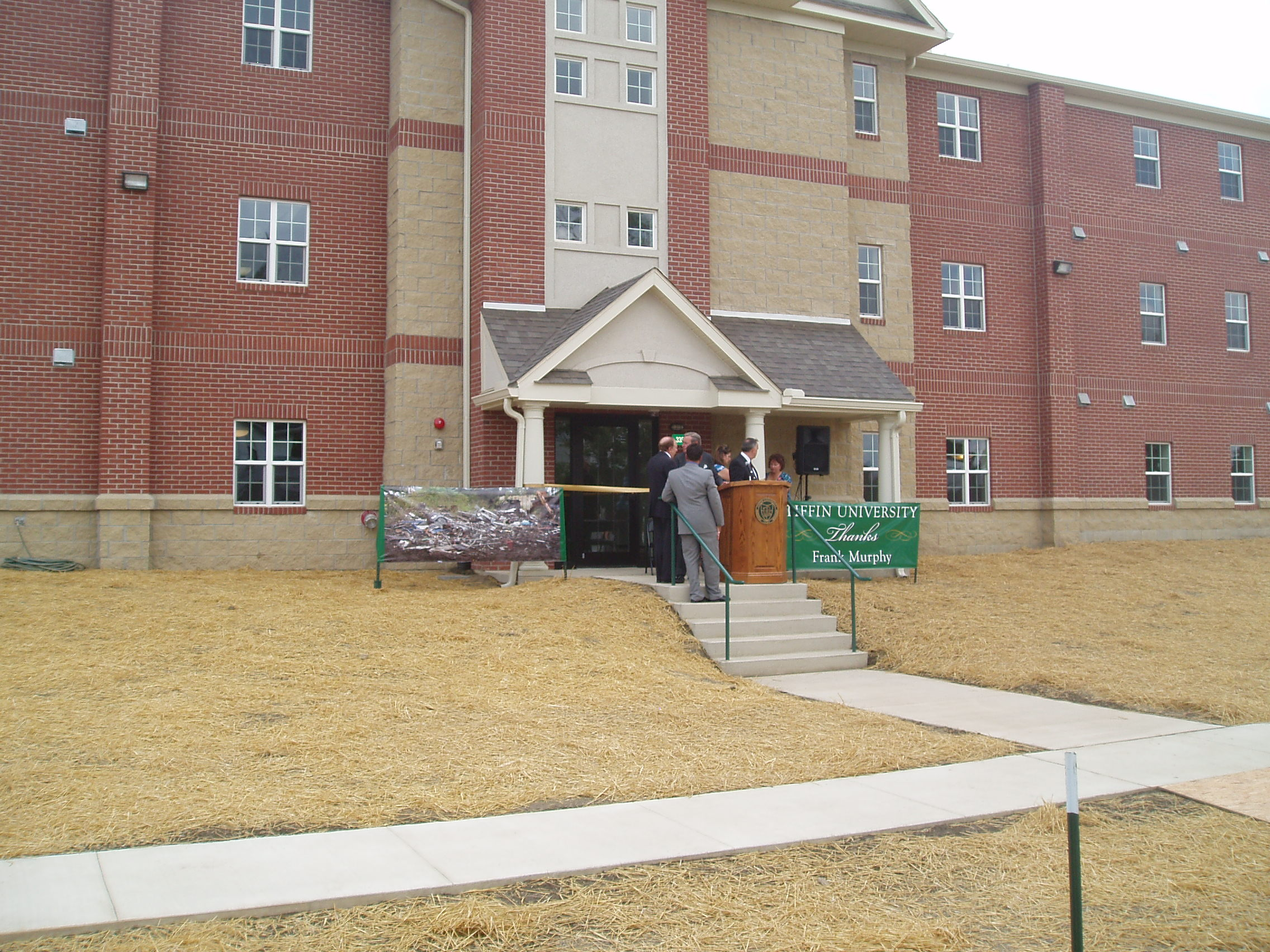
Frank Murphy building

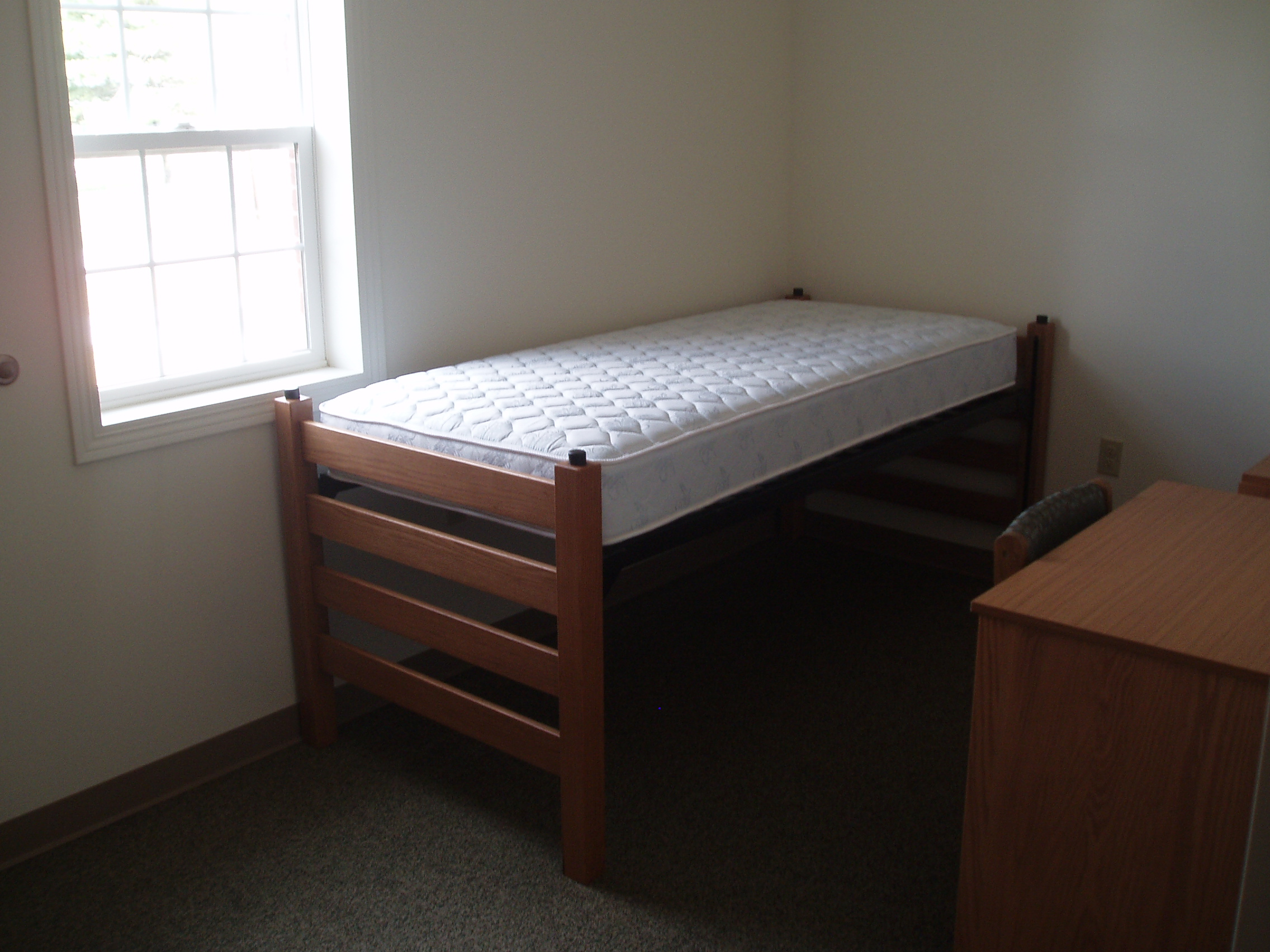
Residence hall bedroom

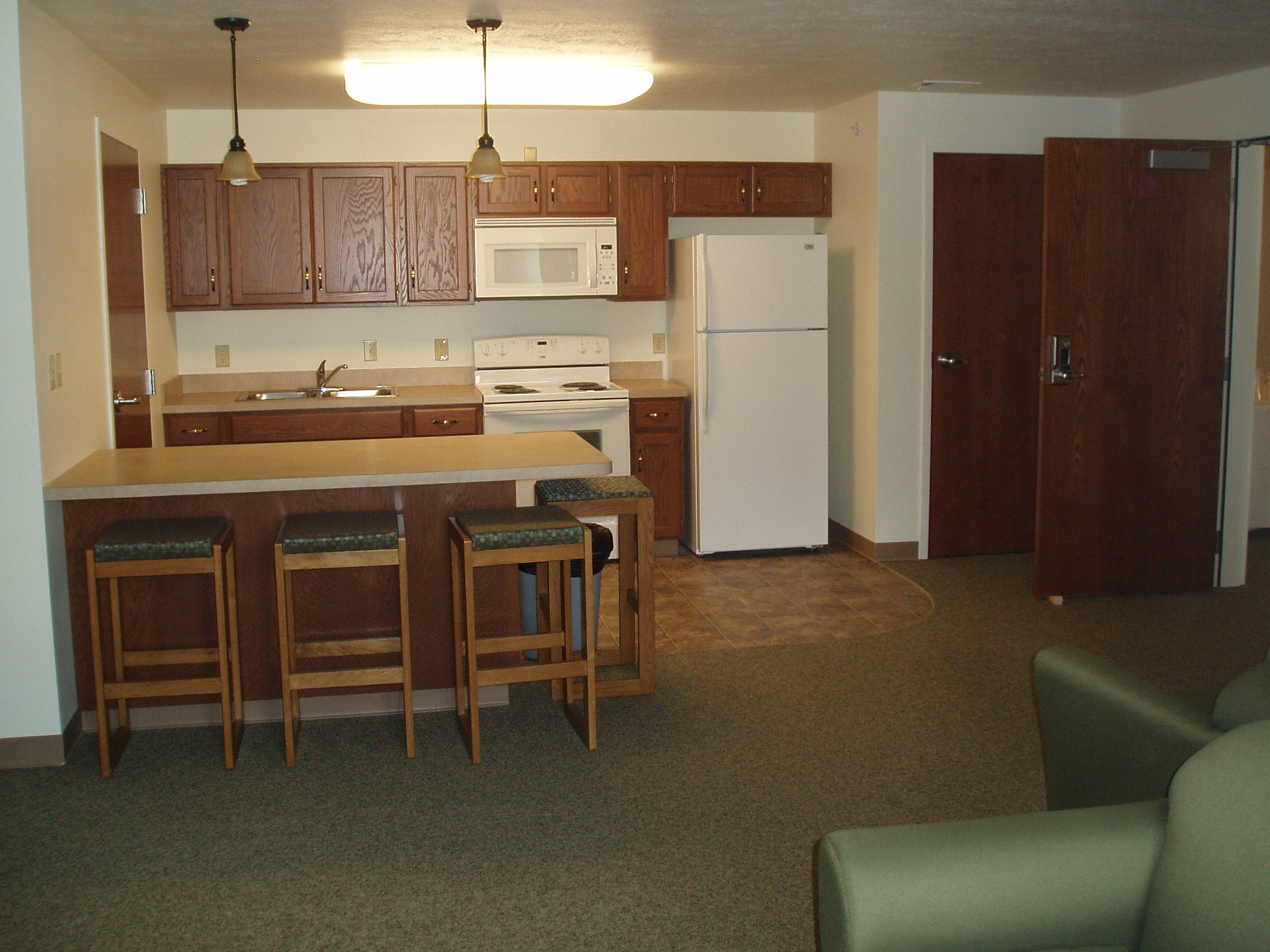
Residence hall kitchen

=== Greek life ===
Tiffin University's Greek life includes:

Fraternities	Sororities
Phi Theta Pi	Alpha Iota
Theta Eta Omicron	Zeta Pi Beta

== Athletics ==
The Tiffin Dragons compete in the Great Midwest Athletic Conference (G-MAC). The university has competitive teams in | baseball, basketball, cross country, esports, football, golf, lacrosse, soccer, softball, tennis, track and field, volleyball, and wrestling.

== Notable alumni ==
- Boris Bede, professional football player
- Rex Damschroder, member of Ohio House of Representatives
- Greg Freeman, professional football player
- Gary R. Heminger, president and CEO of Marathon Petroleum
- Chris Ivory, professional football player
- Walt Jean, professional football player
- Joe Macko, professional baseball player
- Jeffrey McClain, member of the Ohio House of Representatives
- Antonio Pipkin, professional football player
- David Singleton, basketball head coach of Indonesian Basketball League side, Prawira Bandung
- Nate Washington, professional football player
- George Whitfield, Jr., college and professional football coach
- Sandra Williams, member of the Ohio House of Representatives
