= Ohio Dominican Panthers =

College sport team in Ohio

- University: Ohio Dominican University
- Conference: Great Midwest Athletic Conference (2017-)
- NCAA: Division II
- Athletic director: Jeff Blair
- Location: Columbus, Ohio
- Varsity teams: 14 (7 men's, 7 women's)
- Football stadium: Panther Stadium
- Basketball arena: Alumni Hall
- Baseball stadium: Frank Damian Field
- Softball stadium: Panther Softball Field
- Nickname: Panthers
- Colors: Black and gold
- Website: ohiodominicanpanthers.com

The Ohio Dominican Panthers are the athletic teams that represent Ohio Dominican University, located in Columbus, Ohio, in NCAA Division II intercollegiate sporting competitions. The Panthers compete as members of the Great Midwest Athletic Conference beginning in 2017. Ohio Dominican joined the Great Lakes Intercollegiate Athletic Conference in 2010 as part of its transition to NCAA Division II from the National Association of Intercollegiate Athletics (NAIA).

== Varsity teams ==
Men's sports	Women's sports
Baseball	Basketball
Basketball	Cross country
Cross country	Golf
Football	Soccer
Golf	Softball
Soccer	Track and field
Track and field	Volleyball
