= Great Midwest Athletic Conference =

College athletic conference from 2011

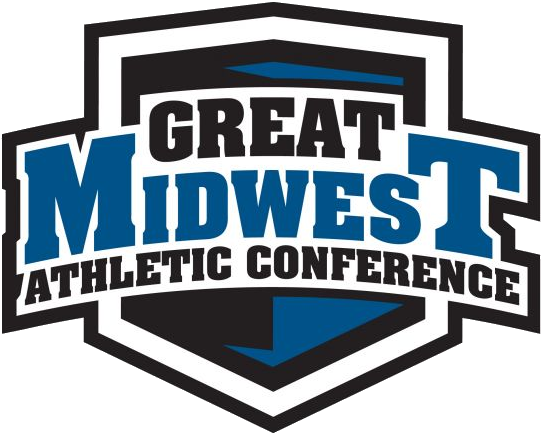
- Association: NCAA
- Founded: 2011 (began play in 2012)
- Commissioner: Tom Daeger (since 2011)
- Sports fielded: 25; men's: 12 (1 emerging); women's: 13
- Division: Division II
- No. of teams: 13 (14 in 2027)
- Headquarters: Indianapolis, Indiana
- Region: Great Lakes and East South Central
- Website: greatmidwestsports.com

Locations
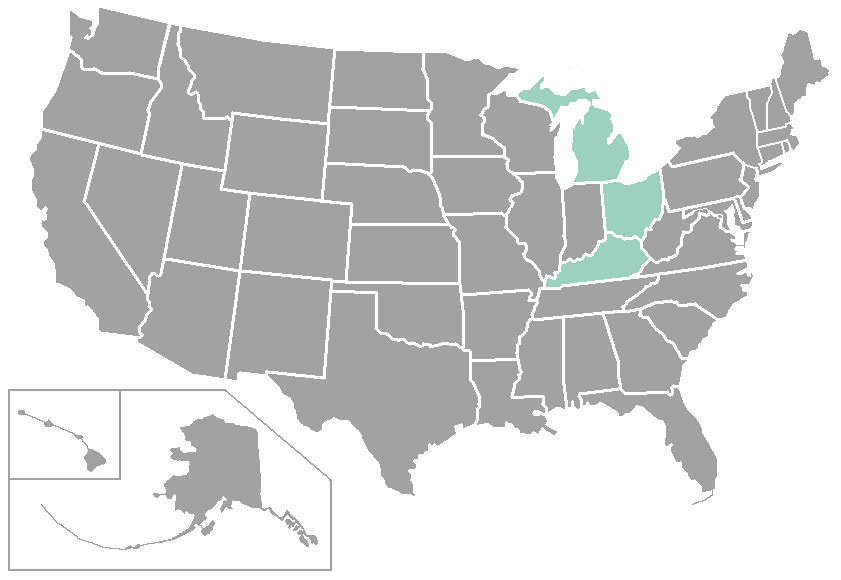

The Great Midwest Athletic Conference (G-MAC) is a college athletic conference affiliated with the National Collegiate Athletic Association (NCAA) at the Division II level. It was named the 24th (at the time) NCAA Division II conference and operates in the Great Lakes and East South Central States regions of the United States. The G-MAC began conference play in the 2012–13 academic year hosting 12 championships and continued to work through the educational assessment program. The conference received approval and became an active Division II conference in 2013–14, hosting 17 championships.

== History ==
Great Midwest Athletic Conference
Location of G-MAC members: full, affiliate, future, departing

The initial announcement of a potential new conference surfaced in June 2011 when the presidents and athletic directors of Cedarville University, Notre Dame College, Urbana University, and Ursuline College met to discuss plans for a new Division II conference.

Soon after the initial meeting, Central State University joined and became a fifth member. In October 2011, Kentucky Wesleyan College announced that the school will join the G-MAC, withdrawing from its current conference, the Great Lakes Valley Conference.

In November 2011, Trevecca Nazarene University was accepted as another charter member of the conference. Trevecca had begun the process of transitioning from NAIA to NCAA Division II membership in July, 2011 and entered a provisional NCAA membership year during the conference's initially planned start for the 2013–14 academic year. In late November, the conference announced the hiring of Tom Daeger as Conference Commissioner, with offices in Indianapolis.

On February 21, 2012, the Great Midwest Athletic Conference announced the NCAA had accepted the G-MAC as the 24th NCAA Division ll conference. The conference then added two more members when it was announced on April 23 and May 1, 2012, that the University of Virginia's College at Wise (UVA Wise) and Georgetown College had been granted provisional membership in the conference pending their approval by the NCAA Division II Membership Committee. Georgetown College was rejected for Division II membership, but applied to join Division II in 2014. However, they were denied acceptance once again by the Membership Council. As of 2021, Georgetown has made no further attempt to join Division II.

In the fall of 2012, it was announced that Urbana and UVA Wise would spend only one season as active members of the G-MAC. At the same time, the G-MAC announced that three West Virginia schools had accepted invitations to join the conference, starting in July 2013—Alderson Broaddus University, Davis & Elkins College, and Ohio Valley University. All three schools were previously members of the West Virginia Intercollegiate Athletic Conference (WVIAC), which disbanded after most of its football-sponsoring schools announced their departure for a new D-II league that eventually became the Mountain East Conference (MEC). On October 16, 2012, the G-MAC announced that Salem International University, since renamed Salem University, would join the conference on July 1, 2013. Salem would leave the G-MAC in 2016 to become a Division II independent.

On July 12, 2013, the Great Midwest Athletic Conference received official approval from the NCAA Division II Membership Committee, recognizing the Conference as an active NCAA Division II conference. On the same day, it was announced that Ursuline College had been approved as an active NCAA DII member and Trevecca Nazarene University successfully completed its Year Two candidacy and was moved into the Provisional Year of the membership process by the NCAA Division II Membership Committee.

On August 7, 2013, the Great Midwest Athletic Conference partnered with Cumberland University as it embarked on a transition to potential NCAA Division II membership. The G-MAC Presidents Council unanimously admitted Cumberland as a provisional member effective immediately and would have sponsored the institution as it worked through the NCAA Division II membership application process. In July 2014, Cumberland was denied acceptance into the NCAA by the Membership Council. As in the case of Georgetown, Cumberland has made no further attempt to join Division II.

On August 30, 2018, Davis & Elkins announced that it would reunite with most of its former WVIAC rivals in the Mountain East Conference after the 2018–19 school year. The school remains a G-MAC affiliate in men's lacrosse, a sport that the MEC does not sponsor.

On February 1, 2019, Malone announced that it had eliminated football and "remains committed to athletic competition in the NCAA Div. II and as members of the Great Midwest Athletic Conference (G-MAC)."

On May 19, 2020, Ashland University announced they would join the Great Midwest Athletic Conference from the Great Lakes Intercollegiate Athletic Conference for the 2021–22 school year. But a few months later, on August 4, 2020, its wrestling team would have the opportunity to compete for a G-MAC conference-sponsored championship a year ahead of schedule, effective immediately in the 2020–21 school year.

On June 5, 2020, another former WVIAC member, Alderson Broaddus, announced that it was leaving the G-MAC to join most of its old rivals in the Mountain East Conference for the 2020–21 school year.

On February 11, 2021, Ohio Valley announced that it would return to NAIA and join the River States Conference that July, and on April 29, Northwood University announced that it would also join the G-MAC from the GLIAC for the 2022–23 school year.

The G-MAC would gain a member later in 2021; on August 18, the conference and Thomas More University announced that the school, currently a member of the NAIA Mid-South Conference, would become a provisional G-MAC member in 2022. With G-MAC acceptance in hand, Thomas More applied to rejoin the NCAA and was officially accepted as a provisional D-II member on July 14, 2022. The school accordingly became a provisional G-MAC member, but continued to compete in the NAIA and in the Mid-South until July 2023.

Also for the 2021–22 season, G-MAC announced a partnership with Conference Carolinas to create a men's and women's bowling championship (even though men's bowling is not considered a varsity sport by the NCAA). Each conference will organize its regular season independently but the postseason will be called Conference Carolinas/Great Midwest Athletic Conference Men's and Women's Bowling Championships.

The most recently added sport is stunt, a women-only cheerleading discipline that emphasizes the acrobatic and technical aspects of cheerleading. It was added as an officially sanctioned sport for the 2022–23 school year, a year before it was added to the NCAA Emerging Sports for Women program in August 2023. The first season of conference competition featured four full G-MAC members and one affiliate.

In January 2025, G-MAC charter member Ursuline announced that it had agreed to be purchased by Gannon University, a Division II institution in Erie, Pennsylvania and a member of the Pennsylvania State Athletic Conference. When the merger takes full effect in December 2026, Ursuline will become Ursuline College Campus of Gannon University. The merger plan calls for the two campuses to maintain separate academic and athletic programs. The NCAA has approved the continued separate operation of the athletic programs. However, Ursuline contended that the G-MAC sent the school a letter in October 2025 stating that it would be expelled from the conference at the end of the 2026–27 school year. Gannon and Ursuline later responded with a joint lawsuit against the G-MAC challenging the alleged expulsion. The two sides would later reach an agreement to settle their lawsuit that would allow Ursuline to compete in the G-MAC through the 2027–28 school year, after which they would be removed from the conference.

=== Chronological timeline ===
- 2012 – The Great Midwest Athletic Conference (G-MAC) was founded. Charter members included Cedarville University, Central State University, Kentucky Wesleyan College, Trevecca Nazarene University, Urbana University, Ursuline College and the University of Virginia's College at Wise (UVA Wise), beginning the 2012–13 academic year.
- 2013
  - Urbana and UVA Wise left the G-MAC to join the newly created Mountain East Conference (MEC) after the 2012–13 academic year.
  - Alderson Broaddus University, Davis & Elkins College, Ohio Valley University and Salem University joined the G-MAC in the 2013–14 academic year.
- 2015 – Central State left the G-MAC to join the Southern Intercollegiate Athletic Conference (SIAC) after the 2014–15 academic year.
- 2016
  - Malone University joined the G-MAC in the 2016–17 academic year.
  - Lake Erie College, Mercyhurst University, Seton Hill University and Walsh University joined the G-MAC as affiliate members for men's lacrosse in the 2017 spring season (2016–17 academic year).
- 2017
  - The University of Findlay, Hillsdale College and Ohio Dominican University joined the G-MAC (along with Lake Erie and Walsh upgrading for all sports) in the 2017–18 academic year.
  - Wheeling Jesuit University (now Wheeling University) joined the G-MAC as an affiliate member for men's lacrosse in the 2018 spring season (2017–18 academic year).
- 2018 – Tiffin University joined the G-MAC in the 2018–19 academic year.
- 2019 – Davis & Elkins left the G-MAC to join the Mountain East after the 2018–19 academic year; while it remained for men's lacrosse beginning the 2020 spring season (2019–20 academic year).
- 2020
  - Alderson Broaddus left the G-MAC to join the Mountain East after the 2019–20 academic year; while it remained for men's lacrosse beginning the 2021 spring season (2020–21 academic year).
  - Ashland University joined the G-MAC as an affiliate member for men's wrestling in the 2020–21 academic year.
- 2021
  - Ohio Valley left the G-MAC and the NCAA to join the River States Conference (RSC) of the National Association of Intercollegiate Athletics (NAIA) after the 2020–21 academic year.
  - Ashland upgraded its G-MAC membership for all sports in the 2021–22 academic year.
- 2022
  - Northwood University and Thomas More University joined the G-MAC with the 2022–23 academic year. Although Thomas More joined the conference as a provisional member, it continued to compete in the NAIA and the Mid-South Conference in 2022–23 before beginning competition as a full G-MAC member in July 2023.
  - The G-MAC began conference competition in stunt in 2022–23 with four full members joined by new affiliate Hiram College.
- 2023
  - Alderson Broaddus left the G-MAC as an affiliate member for men's lacrosse after the 2023 spring season (2022–23 academic year) due to the closure of the school.
  - Mercyhurst, already a G-MAC affiliate in men's lacrosse, added stunt to its conference membership.
- 2024
  - Trevecca Nazarene left the G-MAC to join the Gulf South Conference (GSC) after the 2023–24 academic year.
  - Davenport University joined the G-MAC as an affiliate member for men's wrestling, men's lacrosse, and stunt, beginning the 2024–25 academic year.
  - Mercyhurst left the G-MAC as an affiliate member for men's lacrosse and stunt after the 2024 spring season (2023–24 academic year).
  - Hiram left the G-MAC as an affiliate member for stunt after the 2024 spring season (2023–24 academic year).
- 2025 – Point Park University joined the G-MAC as an affiliate member for men's lacrosse in the 2026 spring season (2025–26 academic year).
- 2026 – Roberts Wesleyan University joined the G-MAC as an affiliate member for men's and women's swimming & diving in the 2026–27 season.
- 2027 – The University of Indianapolis will join the G-MAC in the 2027–28 academic year.
- 2028 – Ursuline will be removed from the G-MAC following the 2027–28 academic year due to changes to its governance structure.

== Member schools ==
=== Current members ===
The G-MAC currently has 13 full members, all are private schools.

Institution	Location	Founded	Affiliation	Enrollment	Nickname	Joined (Note: Represents the calendar year when fall sports competition begins.)	Colors
Ashland University	Ashland, Ohio	1878	Brethren	6,433	Eagles	2021 (Note: Ashland competed in the G-MAC as an affiliate member for men's wrestling during the 2020–21 school year.)	
Cedarville University	Cedarville, Ohio	1887	Baptist	6,384	Yellow Jackets	2012	
University of Findlay	Findlay, Ohio	1882	Churches of God	5,057	Oilers	2017	
Hillsdale College	Hillsdale, Michigan	1844	Nonsectarian	1,573	Chargers	2017	
Kentucky Wesleyan College	Owensboro, Kentucky	1858	United Methodist	864	Panthers	2012 (Note: Kentucky Wesleyan joined the G-MAC in 2012 as a charter member for most sports, but did not begin competition until the 2013–14 school year because of its commitments to the final year of competition in the Great Lakes Valley Conference (GLVC).)	
Lake Erie College	Painesville, Ohio	1856	Nonsectarian	1,236	Storm	2017 (Note: Lake Erie and Walsh competed in the G-MAC as affiliate members for men's lacrosse during the 2017 spring season (2016–17 school year).)	
Malone University	Canton, Ohio	1892	Evangelical	1,268	Pioneers	2016	
Northwood University	Midland, Michigan	1959	Nonsectarian	2,227	Timberwolves	2022	
Ohio Dominican University	Columbus, Ohio	1911	Catholic	1,209	Panthers	2017	
Thomas More University	Crestview Hills, Kentucky	1921	Catholic	1,844	Saints	2022 (Note: Thomas More joined the G-MAC as a provisional member in July 2022 while still competing in the NAIA's Mid-South Conference (MSC); it began competition as a full G-MAC member in the 2023–24 school year.)	
Tiffin University	Tiffin, Ohio	1888	Nonsectarian	3,726	Dragons	2018	
Ursuline College	Pepper Pike, Ohio	1871	Catholic	970	Arrows	2012	
Walsh University	North Canton, Ohio	1960	Catholic	2,311	Cavaliers	2017	

=== Future members ===
Institution	Location	Founded	Affiliation	Enrollment	Nickname	Joining (Note: Represents the calendar year when fall sports competition begins.)	Colors	Current conference
University of Indianapolis (UIndy)	Indianapolis, Indiana	1902	United Methodist	5,638	Greyhounds	2027		Great Lakes Valley (GLVC)

=== Affiliate members ===
The G-MAC has six affiliate members, all are private schools:

Institution	Location	Founded	Affiliation	Enrollment	Nickname	Joined (Note: Represents the calendar year when fall sports competition begins.)	Colors	G-MAC sport(s)	Primary conference
Davenport University	Grand Rapids, Michigan	1866	Nonsectarian	4,848	Panthers	2024		men's lacrosse	Great Lakes (GLIAC)
Davenport University	Grand Rapids, Michigan	1866	Nonsectarian	4,848	Panthers	2024		men's wrestling	Great Lakes (GLIAC)
Davenport University	Grand Rapids, Michigan	1866	Nonsectarian	4,848	Panthers	2024		stunt	Great Lakes (GLIAC)
Davis & Elkins College	Elkins, West Virginia	1904	Presbyterian	683	Senators	2019 (Note: Davis & Elkins was a full G-MAC member from 2013–14 to 2018–19.)		men's lacrosse	Mountain East (MEC)
Point Park University	Pittsburgh, Pennsylvania	1960	Nonsectarian	3,448	Pioneers	2025		men's lacrosse	Mountain East (MEC)
Roberts Wesleyan University	Rochester, New York (Note: The Roberts Wesleyan campus has a Rochester mailing address, but is physically located in North Chili, New York.)	1866	Free Methodist	1,619	Redhawks	2026		men's swimming & diving	East Coast (ECC)
Roberts Wesleyan University	Rochester, New York	1866	Free Methodist	1,619	Redhawks	2026		women's swimming & diving	East Coast (ECC)
Seton Hill University	Greensburg, Pennsylvania	1883	Catholic	1,989	Griffins	2016		men's lacrosse	Pennsylvania (PSAC)
Wheeling University (Note: Formerly known as Wheeling Jesuit University until 2019.)	Wheeling, West Virginia	1954	Catholic	1,171	Cardinals	2017		men's lacrosse	Mountain East (MEC)

=== Former members ===
The G-MAC had eight former full members. All but two were private schools. School names and nicknames reflect those used during G-MAC membership:

Institution	Location	Founded	Affiliation	Enrollment	Nickname	Joined (Note: Represents the calendar year when fall sports competition begins.)	Left (Note: Represents the calendar year when spring sports competition ends.)	Current conference
Alderson Broaddus University	Philippi, West Virginia	1871	Baptist	N/A (Note: Prior to its closure, Alderson Broaddus had an enrollment of 2,306 students.)	Battlers	2013	2020 (Note: Alderson Broaddus maintained in the G-MAC as an affiliate member for men's lacrosse until after the 2023 spring season (2022–23 school year).)	Closed in 2023
Central State University	Wilberforce, Ohio	1887	Public	2,798	Marauders & Lady Marauders	2012	2015	Southern (SIAC)
Davis & Elkins College	Elkins, West Virginia	1904	Presbyterian	810	Senators	2013	2019 (Note: Davis & Elkins continues to maintain in the G-MAC as an affiliate member for men's lacrosse.)	Mountain East (MEC)
Ohio Valley University	Vienna, West Virginia	1960	Church of Christ	N/A	Fighting Scots	2013	2021	Closed in 2021 (Note: Ohio Valley joined the River States Conference of the National Association of Intercollegiate Athletics (NAIA) during the 2021–22 school year, but ceased operations at the end of the 2021 fall semester, without completing the rest of the 2021–22 school year.)
Salem International University (Note: Currently known as Salem University since 2017.)	Salem, West Virginia	1888	For-profit	835	Tigers	2013	2016	D-II Independent
Trevecca Nazarene University	Nashville, Tennessee	1901	Nazarene	3,327	Trojans	2012	2024	Gulf South (GSC)
Urbana University	Urbana, Ohio	1850	Nonsectarian	N/A	Blue Knights	2012	2013	Closed in 2020 (Note: Urbana discontinued its athletics program and closed the school after the 2019–20 school year.)
University of Virginia's College at Wise (Note: The athletic program is now branded as UVA Wise.)	Wise, Virginia	1954	Public	2,000	Highland Cavaliers (Note: UVA Wise dropped "Highland" from its athletic branding in 2017.)	2012	2013 (Note: UVA Wise joined the G-MAC in 2012 as a charter member for most sports, but was fulfilling its commitments to the final year of competition in the Mid-South Conference of the NAIA until the 2013–14 school year. However, UVA Wise was never a full member of the conference as it later announced to join the Mountain East Conference, effective that same school year.)	South Atlantic (SAC)

=== Former affiliate members ===
The G-MAC had three former affiliate members, all private schools. School names and nicknames reflect those used during G-MAC membership:

Institution	Location	Founded	Affiliation	Enrollment	Nickname	Joined (Note: Represents the calendar year when fall sports competition begins.)	Left (Note: Represents the calendar year when spring sports competition ends.)	Colors	G-MAC sport(s)	Primary conference
Alderson Broaddus University	Philippi, West Virginia	1871	Baptist	N/A (Note: Prior to its closure, Alderson Broaddus had an enrollment of 2,306 students.)	Battlers	2020 (Note: Alderson Broaddus was a full G-MAC member from 2013–14 to 2019–20.)	2023		men's lacrosse	Closed in 2023
Hiram College	Hiram, Ohio	1850	Disciples of Christ	1,395	Terriers	2022	2024		stunt	Presidents' (PAC) (Note: During its tenure in the G-MAC while competing as an affiliate member, Hiram's primary home conference was with the North Coast Athletic Conference (NCAC).) (Note: Currently an NCAA Division III athletic conference.)
Mercyhurst University	Erie, Pennsylvania	1926	Catholic	2,705	Lakers	2016	2024		men's lacrosse	Northeast (NEC) (Note: During its tenure in the G-MAC while competing as an affiliate member, Mercyhurst's primary home conference was with the Pennsylvania State Athletic Conference (PSAC).) (Note: Currently an NCAA Division I athletic conference.)
Mercyhurst University	Erie, Pennsylvania	1926	Catholic	2,705	Lakers	2023	2024		stunt	Northeast (NEC)

=== Membership timeline ===
Full member (all sports) Full member (non-football) Associate member (football) Associate member (sport)

== Sports ==
A three-divisional format is used for volleyball.
East
- Ashland
- Lake Erie
- Malone
- Ursuline
- Walsh
North
- Findlay
- Hillsdale
- Northwood
- Tiffin
South
- Cedarville
- Kentucky Wesleyan
- Ohio Dominican
- Thomas More
A two-divisional format is used for baseball.
North
- Ashland
- Findlay
- Hillsdale
- Lake Erie
- Northwood
- Tiffin
South
- Cedarville
- Kentucky Wesleyan
- Malone
- Ohio Dominican
- Thomas More
- Walsh

Sport	Men's	Women's
Baseball	✓	
Basketball	✓	✓
Bowling		✓
Cross country	✓	✓
Football	✓	
Golf	✓	✓
Lacrosse	✓	✓
Soccer	✓	✓
Softball		✓
Stunt		✓
Swimming & diving	✓	✓
Tennis	✓	✓
Track & field indoor	✓	✓
Track & field outdoor	✓	✓
Volleyball		✓
Wrestling	✓	

In swimming and diving for both sexes, the G-MAC and Mountain East Conference operate as a single league, conducting a combined conference championship meet.

In bowling, Great Midwest Athletic Conference and Conference Carolinas made a partnership to make a men's and women's bowling championship (even though men's bowling is not considered a varsity sport by the NCAA). Each conference will organize its regular season independently but the postseason will be called Conference Carolinas/Great Midwest Athletic Conference Men's and Women's Bowling Championships.

=== Men's sponsored sports by school ===
School	Baseball	Basketball	Cross country	Football	Golf	Lacrosse	Soccer	Swimming & diving	Tennis	Track & field indoor	Track & field outdoor	Wrestling	Total GMAC sports
Ashland	✓	✓	✓	✓	✓		✓	✓	✓	✓	✓	✓	11
Cedarville	✓	✓	✓		✓		✓		✓	✓	✓		8
Findlay	✓	✓	✓	✓	✓		✓	✓	✓	✓	✓	✓	11
Hillsdale	✓	✓	✓	✓	✓				✓	✓	✓		8
Kentucky Wesleyan	✓	✓	✓	✓	✓		✓			✓	✓	✓	9
Lake Erie	✓	✓	✓	✓		✓	✓			✓	✓	✓	9
Malone	✓	✓	✓		✓	✓	✓	✓		✓	✓		8
Northwood	✓	✓	✓	✓	✓	✓	✓		✓	✓	✓		10
Ohio Dominican	✓	✓	✓	✓	✓		✓			✓	✓		8
Thomas More	✓	✓	✓	✓	✓	✓	✓		✓		✓		9
Tiffin	✓	✓	✓	✓	✓	✓	✓		✓	✓	✓	✓	10
Ursuline		(Note: Ursuline will add men's basketball in 2027–28.)	✓		✓					✓	✓		4
Walsh	✓	✓	✓	✓	✓	✓	✓	✓	✓	✓	✓		11
Totals	12	12	13	10	12	6+5 (Note: Affiliate members Davenport, Davis & Elkins, Point Park, Seton Hill, and Wheeling.)	11	4+1 (Note: Affiliate member Roberts Wesleyan.)	8	12	13	5+1 (Note: Affiliate member Davenport.)	116+7
Future Members
Indianapolis	✓	✓	✓	✓	✓	✓	✓	✓	✓	✓	✓	✓	12

=== Women's sponsored sports by school ===
School	Basketball	Bowling (Note: De facto Division I sport through 2026–27, with the NCAA championship tournament currently open to schools in all three divisions. Starting in 2027–28, Division II will have its own NCAA championship.)	Cross country	Golf	Lacrosse	Soccer	Softball	Stunt (Note: De facto Division I sport that graduated from the NCAA Emerging Sports for Women program in January 2026, with the first NCAA championship to be held in 2026–27. The 2025–26 national championship is operated by USA Cheer.)	Swimming & diving	Tennis	Track & field indoor	Track & field outdoor	Volleyball	Total GMAC sports
Ashland	✓		✓	✓	✓	✓	✓	✓	✓	✓	✓	✓	✓	12
Cedarville	✓		✓			✓	✓			✓	✓	✓	✓	8
Findlay	✓		✓	✓	✓	✓	✓		✓	✓	✓	✓	✓	11
Hillsdale	✓		✓				✓		✓	✓	✓	✓	✓	8
Kentucky Wesleyan	✓		✓	✓		✓	✓			✓	✓	✓	✓	9
Lake Erie	✓		✓		✓	✓	✓				✓	✓	✓	8
Malone	✓		✓	✓	✓	✓	✓	✓	✓		✓	✓	✓	10
Northwood	✓		✓	✓	✓	✓	✓			✓	✓	✓	✓	10
Ohio Dominican	✓		✓	✓		✓	✓				✓	✓	✓	8
Thomas More	✓	✓	✓	✓	✓	✓	✓			✓		✓	✓	10
Tiffin	✓		✓	✓	✓	✓	✓	✓		✓	✓	✓	✓	11
Ursuline	✓	✓	✓	✓	✓	✓	✓	✓		✓	✓	✓	✓	13
Walsh	✓	✓	✓	✓	✓	✓	✓	✓	✓	✓	✓	✓	✓	13
Totals	13	3	13	10	9	12	13	5+1 (Note: Affiliate member Davenport.)	5+1 (Note: Affiliate member Roberts Wesleyan.)	10	12	13	13	131+2
Future Members
Indianapolis	✓	✓	✓	✓	✓	✓	✓		✓	✓	✓	✓	✓	12

=== Other sponsored sports by school ===
School	Men	Women
School	Volleyball (Note: De facto Division I sport. The NCAA conducts a national championship tournament open to schools in Divisions I and II.)	Wrestling (Note: De facto Division I sport. Through 2026–27, the NCAA is conducting a national championship meet open to schools in all divisions. After that time, Division III will have a separate championship.)
Thomas More	GLVC (Note: Thomas More dropped men's volleyball at the end of the spring 2026 season.)	
Tiffin	–	Independent

Notes

In addition to the above:

- Thomas More sponsors varsity teams in the following non-NCAA sports: archery, men's bowling, and men's rugby. It also considers its band, cheerleaders (male and female) and dance team (all-female) to be varsity athletes.
