= List of NCAA Division II basketball arenas =

This is a list of arenas that currently serve as the home venue for NCAA Division II college basketball teams. The arenas serve as home venues for both the men's and women's teams except where noted. In addition, venues which are not located on campus or are used infrequently during the season have been listed.

Official changes for new Division II teams and for teams moving conferences are official as of July 1 prior to the academic year.

Arena capacities for certain schools, particularly those of the CIAA, GLVC, Northeast-10, and SIAC conferences, are sometimes gathered from their corresponding conference's Wikipedia page and may not always be present in attached sources if the source does not include a number.

== Current arenas ==
Image	Arena	City	State/Province	Team	Conference	Capacity	Opened
	Harvey Hubbell Gymnasium	Bridgeport	CT	Bridgeport Purple Knights	CACC	1,600	1967
	George R. Newman Center	Caldwell	NJ	Caldwell Cougars	CACC	1,800	2002
	Ann Rusnack Sorgenti Arena	Philadelphia	PA	Chestnut Hill Griffins	CACC	450	2000
	Hennessy Center	Orangeburg	NY	Dominican Chargers	CACC	1,000	1994
	Joseph & Joal Job Gymnasium	Rutherford	NJ	Felician Golden Falcons	CACC	550	
	Wellness Center Arena	Lakewood	NJ	Georgian Court Lions	CACC	1,200	2008
	Joseph West Jones Center	Wilmington	DE	Goldey–Beacom Lightning	CACC	1,000	1998
	Campus Center Gymnasium	Philadelphia	PA	Holy Family Tigers	CACC	1,000	1988
	Drubner Center	Waterbury	CT	Post Eagles	CACC	300	1986
	Gallagher Center	Philadelphia	PA	Thomas Jefferson Rams	CACC	1,266	2006
	Wilmington University Athletics Complex	New Castle	DE	Wilmington Wildcats	CACC	400	2013
	Wilson Gymnasium	Wilson	NC	Barton Bulldogs	Carolinas		
	Wheeler Center	Belmont	NC	Belmont Abbey Cruscaders	Carolinas		1969
	Hawks Athletic Center	Murfreesboro	NC	Chowan Hawks	Carolinas	2,000	1977
	Weisiger Center	Spartanburg	SC	Converse Valkyries	Carolinas		2001
	Shaw Athletic Center	Franklin Springs	GA	Emmanuel Lions	Carolinas		2012
	Belk Arena	Due West	SC	Erskine Flying Fleet	Carolinas	1,800	1981
	Swartz Gymnasium	Ferrum	VA	Ferrum Panthers	Carolinas	800	1962
	Smith University Center	Florence	SC	Francis Marion Patriots	Carolinas	2,547	1974
	Student Center Complex	Bristol	TN	King Tornado	Carolinas		2003
	Williams Gymnasium	Banner Elk	NC	Lees–McRae Bobcats	Carolinas		1976
	Kornegay Arena	Mount Olive	NC	Mount Olive Trojans	Carolinas	2,500	1984
	Hayes Gymnasium	Tigerville	SC	North Greenville Trailblazers	Carolinas		1950
	Winthrop-King Centre	Rome	GA	Shorter Hawks	Carolinas	1,500	1993
	Historic Tysinger Gymnasium	Central	SC	Southern Wesleyan Warriors	Carolinas	520	1969
	Lumbee Guaranty Bank Court	Pembroke	NC	UNC Pembroke Braves	Carolinas		
	The Harp Recreation and Commencement Center	Young Harris	GA	Young Harris Mountain Lions	Carolinas	1,100	2010
	Lumberjack Arena	Arcata	CA	Cal Poly Humboldt Lumberjacks	CCAA	1,850	2008
	Kellogg Arena	Pomona	CA	Cal Poly Pomona Broncos	CCAA	3,000	1968
	Art Acker Gymnasium	Chico	CA	Cal State Chico Wildcats	CCAA	2,143	N/A (1960s)
	Torodome	Carson	CA	Cal State Dominguez Hills Toros	CCAA	2,802	1970
	Pioneer Gymnasium	Hayward	CA	Cal State East Bay Pioneers	CCAA	~2,500	1967
	University Gym	Los Angeles	CA	Cal State Los Angeles Golden Eagles	CCAA	2,654	
	The Kelp Bed	Seaside	CA	Cal State Monterey Bay Otters	CCAA		
	Coussoulis Arena	San Bernardino	CA	Cal State San Bernardino Coyotes	CCAA	4,150	1995
	The Sports Center	San Marcos	CA	Cal State San Marcos Cougars	CCAA	1,400	2016
	Ed & Bertha Fitzpatrick Arena	Turlock	CA	Cal State Stanislaus Warriors	CCAA	2,000	1978
	Special Events Center	Fresno	CA	Fresno Pacific Sunbirds	CCAA	1,600	1981
	Haynes-Prim Pavilion	Atherton	CA	Menlo Oaks	CCAA	600	N/A (1970s)
	Main Gym at Don Nasser Family Plaza	San Francisco	CA	San Francisco State Gators	CCAA		
	Greg and Cathie Hostetler Court	Merced	CA	UC Merced Golden Bobcats	CCAA	600	
	Ned E. Shott Gym	Bluefield	WV	Bluefield State Big Blue	CIAA	1,500	
	A. C. Jordan Arena	Bowie	MD	Bowie State Bulldogs	CIAA	2,200	1973
	Edward Tullis Arena	Orangeburg	SC	Claflin Panthers	CIAA	3,000	
	R. L. Vaughan Center	Elizabeth City	NC	Elizabeth City State Vikings	CIAA	5,000	1976
	Felton J. Capel Arena	Fayetteville	NC	Fayetteville State Broncos and Lady Broncos	CIAA	4,000	1995
	Brayboy Gymnasium	Charlotte	NC	Johnson C. Smith Golden Bulls	CIAA	1,360	
	Manuel Rivero Hall	Oxford	PA	Lincoln Lions	CIAA	2,500	1973
	New Trent Gymnasium	Salisbury	NC	Livingstone Blue Bears	CIAA	1,500	
	Emery Gymnasium	Raleigh	NC	St. Augustine's Falcons	CIAA	1,000	
	C. C. Spaulding Gym	Raleigh	NC	Shaw Bears	CIAA	1,500	
	VSU Multi-Purpose Center	Ettrick	VA	Virginia State Trojans	CIAA	5,100	2016
	Barco-Stevens Hall	Richmond	VA	Virginia Union Panthers	CIAA	>2,000	1946
	C. E. Gaines Center	Winston-Salem	NC	Winston-Salem State Rams	CIAA	2,750	1981
	Lumsden Gymnasium	Amherst	NY	Daemen Wildcats	ECC	1,000	
	UDC Gymnasium	Washington	DC	District of Columbia Firebirds	ECC	1,500	
	College Center Gym	Buffalo	NY	D'Youville Saints	ECC	550	1969
	Neil Judge Student Athlete Center	Dobbs Ferry	NY	Mercy Mavericks	ECC		
	Quealy Gymnasium	Rockville Centre	NY	Molloy Lions	ECC		
	South Gym	Flushing	NY	Queens Knights	ECC	1,200	
	Voller Athletic Center	Rochester	NY	Roberts Wesleyan Redhawks	ECC		1986
	Aquinas Hall Gym	Sparkill	NY	St. Thomas Aquinas Spartans	ECC		
	Sports & Recreation Center	Staten Island	NY	Staten Island Dolphins	ECC	1,200	
	Tucker Coliseum	Russellville	AR	Arkansas Tech Wonder Boys and Golden Suns	GAC	3,500	1976
	Steelman Field House	Monticello	AR	Arkansas–Monticello Boll Weevils and Cotton Blossoms	GAC	2,000	
	Kerr Activities Center	Ada	OK	East Central Tigers	GAC	3,280	1973
	Rhodes-Reaves Field House	Searcy	AR	Harding Bisons	GAC	3,000	1957
	Duke Wells Center	Arkadelphia	AR	Henderson State Reddies	GAC	>3,000	1971
	Percefull Fieldhouse	Alva	OK	Northwestern Oklahoma State Rangers	GAC	2,100	1953
	Noble Complex	Shawnee	OK	Oklahoma Baptist Bison	GAC	2,400	1982
	Bill Vining Arena	Arkadelphia	AR	Ouachita Baptist Tigers	GAC	2,400	1997
	Bloomer Sullivan Arena	Durant	OK	Southeastern Oklahoma State Savage Storm	GAC	3,000	2008
	W. T. Watson Athletic Center	Magnolia	AR	Southern Arkansas Muleriders	GAC	2,500	
	Sawyer Center	Bethany	OK	Southern Nazarene Crimson Storm	GAC	5,000	1999
	Pioneer Cellular Event Center	Weatherford	OK	Southwestern Oklahoma State Bulldogs	GAC	4,000	2014
	Student Center	Grand Rapids	MI	Davenport Panthers	GLIAC	1,500	2008
	Jim Wink Arena	Big Rapids	MI	Ferris State Bulldogs	GLIAC	2,400	1999
	GVSU Fieldhouse	Allendale	MI	Grand Valley State Lakers	GLIAC	4,200	1982
	Bud Cooper Gymnasium	Sault Ste. Marie	MI	Lake Superior State Lakers	GLIAC	2,500	1976
	Student Development Complex Gymnasium	Houghton	MI	Michigan Tech Huskies	GLIAC	3,200	1980
	Vandament Arena	Marquette	MI	Northern Michigan Wildcats	GLIAC	3,000	2024
	John Friend Court	Hammond	IN	Purdue Northwest Pride	GLIAC		
	Goodman Center	Chicago	IL	Roosevelt Lakers	GLIAC	500	2012
	James E. O'Neill Jr. Arena	University Center	MI	Saginaw Valley State Cardinals	GLIAC	3,600	
	Wayne State Fieldhouse	Detroit	MI	Wayne State University Warriors	GLIAC	3,000	2021
	De Simone Arena	Somers	WI	Wisconsin-Parkside Rangers	GLIAC	2,120	
	O'Reilly Family Event Center	Springfield	MO	Drury Panthers	GLVC	2,850	2010
	Nicoson Hall	Indianapolis	IN	Indianapolis Greyhounds	GLVC	4,000	1959
	Neil Carey Arena	Romeoville	IL	Lewis Flyers	GLVC	1,100	
	Jason Gymnasium	Jefferson City	MO	Lincoln Blue Tigers	GLVC	1,900	1958
	Moloney Arena	Town and Country	MO	Maryville Saints	GLVC	2,000	
	Melvin Price Convocation Canter	Lebanon	IL	McKendree Bearcats	GLVC	1,600	1988
	Gibson Arena	Rolla	MO	Missouri S&T Miners	GLVC	4,000	
	Pepsi Arena	Quincy	IL	Quincy Hawks	GLVC	2,000	1950
	Mason–Halpin Field House	Kansas City	MO	Rockhurst Hawks	GLVC	3,100	1938
	John Q. Hammons Court	Bolivar	MO	Southwest Baptist Bearcats	GLVC	2,925	2004
	Pershing Arena	Kirksville	MO	Truman Bulldogs	GLVC	>2,300	1957
	The Recreation and Athletic Canter	Springfield	IL	UIS Prairie Stars	GLVC	3,000	
	Mark Twain Building	St. Louis	MO	UMSL Tritons	GLVC	3,700	1971
	Dorman Memorial Gymnasium	Fayette	IA	Upper Iowa Peacocks	GLVC	1,338	1963
	Mabee Canter	Liberty	MO	William Jewell Cardinals	GLVC	2,400	1980
	Kates Gymnasium	Ashland	OH	Ashland Eagles	G-MAC	2,000	1967
	Callan Athletic Center	Cedarville	OH	Cedarville Yellow Jackets	G-MAC	3,000	1981
	Niekamp Arena	Findlay	OH	Findlay Oilers	G-MAC		1970
	Dawn Tibbetts Potter Arena	Hillsdale	MI	Hillsdale Chargers	G-MAC	2,500	1988
	Owensboro Sportscenter	Owensboro	KY	Kentucky Wesleyan Panthers	G-MAC	5,002	1949
	Osborne Center	Painesville	OH	Lake Erie Storm	G-MAC	750	2004
	Osborne Hall	Canton	OH	Malone Pioneers	G-MAC	1,200	1960
	Riepma Arena	Midland	MI	Northwood Timberwolves	G-MAC	2,500	
	Alumni Hall	Columbus	OH	Ohio Dominican Panthers	G-MAC	2,000	1989
	Connor Convocation Center	Crestview Hills	KY	Thomas More Saints	G-MAC	1,200	1989
	Gillmor Student Center	Tiffin	OH	Tiffin Dragons	G-MAC		1988
	Seidman Gymnasium	Pepper Pike	OH	Ursuline Arrows	G-MAC	1,000	2015
	Cecchini Center	Canton	OH	Walsh Cavaliers	G-MAC	2,000	
	Alaska Airlines Gymnasium	Fairbanks	AK	Alaska Nanooks	GNAC	1,648	
	Alaska Airlines Center	Anchorage	AK	Alaska Anchorage Seawolves	GNAC	5,000	2014
	Nicholson Pavilion	Ellensburg	WA	Central Washington Wildcats	GNAC	2,519	1959
	Alterowitz Gymnasium	Billings	MT	MSUB Yellowjackets	GNAC	2,330	
	Johnson Sports Center	Nampa	ID	Northwest Nazarene Nighthawks	GNAC	3,500	
	Marcus Pavilion	Lacey	WA	Saint Martin's Saints	GNAC	4,300	
	Royal Brougham Pavilion	Seattle	WA	Seattle Pacific Falcons	GNAC	2,650	
	SFU West Gym	Burnaby	BC	Simon Fraser Red Leafs	GNAC	1,500	
	Physical Education Building	Monmouth	OR	Western Oregon Wolves	GNAC	2,473	1971
	Sam Carver Gymnasium	Bellingham	WA	Western Washington Vikings	GNAC	2,534	1962
	Spragins Hall	Huntsville	AL	Alabama–Huntsville Chargers	GSC	2,500	1977
	AUM Athletics Complex	Montgomery	AL	Auburn Montgomery Warhawks	GSC	2,670	1976
	Canale Arena	Memphis	TN	Christian Brothers Buccaneers	GSC	1,000	1950
	Walter Sillers Coliseum	Cleveland	MS	Delta State Statesmen and Lady Statesmen	GSC	3,000	1961
	Paul Dana Walker Arena	Cleveland	TN	Lee Flames	GSC	2,000	1983
	A. E. Wood Coliseum	Clinton	MS	Mississippi Christian Choctaws	GSC	3,500	1977
	McChesney Student Activity Center	Montevallo	AL	Montevallo Falcons	GSC	2,000	2004
	Trojan Fieldhouse	Nashville	TN	Trevecca Nazarene Trojans	GSC	1,500	
	Fred DeLay Gymnasium	Jackson	TN	Union Bulldogs	GSC	1,823	1975
	The Complex	Valdosta	GA	Valdosta State Blazers	GSC	5,350	1982
	Pruitt Hall Gymnasium	Livingston	AL	West Alabama Tigers	GSC	1,500	
	Coliseo Rubén Rodríguez	Bayamón	PR	Puerto-Rico-Bayamón Cowboys	Independent	12,000	1988
	Rafael A. Mangual Coliseum	Mayagüez	PR	Puerto Rico-Mayagüez Bulldogs	Independent	5,500	1974
	UPR Sports Complex	San Juan	PR	Puerto Rico-Río Piedras Gallitos & Jerezanas	Independent		
	T. Edward Davis Gymnasium	Salem	WV	Salem Tigers	Independent		
	Stephens Arena	San Angelo	TX	Angelo State Rams and Rambelles	LSC	4,970	2001
	Aggie Gym	Lawton	OK	Cameron Aggies	LSC	1,500	1957
	Burg Center	Dallas	TX	Dallas Baptist Patriots	LSC	1,600	
	Greyhound Arena	Portales	NM	Eastern New Mexico Greyhounds	LSC	4,800	1967
	Rip Griffin Center	Lubbock	TX	Lubbock Christian Chaparrals and Lady Chaparrals	LSC	1,950	2000
	D.L. Ligon Coliseum	Wichita Falls	TX	Midwestern State Mustangs	LSC	3,640	
	Payne Athletic Center	Edmond	OK	Oklahoma Christian Eagles and Lady Eagles	LSC	2,100	1970
	Recreation and Athletics Center	Austin	TX	St. Edward's Hilltoppers	LSC	1,300	1987
	Bill Greehey Arena	San Antonio	TX	St. Mary's Rattlers	LSC	3,800	2000
	Pete P. Gallego Center	Alpine	TX	Sul Ross State Lobos	LSC	3,200	
	TAMIU Kinesiology and Convocation Building	Laredo	TX	Texas A&M International Dustdevils	LSC	1,800	1998
	Gil H. Steinke Physical Education Center	Kingsville	TX	Texas A&M–Kingsville Javelinas	LSC	4,000	1970
	Kitty Magee Arena	Denton	TX	Texas Woman's Pioneers	LSC	1,800	1997
	UT Dallas Activity Center	Richardson	TX	UT Dallas Comets	LSC	3,200	1999
	Falcon Dome	Odessa	TX	UT Permian Basin Falcons	LSC		
	Louise Herrington Patriot Center	Tyler	TX	UT Tyler Patriots	LSC	2,000	
	First United Bank Center	Canyon	TX	West Texas A&M Buffaloes	LSC	4,700	2002
	Drag's Court	Silver City	NM	Western New Mexico Mustangs	LSC	4,800	1967
	Wehrle Innovation Center	Charleston	WV	Charleston Golden Eagles	MEC	1,589	2016
	Carter Center	Athens	WV	Concord Mountain Lions	MEC		
	McDonnell Center	Elkins	WV	Davis & Elkins Senators	MEC	1,200	2005
	Joe Retton Arena	Fairmont	WV	Fairmont State Fighting Falcons	MEC	2,711	1978
	Bobcat Arena	Frostburg	MD	Frostburg State Bobcats	MEC	4,000	
	Waco Center	Glenville	WV	Glenville State Pioneers	MEC	3,000	2014
	CCAC Physical Education Building	Pittsburgh	PA	Point Park Pioneers	MEC	>1,000	
	Waller Gymnasium	Portsmouth	OH	Shawnee State Bears	MEC	1,040	1983
	Academic, Sports and Recreation Complex	West Liberty	WV	West Liberty Hilltoppers	MEC	1,200	2000
	Walker Convocation Center	Institute	WV	West Virginia State Yellow Jackets	MEC	1,350	2014
	Rockefeller Center	Buckhannon	WV	West Virginia Wesleyan Bobcats	MEC		
	Alma Grace McDonough Center	Wheeling	WV	Wheeling Cardinals	MEC	2,200	1994
	Jerry M. Hughes Athletics Center	Warrensburg	MO	Central Missouri Mules and Jennies	MIAA	6,500	1976
	Hamilton Field House	Edmond	OK	Central Oklahoma Bronchos	MIAA	3,000	1965
	William L. White Auditorium	Emporia	KS	Emporia State Hornets	MIAA	5,000	1941
	Gross Memorial Coliseum	Hays	KS	Fort Hays State Tigers	MIAA	6,814	1973
	Leggett & Platt Athletic Center	Joplin	MO	Missouri Southern Lions	MIAA	3,200	1999
	MWSU Fieldhouse at Looney Complex	St. Joseph	MO	Missouri Western Griffons	MIAA	3,000	1981
	Health and Sports Center	Kearney	NE	Nebraska–Kearney Lopers	MIAA	5,100	1990
	Fugate Gymnasium	Wichita	KS	Newman Jets	MIAA	1,242	1999
	NSU Event Center	Tahlequah	OK	Northeastern State RiverHawks	MIAA	3,100	2013
	Bearcat Arena	Maryville	MO	Northwest Missouri State Bearcats	MIAA	2,500	1959
	John Lance Arena	Pittsburg	KS	Pittsburg State Gorillas	MIAA	3,500	1971
	Claremore Expo Center	Claremore	OK	Rogers State Hillcats	MIAA	2,000	2007
	Stubblefield Center	Fort Smith	AR	UAFS Lions and Lady Lions	MIAA		2002
	Lee Arena	Topeka	KS	Washburn Ichabods	MIAA	4,150	1984
	Center for Recreation & Sport	Garden City	NY	Adelphi Panthers	NE-10	2,200	
	Henry A. Butova Gymnasium	Springfield	MA	American International Yellow Jackets	NE-10	2,500	1965
	Andrew Laska Gymnasium	Worcester	MA	Assumption Greyhounds	NE-10	1,200	1962
	Dana Center	Waltham	MA	Bentley Falcons	NE-10	2,600	
	Franklin Pierce Fieldhouse	Rindge	NH	Franklin Pierce Ravens	NE-10	1,200	1967
	Goldstein Recreation Center	New York	NY	Pace Setters	NE-10	2,400	2002
	Stoutenburgh Gymnasium	Goffstown	NH	Saint Anselm Hawks	NE-10	1,200	1960
	Ross Sports Center	Colchester	VT	Saint Michael's Purple Knights	NE-10	2,500	1973
	James Moore Field House	New Haven	CT	Southern Connecticut Owls	NE-10	2,800	
	Stan Spirou Field House	Manchester	NH	Southern New Hampshire Penmen	NE-10	2,000	
	Sanford Pentagon	Sioux Falls	SD	Augustana Vikings	NSIC	3,200	2013
	BSU Gymnasium	Bemidji	MN	Bemidji State Beavers	NSIC	2,500	1960
	Gangelhoff Center	St. Paul	MN	Concordia Golden Bears	NSIC	4,000	1993
	Harold Newman Arena	Jamestown	ND	Jamestown Jimmies	NSIC	2,000	
	McDowell Activity Center	Bismarck	ND	Mary Marauders	NSIC	1,300	
	Lysaker Gymnasium	Crookston	MN	Minnesota Crookston Golden Eagles	NSIC	2,200	1981
	Romano Gymnasium	Duluth	MN	Minnesota Duluth Bulldogs	NSIC	2,759	1953
	Taylor Center	Mankato	MN	Minnesota State Mavericks	NSIC	4,800	2000
	Alex Nemzek Fieldhouse	Moorhead	MN	Minnesota State–Moorhead Dragons	NSIC	2,200	
	MSU Dome	Minot	ND	Minot State Beavers	NSIC	10,000	N/A (early '80s)
	Wachs Arena	Aberdeen	SD	Northern State Wolves	NSIC	8,000	1986
	Halenbeck Hall	St. Cloud	MN	St. Cloud State Huskies	NSIC	6,400	1965
	Stewart Center	Sioux Falls	SD	Sioux Falls Cougars	NSIC	2,000	
	Recreation/Athletic Facility	Marshall	MN	Southwest Minnesota State Mustangs	NSIC	4,000	1996
	Rice Auditorium	Wayne	NE	Wayne State College Wildcats	NSIC	2,500	
	McCown Gymnasium	Winona	MN	Winona State Warriors	NSIC	3,500	
	Chase Gymnasium	La Mirada	CA	Biola Eagles	PacWest	2,400	1962
	McCabe Gymnasium	Honolulu	HI	Chaminade Silverswords	PacWest	2,800	1957
	CU Arena	Irvine	CA	Concordia Irvine Golden Eagles	PacWest	2,400	1989
	Conlan Center	San Rafael	CA	Dominican Penguins	PacWest	1,285	2000
	Shark Tank (St. Francis Gymnasium)	Honolulu	HI	Hawaii Pacific Sharks	PacWest		
	Afook-Chinen Civic Auditorium	Hilo	HI	Hawaii–Hilo Vulcans	PacWest	2,868	1957
	Warrior Arena	Rocklin	CA	Jessup Warriors	PacWest	1,140	
	Golden Gymnasium	San Diego	CA	Point Loma Nazarene Sea Lions	PacWest	1,750	1962
	Freed Center	Costa Mesa	CA	Vanguard Lions	PacWest	1,910	2024
	Murchison Gymnasium	Santa Barbara	CA	Westmont Warriors	PacWest	1,179	1969
	Christenberry Fieldhouse	Augusta	GA	Augusta Jaguars	PBC	3,026	1991
	The Loch and Mason Barfield Court	Morrow	GA	Clayton State Lakers	PBC	1,700	
	Frank G. Lumpkin Jr. Center	Columbus	GA	Columbus State Cougars	PBC	4,500	
	Flagler Gymnasium	St. Augustine	FL	Flagler Saints	PBC	1,750	1976
	Centennial Center	Milledgeville	GA	Georgia College Bobcats	PBC	4,078	1989
	Storm Dome	Americus	GA	Georgia Southwestern State Hurricanes	PBC	2,500	2004
	Finis Horne Arena	Greenwood	SC	Lander Bearcats	PBC	2,276	1993
	Morris Gymnasium	Cochran	GA	Middle Georgia State Knights	PBC	N/A	
	UNG Convocation Center	Dahlonega	GA	North Georgia Nighthawks	PBC	3,600	2018
	Convocation Center	Aiken	SC	USC Aiken Pacers	PBC	3,600	2007
	USCB Recreation Center	Bluffton	SC	USC Beaufort Sand Sharks	PBC	1,200	2015
	Nelson Field House	Bloomsburg	PA	Bloomsburg Huskies	PSAC	1,745	1972
	California University of Pennsylvania Convocation Center	California	PA	California Vulcans	PSAC	4,000	2011
	Waldo S. Tippin Gymnasium	Clarion	PA	Clarion Golden Eagles	PSAC	2,500	1968
	Koehler Fieldhouse	East Stroudsburg	PA	East Stroudsburg Warriors	PSAC	1,500	1967
	McComb Fieldhouse	Edinboro	PA	Edinboro Fighting Scots	PSAC	3,500	1971
	Highmark Events Center	Erie	PA	Gannon Golden Knights	PSAC	2,800	1949
	Kovalchick Convention and Athletic Complex	Indiana	PA	Indiana Crimson Hawks	PSAC	5,000	2011
	Keystone Hall	Kutztown	PA	Kutztown Golden Bears	PSAC	3,400	1971
	Thomas Fieldhouse	Lock Haven	PA	Lock Haven Bald Eagles	PSAC	2,500	1935
	Marion Decker Gymnasium	Mansfield	PA	Mansfield Mountaineers	PSAC	1,600	1970
	Pucillo Gymnasium	Millersville	PA	Millersville Marauders	PSAC	3,000	1970
	Sports Center	Johnstown	PA	Pittsburgh-Johnstown Mountain Cats	PSAC	2,400	
	Katherine Mabis McKenna Center	Greensburg	PA	Seton Hill Griffins	PSAC	1,200	
	Butcher Athletic Center	Shepherdstown	WV	Shepherd Rams	PSAC	3,600	1989
	Heiges Field House	Shippensburg	PA	Shippensburg Raiders	PSAC	2,768	1971
	Morrow Field House	Slippery Rock	PA	Slippery Rock (The Rock)	PSAC	3,000	1959
	Hollinger Field House	West Chester	PA	West Chester Golden Rams	PSAC	2,500	1949
	Plachy Main Gym	Alamosa	CO	Adams State Grizzlies	RMAC	1,563	
	Donald E. Young Center	Spearfish	SD	Black Hills State Yellow Jackets	RMAC	3,500	1990
	Chicoine Center	Chadron	NE	Chadron State Eagles	RMAC	1,750	2014
	CCU Event Center	Lakewood	CO	Colorado Christian Cougars	RMAC	1,500	
	Brownson Arena	Grand Junction	CO	Colorado Mesa Mavericks	RMAC	1,800	1968
	Lockridge Arena	Golden	CO	Colorado Mines Orediggers	RMAC	3,000	
	Gallogly Events Center	Colorado Springs	CO	Colorado Springs Mountain Lions	RMAC	1,250	2010
	Massari Arena	Pueblo	CO	Colorado State-Pueblo ThunderWolves	RMAC	3,900	1971
	Whalen Gymnasium	Durango	CO	Fort Lewis Skyhawks	RMAC	2,750	
	Auraria Event Center	Denver	CO	Metropolitan State Roadrunners	RMAC	2,200	1976
	Wilson Complex	Las Vegas	NM	New Mexico Highlands Cowboys and Cowgirls	RMAC	4,250	1986
	Regis Field House	Denver	CO	Regis Rangers	RMAC	1,800	1960
	King Center	Rapid City	SD	South Dakota Mines Hardrockers	RMAC	3,000	
	Paul Wright Gym	Gunnison	CO	Western Colorado Mountaineers	RMAC	1,800	1951
	Behnken Field House	Salt Lake City	UT	Westminster Griffins	RMAC	1,200	2006
	Abney Athletic Center	Anderson	SC	Anderson Trojans	SAC	1,259	1979
	Holt Fieldhouse	Jefferson City	TN	Carson-Newman Eagles	SAC	2,000	1959
	DeLoach Center	Hartsville	SC	Coker Cobras	SAC	1,908	2014
	Goodman Gymnasium	Salisbury	NC	Catawba Indians	SAC	3,500	1970
	John Rutledge King Center	Emory	VA	Emory and Henry Wasps	SAC	1,240	1970
	Shuford Memorial Gymnasium	Hickory	NC	Lenoir–Rhyne Bears	SAC	3,200	1956
	Tex Turner Arena	Harrogate	TN	Lincoln Memorial Railsplitters	SAC	5,009	1991
	Stanford Arena	Mars Hill	NC	Mars Hill Lions	SAC	2,300	
	Eleazer Arena	Newberry	SC	Newberry Wolves	SAC	1,385	1981
	Pioneer Arena	Tusculum	TN	Tusculum Pioneers	SAC	2,000	1998
	David J. Prior Convocation Center	Wise	VA	UVA Wise Cavaliers	SAC	3,000	2011
	Cuddy Arena	Wingate	NC	Wingate Bulldogs	SAC	2,300	1986
	HPER Complex	Albany	GA	Albany State Golden Rams	SIAC	5,000	1997
	John Hurst Adams Gymnasium	Columbia	SC	Allen Yellow Jackets	SIAC		
	HRC Arena	Columbia	SC	Benedict Tigers	SIAC	3,500	
	Beacom/Lewis Gym	Wilberforce	OH	Central State Marauders and Lady Marauders	SIAC	2,075	
	L. S. Epps Gymnasium	Atlanta	GA	Clark Atlanta Panthers	SIAC	1,800	
	Adams-Jenkins Community Sports & Music Complex	Jacksonville	FL	Edward Waters Tigers	SIAC	1,800	2006
	HPE Basketball Arena/Wildcat Arena	Fort Valley	GA	Fort Valley State Wildcats	SIAC	5,000	
	William Exum Center	Frankfort	KY	Kentucky State Thorobreds and Thorobrettes	SIAC	2,750	1994
	J. F. Lane Gymnasium	Jackson	TN	Lane Dragons	SIAC	2,500	
	Bruce-Johnson Hall	Memphis	TN	LeMoyne-Owen Magicians	SIAC	1,000	
	Knox-Windham Gymnasium	Fairfield	AL	Miles Golden Bears	SIAC	2,000	
	Forbes Arena	Atlanta	GA	Morehouse Maroon Tigers	SIAC	6,000	1996
	Tiger Arena	Savannah	GA	Savannah State Tigers and Lady Tigers	SIAC	5,000	2000
	Arthur R. Outlaw Recreation Center	Mobile	AL	Spring Hill Badgers	SIAC	2,000	
	Daniel "Chappie" James Center	Tuskegee	AL	Tuskegee Golden Tigers	SIAC	5,000	1987
	Health and Sports Center	Miami Shores	FL	Barry Buccaneers	SSC	1,500	
	McArthur Center	St. Petersburg	FL	Eckerd Tritons	SSC	2,535	
	ICI Center	Daytona Beach	FL	Embry–Riddle Eagles	SSC	1,968	1995
	Jenkins Field House	Lakeland	FL	Florida Southern Moccasins	SSC	1,800	1965
	Clemente Center	Melbourne	FL	Florida Tech Panthers	SSC	3,500	2001
	de Hoernle Sports and Cultural Center	Boca Raton	FL	Lynn Fighting Knights	SSC	1,000	1993
	Rick Case Arena	Davie	FL	Nova Southeastern Sharks	SSC	4,500	2006
	Rubin Arena	West Palm Beach	FL	Palm Beach Atlantic Sailfish	SSC	2,000	
	Alfond Sports Center	Winter Park	FL	Rollins Tars	SSC	2,500	2000
	Bowman Center	St. Leo	FL	Saint Leo Lions	SSC	1,500	
	Bob Martinez Sports Center	Tampa	FL	Tampa Spartans	SSC	3,432	1984

== Additional arenas ==
Image	Arena	City	State/Province	Team	Conference	Capacity	Opened
	H. D. Kesling Gymnasium	Westville	IN	Purdue Northwest Pride	GLIAC	1,500	2016
	Elmen Center	Sioux Falls	SD	Augustana Vikings	NSIC	4,000	1989
	Oman Arena	Jackson	TN	Lane Dragons	SIAC	5,600	1967

== Future arenas ==
This list includes facilities that are currently under construction, as well as existing facilities of schools that have announced future moves to NCAA Division II. Conference affiliations reflect those known to be in place as of the team's entry into Division II or the venue's opening, as applicable.

Image	Arena	City	State/Province	Team	Conference	Capacity	Opened/opening
	Student Union Gymnasium	Scranton	PA	Lackawanna Falcons	PSAC (2027)		
	University Sports Complex	New Orleans	LA	Loyola Wolf Pack	GSC (2027)	500	1987
	Monroe Athletic Complex	New Rochelle	NY	Monroe Mustangs	CACC (2027)		2011
	Patterson Student Center	Texarkana	TX	Texas A&M–Texarkana Eagles	Lone Star (2027)		2018
	Sid Richardson Center	Fort Worth	TX	Texas Wesleyan Rams	Lone Star (2028)		1970

== See also ==
- List of NCAA Division I basketball arenas
