= SIAC women's basketball tournament =

Southern Intercollegiate Athletic Conference women's basketball tournament
- Conference basketball championship
- Sport: Basketball
- Conference: Southern Intercollegiate Athletic Conference
- Format: Single-elimination tournament
- Played: 1979–present
- Current champion: Miles (3rd)
- Most championships: Fort Valley State (11)
- Official website: SIAC women's basketball

The Southern Intercollegiate Athletic Conference women's basketball tournament is the annual conference women's basketball championship tournament for the Southern Intercollegiate Athletic Conference. The tournament has been held annually since 1978. It is a single-elimination tournament and seeding is based on regular season records.

The winner receives the SIAC's automatic bid to the NCAA Division II women's basketball tournament.

Fort Valley State have been the most successful team at the CIAA tournament, with eleven championships.

== History ==
SIAC women's basketball tournament
| Year | Champions | Runner-up |
|---|---|---|
| 1979 | Tuskegee (1) | Fort Valley State |
| 1980 | Albany State (1) | Fort Valley State |
| 1981 | Albany State (2) | Fort Valley State |
| 1982 | Clark (1) | Fort Valley State |
| 1983 | Tuskegee (2) | Albany State |
| 1984 | Alabama A&M (1) | Fort Valley State |
| 1985 | Clark (2) | Albany State |
| 1986 | Clark (3) | Alabama A&M |
| 1987 | Albany State (3) | Alabama A&M |
| 1988 | Fort Valley State (1) | Alabama A&M |
| 1989 | Albany State (4) | Fort Valley State |
| 1990 | Albany State (5) | Tuskegee |
| 1991 | Alabama A&M (2) | Paine |
| 1992 | Fort Valley State (2) | Alabama A&M |
| 1993 | Fort Valley State (3) | Savannah State |
| 1994 | LeMoyne–Owen (1) | Alabama A&M |
| 1995 | Fort Valley State (4) | Albany State |
| 1996 | Albany State (6) | Clark Atlanta |
| 1997 | Kentucky State (1) | Alabama A&M |
| 1998 | Albany State (7) | Clark Atlanta |
| 1999 | Clark Atlanta (4) | Fort Valley State |
| 2000 | Fort Valley State (5) | Kentucky State |
| 2001 | Fort Valley State (6) | Clark Atlanta |
| 2002 | Fort Valley State (7) | Tuskegee |
| 2003 | Fort Valley State (8) | Tuskegee |
| 2004 | Benedict (1) | Tuskegee |
| 2005 | Paine (1) | Fort Valley State |
| 2006 | Paine (2) | Fort Valley State |
| 2007 | Benedict (2) | Fort Valley State |
| 2008 | Tuskegee (3) | Kentucky State |
| 2009 | Fort Valley State (9) | Clark Atlanta |
| 2010 | Benedict (3) | Stillman |
| 2011 | Fort Valley State (10) | Miles |
| 2012 | Fort Valley State (11) | Tuskegee |
| 2013 | Clark Atlanta (5) | Benedict |
| 2014 | Benedict (4) | Albany State |
| 2015 | Albany State (8) | Benedict |
| 2016 | Benedict (5) | Kentucky State |
| 2017 | Benedict (6) | Central State |
| 2018 | Clark Atlanta (6) | Central State |
| 2019 | Lane (1) | Kentucky State |
| 2020 | Benedict (7) | Tuskegee |
| 2021 | Cancelled due to COVID-19 pandemic | |
| 2022 | Benedict (8) | Savannah State |

SIAC women's basketball tournament
| Year | Champions | Score | Runner-up | Venue |
|---|---|---|---|---|
| 2023 | Tuskegee (4) | 72–65 | Miles | Tiger Arena (Savannah, GA) |
| 2024 | Miles | 75–72 | Kentucky State | Tiger Arena (Savannah, GA) |
| 2025 | Miles | 68–54 | Tuskegee | Forbes Arena (Atlanta, GA) |
| 2026 | Miles | 59–52 | Lane | Clayton County Convocation Center (Clayton, GA) |

== Championship records ==
| School | Titles | Years |
|---|---|---|
| Fort Valley State | 11 | 1988, 1992, 1993, 1995, 2000, 2001, 2002, 2003, 2009, 2011, 2012 |
| Benedict | 8 | 2004, 2007, 2010, 2014, 2016, 2017, 2020, 2022 |
| Albany State | 8 | 1980, 1981, 1987, 1989, 1990, 1996, 1998, 2015 |
| Clark | 6 | 1982, 1985, 1986, 1999, 2013, 2018 |
| Tuskegee | 4 | 1979, 1983, 2008, 2023 |
| Miles | 3 | 2024, 2025, 2026 |
| Paine | 2 | 2005, 2006 |
| Alabama A&M | 2 | 1984, 1991 |
| Lane | 1 | 2019 |
| Kentucky State | 1 | 1997 |
| LeMoyne–Owen | 1 | 1994 |

- Allen, Central State (OH), Edward Waters, Savannah State, and Spring Hill have not yet won the SIAC tournament
- Claflin, Fisk, Knoxville, Morris Brown, Paine, Rust, and Stillman never won the tournament as SIAC members
- Schools highlighted in pink are former members of the SIAC

== See also ==
- SIAC men's basketball tournament
