= SIAC men's basketball tournament =

Southern Intercollegiate Athletic Conference men's basketball tournament
- Conference basketball championship
- Sport: Basketball
- Conference: Southern Intercollegiate Athletic Conference
- Format: Single-elimination tournament
- Played: 1934–present
- Current champion: Morehouse (7th)
- Most championships: Florida A&M (12)
- Official website: SIAC men's basketball

The Southern Intercollegiate Athletic Conference men's basketball tournament is the annual conference men's basketball championship tournament for the Southern Intercollegiate Athletic Conference. The tournament has been held annually since 1934. It is a single-elimination tournament and seeding is based on regular season records.

The winner receives the SIAC's automatic bid to the NCAA Division II men's basketball tournament.

Florida A&M have been the most successful team at the SIAC tournament, with twelve championships.

== History ==
SIAC men's basketball tournament
Year	Champions	Runner-up
1934	Tuskegee (1)	Clark
1935	Alabama State (1)	LeMoyne–Owen
1936	Alabama State (2)	Morehouse
1937	Morehouse (1)	Clark
1938	Xavier Louisiana (1)	Clark
1939	Xavier Louisiana (2)	Morehouse
1940	Clark (1)	Florida A&M
1941	Xavier Louisiana (3)	Tuskegee
1942	Florida A&M (1)	Tuskegee
1943	South Carolina State (1)	Xavier Louisiana
1944	Tuskegee (2)	Clark
1945	Florida A&M (2)	Alabama State
1946	Morehouse (2)	Tuskegee
1947	Florida A&M (3)	Alabama State
1948	Tuskegee (3)	South Carolina State
1949	Morris Brown (1)	Florida A&M
1950	Morris Brown (2)	Florida A&M
1951	Morris Brown (3)	Florida A&M
1952	Florida A&M (4)	Alabama State
1953	Bethune–Cookman (1)	Xavier Louisiana
1954	Clark (2)	Florida A&M
1955	Florida A&M (5)	
1956	Knoxville (1)	Morehouse
1957	Florida A&M (6)	Tuskegee
1958	Florida A&M (7)	Benedict
1959	Morris Brown (4)	Morehouse
1960	Florida A&M (8)	South Carolina State
1961	Benedict (1)	South Carolina State
1962	Florida A&M (9)	South Carolina State
1963	Fisk (1)	Clark
1964	South Carolina State (2)	Florida A&M
1965	Clark (3)	Bethune–Cookman
1966	South Carolina State (3)	Clark
1967	Florida A&M (10)	South Carolina State
1968	Bethune–Cookman (2)	Florida A&M
1969	Fort Valley State (1)	Tuskgee
1970	Savannah State (1)	Alabama State
1971	Alabama State (3)	Albany State
1972	Alabama State (4)	Bethune–Cookman
1973	Albany State (1)	Alabama State
1974	Fisk (2)	Florida A&M
1975	Alabama A&M (1)	Miles
1976	Alabama A&M (2)	Fisk
1977	Florida A&M (11)	Bethune–Cookman
1978	Florida A&M (12)	Bethune–Cookman
1979	Tuskegee (4)	Florida A&M
1980	Bethune–Cookman (3)	Benedict
1981	Morehouse (3)	Clark
1982	Morris Brown (5)	Albany State
1983	Albany State (2)	Fort Valley State
1984	Albany State (3)	Tuskegee
1985	Albany State (4)	Savannah State
1986	Alabama A&M (3)	Morris Brown
1987	Alabama A&M (4)	Clark
1988	Alabama A&M (5)	Albany State
1989	Alabama A&M (6)	Paine
1990	Morehouse (4)	Albany State
1991	Morehouse (5)	Miles
1992	Albany State (5)	Alabama A&M
1993	Alabama A&M (7)	LeMoyne–Owen
1994	Paine (1)	Alabama A&M
1995	Alabama A&M (8)	Morehouse
1996	Alabama A&M (9)	Morehouse
1997	Albany State (6)	Clark Atlanta
1998	Fort Valley State (2)	Morehouse
1999	Paine (2)	Clark Atlanta
2000	LeMoyne–Owen (1)	Fort Valley State
2001	Kentucky State (1)	Fort Valley State
2002	Paine (3)	Morehouse
2003	Morehouse (6)	Miles
2004	Benedict (2)	Morehouse
2005	Lane (1)	Albany State
2006	Stillman (1)	Miles
2007	Albany State (7)	Fort Valley State
2008	Benedict (3)	Tuskegee
2009	LeMoyne–Owen (2)	Clark Atlanta
2010	Tuskegee (5)	Clark Atlanta
2011	Clark Atlanta (4)	Stillman
2012	Benedict (4)	LeMoyne–Owen
2013	Benedict (5)	Morehouse
2014	Tuskegee (6)	Fort Valley State
2015	Benedict (6)	Lane
2016	Stillman (2)	LeMoyne–Owen
2017	Clark Atlanta (5)	Fort Valley State
2018	Claflin (1)	Clark Atlanta
2019	Miles (1)	LeMoyne–Owen
2020	Miles (2)	Albany State
2021	Not held due to COVID-19 pandemic	
2022	Savannah State (2)	Benedict
2023	Miles (3)	Benedict
2024	Clark Atlanta (6)	Miles
2025	Savannah State (3)	Tuskegee
2026	Morehouse (7)	Tuskegee

== Championship records ==
School	Titles	Years
Florida A&M	12	1942, 1945, 1947, 1952, 1955, 1957, 1958, 1960, 1962, 1967, 1977, 1978
Alabama A&M	9	1975, 1976, 1986, 1987, 1988, 1989, 1993, 1995, 1996
Morehouse	7	1937, 1946, 1981, 1990, 1991, 2003, 2026
Albany State	7	1973, 1983, 1984, 1985, 1992, 1997, 2007
Clark Atlanta (Clark)	6	1940, 1954, 1965, 2011, 2017, 2024
Benedict	6	1961, 2004, 2008, 2012, 2013, 2015
Tuskegee	6	1934, 1944, 1948, 1979, 2010, 2014
Morris Brown	5	1949, 1950, 1951, 1959, 1982
Alabama State	4	1935, 1936, 1971, 1972
Savannah State	3	1970, 2022, 2025
Miles	3	2019, 2020, 2023
Paine	3	1994, 1999, 2002
Bethune–Cookman	3	1953, 1968, 1980
South Carolina State	3	1943, 1964, 1966
Xavier Louisiana	3	1938, 1939, 1941
Stillman	2	2006, 2016
LeMoyne–Owen	2	2000, 2009
Fort Valley State	2	1969, 1998
Fisk	2	1963, 1974
Claflin	1	2018
Lane	1	2005
Kentucky State	1	2001
Knoxville	1	1956

- Allen, Central State (OH), Edward Waters, and Spring Hill have not yet won the SIAC tournament
- Rust and Talladega never won the tournament as SIAC members
- Schools highlighted in pink are former members of the SIAC

== See also ==
- SIAC women's basketball tournament
