= Rocky Mountain Athletic Conference =

Collegiate athletic conference in the western United States

- Formerly: Colorado Faculty Athletic Conference (1909–1910); Rocky Mountain Faculty Athletic Conference (1910–1967)
- Association: NCAA
- Founded: 1909
- Commissioner: Lexie Vernon (Interim) (since 2025)
- Sports fielded: 22; men's: 11; women's: 11
- Division: Division II
- No. of teams: 15
- Headquarters: Colorado Springs, Colorado
- Region: Mountain States and Great Plains
- Website: rmacsports.org

Locations

The Rocky Mountain Athletic Conference (RMAC), commonly known as the Rocky Mountain Conference (RMC) from approximately 1910 through the late 1960s, is a college athletic conference affiliated with the National Collegiate Athletic Association (NCAA) at the Division II level, which operates in the western United States. Most member schools are in Colorado, with additional members in Nebraska, New Mexico, South Dakota, and Utah.

== History ==
Founded in 1909, the Rocky Mountain Athletic Conference is the fifth oldest active college athletic conference in the United States, the oldest in NCAA Division II, and the sixth to be founded after the Michigan Intercollegiate Athletic Association, the Big Ten Conference, the Southern Intercollegiate Athletic Association, the Ohio Athletic Conference, and the Missouri Valley Conference. For its first 30 years, the RMAC was considered a major conference, equivalent to today's NCAA Division I, before seven of its larger members left in 1938 to form the Mountain States Conference, also called the Skyline Conference.

The original name of Colorado Faculty Athletic Conference was changed to Rocky Mountain Faculty Athletic Conference (RMFAC) on May 7, 1910. The presidents assumed control of the league from the faculty in 1967 and changed the name to Rocky Mountain Athletic Conference. The Colorado Athletic Conference dissolved in 1996, with the RMAC absorbing the remaining CAC teams. The RMAC became an NCAA member in 1992 after competing in the NAIA through 1991.

=== Chronological timeline ===
Rocky Mountain Athletic Conference Member Locations
Location of RMAC members:
full member
- 1909: On 6 March 1909, the Rocky Mountain Athletic Conference (RMFC) was founded as the Colorado Faculty Athletic Conference (CFAC). Charter members included the University of Colorado, Colorado Agricultural College (now Colorado State University), Colorado College and the Colorado School of Mines, beginning the
- 1910:
  - The CFAC was rebranded as the Rocky Mountain Faculty Athletic Conference (RMFAC).
  - Colorado College dropped out after a falling out with Colorado Mines.
  - The University of Denver and the University of Utah joined the RMFAC. Membership was at five schools.
- 1914: The Agricultural College of Utah (now Utah State University) joined the RMFAC, with Colorado College rejoining. Membership was brought up to seven schools.
- 1917: The Montana College of Agriculture and Mechanic Arts (now Montana State University) joined the RMFAC as the eighth member.
- 1918: Brigham Young University (BYU) joined the RMFAC as the ninth member.
- 1921: The University of Wyoming joined the RMFAC. Membership was brought up to ten schools.
- 1924: Western State College of Colorado (now Western Colorado University) and the State Normal School of Colorado (now the University of Northern Colorado) joined the RMFAC. Membership was brought up to 12 schools.
- 1937: Colorado, Colorado State, Brigham Young, Utah, Utah State, Wyoming and Denver left the RMFAC to form the Skyline Conference (also known as the Mountain States Conference). The five remaining members of the RMFAC were Colorado College, Colorado Mines, Montana State, Northern Colorado and Western State.
- 1948: Idaho State College (now Idaho State University) joined the RMFAC as the sixth member.
- 1956: Adams State College (now Adams State University) joined the RMFAC as the seventh member.
- 1958: Idaho State left the RMFAC. Membership was brought back down to six.
- 1959: Montana State left the RMFAC. Membership was brought back down to five.
- 1967:
  - The RMFAC was rebranded as the Rocky Mountain Athletic Conference (RMAC).
  - Colorado College left the RMAC. Membership was brought back down to five.
  - Kansas State Teachers College at Emporia (now Emporia State University, Fort Hays State College (now Fort Hays State University), Fort Lewis College, the University of Omaha (now the University of Nebraska at Omaha, but athletically branded as "Omaha"), Kansas State College at Pittsburg (now Pittsburg State University), Southern Colorado State College (now Colorado State University Pueblo), the College of Southern Utah (now Southern Utah University), Regis College (now Regis University), Washburn University, Western New Mexico University and Westminster College of Utah (now Westminster University) joined the RMFAC. Membership was brought up to fifteen schools.
  - The new league was divided into two divisions: Mountains (consisting of Adams State, Colorado Mines, Fort Lewis, Regis, Southern Utah State, Western New Mexico, Western State and Westminster) and Plains (consisting of Fort Hays State, Emporia State, Pittsburg State, Nebraska-Omaha, Northern Colorado, Southern Colorado and Washburn).
- 1968: New Mexico Highlands University joined the RMAC as its 16th member.
- 1969: New Mexico Highlands left the RMAC due to financial aid restrictions. Membership was brought back down to 15.
- 1972: For economic reasons, the two divisions were split into two separate conferences. The Mountain Division kept the RMAC name while the Plains Division became known as the Great Plains Athletic Conference. The two allied conferences worked under the name of the Mountain and Plains Intercollegiate Athletic Association (MPIAA). RMAC membership stood at eight with Adams State, Colorado Mines, Fort Lewis, Regis, Southern Utah State, Western New Mexico, Western State and Westminster (Utah). Northern Colorado ended up leaving the association to become independent (who would later join the GPAC back).
- 1974: New Mexico Highlands rejoined the RMAC as the ninth member.
- 1975: Mesa College (now Colorado Mesa University) joined the RMAC as its tenth member.
- 1976:
  - The MPIAA was dissolved for economic reasons, and the two conferences went their separate ways.
  - Colorado State–Pueblo (CSU Pueblo) joined the RMAC as its 11th member, coming from the GPAC.
- 1978: The RMAC began sponsoring women's championships.
- 1979: Westminster left the RMAC when the school dropped its athletics program as a result. Membership was brought back down to ten members.
- 1983: Regis left the RMAC to become an Independent. Membership was brought back down to nine members.
- 1986: Southern Utah left the RMAC. Membership was brought back down to eight members.
- 1988: New Mexico Highlands left the RMAC. Membership was brought back down to seven members.
- 1989: Chadron State College, Kearney State College (now the University of Nebraska at Kearney), and Wayne State College joined the RMAC (with Fort Hays State rejoining). Membership was brought up to 11 members. All of them were with provisional member status.
- 1990:
  - Colorado State–Pueblo, Fort Lewis, Nebraska–Kearney, Wayne State and Western New Mexico left the RMAC. Membership was brought back down to six members. Reasons: Wayne State and Nebraska–Kearney did it after staying for one season; Western New Mexico and Colorado State–Pueblo would later decide to follow suit; and Fort Lewis did the same, while it stayed on as an associate member of the conference for football, softball and wrestling.
  - New Mexico Highlands rejoined the RMAC again. Membership was brought back down to seven members.
- 1992: The RMAC became affiliated with the National Collegiate Athletic Association (NCAA) at the Division II ranks, after spending years in the National Association of Intercollegiate Athletics (NAIA).
- 1994: Fort Lewis and Nebraska–Kearney both rejoined the RMAC as full members. Membership was brought back down to nine members.
- 1996:
  - Colorado Christian University and Metropolitan State College of Denver (now athletically branded as MSU Denver) joined the RMAC for the first time, and Colorado State–Pueblo and Regis rejoined the conference.
  - Also, the University of Colorado at Colorado Springs (now athletically branded as UCCS) and the University of Denver joined the RMAC as an affiliate and associate members, respectively. The RMAC, at that time comprising 13 member schools.
- 1997:
  - Denver left to move up to the Division I ranks.
  - Colorado–Colorado Springs (UCCS) upgraded for all sports. Membership was brought up to 14 members, thus it was split into two seven-team divisions.
  - San Francisco State University joined the RMAC as an associate member for wrestling only.
- 2006:
  - Fort Hays State left the RMAC to join the MIAA; although it did remain in the RMAC as an associate member for wrestling.
  - Western New Mexico rejoined the RMAC. Membership was kept at 14 members.
- 2007:
  - Grand Canyon University joined the RMAC as an associate member only for wrestling.
  - Montana State University Billings joined the RMAC as an associate member for women's golf and men's and women's tennis.
- 2008:
  - The University of Texas–Permian Basin (UTPB) and the University of the Incarnate Word (UIW) joined the RMAC as associate members for swimming only.
  - Grand Canyon added men's and women's swimming to its RMAC associate membership.
- 2009: Northern State University and Minnesota State University Moorhead joined the RMAC as associate members for swimming.
- 2012:
  - Nebraska–Kearney left the RMAC to join the MIAA.
  - Black Hills State University joined the RMAC. Membership was kept at 14 members.
  - Fort Hays State left the RMAC as an associate member for wrestling; once its primary home conference (the MIAA) began sponsoring that sport.
  - Minnesota State–Moorhead and Northern State left the RMAC as associate members for women's swimming; once their primary home conference (the Northern Sun Intercollegiate Conference, a.k.a. the NSIC) began sponsoring the sport.
- 2013:
  - California Baptist University joined the RMAC as an associate member for three sports: men's and women's swimming, plus wrestling.
  - Two schools joined for women's lacrosse only: Lindenwood University and Rockhurst University.
  - Grand Canyon and Incarnate Word ended their RMAC associate memberships and started transitions to NCAA Division I and the Western Athletic Conference (WAC) & the Southland Conference (SLC), respectively.
  - UT Permian Basin moved its swimming teams to the single-sport New South Intercollegiate Swim Conference (NSISC).
- 2014: South Dakota School of Mines and Technology (SDSM&T or South Dakota Mines) joined the RMAC. Membership was brought up to 15 members.
- 2015:
  - Westminster (Utah) rejoined the RMAC. Membership was brought up to 16 members.
  - Rockhurst added men's lacrosse to its RMAC associate membership.
  - Oklahoma Baptist University joined the RMAC as an associate member for women's lacrosse, plus men's and women's swimming.
  - Montana State Billings dropped men's and women's tennis, which ended their affiliate membership.
- 2016:
  - Western New Mexico left the RMAC to join the Lone Star Conference (LSC). Membership was brought back down to 15 members.
  - Two schools joined the RMAC as associate members:
    - Dixie State University (now Utah Tech University) in football
    - and Maryville University in men's lacrosse.
- 2017:
  - Maryville left the RMAC as an associate member for men's lacrosse; once its primary home conference (the Great Lakes Valley Conference, a.k.a. the GLVC) began sponsoring the sport.
  - Oklahoma Christian University joined the RMAC as an associate member for men's and women's swimming.
- 2018:
  - Dixie State upgraded for all sports. Membership was brought up to 16 members.
  - California Baptist ended its RMAC associate memberships to move to Division I; both swimming teams joined Cal Baptist's new primary home conference in the WAC, while wrestling became an independent (that sport would later be accepted by the Big 12 Conference effective in 2022).
  - Rockhurst left the RMAC as an associate member for men's lacrosse to join the school's other sports in its primary home conference (the GLVC).
  - The RMAC dropped men's tennis as a conference sport.
- 2019:
  - Lindenwood and Rockhurst left the RMAC as associate members for women's lacrosse left the RMAC to join the school's other sports in its primary home conference (the GLVC).
  - The RMAC dropped women's tennis as a conference sport.
- 2020:
  - Dixie State (Utah Tech) left the RMAC to join the NCAA Division I ranks and the WAC.
- 2022: UT Permian Basin rejoined the RMAC as an associate member for men's and women's swimming and diving.
- 2023:
  - The RMAC added women's wrestling as a conference sport, and added Simon Fraser University and Texas Woman's University as inaugural associate members for the sport. Simon Fraser also joined as an associate member for men's wrestling, as well as swimming & diving for both sexes.
  - Concordia University Irvine joined as an associate member for men's lacrosse.
- 2024:
  - Dominican University of California joined as an associate member for men's lacrosse.
  - San Francisco State left the RMAC as an associate member for men's wrestling to join the Mountain Pacific Sports Federation (MPSF).
- 2025:
  - Northwest Nazarene University joined as an associate member for men's lacrosse.

== Member schools ==
=== Current members ===
The RMAC currently has 15 full members, all but three are public schools:

Institution	Location	Founded	Affiliation	Enrollment	Nickname	Joined (Note: Represents the calendar year when fall sports competition begins.)	Colors
Adams State University	Alamosa, Colorado	1921	Public	2,901	Grizzlies	1956 (Note: The Adams State men's basketball and football teams joined the RMAC a year after becoming a full member for other sports (1957–58).)	
Black Hills State University	Spearfish, South Dakota	1883	Public	3,346	Yellow Jackets	2012	
Chadron State College	Chadron, Nebraska	1911	Public	2,098	Eagles	1989	
Colorado Christian University	Lakewood, Colorado	1914	Christian (Evangelical)	9,951	Cougars	1996	
University of Colorado–Colorado Springs (UCCS)	Colorado Springs, Colorado	1965	Public	11,354	Mountain Lions	1997 (Note: Colorado–Colorado Springs (UCCS) was an associate member of the RMAC only during the 1996–97 school year for some sports before accepting full membership, effective in the 1997–98 school year.)	
Colorado Mesa University	Grand Junction, Colorado	1925	Public	9,785	Mavericks	1975	
Colorado School of Mines	Golden, Colorado	1873	Public	8,044	Orediggers	1909	
Colorado State University Pueblo (CSU Pueblo)	Pueblo, Colorado	1933	Public	6,851	ThunderWolves	1967; 1976; 1996 (Note: CSU Pueblo left the RMAC after the 1971–72 school year then rejoined from 1976–77 to 1989–90 before rejoining in the 1996–97 school year.)	
Fort Lewis College	Durango, Colorado	1911	Public	3,544	Skyhawks	1967; 1994 (Note: Fort Lewis was an affiliate member of the RMAC from 1990–91 to 1993–94 before rejoining as a full member in the 1994–95 school year.)	
Metropolitan State University of Denver (MSU Denver)	Denver, Colorado	1965	Public	18,453	Roadrunners	1996	
New Mexico Highlands University	Las Vegas, New Mexico	1893	Public	2,704	Cowboys & Cowgirls	1968; 1974; 1990 (Note: New Mexico Highlands left the RMAC after the 1968–69 school year then rejoined from 1974–75 to 1987–88 before rejoining in the 1990–91 school year.)	
Regis University	Denver, Colorado	1877	Catholic (Jesuit)	4,605	Rangers	1967; 1996 (Note: Regis left the RMAC after the 1982–83 school year before rejoining in the 1996–97 school year.)	
South Dakota School of Mines and Technology (South Dakota Mines)	Rapid City, South Dakota	1885	Public	2,576	Hardrockers	2014 (Note: The South Dakota Mines men's and women's basketball and men's soccer teams joined the RMAC a year after becoming a full member for other sports (2015–16); while its football team joined the RMAC two years after (2016–17).)	
Western Colorado University	Gunnison, Colorado	1901	Public	3,568	Mountaineers	1924	
Westminster University	Salt Lake City, Utah	1875	Nonsectarian	1,155	Griffins	1967; 2015 (Note: Westminster left the RMAC after the 1978–79 school year before rejoining in the 2015–16 school year.)	

=== Affiliate members ===
The RMAC currently has eight affiliate members; half are private schools, while the other half are public schools:

Institution	Location	Founded	Affiliation	Enrollment	Nickname	Joined (Note: Represents the calendar year when fall sports competition begins.)	Colors	RMAC sport(s)	Primary conference
Concordia University Irvine	Irvine, California	1976	Lutheran LCMS	3,522	Golden Eagles	2023		men's lacrosse	Pacific West (PacWest)
Dominican University of California	San Rafael, California	1890	Catholic	1,818	Penguins	2024		men's lacrosse	Pacific West (PacWest)
University of Nebraska at Kearney (Note: Nebraska–Kearney was a full member during the 1989–90 school year; and from 1994–95 to 2011–12.)	Kearney, Nebraska	1905	Public	5,881	Lopers	2014		women's swimming & diving	Mid-America (MIAA)
Northwest Nazarene University	Nampa, Idaho	1913	Nazarene	1,646	Nighthawks	2025		men's lacrosse	Great Northwest (GNAC)
Oklahoma Christian University	Edmond, Oklahoma	1950	Churches of Christ	2,153	Eagles & Lady Eagles	2017		men's swimming & diving	Lone Star (LSC)
Oklahoma Christian University	Edmond, Oklahoma	1950	Churches of Christ	2,153	Eagles & Lady Eagles	2017		women's swimming & diving	Lone Star (LSC)
Simon Fraser University (Note: Simon Fraser has announced plans to leave the NCAA and rejoin Canada's governing body of U Sports in 2027.)	Burnaby, British Columbia	1965	Public	26,776	Red Leafs	2023		men's swimming & diving	Great Northwest (GNAC)
Simon Fraser University	Burnaby, British Columbia	1965	Public	26,776	Red Leafs	2023		women's swimming & diving	Great Northwest (GNAC)
Simon Fraser University	Burnaby, British Columbia	1965	Public	26,776	Red Leafs	2023		women's wrestling	Great Northwest (GNAC)
University of Texas Permian Basin	Odessa, Texas	1973	Public	7,372	Falcons	2008; 2022 (Note: UT Permian Basin was previously an affiliate member of the RMAC for men's and women's swimming & diving from 2008–09 to 2012–13.)		men's swimming & diving	Lone Star (LSC)
University of Texas Permian Basin	Odessa, Texas	1973	Public	7,372	Falcons	2008; 2022		women's swimming & diving	Lone Star (LSC)
Texas Woman's University	Denton, Texas	1901	Public	15,361	Pioneers	2023		women's wrestling	Lone Star (LSC)

=== Former members ===
The RMAC had 21 former full members, all but three were public schools:

Institution	Location	Founded	Affiliation	Enrollment	Nickname	Joined (Note: Represents the calendar year when fall sports competition begins.)	Left (Note: Represents the calendar year when spring sports competition ends.)	Current conference
Brigham Young University	Provo, Utah	1875	LDS Church	34,100	Cougars	1918	1938	Big 12 (Note: Current NCAA Division I athletic conference)
University of Colorado Boulder	Boulder, Colorado	1876	Public	33,246	Buffaloes	1909	1938	Big 12
Colorado College	Colorado Springs, Colorado	1874	Nonsectarian	2,011	Tigers	1909; 1914	1910; 1967 (Note: Colorado College withdrew from the RMAC from 1910–11 to 1913–14.)	Southern (SCAC) (Note: Current NCAA Division III athletic conference.)
Colorado State University	Fort Collins, Colorado	1870	Public	34,166	Rams	1909	1938	Mountain West (MW) (Pac-12 in 2026)
University of Denver (Note: Denver was an affiliate member during the 1996–97 school year.)	Denver, Colorado	1864	Nonsectarian	11,952	Pioneers	1910	1938	Summit (WCC in 2026)
Emporia State University	Emporia, Kansas	1863	Public	5,887	Hornets	1967	1972	Mid-America (MIAA)
Fort Hays State University (Note: Fort Hays State competed in the RMAC as an affiliate member for wrestling from 2006–07 to 2011–12.)	Hays, Kansas	1902	Public	14,658	Tigers	1967; 1989	1972; 2006 (Note: Fort Hays State withdrew from the RMAC from 1972–73 to 1988–89.)	Mid-America (MIAA)
Idaho State University	Pocatello, Idaho	1901	Public	12,805	Bengals	1948	1958	Big Sky (BSC)
Montana State University	Bozeman, Montana	1893	Public	16,766	Bobcats	1917	1959	Big Sky (BSC)
University of Nebraska Omaha	Omaha, Nebraska	1908	Public	15,431	Mavericks	1967	1972	Summit
University of Nebraska at Kearney (Note: Nebraska–Kearney remains in the RMAC as an affiliate in women's swimming & diving.)	Kearney, Nebraska	1905	Public	7,504	Lopers	1989 (Note: Provisional member.); 1994	1990; 2012 (Note: Nebraska–Kearney withdrew from the RMAC from 1990–91 to 1993–94.)	Mid-America (MIAA)
University of Northern Colorado	Greeley, Colorado	1889	Public	12,862	Bears	1924	1972	Big Sky (BSC)
Pittsburg State University	Pittsburg, Kansas	1903	Public	7,102	Gorillas	1967	1972	Mid-America (MIAA)
Southern Utah University	Cedar City, Utah	1897	Public	10,196	Thunderbirds	1967	1986	Western (WAC) (Big Sky in 2026)
University of Utah	Salt Lake City, Utah	1850	Public	33,000	Utes	1910	1938	Big 12
Utah State University	Logan, Utah	1888	Public	27,691	Aggies	1915	1938	Mountain West (MW) (Pac-12 in 2026)
Utah Tech University (Note: Dixie State competed in the RMAC as an affiliate member for football from the 2016 to 2017 fall seasons (2016–17 to 2017–18 school years).) (Note: Dixie State officially changed its name to Utah Tech University as of July 1st, 2022.)	St. George, Utah	1911	Public	12,650	Trailblazers	2018	2020	Western (WAC) (Big Sky in 2026)
Washburn University	Topeka, Kansas	1865	Public	7,971	Ichabods	1967	1972	Mid-America (MIAA)
Wayne State College	Wayne, Nebraska	1910	Public	4,202	Wildcats	1989	1990	Northern Sun (NSIC)
Western New Mexico University	Silver City, New Mexico	1893	Public	3,820	Mustangs	1967; 2006	1990; 2016 (Note: Western New Mexico withdrew from the RMAC from 1990–91 to 2005–06.)	Lone Star (LSC)
University of Wyoming	Laramie, Wyoming	1886	Public	12,450	Cowboys	1921	1938	Mountain West (MW)

=== Former affiliate members ===
The RMAC had 11 former affiliate members, with all but four being private schools.

Institution	Location	Founded	Affiliation	Enrollment	Nickname	Joined (Note: Represents the calendar year when fall sports competition begins.)	Left (Note: Represents the calendar year when spring sports competition ends.)	RMAC sport(s)	Primary conference (Note: Except as noted, this matches the school's current affiliation in its former RMAC sports.)
California Baptist University	Riverside, California	1950	Baptist	11,491	Lancers	2013^{m.sw.}	2018^{m.sw.}	men's swimming & diving	Western (WAC) (Note: Current NCAA Division I athletic conference.) (Note: California Baptist was a men's wrestling member of the Big 12 Conference before dropping the sport after the 2025–26 season.) (Big West (BWC) in 2026)
California Baptist University	Riverside, California	1950	Baptist	11,491	Lancers	2013^{w.sw.}	2018^{w.sw.}	women's swimming & diving	Western (WAC) (Big West (BWC) in 2026)
California Baptist University	Riverside, California	1950	Baptist	11,491	Lancers	2013^{m.wr.}	2018^{m.wr.}	men's wrestling	Western (WAC) (Big West (BWC) in 2026)
Grand Canyon University	Phoenix, Arizona	1949	For-profit (Note: For-profit status is disputed. The U.S. Department of Education considers GCU for-profit, but the Internal Revenue Service, the state of Arizona, and the NCAA consider it nonprofit.) (Nondenominational)	25,000	Antelopes	2007^{m.wr.}	2013^{m.wr.}	men's wrestling	Mountain West (MW) (Note: Grand Canyon no longer sponsors men's wrestling. Men's swimming & diving is competing in the Mountain Pacific Sports Federation in the 2025–26 season, after which the MW will start sponsoring that sport.)
Grand Canyon University	Phoenix, Arizona	1949	For-profit (Nondenominational)	25,000	Antelopes	2008^{m.sw.}	2013^{m.sw.}	men's swimming & diving	Mountain West (MW)
Grand Canyon University	Phoenix, Arizona	1949	For-profit (Nondenominational)	25,000	Antelopes	2008^{w.sw.}	2013^{w.sw.}	women's swimming & diving	Mountain West (MW)
University of the Incarnate Word	San Antonio, Texas	1881	Catholic (CCIW)	9,366	Cardinals	2008^{m.sw.}	2013^{m.sw.}	men's swimming & diving	Southland (SLC) (Note: Incarnate Word (UIW) currently houses swimming & diving in the Mountain Pacific Sports Federation (MPSF).)
University of the Incarnate Word	San Antonio, Texas	1881	Catholic (CCIW)	9,366	Cardinals	2008^{w.sw.}	2013^{w.sw.}	women's swimming & diving	Southland (SLC)
Lindenwood University	St. Charles, Missouri	1827	Presbyterian	4,822	Lions	2013^{w.lax.}	2019^{w.lax.}	women's lacrosse	Ohio Valley (OVC) (Note: The OVC sponsors none of Lindenwood's former RMAC sports. All three sports currently compete in the Summit League.)
Lindenwood University	St. Charles, Missouri	1827	Presbyterian	4,822	Lions	2014^{m.sw.}	2016^{m.sw.}	men's swimming & diving	Ohio Valley (OVC)
Lindenwood University	St. Charles, Missouri	1827	Presbyterian	4,822	Lions	2014^{w.sw.}	2016^{w.sw.}	women's swimming & diving	Ohio Valley (OVC)
Maryville University	St. Louis, Missouri (Note: The university has a St. Louis mailing address, but the main campus is in Town and Country.)	1872	Catholic (Archdiocese of St. Louis)	5,504	Saints	2016	2017	men's lacrosse	Great Lakes Valley (GLVC)
Minnesota State University Moorhead	Moorhead, Minnesota	1887	Public	5,547	Dragons	2009	2012	women's swimming & diving	Northern Sun (NSIC)
Montana State University Billings	Billings, Montana	1927	Public	4,600	Yellowjackets	2007^{m.ten.}	2015^{m.ten.}	men's tennis	Great Northwest (GNAC) (Note: MSU Billings no longer sponsors tennis.)
Montana State University Billings	Billings, Montana	1927	Public	4,600	Yellowjackets	2007^{w.ten.}	2015^{w.ten.}	women's tennis	Great Northwest (GNAC)
Northern State University	Aberdeen, South Dakota	1901	Public	3,431	Wolves	2009	2012	women's swimming & diving	Northern Sun (NSIC)
Oklahoma Baptist University	Shawnee, Oklahoma	1910	Baptist	2,097	Bison	2016^{w.lax.}	2020^{w.lax.}	women's lacrosse	Great American (GAC) (Note: Oklahoma Baptist no longer sponsors women's lacrosse.)
Oklahoma Baptist University	Shawnee, Oklahoma	1910	Baptist	2,097	Bison	2016^{m.sw.}	2020^{m.sw.}	men's swimming & diving	Great American (GAC)
Oklahoma Baptist University	Shawnee, Oklahoma	1910	Baptist	2,097	Bison	2016^{w.sw.}	2020^{w.sw.}	women's swimming & diving	Great American (GAC)
Rockhurst University	Kansas City, Missouri	1910	Catholic (Society of Jesus)	2,746	Hawks	2013^{w.lax.}	2019^{w.lax.}	women's lacrosse	Great Lakes Valley (GLVC)
Rockhurst University	Kansas City, Missouri	1910	Catholic (Society of Jesus)	2,746	Hawks	2015^{m.lax.}	2018^{m.lax.}	men's lacrosse	Great Lakes Valley (GLVC)
San Francisco State University	San Francisco, California	1899	Public	30,155	Gators	1997	2024	men's wrestling	California (CCAA) (Note: The CCAA does not sponsor men's wrestling. San Francisco State competes in the Mountain Pacific Sports Federation for that sport only.)
Simon Fraser University	Burnaby, British Columbia	1965	Public	26,776	Red Leafs	2023	2025	men's wrestling	Great Northwest (GNAC) (Note: Simon Fraser plans to leave the NCAA and rejoin Canada's governing body of U Sports as a member of the Canada West Universities Athletic Association in 2027.)

=== Membership timeline ===
A total of 54 different schools have been associated with the RMAC, either through full or associate membership. Of those schools, only Colorado Mines has been with the conference every year since it was founded in 1909.

Full member (all sports) Full member (non-football) Associate member (football) Associate member (sport)

== Sponsored sports ==
Conference sports
Sport	Men's	Women's
Baseball	✓	
Basketball	✓	✓
Cross Country	✓	✓
Football	✓	
Golf	✓	✓
Lacrosse	✓	✓
Soccer	✓	✓
Softball		✓
Swimming & Diving	✓	✓
Track & Field Indoor	✓	✓
Track & Field Outdoor	✓	✓
Volleyball		✓
Wrestling	✓	✓

=== Men's sponsored sports by school ===
School	Baseball	Basketball	Cross Country	Football	Golf	Lacrosse	Soccer	Swimming & Diving	Track & Field Indoor	Track & Field Outdoor	Wrestling	Total RMAC Sports
Adams State	✓	✓	✓	✓		✓	✓	✓	✓	✓	✓	10
Black Hills State		✓	✓	✓					✓	✓		5
Chadron State		✓	✓	✓					✓	✓	✓	6
Colorado Christian	✓	✓	✓		✓		✓		✓	✓		6
Colorado Mesa	✓	✓	✓	✓	✓	✓	✓	✓	✓	✓	✓	11
Colorado Mines	✓	✓	✓	✓	✓		✓	✓	✓	✓	✓	10
CSU Pueblo	✓	✓	✓	✓	✓		✓		✓	✓	✓	9
Fort Lewis		✓	✓	✓	✓		✓		✓	✓		5
MSU Denver	✓	✓	✓				✓		✓	✓		7
New Mexico Highlands	✓	✓	✓	✓							✓	5
Regis	✓	✓	✓		✓		✓					5
South Dakota Mines		✓	✓	✓	✓		✓		✓	✓		7
UCCS	✓	✓	✓				✓		✓	✓		6
Western Colorado		✓	✓	✓					✓	✓	✓	6
Westminster		✓	✓		✓	✓	✓		✓	✓		7
Totals	9	15	15	10	9	3+3	11	3+3	13	13	7	105
Affiliate Members
Concordia–Irvine						✓						1
Dominican						✓						1
Northwest Nazarene						✓						1
Oklahoma Christian								✓				1
Simon Fraser								✓				1
UT Permian Basin								✓				1

=== Women's sponsored sports by school ===
School	Basketball	Cross Country	Golf	Lacrosse	Soccer	Softball	Swimming & Diving	Track & Field Indoor	Track & Field Outdoor	Volleyball	Wrestling ^{‡}	Total RMAC Sports
Adams State	✓	✓	✓		✓	✓	✓	✓	✓	✓	✓	10
Black Hills State	✓	✓	✓		✓	✓		✓	✓	✓		8
Chadron State	✓	✓	✓			✓		✓	✓	✓	✓	8
Colorado Christian	✓	✓	✓		✓	✓		✓	✓	✓		7
Colorado Mesa	✓	✓	✓	✓	✓	✓	✓	✓	✓	✓	✓	11
Colorado Mines	✓	✓			✓	✓	✓	✓	✓	✓		8
CSU Pueblo	✓	✓	✓	✓	✓	✓	✓	✓	✓	✓		10
Fort Lewis	✓	✓	✓	✓	✓	✓		✓	✓	✓		9
MSU Denver	✓	✓	✓		✓	✓		✓	✓	✓		8
New Mexico Highlands	✓	✓			✓	✓		✓	✓	✓		7
Regis	✓	✓	✓	✓	✓	✓				✓		7
South Dakota Mines	✓	✓	✓					✓	✓	✓		6
UCCS	✓	✓		✓	✓	✓		✓	✓	✓		8
Western Colorado	✓	✓			✓		✓	✓	✓	✓	(Note: Western Colorado will add women's wrestling in 2026–27.)	7
Westminster	✓	✓	✓	✓	✓			✓	✓	✓		8
Totals	15	15	12	6	13	12	5+4	14	14	15	3+2	121
Affiliate Members
Nebraska–Kearney							✓					1
Oklahoma Christian							✓					1
Simon Fraser							✓				✓	2
Texas Woman's											✓	1
UT Permian Basin							✓					1

=== Other sponsored sports by school ===
School	Men	Women		Co-ed
School	Tennis	Beach Volleyball ^{‡}	Tennis	Skiing ^{‡}
Colorado Mesa	PacWest	IND	PacWest	
Westminster				RMISA

- ^{‡} — De facto D-I sport

== Conference facilities ==
School	Football		Basketball	
School	Stadium	Capacity	Arena	Capacity
Adams State	Rex Stadium	2,800	Plachy Hall	500
Black Hills State	Lyle Hare Stadium	4,200	Donald E. Young Center	3,500
Chadron State	Elliott Field at Don Beebe Stadium	3,500	Chicoine Center	1,750
Colorado Christian	non-football school		Colorado Christian Event Center	1,500
Colorado Mesa	Stocker Stadium	8,000	Brownson Arena	1,800
Colorado Mines	Campbell Field	4,090	Lockridge Arena	3,000
CSU Pueblo	Neta and Eddie DeRose ThunderBowl	6,500	Massari Arena	3,900
Fort Lewis	Ray Dennison Memorial Field	4,000	Whalen Gymnasium	2,750
MSU Denver	non-football school		Auraria Event Center	2,300
New Mexico Highlands	Perkins Stadium	5,000	Wilson Complex	4,250
Regis	non-football school		Regis Field House	1,800
South Dakota Mines	O'Harra Stadium	4,000	King Center	3,000
UCCS	non-football school		Gallogly Events Center	1,250
Western Colorado	Mountaineer Bowl	4,000	Paul Wright Gymnasium	1,800
Westminster	non-football school		Behnken Field House	1,200
