= Southern Intercollegiate Athletic Conference =

Collegiate athletic conference

- Association: NCAA
- Founded: 1913
- Commissioner: Anthony L. Holloman (since September 2022)
- Sports fielded: 14; men's: 8; women's: 6
- Division: Division II
- No. of teams: 15 (14 in 2027)
- Headquarters: Atlanta, Georgia
- Region: Southeastern United States and Ohio
- Website: thesiac.com

Locations
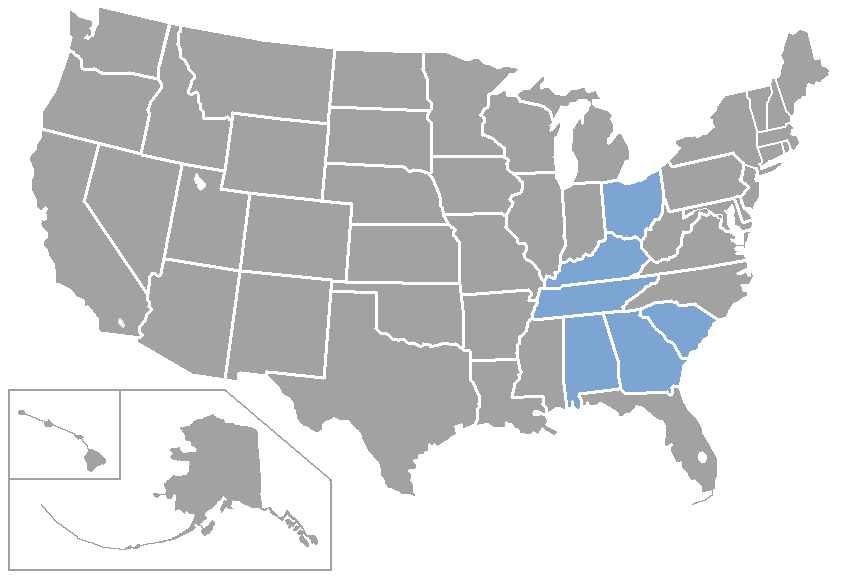

The Southern Intercollegiate Athletic Conference (SIAC) is a college athletic conference affiliated with the National Collegiate Athletic Association (NCAA) at the Division II level. Formed in 1913, it consists mostly of historically black colleges and universities (HBCUs), with all but one member located in the Southern United States.

As of 2013, the SIAC has the highest football attendance of all NCAA Division II conferences.

== History ==
Southern Intercollegiate Athletic Conference
Location of SIAC members: current, departing

Only three charter members are still part of the conference—Clark Atlanta University (formerly Clark College), Tuskegee University, and Morehouse (which briefly left before returning). Before 2014, all members had been southern HBCUs, but four of the SIAC's five newest members include its only non-HBCU, Spring Hill College (joined in 2014), and its only member outside the South, Central State University of Ohio (joined in 2015). Their last three recent members were former member schools in their first stints: Savannah State University returned to the SIAC in 2019 after a 19-year absence, Allen University returned to the SIAC in 2020 after a 51-year absence, and Edward Waters University returned to the SIAC in 2021 after a nearly 86-year absence. The U.S. Army's 24th Infantry Division teams competed as members of the SIAC from 1930 until 1935.

On March 31, 2021, Paine College left the SIAC and the NCAA and joined the NCCAA.

=== Chronological timeline ===
- 1913 – The Southern Intercollegiate Athletic Conference (SIAC) was founded as the Southeastern Intercollegiate Athletic Conference (SEIAC). Charter members involved Lincoln Junior College (now Alabama State University), Atlanta University, Clark College, Fisk University, Jackson College (now Jackson State University), Morris Brown College, Morehouse College, Talladega College and Tuskegee University, beginning the 1913–14 academic year.
- 1914 – Jackson State left the SIAC after spending just one season after the 1913–14 academic year.
- 1920 – Florida Agricultural and Mechanical College (now Florida Agricultural and Mechanical University), Knoxville College, and Tennessee Agricultural & Industrial State Normal College (Tennessee A&I; now Tennessee State University) joined the SIAC in the 1920–21 academic year.
- 1927 – Miles Memorial College (now Miles College) joined the SIAC in the 1927–28 academic year.
- 1929:
  - Atlanta University left the SIAC after the 1928–29 academic year.
  - The SEIAC has been rebranded as the Southern Intercollegiate Athletic Conference (SIAC) in the 1929–30 academic year.
  - Lane College joined the SIAC in the 1929–30 academic year.
- 1930:
  - Tennessee State left the SIAC after the 1929–30 academic year.
  - Edward Waters College (now Edward Waters University) joined the SIAC in the 1930–31 academic year.
- 1932 – Benedict College and LeMoyne College (now LeMoyne–Owen College) joined the SIAC in the 1932–33 academic year.
- 1935:
  - Edward Waters left the SIAC after the 1934–35 academic year.
  - The Normal Industrial Agricultural and Mechanical College of South Carolina (now South Carolina State University) and Xavier University of Louisiana joined the SIAC in the 1935–36 academic year.
- 1941:
  - Talladega left the SIAC after the 1940–41 academic year.
  - Fort Valley State College (now Fort Valley State University) joined the SIAC in the 1941–42 academic year.
- 1947 – Alabama Agricultural and Mechanical College (now Alabama Agricultural and Mechanical University; a.k.a. Alabama A&M) and Allen University joined the SIAC in the 1947–48 academic year.
- 1950 – Bethune–Cookman College (now Bethune–Cookman University) joined the SIAC in the 1950–51 academic year.
- 1960 – Xavier (La.) left the SIAC after the 1959–60 academic year.
- 1969
  - Allen left the SIAC after the 1968–69 academic year.
  - Albany State College (now Albany State University) and Savannah State College (now Savannah State University) joined the SIAC in the 1969–70 academic year.
- 1971 – South Carolina State left the SIAC after the 1970–71 academic year.
- 1976 – Alabama State left the SIAC after the 1975–76 academic year.
- 1978 – Rust College and Stillman College joined the SIAC in the 1978–79 academic year.
- 1979 – Bethune–Cookman and Florida A&M left the SIAC to join the MEAC after the 1978–79 academic year.
- 1983 – Fisk left the SIAC after the 1982–83 academic year.
- 1985 – Paine College joined the SIAC in the 1985–86 academic year.
- 1988 – Rust left the SIAC after the 1987–88 academic year.
- 1990 – Knoxville left the SIAC after the 1989–90 academic year.
- 1997 – Kentucky State University joined the SIAC in the 1997–98 academic year.
- 1998 – Alabama A&M left the SIAC to join Division I ranks of the National Collegiate Athletic Association (NCAA) and the Southwestern Athletic Conference (SWAC) after the 1997–98 academic year.
- 1999 – Stillman left the SIAC to join the NCAA Division III ranks and the Great South Athletic Conference (GSAC) after the 1998–99 academic year.
- 2000 – Morris Brown and Savannah State left the SIAC to become NCAA D-II Independents after the 1999–2000 academic year.
- 2002 – Stillman rejoined the SIAC in the 2002–03 academic year.
- 2008 – Claflin University joined the SIAC in the 2008–09 academic year.
- 2013 – Central State University joined the SIAC as an associate member for football in the 2013 fall season (2013–14 academic year).
- 2014 – Spring Hill College joined the SIAC in the 2014–15 academic year.
- 2015 – Central State had upgraded to join the SIAC for all sports in the 2015–16 academic year.
- 2016 – Stillman left the SIAC for a second time to join the Southern States Athletic Conference (SSAC) of the National Association of Intercollegiate Athletics (NAIA) ranks after the 2015–16 academic year.
- 2018 – Claflin left the SIAC to join the Central Intercollegiate Athletic Association (CIAA) after the 2017–18 academic year.
- 2019 – Savannah State rejoined the SIAC as a provisional member in the 2019–20 academic year; which would later gain full member status in 2020–21.
- 2020 – Allen rejoined the SIAC as a provisional member in the 2020–21 academic year; which would later gain full member status in 2022–23.
- 2021:
  - Paine left the SIAC and the NCAA to join as an Independent within the National Christian Collegiate Athletic Association (NCCAA) after the 2020–21 academic year.
  - Edward Waters rejoined the SIAC as a provisional member in the 2021–22 academic year; which would later gain full member status in 2022–23.
- 2027 – Spring Hill will leave the SIAC to join the Gulf South Conference (GSC) after the 2026–27 academic year.

== Member schools ==
=== Current members ===
The SIAC currently has 15 full members; all but five are private schools. Only Spring Hill, leaving in 2027, is not an HBCU.

Institution	Location	Founded	Affiliation	Enrollment	Nickname	Joined (Note: Represents the calendar year when fall sports competition begins.)	Colors
Albany State University	Albany, Georgia	1903	Public	6,809	Golden Rams	1969	
Allen University	Columbia, South Carolina	1870	AME Church	657	Yellow Jackets	1947; 2020 (Note: Allen left the SIAC after the 1968–69 school year; but re-joined in the 2020–21 school year.)	
Benedict College	Columbia, South Carolina	1870	Baptist	1,746	Tigers	1932	
Central State University	Wilberforce, Ohio	1887	Public	2,719	Marauders & Lady Marauders	2015 (Note: Central State competed in the SIAC as an affiliate member for football from the 2013 to 2014 fall seasons (2013–14 to 2014–15 school years).)	
Clark Atlanta University	Atlanta, Georgia	1988 (Note: Merger of Atlanta University (1865) and Clark College (1869) in 1988.)	United; Methodist	4,252	Panthers	1913 (Note: Both Clark and Atlanta were founding members; Atlanta University left in 1929.)	
Edward Waters University	Jacksonville, Florida	1866	AME Church	1,177	Tigers	1930; 2021 (Note: Edward Waters left the SIAC after the 1934–35 school year; but re-joined in the 2021–22 school year.)	
Fort Valley State University	Fort Valley, Georgia	1895	Public	2,905	Wildcats	1941	
Kentucky State University	Frankfort, Kentucky	1886	Public	1,932	Thorobreds & Thorobrettes	1997	
Lane College	Jackson, Tennessee	1882	CME Church	822	Dragons	1929	
LeMoyne–Owen College	Memphis, Tennessee	1862	United Church of Christ	613	Magicians	1932	
Miles College	Fairfield, Alabama	1898	CME Church	1,489	Golden Bears	1927	
Morehouse College (Note: This institution is a men's college, therefore it does not field women's sports.)	Atlanta, Georgia	1867	Nonsectarian	2,206	Maroon Tigers	1913	
Savannah State University	Savannah, Georgia	1890	Public	3,208	Tigers	1969; 2019 (Note: Savannah State left the SIAC after the 1999–2000 school year; but re-joined in the 2019–20 school year.)	
Spring Hill College	Mobile, Alabama	1830	Catholic	920	Badgers	2014	
Tuskegee University	Tuskegee, Alabama	1881	Nonsectarian	3,121	Golden Tigers	1913	

=== Affiliate members ===
Institution	Location	Founded	Affiliation	Enrollment	Nickname	Joined (Note: Represents the calendar year when fall sports competition begins.)	Colors	SIAC sport(s)	Current conference
Virginia State University	Ettrick, Virginia	1882	Public	5,605	Trojans	2026		men's tennis	Central (CIAA)

=== Former members ===
The SIAC has 17 former full members. All were HBCUs, and all but six were private schools.

Institution	Location	Founded	Affiliation	Nickname	Joined (Note: Represents the calendar year when fall sports competition begins.)	Left (Note: Represents the calendar year when spring sports competition ends.)	Current conference
Alabama A&M University (Note: Alabama A&M's full name is Alabama Agricultural and Mechanical University.)	Normal, Alabama	1875	Public	Bulldogs & Lady Bulldogs	1947	1998	Southwestern (SWAC) (Note: Currently an NCAA Division I athletic conference.)
Alabama State University	Montgomery, Alabama	1867	Public	Hornets	1913	1976	Southwestern (SWAC)
Bethune–Cookman University	Daytona Beach, Florida	1904	Nonsectarian	Wildcats	1950	1979	Southwestern (SWAC)
Claflin University	Orangeburg, South Carolina	1869	United; Methodist	Panthers	2008	2018	Central (CIAA)
Fisk University	Nashville, Tennessee	1866	United Church of Christ	Bulldogs	1913	1983	HBCU (HBCUAC) (Note: Currently an NAIA athletic conference.)
Florida A&M University	Tallahassee, Florida	1887	Public	Rattlers	1920	1979	Southwestern (SWAC)
Jackson State University	Jackson, Mississippi	1877	Public	Tigers	1913	1914	Southwestern (SWAC)
Knoxville College	Knoxville, Tennessee	1875	Presbyterian	Bulldogs	1920	1990	N/A (Note: Knoxville dropped its athletics program after the 1996–97 school year.)
Morris Brown College	Atlanta, Georgia	1881	AME Church	Wolverines	1913	2000	N/A (Note: Morris Brown dropped its athletics program after the 2002–03 school year.)
Paine College	Augusta, Georgia	1882	United Methodist & CME Church	Lions	1985	2021	NCCAA Independent
Rust College	Holly Springs, Mississippi	1866	United; Methodist	Bearcats	1978	1988	HBCU (HBCUAC)
South Carolina State University	Orangeburg, South Carolina	1896	Public	Bulldogs	1935	1971	Mid-Eastern (MEAC)
Stillman College	Tuscaloosa, Alabama	1874	Presbyterian	Tigers	1978; 2002	1999; 2016 (Note: Stillman withdrew from the SIAC from 1999–2000 to 2001–02.)	HBCU (HBCUAC)
Talladega College	Talladega, Alabama	1867	United Church of Christ	Tornadoes	1913	1941	HBCU (HBCUAC)
Tennessee State University	Nashville, Tennessee	1912	Public	Tigers	1920	1930	Ohio Valley (OVC)
Xavier University of Louisiana	New Orleans, Louisiana	1925	Catholic (S.B.S.)	Gold Rush & Gold Nuggets	1935	1960	Red River (RRAC)

=== Membership timeline ===
Full member (all sports) Full member (non-football) Associate member (football) Associate member (sport)

== Conference facilities ==
Old SIAC logo

School	Football		Basketball	
School	Stadium	Capacity	Arena	Capacity
Albany State	Albany State University Coliseum	11,000	HPER Gym Complex	4,000
Allen	Various	Varies	John Hurst Adams Gym	N/A
Benedict	Charlie W. Johnson Stadium	11,000	Benjamin E. Mays Arena	3,500
Central State	McPherson Stadium	7,000	Beacom/Lewis Gymnasium	N/A
Clark Atlanta	Panther Stadium	6,000	L. S. Epps Gym	1,800
Edward Waters	Nathaniel Glover Community Field & Stadium	N/A	John Hurst Adams-Jimmy R. Jenkins Community Sports & Music Complex	1,950
Fort Valley State	Wildcat Stadium	10,000	Health and Physical Education Complex (FVSU)	5,100
Kentucky State	Alumni Field	5,000	William Exum HPER Center	2,750
Lane	Rothrock Stadium	3,500	J.F. Lane Center	2,500
LeMoyne–Owen	non-football school		Bruce Hall	1,000
Miles	Alumni Stadium	8,500	Knox-Windham Gym	2,000
Morehouse	B. T. Harvey Stadium	9,850	Forbes Arena	6,000
Savannah State	Ted Wright Stadium	8,500	Tiger Arena	5,000
Spring Hill	non-football school		Arthur R. Outlaw Recreation Center	2,000
Tuskegee	Abbott Memorial Alumni Stadium	10,000	James Center Arena	5,000

== Sports ==
The SIAC currently sponsors 14 sports, eight for men and six for women. Men's volleyball, a Division I sport, became the 14th SIAC sport in the 2020–21 school year; play was intended to start in January 2021 but was delayed to 2022 due to COVID-19 issues.

A divisional format is used for baseball, men's and women's basketball, softball, and women's volleyball.
East
- Albany State
- Allen
- Benedict
- Clark Atlanta
- Edward Waters
- Fort Valley State
- Morehouse
- Savannah State
West
- Central State
- Kentucky State
- Lane
- LeMoyne–Owen
- Miles
- Spring Hill
- Tuskegee

Teams in Southern Intercollegiate Athletic Conference competition
Sport	Men's	Women's
Baseball	12	–
Basketball	15	14
Cross country	15	14
Football	13	–
Golf	8	–
Softball	–	13
Tennis	7	9
Track & Field Indoor	10	9
Track & Field Outdoor	12	13
Volleyball	7	14

=== Men's sponsored sports by school ===
School	Baseball	Basketball	Cross Country	Football	Golf	Tennis	Track & Field Indoor	Track & Field Outdoor	Volleyball (Note: De facto Division I sport. The NCAA sponsors a combined national championship for Divisions I and II.)	Total SIAC Sports
Albany State	Yes	Yes	Yes	Yes	Yes	No	Yes	Yes	No	7
Allen	No	Yes	Yes	Yes	No	No	Yes	Yes	No	5
Benedict	Yes	Yes	Yes	Yes	Yes	Yes	Yes	Yes	Yes	9
Central State	No	Yes	Yes	Yes	No	No	Yes	Yes	Yes	6
Clark Atlanta	Yes	Yes	Yes	Yes	No	No	No	No	No	4
Edward Waters	Yes	Yes	Yes	Yes	No	No	Yes	Yes	Yes	7
Fort Valley State	No	Yes	Yes	Yes	No	No	No	Yes	Yes	5
Kentucky State	Yes	Yes	Yes	Yes	Yes	No	Yes	Yes	Yes	8
Lane	Yes	Yes	Yes	Yes	No	No	Yes	Yes	No	6
LeMoyne–Owen	Yes	Yes	Yes	No	Yes	Yes	No	No	No	5
Miles	Yes	Yes	Yes	Yes	Yes	No	No	No	No	5
Morehouse	Yes	Yes	Yes	Yes	Yes	No	Yes	Yes	Yes	8
Savannah State	Yes	Yes	Yes	Yes	Yes	No	Yes	Yes	No	7
Spring Hill	Yes	Yes	Yes	No	Yes	Yes	No	Yes	No	6
Tuskegee	Yes	Yes	Yes	Yes	No	Yes	Yes	Yes	No	7
Totals	12	15	15	13	8	4+1 (Note: Affiliate member Virginia State.)	10	12	6	96+1

Men's varsity sports not sponsored by the Southern Intercollegiate Athletic Conference which are played by SIAC schools:

School	Soccer	Wrestling
Allen		CC
Spring Hill	GSC	
Tuskegee	IND	

=== Women's sponsored sports by school ===
School	Basketball	Cross Country	Softball	Tennis	Track & Field Indoor	Track & Field Outdoor	Volleyball	Total SIAC Sports
Albany State	Yes	Yes	Yes	Yes	Yes	Yes	Yes	7
Allen	Yes	Yes	Yes	No	Yes	Yes	Yes	6
Benedict	Yes	Yes	Yes	Yes	Yes	Yes	Yes	7
Central State	Yes	Yes	No	No	Yes	Yes	Yes	5
Clark Atlanta	Yes	Yes	Yes	Yes	No	Yes	Yes	6
Edward Waters	Yes	Yes	Yes	No	Yes	Yes	Yes	6
Fort Valley State	Yes	Yes	Yes	Yes	No	Yes	Yes	6
Kentucky State	Yes	Yes	Yes	No	Yes	Yes	Yes	6
Lane	Yes	Yes	Yes	Yes	Yes	Yes	Yes	7
LeMoyne–Owen	Yes	Yes	Yes	Yes	No	No	Yes	5
Miles	Yes	Yes	Yes	No	No	Yes	Yes	5
Savannah State	Yes	Yes	Yes	Yes	Yes	Yes	Yes	7
Spring Hill	Yes	Yes	Yes	Yes	No	Yes	Yes	6
Tuskegee	Yes	Yes	Yes	Yes	Yes	Yes	Yes	7
Totals	14	14	13	9	9	13	14	86

Women's varsity sports not sponsored by the Southern Intercollegiate Athletic Conference which are played by SIAC schools:

School	Beach Volleyball (Note: De facto Division I sport. In both beach volleyball and wrestling, the NCAA currently operates a single championship event open to members of all three divisions. The introduction of a separate Division III women's wrestling championship in 2027–28 will not change the sport's status with respect to Division II.)	Golf	Soccer	Wrestling
Allen			IND	CC (Note: De facto Conference Carolinas affiliate as part of South Atlantic Conference Carolinas.)
Clark Atlanta		PBC		
Edward Waters		PBC	IND	
Savannah State		PBC		
Spring Hill	IND	GSC	GSC	
Tuskegee			IND	

== Championships ==
=== Commissioner's All-Sports ===
Year	School
2012–2013	Albany State (W); Morehouse (M)
2013–2014	Albany State (W); Morehouse (M)
2014–2015	Benedict (W); Benedict (M)
2015–2016	Benedict (W); Benedict (M)
2016–2017	Benedict (W); Albany State (M)
2017–2018	Albany State (W); Albany State (M)
2018–2019	Spring Hill College (W); Albany State and Miles (M)
2021–2022	Benedict (W); Benedict (M)
2022–2023	Benedict (W); Benedict (M)
2023–2024	Spring Hill College (W); Benedict (M)
2024–2025	Tuskegee (W); Morehouse (M)
2025–2026	Morehouse (M)

=== Men's sports ===
Last three years of champions.

Year	Football	Cross Country	Basketball (Tournament)	Baseball	Tennis	Track & Field Outdoor	Golf	Volleyball
2023–24	Benedict	Morehouse	Clark Atlanta	Edward Waters	Spring Hill	Benedict	Miles	Fort Valley State
2024–25	Miles	Morehouse	Savannah State	Albany State	Spring Hill	Benedict	Spring Hill	Fort Valley State
2025–26	Albany State	Morehouse	Morehouse	Edward Waters	Tuskegee	Morehouse	Miles	Fort Valley State

- Golf returned as a conference sport in 2008. The first SIAC Intercollegiate Golf Championship was held at Tuskegee in 1938. The SIAC stopped Golf as a sport due to World War II but restarted in 1947 as an official conference sport until 1980 when golf was discontinued.

=== Basketball championships ===
Following is the official list of all men's basketball tournament champions, from the SIAC Media Guide:

Year	School
1989–1990	Morehouse
1990–1991	Morehouse
1991–1992	Albany State
1992–1993	Alabama A&M
1993–1994	Paine
1994–1995	Alabama A&M
1995–1996	Alabama A&M
1996–1997	Albany State
1997–1998	Fort Valley State
1998–1999	Paine
1999–2000	LeMoyne-Owen
2000–2001	Kentucky State
2001–2002	Paine
2002–2003	Morehouse
2003–2004	Benedict
2004–2005	Lane
2005–2006	Stillman
2006–2007	Albany State
2007–2008	Benedict
2008–2009	LeMoyne-Owen
2009–2010	Tuskegee
2010–2011	Clark Atlanta
2011–2012	Benedict
2012–2013	Benedict
2013–2014	Tuskegee
2014–2015	Benedict
2015–2016	Stillman
2016–2017	Clark Atlanta
2017–2018	Claflin
2018–2019	Miles
2019–2020	Miles
2020–2021*	n/a
2021–2022	Savannah State
2022–2023	Miles
2023–2024	Clark Atlanta
2024–2025	Savannah State
2025–2026	Morehouse

=== Women's sports ===
Last three years of champions.

Year	Volleyball	Cross Country	Basketball (Tournament)	Softball	Tennis	Track & Field Outdoor
2023–24	Spring Hill	Benedict	Miles	Spring Hill	Tuskegee	Albany State
2024–25	Spring Hill	Albany State	Miles	Spring Hill	Tuskegee	Tuskegee
2025–26	Spring Hill	Albany State	Miles	Spring Hill	Tuskegee	Tuskegee

== See also ==
- Pioneer Bowl (HBCU)
