= Halenbeck Hall =

Sports venue in St. Cloud, Minnesota, United States

- Interactive map of Halenbeck Hall
- Location: St. Cloud, Minnesota
- Coordinates: 45.5486°N 94.1519°W
- Owner: St. Cloud State University
- Capacity: over 6,400

Construction
- Groundbreaking: 1963
- Opened: 1965
- Renovated: 2001
- Expanded: 1980
- Cost: $2.235 million (1964)
- Architects: Traynor Hermanson & Hahn Architects (original); Sovik, Mathre, Sathrum, and Quanbeck Architects (1980)
- General contractors: Conlon Construction (1965); Donlar Construction (1980)

Tenants
- St. Cloud State men's basketball St. Cloud State women's basketball St. Cloud State women's volleyball St. Cloud State men's track & field (until 2016); St. Cloud State women's track & field St. Cloud State men's wrestling St. Cloud Tech Basketball (1993-2009); St. Cloud Rock'n Rollers (IBA) (1995–1996)

Website
- St. Cloud State's Halenbeck Hall

Halenbeck Hall is a multipurpose arena and athletic complex in St. Cloud, Minnesota, on the campus of St. Cloud State University. The arena sits over 6,400 and is home to the St. Cloud State basketball, volleyball, and wrestling teams. The facility also includes the Halenbeck Hall Aquatics Center, home to swimming and diving (capacity: 500), and the Halenbeck Hall South Fieldhouse, home of women's track and field. The St. Cloud State Huskies are in the Northern Sun Intercollegiate Conference of NCAA Division II.

== History ==
In 1964, Halenbeck Hall was given its name after Dr. Philip L. Halenbeck, a St. Cloud-based physician. Dr. Halenbeck provided funds for St. Cloud State's first academic scholarships and also assisted in fundraising for the Atwood Memorial College Center which was completed in 1966. Halenbeck Hall replaced the 1,100-seat Eastman Hall, SCSU's basketball court from 1930 until 1965. Technical High School conducted their graduation exercise, the facility's first event, on June 3, 1965, with an estimated 4,000 in attendance. The original capacity of the venue was 8,000, although later estimates listed 7,500. The first men's basketball game was played on November 19, 1965, as the Huskies defeated Southern State (SD), 91–70, with an attendance of 3,838. The first intercollegiate swimming meet was held on January 21, 1966, between St. Cloud State and the Bemidji State Beavers, which also marked the beginning of the SCSU men's swimming program.

Halenbeck Hall has hosted many high school games and tournaments. It was home to the annual Granite City Classic, a concurrent high school and college basketball tournament, from 1965 to 1981. Halenbeck also served as the home venue for community college and semi-pro basketball teams. St. Cloud Technical and Community College began using Halenbeck Hall as their home basketball court in 1993. They moved to the Whitney Recreation Center in 2009. The St. Cloud Rock'n Rollers played their home games at Halenbeck for the 1995–96 season, later folding after only one year of existence.

Halenbeck Hall received a $700,000 renovation that was completed in the summer of 2001. The new features included renovated bleachers (plus chair back seats), a new gym floor, a scoreboard, and a sound system. In 2019, part of Eastman Hall's gym floor was hung inside the walls of Halenbeck Hall. In early 2026, the Huskies Academic Center, a dedicated academic, advisory, and mental health wellness center for Husky student-athletes, opened inside Halenbeck. The Wrestling Center was dedicated to Grant and Carol Nelson, decades-long supporters of SCSU men's wrestling, in a ceremony on April 25, 2026.

== 1980 expansion ==
On February 25, 1976, the Minnesota Senate Financial Committee accepted St. Cloud's State's request for $4 million to expand Halenbeck, but rejected their request for $250,000 (later reduced to $150,000 by a legislative committee) to fund construction planning. The House Appropriations Committee later approved the request on March 17 but was not included in a Senate statewide building bill on March 22. The $150,000 request for expansion funding was formally struck down on April 5. Senator Norbert P. Arnold suggested St. Cloud State "...come back and ask again two years from now (1978)" and, in response to the inadequate amount of physical education space compared to the large student body, also stated: "...we will have less jocks per square inch in St. Cloud than at the other state universities." The 1976 proposed expansion would have added 94,500 square feet to Halenbeck, which at the time was a 67,000-square foot facility. In November 1976, the university upped the amount for expansion planning back to $250 thousand, but would not seek a request from state legislature until 1978.

Governor Rudy Perpich recommended in March 1977 that $3.55 million be allocated to spend on the facility's expansion, along with $250,000 on expansion planning, but the measure was not granted approval the following May. The expansion sought to include athletic facilities such as an indoor running track, women's locker rooms, and handball courts. The amount in expansion planning raised from $3.55 million to $4.11 million in October 1977. On March 23, 1978, state legislature approved a bill that would give St. Cloud State University $213,000 for planning funds on an 85,000 square foot addition to Halenbeck Hall. The bill also gave the university nearly $780,000 for other projects.

A bill funding the expansion was passed on May 21, 1979, in an amount exceeding $4 million. Construction on the new addition located south of the existing structure, which was originally listed as a 60,000+ square foot, $4.7 million expansion, commenced on August 8, 1979. Expansion features included a 200-meter indoor running track, four basketball courts, six tennis courts, and the addition of women's locker rooms. A formal dedication was held on December 2, 1980, with Dr. George A. Sheehan attending as a guest speaker at the new facility expansion that was upped to $5 million and 86,900 square feet. The new facility was named Halenbeck Hall South.

Halenbeck Hall South Fieldhouse was resurfaced in 2007 and is currently the home of SCSU women's indoor track & field.

== Concerts and events ==
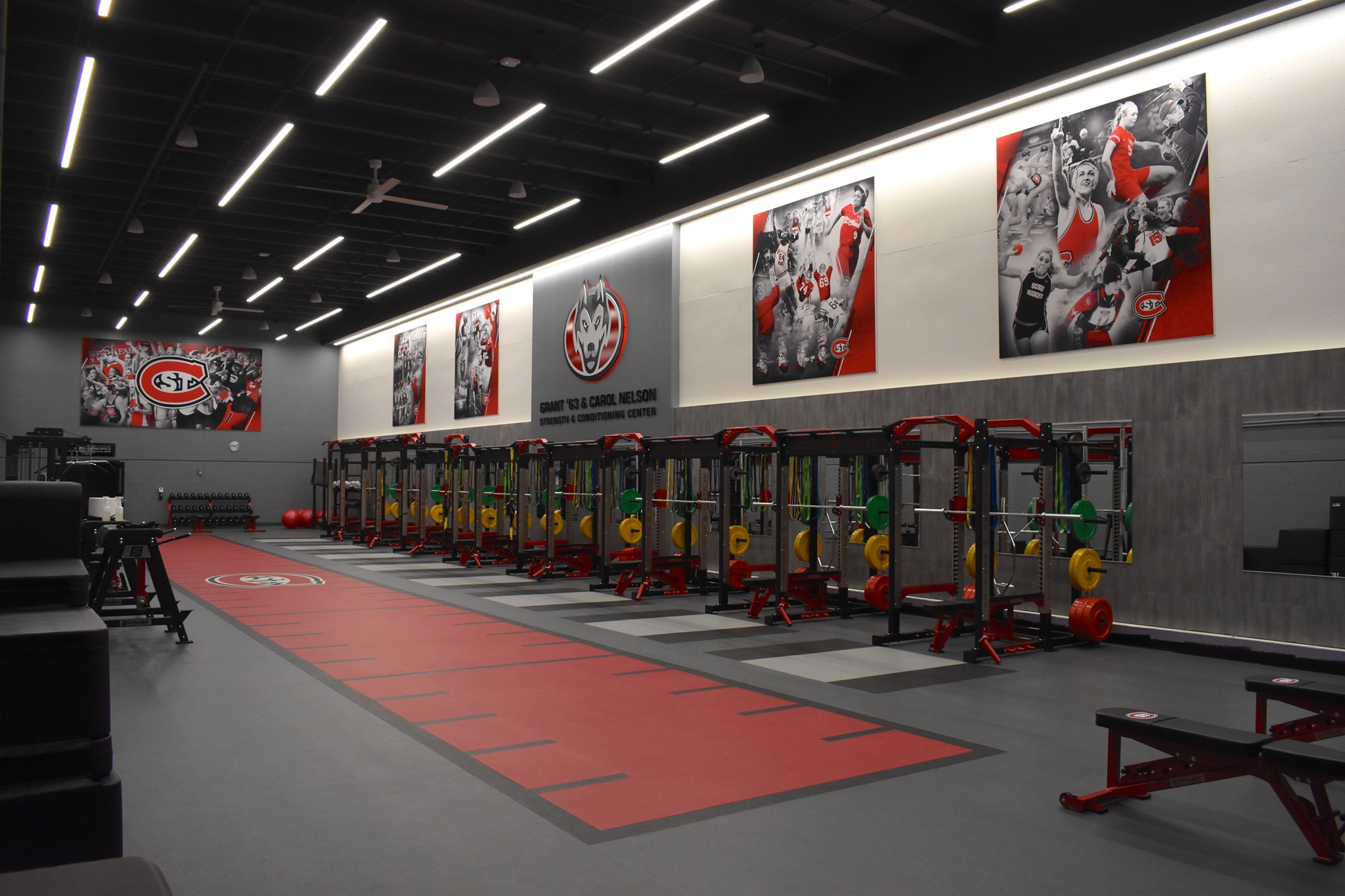
The Strength and Conditioning Center at Halenbeck Hall

Concerts and speakers frequented Halenbeck Hall from the mid-1960s to the 2000s. Some of the bands who performed at Halenbeck include The New Christy Minstrels, Bachman–Turner Overdrive, Hall & Oates, Cheap Trick, The Wallflowers (1997 and 2000), Bush, Everclear, and Evanescence. Noteworthy concerts from individual singers and musicians include: John Denver, Doc Severinsen (sellout), Elton John, Peter Nero, Martin Zellar, and Ne-Yo. Halenbeck has also hosted speakers, entertainers, and activists such as Ralph Nader, George Carlin, Bob Hope, Phil Donahue, Jesse Jackson, Spike Lee, and Magic Johnson.

The 2010s saw a large dip in concerts and non-athletic events at Halenbeck. According to SCSU's then-athletic director Heather Weems, this was due in part to the lack of student interest and the weak economy forcing students to redirect their spending towards other expenses (including various student fees) considering university concert fees of previous decades were paid off from student fees and student ticket sales. House Representative Tom Emmer inquired about using the arena during the summer of 2024 for a Donald Trump rally and speech, but that request was shot down by Holly Schreiner, St. Cloud State Director of Athletics, as Halenbeck does not have air conditioning. The rally was instead held at SCSU's Herb Brooks National Hockey Center on July 27.

On September 18, 1974, David Duke, then-national director of the Ku Klux Klan, spoke at Halenbeck Hall in front of 1,800 SCSU students. The 1.5-hour long speech drew both criticism and praise, with an estimated one-hundred protesters outside the arena. Duke discussed perceived issues regarding Black Americans, Jewish people, communism, news media, US-Middle East foreign policy, crime rates, affirmative action, and white supremacy. $1,050 in monies were paid to Duke via the university's Student Activities Committee (SAC). The SAC bylaws prohibited the funding of political activities, which was an oversight pointed out by a university senior who sought a charge of misappropriation of those funds. Duke returned to Halenbeck in 1997.

== Attendance records ==
The highest recorded attendance for a basketball game at Halenbeck Hall occurred on March 3, 1977, in the Minnesota Region 8AA boys' semifinal game between Little Falls Community High School and Apollo High School with 7,252 spectators.

=== Men's basketball ===
Men's Basketball Top Ten Home Attendance Records
Date	Opponent	Result	Attendance	Source
February 22, 1986	Mankato State	Win: 77–71	6,849	
February 15, 1986	South Dakota State	Win: 105–75	6,407	
February 1, 1986	North Dakota State	Win: 59–51	6,325	
January 31, 1986	North Dakota	Win: 62–56	6,117	
March 9, 1986	Wayne State (MI)	Loss: 75–71	5,700	
March 7, 1986	Eastern Montana	Win: 76–67	5,250	
February 5, 2005	Minnesota State-Mankato	Win: 89–76	5,222	
February 14, 1986	Augustana (SD)	Loss: 70–69	5,118	
January 28, 1986	Morningside	Win: 89–77	5,049	
December 6, 1969	St. John's (MN)	Win: 80–53	>5,000	

=== Women's basketball ===
Women's Basketball Top Ten Home Attendance Records
Date	Opponent	Result	Attendance	Source
January 21, 2006	North Dakota	Loss: 66–58	4,871	
February 28, 2009	Winona State	Loss: 84–75	4,102	
February 7, 2009	Bemidji State	Win: 89–61	3,386	
January 17, 2009	Minnesota State-Mankato	Loss: 67–60	3,298	
February 6, 2009	Minnesota Duluth	Loss: 68–65	3,278	
January 24, 2009	Northern State	Win: 73–54	3,187	
January 16, 2009	Southwest Minnesota State	Win: 76–55	3,122	
February 15, 2003	North Dakota	Loss: 68–61	3,100	
January 3, 2009	Concordia-St. Paul	Win: 67–58	3,011	
January 28, 2006	Minnesota Duluth	Win: 72–54	2,972	

== See also ==
- List of NCAA Division II basketball arenas
