= Colorado Christian Event Center =

Arena in Lakewood, Colorado, US

Colorado Christian University Event Center
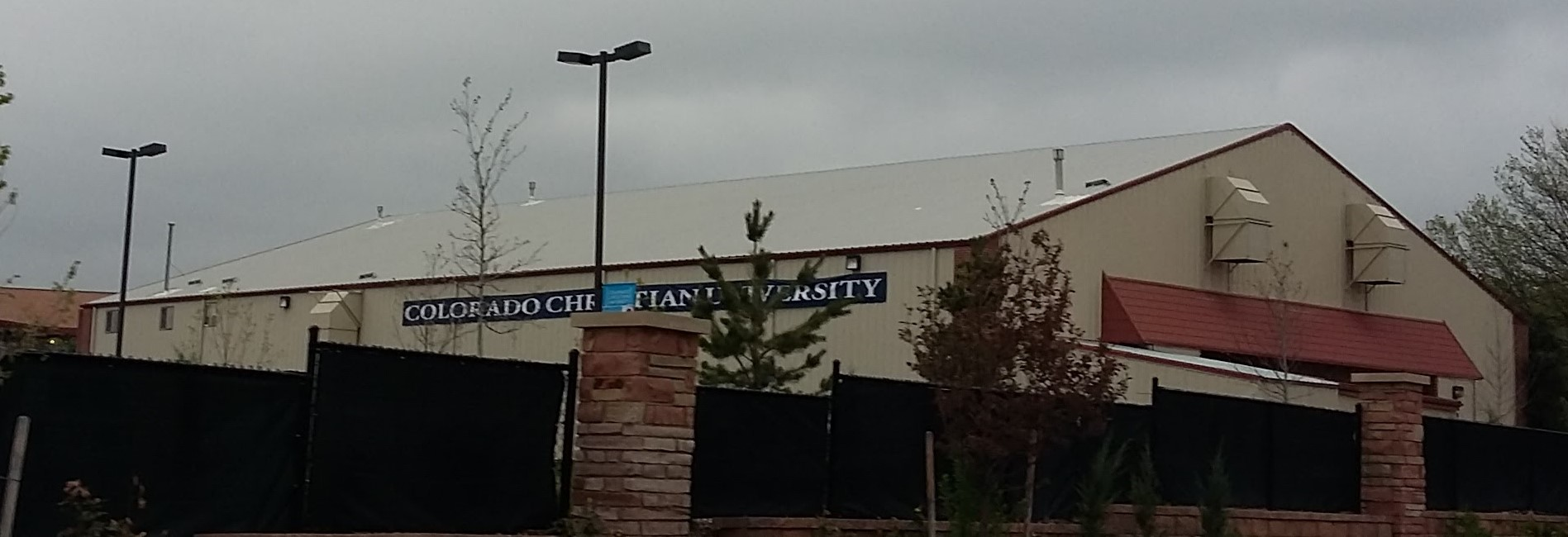
- Interactive map of Colorado Christian University Event Center
- Former names: Cougar Field House; Cougar Event Center
- Address: 8787 W. Alameda Ave; Lakewood, Colorado; United States
- Coordinates: 39°42.870′N 105°3.735′W
- Capacity: 1500
- Type: gymnasium
- Scoreboard: Yes

Website
- www.ccu.edu/about/eventcenter/

The Colorado Christian University Event Center is the home arena of the Colorado Christian Cougars, who play basketball in the Rocky Mountain Athletic Conference.

In addition to university activities, the Event Center has served as the home arena for the American Basketball Association Colorado Storm in 2004 and the International Basketball League Colorado Crossover in 2006–2007.
