= James Center Arena =

Multi-purpose arena in Tuskegee, Alabama

Coordinates: 32°25′48.09″N 85°42′17.04″W

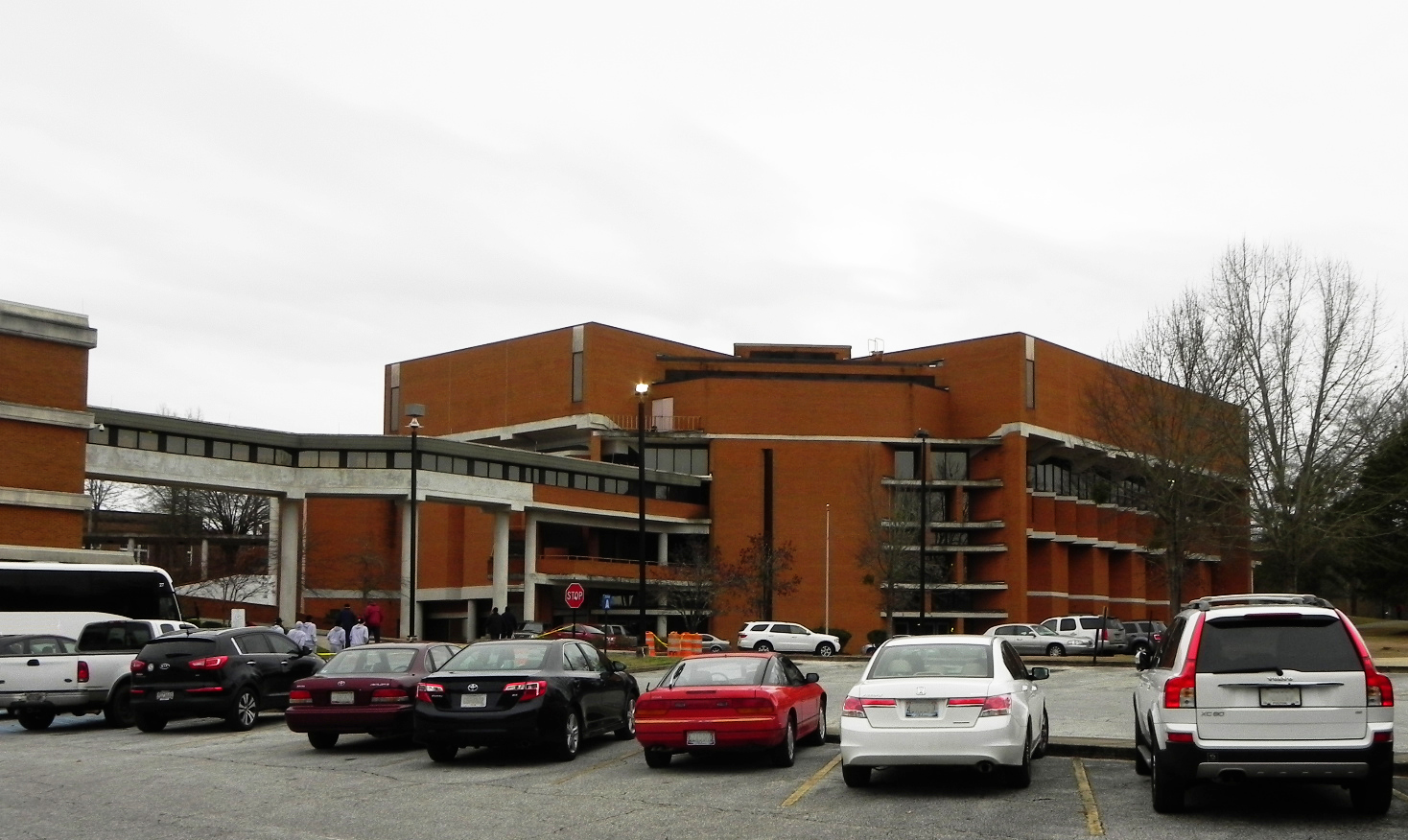
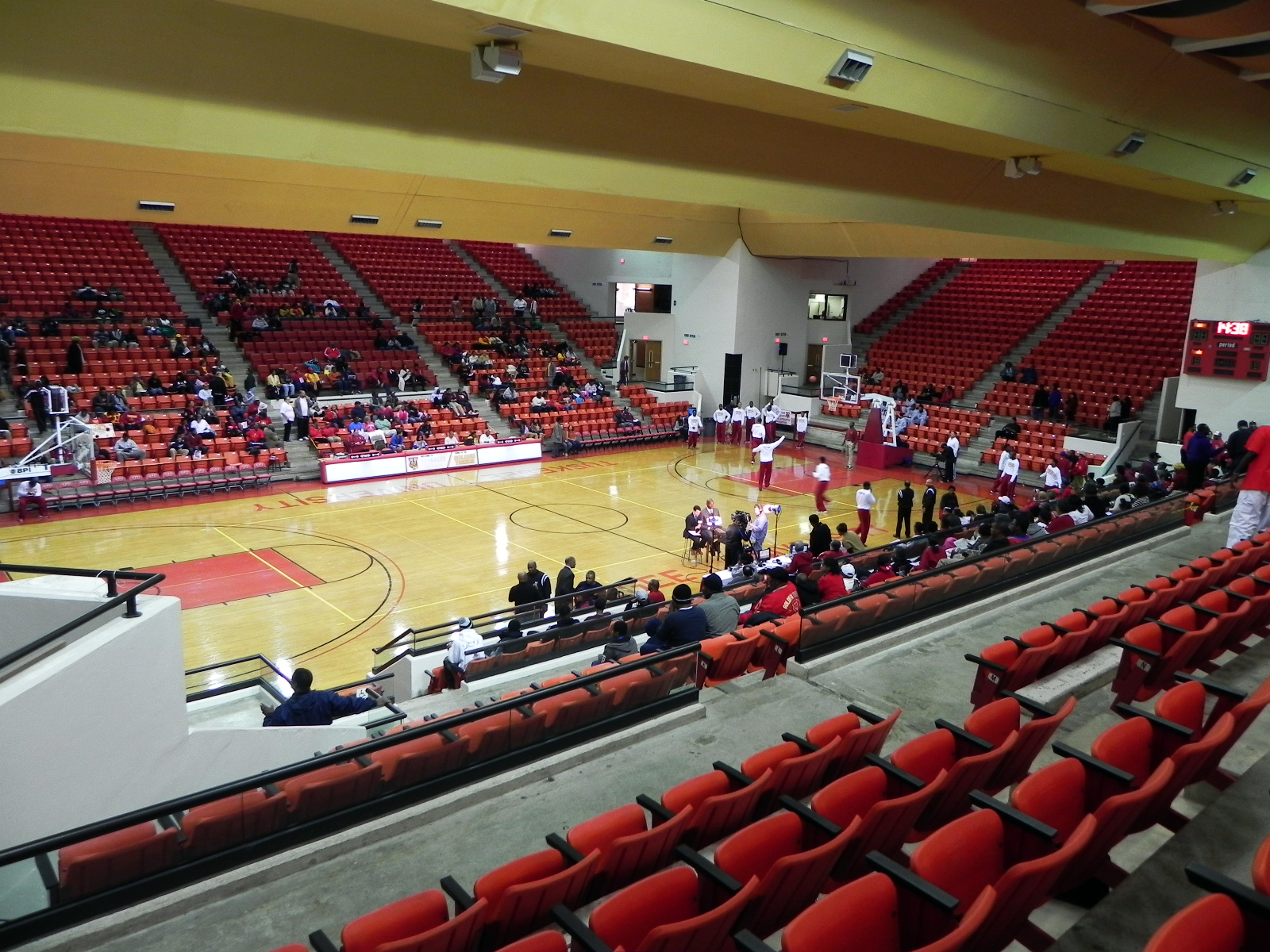

- Location within the United States Location within Alabama
- Interactive map of James Center Arena
- Location: 1200 West Old Montgomery Road; Tuskegee, AL 36088
- Owner: Tuskegee University
- Operator: Tuskegee University
- Capacity: 5,000

Construction
- Opened: May 10, 1987
- Cost: $18.6 million

Tenant
- Tuskegee Golden Tigers (NCAA) (1987–present)

Daniel "Chappie" James Center Arena is a 5,000 seat multi-purpose arena in Tuskegee, Alabama. It was built in 1987. The first game was played at the arena was on November 20, 1987. It is the home of the Tuskegee University Golden Tigers basketball teams.
