= Colorado Christian Cougars =

Athletic teams representing Colorado Christian University

- University: Colorado Christian University
- Conference: RMAC
- NCAA: Division II
- Athletic director: Jon Poag
- Location: Lakewood, Colorado
- Varsity teams: 13 (6 men's, 7 women's)
- Basketball arena: CCU Event Center
- Baseball stadium: All Star Park
- Soccer stadium: Trailblazer Stadium
- Nickname: Cougars
- Colors: Navy blue and gold
- Website: ccucougars.com
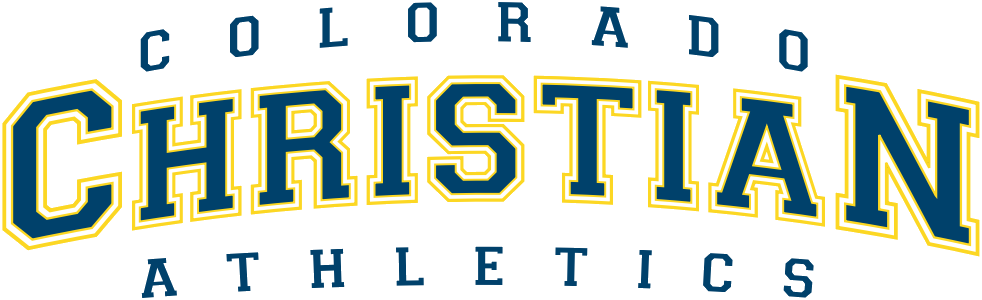

The Colorado Christian Cougars are the athletic teams that represent Colorado Christian University, located in Lakewood, Colorado, in NCAA Division II intercollegiate sports. The Cougars compete as members of the Rocky Mountain Athletic Conference for all 13 varsity sports.

== Varsity Sports ==
=== Teams ===
Men's sports

- Baseball
- Basketball
- Cross Country
- Golf
- Soccer
- Track & Field

Women's sports

- Basketball
- Cross Country
- Golf
- Soccer
- Softball
- Track & Field
- Volleyball
