= Wilson Complex =

Multipurpose arena in Las Vegas, New Mexico

Coordinates: 35.601577°N 105.224293°W

The Wilson Complex is a 4,250-seat multipurpose arena in Las Vegas, New Mexico, United States. It was built in 1986. It is the home of the New Mexico Highlands University Cowboys basketball and volleyball teams. The facility also houses offices for the school's athletic coaches.
