= Plachy Hall =

- Interactive map of Plachy Hall
- Location: Alamosa, Colorado
- Coordinates: 37.476173°N 105.880991°W
- Owner: Adams State University
- Operator: Adams State University
- Seating type: Bleachers
- Capacity: 500
- Event: Basketball arena

Tenant
- Adams State Grizzlies basketball

Plachy Hall is a basketball arena located in Alamosa, Colorado which serves as the home arena for the Adams State Grizzlies basketball team. The arena seats around 500.
