= Tuskegee Golden Tigers =

Intercollegiate athletics program that represents Tuskegee University

- University: Tuskegee University
- Conference: SIAC (primary)
- NCAA: Division II
- Athletic director: Reginald Ruffin
- Location: Tuskegee, Alabama
- Varsity teams: 12 (6 men's, 6 women's)
- Football stadium: Cleve L. Abbott Memorial Alumni Stadium
- Basketball arena: Daniel "Chappie" James Center
- Baseball stadium: Washington Field
- Softball stadium: Tuskegee Softball Field
- Tennis venue: Pepsico Tennis Courts
- Nickname: Golden Tigers
- Colors: Crimson and gold
- Website: goldentigersports.com
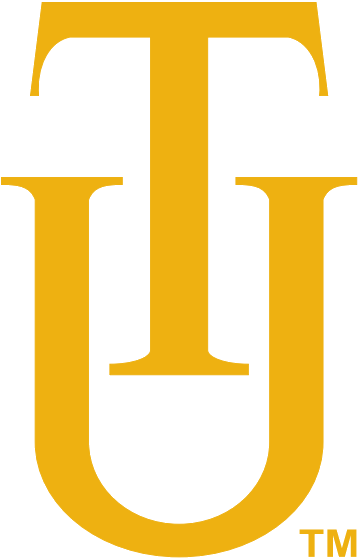

The Tuskegee Golden Tigers represent Tuskegee University in intercollegiate athletics. They are a member of the National Collegiate Athletic Association (NCAA) Division II and compete within the Southern Intercollegiate Athletic Conference (SIAC). The university has a total of 10 varsity sports teams, five men's teams called the "Golden Tigers", and five women's teams called the "Tigerettes".

== Teams ==
The Tuskegee Department of Athletics sponsors the following sports:

Men's sports	Women's sports
Baseball	Basketball
Basketball	Cross country
Cross country	Softball
Football	Tennis
Tennis	Track and field
Track and field	Volleyball

=== Baseball ===
The baseball program has won thirteen SIAC championships and has produced several professional players, including big-leaguers Leon Wagner, Ken Howell, Alan Mills and Roy Lee Jackson.

=== Basketball ===
==== Men's basketball ====
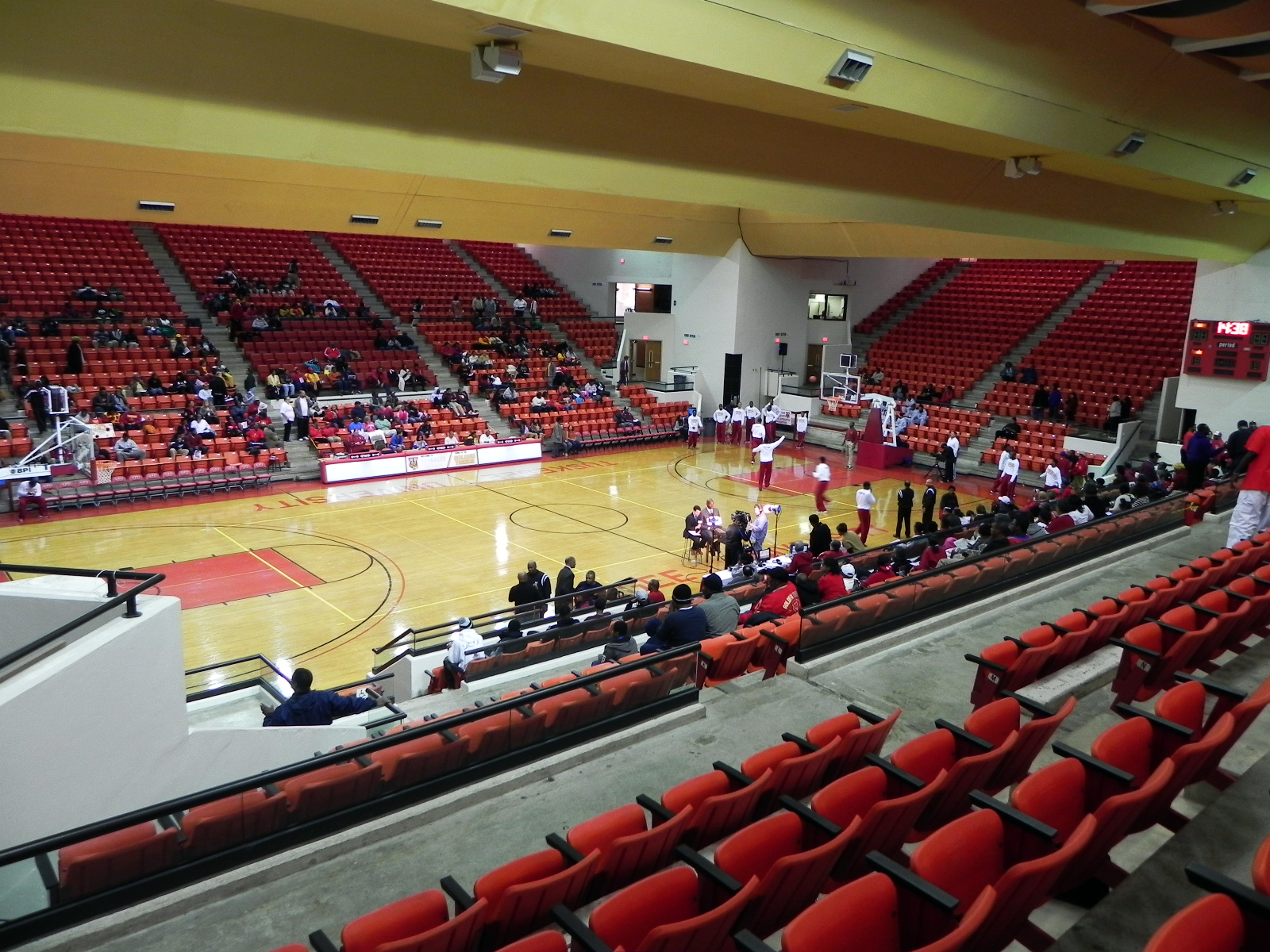
James Center Arena is the men's and women's basketball teams venue

Tuskegee won the 2013–14 SIAC Championship and advanced to the 2014 NCAA Division II men's basketball tournament. Tuskegee won the NCAA Division II South Regional Championship by defeating Delta State University 80-59.

The Golden Tigers fell to No. 1-ranked Metro State (Metropolitan State University of Denver), 106-87, in the Elite Eight of the NCAA Division II tournament at Ford Center, in Evansville, Indiana.

As of August 8, 2014, Jerry Dunn is the head coach of the Tuskegee Golden Tigers Men's Basketball.

==== Women's basketball ====
Quacy Barnes-Timmons became head coach on May 4, 2015.

=== Football ===
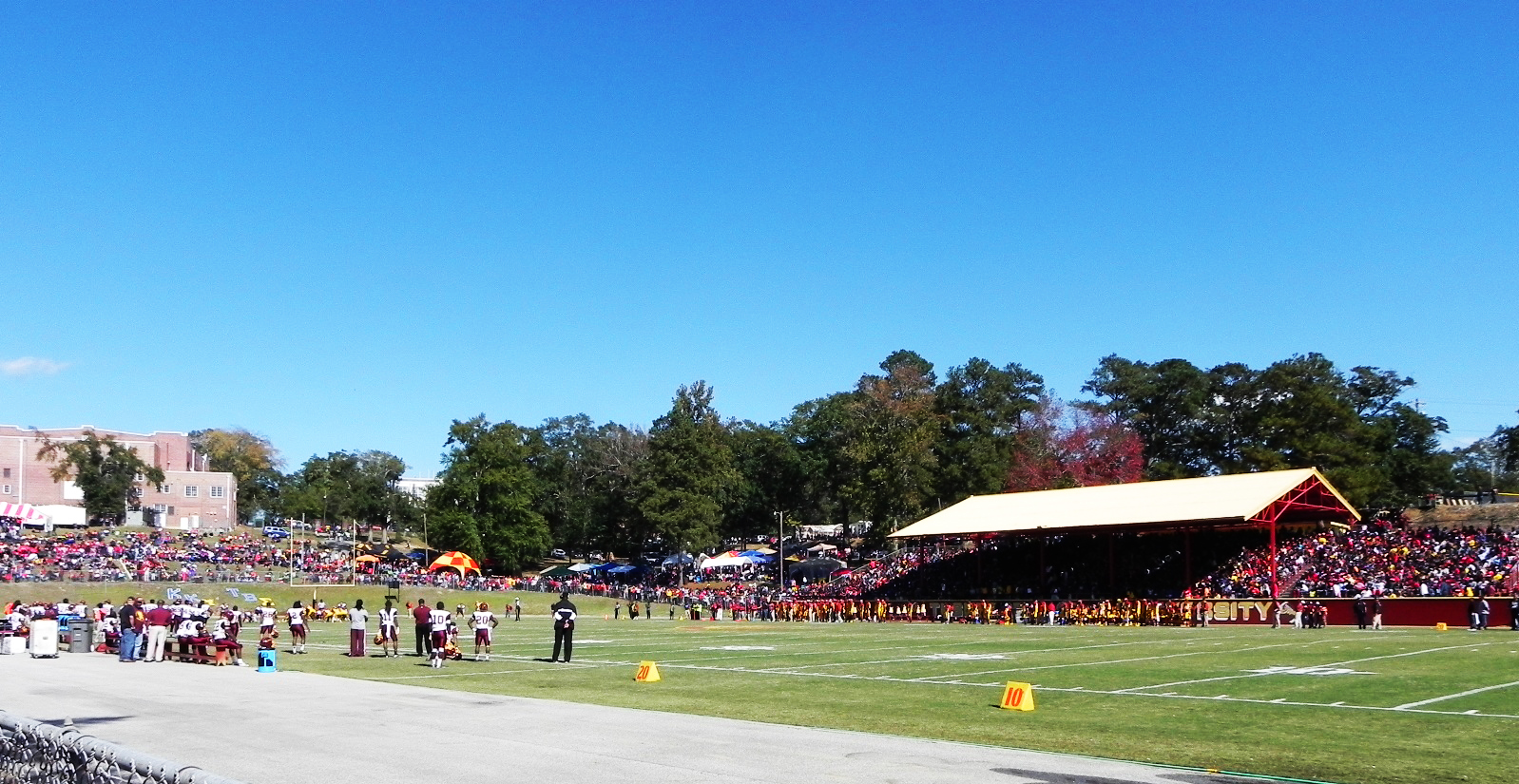
Cleveland Leigh Abbott Memorial Alumni Stadium, completed 1924. The stadium was the first of its kind to be built at any HBCU in the south

The Tuskegee University football team has won 29 SIAC championships (the most in SIAC history). As of 2013 the Golden Tigers continue to be the most successful HBCU with 652 wins.

In 2013 Tuskegee opted not to renew its contract to face rival Alabama State University (Division I FCS) in the Turkey Day Classic, the oldest black college football classic in the country. Instead, after going 10–2 the Golden Tigers made their first playoff appearance in school history for the 2013 NCAA Division II Football Championship, for which they had qualified in the past but could not participate due to the Turkey Day Classic. Tuskegee competed against the University of North Alabama in the first round of the playoffs, but lost 30–27. Tuskegee won the 2014 SIAC Football Championship and advanced to the first round of the NCAA Division II football playoffs with a loss of 20–17 to the University of West Georgia.

Tuskegee lead the nation in 2013 Division II football average attendance for their three home games.

=== Softball ===
Tuskegee defeated Albany State University, 11–7, to claim the 2014 SIAC Softball Championship.

=== Track and field ===
Track began (Men and Women) at Tuskegee in 1916. The first Tuskegee Relays and Meet was held on May 7, 1927; it was the oldest African American relay meet.

The Tuskegee women's team won the championship of the Amateur Athletic Union national senior outdoor meet for all athletes 14 times in 1937–1942 and 1944–1951. The team likewise won the AAU national indoor championship four times in 1941, 1945, 1946 and 1948.

Tuskegee's Alice Coachman was the first African American woman to win an Olympic gold medal in any sport, at the 1948 Olympic Games in London. Iram Lewis, a Tuskegee graduate of architecture, is an Olympian relay runner who competed for the Bahamas.
