= Emporia State Hornets =

Athletic teams that represent Emporia State University

- University: Emporia State University
- Conference: The MIAA
- NCAA: Division II
- Athletic director: Steve Rodecap
- Location: Emporia, Kansas
- Varsity teams: 15 (7 men's, 8 women's, 1 co-ed)
- Football stadium: Francis G. Welch Stadium
- Basketball arena: William L. White Auditorium
- Baseball stadium: Trusler Sports Complex
- Softball stadium: Trusler Sports Complex
- Mascot: Corky the Hornet
- Nickname: Hornets
- Fight song: "Fight On Emporia!"
- Colors: Black and gold
- Website: esuhornets.com

The Emporia State Hornets are the athletic teams that represent Emporia State University (ESU). The women's basketball and softball teams use the name Lady Hornets. The university's athletic program fields 15 varsity teams in 11 sports all of whom have combined to win 50 conference championships as well as three national championships (1 NAIA, 1 AIAW and 1 NCAA). Corky the Hornet serves as the mascot representing the teams, and the school colors are black and gold. Emporia State participates in the NCAA Division II and has been a member of the Mid-America Intercollegiate Athletics Association (MIAA) since 1991.

The university's athletic director is Steve Rodecap, who began his tenure on August 5, 2025. The Hornet football team has been coached by Garin Higgins since 2007. MJ Baker was named head coach of the Lady Hornets basketball program in 2025. The women's basketball program is the school's only NCAA championship, which the team won during the 2010 tournament. The men's basketball team is coached by Tom Billeter.

== History and overview ==
In 1923, the teams were known as the "Yaps", but it was not a popular name. Men's basketball coach Vic Trusler suggested the name "Yellow Jackets". This was later changed to "Hornets".

=== Overview ===
Since 2008, Emporia State has had four top four finishes in the nation. The Lady Hornets basketball team won the 2010 NCAA Division II National Championship game against Fort Collins, Colorado. In 2009, the baseball team were national runners up, as were the Lady Hornet softball team. In 2011, the men's track & field team won took 4th place in the NCAA Div. II National Track Championships.

The 2003–04 athletic season was a record season for ESU. ESU became the first school to have their football, men's basketball, women's basketball, baseball and softball teams all advance to NCAA play in the same school year. ESU has averaged over 100,000 fans a year at home events over the last eight years.

Since 2002, Emporia State has placed in the top 50 out of over 300 Division II schools nationally in the Learfield Sports Director's Cup for 12 straight years with a high of 4th in 2013–14.

=== Timeline ===
Emporia State Athletic Directors
Tenure	Athletic Director
1920–1928	Homer Woodson Hargiss
1928–1962	Fran Welch
1962–1970	Joe Pease
1970–1971	Norris Patterson
1971–1979	Bill Tidwell
1979–1999	Bill Quayle
1999–2022	Kent Weiser
2022–2025	David Spafford
2025–present	Steve Rodecap

=== Conference history ===
MIAA logo in ESU's colors

Emporia State has been a member of six conferences and two stints as an independent, since its athletics beginnings in 1893.

Emporia State University began its athletic life as a member of the Kansas Intercollegiate Athletic Conference (KIAC) from 1893 to 1928. Emporia State, along with other schools from the conference, withdrew from the KIAC and formed the Central Intercollegiate Athletic Conference (CIAC) in 1928, where it stayed as a member for thirty-nine years. After competing the CIAC for almost four decades, Emporia State left the CIAC and joined the Rocky Mountain Athletic Conference (RMAC) in 1967. In 1972, the RMAC split into two conferences, one keeping the current name and the other to be called Great Plains Athletic Conference (GPAC), and four years later formed the Central States Intercollegiate Conference (CSIC). In 1989, the CSIC disbanded and Emporia State became an Independent. In 1991, Emporia State became an NCAA Division II member and joined the Mid-America Intercollegiate Athletics Association (MIAA), where it remains a member today.

== Varsity teams ==
Emporia State competes in 16 intercollegiate varsity sports, the newest being disc golf for both men and women.

Men's sports	Women's sports
Baseball	Basketball
Basketball	Cross country
Cross country	Disc golf
Disc golf	Soccer
Football	Softball
Tennis	Tennis
Track and field^{†}	Track and field^{†}
	Volleyball
† – Track and field includes both indoor and outdoor

=== Baseball ===
The Hornets baseball team played its first game in 1978. The team has five conference championships, and two NCAA Division II World Series appearance with a 2009 runner-up. The team had also made five appearances in the NAIA World Series, winning the 1978 World Series. From 2004 to 2018, the team was coached by former player, Bob Fornelli, who finished 599–266 (.692) at Emporia State.

=== Men's basketball ===
The Hornets basketball team was founded in 1901, thirty-eight years after the university was founded. For the last 115 years, the program has compiled a record of 1,380–1,126 (.551). Some notable coaches are Fred Honhart, George Crispin, Homer Woodson Hargiss, and A.A. Schabinger.

=== Women's basketball ===
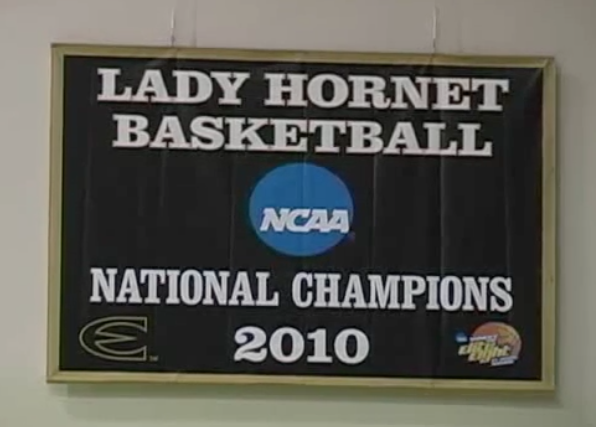
2010 National Championship banner hanging in White Auditorium

Of its varsity sports, Emporia States's women's basketball team has been the only one to claim a national title. The Lady Hornets, who was led by head coach Brandon Schneider, won the 2010 NCAA Division II Women's Basketball Championship, defeating the Fort Lewis College (Colorado) Skyhawks.

In 1998, Emporia State's women's basketball team played in the NCAA Women's Division II Basketball Championship. The head coach for that team was Cindy Stein, who left to coach at the University of Missouri.

=== Cross country and track & field ===
The men's and women's cross country teams are currently coached by Justin Hill. With the men's program starting in 1923 and the women's program in 1976, the women's team has won one MIAA conference championship, which was in 1994. The cross country teams run their home meets at Jones Park, in Northeast Emporia.

The men's and women's track and field teams are currently coached by Steven Blocker. Since joining the MIAA in 1991, the women's team has won five MIAA outdoor championships and two indoor championships while the men's team has won two MIAA conference outdoor championships. The track teams host meets on the Zola Witten Track at Francis G. Welch Stadium.

=== Football ===
Emporia State's "Hornets" logo used until 2014

The Hornets football team, is currently coached by former Hornet quarterback Garin Higgins, who played from 1987–1990. Since joining the MIAA in 1991, the Hornets have gone 119–118 in conference play. The Hornets have also participated in five post-season bowls in which three of those were wins. Past football coaches include Homer Woodson Hargiss, Jerry Kill, and Harold Elliott.

=== Soccer ===
Starting in 2001, the women's soccer program is the second-youngest intercollegiate sport at Emporia State. The team is coached by Jane Grimley-Gunn. The soccer games are either played on the ESU soccer pitch or at Emporia High School.

=== Softball ===
The Lady Hornets softball team played its first game by 1971, seven years before the baseball team. The team is currently coached by April Huddleston, who took over the program on October 19, 2015. The softball team appeared in three Women's College World Series in 1971, 1972 and 1979 and also won the first AIAW Division II national championship in 1980. Emporia State also played for the national championship in 2006 and 2008.

=== Tennis ===
The men's and women's tennis teams competed on the George Milton Tennis Courts, named after the longtime tennis coach for Emporia State, having served from 1966 to 1999, George Milton until 2021. In October 2021, the Greg Kossover Family Complex opened on campus. With the men's program starting in 1966 and the women's program 10 years later, the tennis teams have been successful. Since joining the MIAA, the women's team has won two conference championships in 2005 and 2007, and have participated in the NCAA tournament four years, advancing to the Sweet 16 in 2007. The men's team has advanced to the NCAA tournament in 2007 and 2008.

=== Volleyball ===
Since 1973, the Hornets volleyball team has combined a total record of 973–601. Since joining the MIAA in 1991, the Hornets have won one conference championship in 2008, and have advanced to the NCAA Tournament in 2005, 2007, 2008, 2009 and 2010. The Hornets are coached by Ken Murczeku, who was hired in January 2023.

== Facilities ==
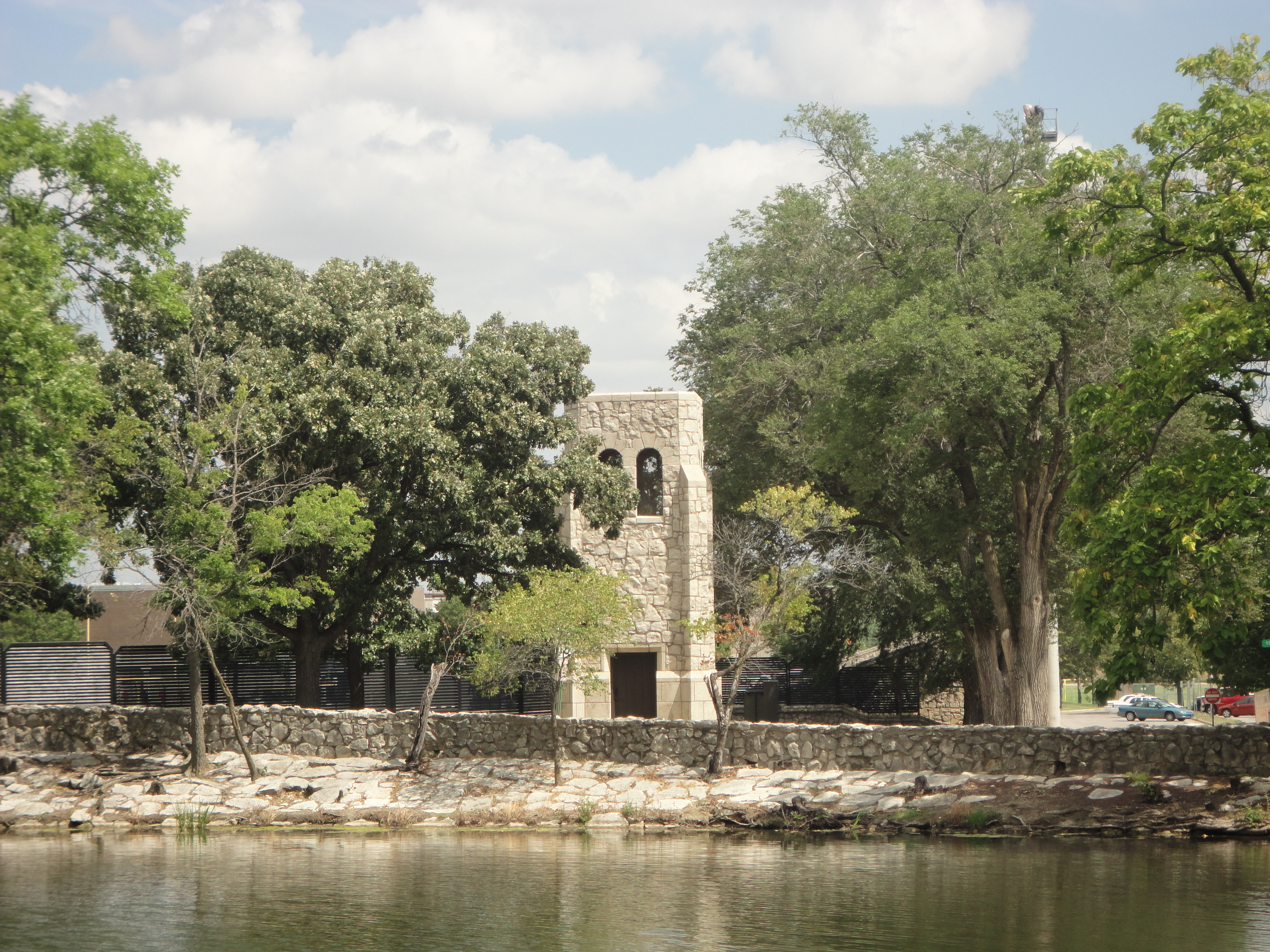
The Silent Joe Bell Tower

Francis G. Welch Stadium serves as home to the Hornets football team. The stadium, who is named for long-time Emporia State coach and athletic director Fran Welch, opened in 1947 and since then has gone under a few renovations. Improvements done in 1994 include installation of a new scoreboard and fence as well as remodelling of entrance areas, concessions, and washrooms. In 1997, the Hutchinson Family Pavilion was added. It hosts multiple levels of enclosed sky-boxes, theatre-style seating, and a media area. The current seating capacity of the stadium is 10,000. Zola Witten Track is also in the facility, used by the track teams.

Since 1940, home basketball games have been played at William L. White Auditorium, a 5,000-seat arena which is named after William Lindsay White, son of William Allen White. In addition to serving as home to the men's and women's basketball teams, the auditorium has been used by the Hornets volleyball team since the program started in 1973. In 2008, a new scoreboard and video screen were installed, and the arena floor was refinished and a refreshed logo added. Interior painting in a new color scheme was completed throughout the building.

Trusler Sports Complex is home to the baseball and softball teams. The baseball team competes on Glennen Field, named after Dr. Robert E. Glennen, thirteenth president of Emporia State University. In 2009, artificial turf was installed in the formerly dirt infield. The Lady Hornets compete on Turnbull Field, which is named in honor of J. Michael Turnbull, president and trustee of the Trusler Foundation.

The Hornet tennis teams compete in the Kossover Family Tennis Complex, which opens in 2021 and replaced the outdoor Milton Tennis Courts. George Milton was the longtime tennis coach for Emporia State, having served from 1966 to 1999.

Facility name	Teams	Capacity	Opened
Trusler Sports Complex	Baseball, softball	500/450	1992
William L. White Auditorium	Basketball, volleyball	5,000	1941
Francis G. Welch Stadium	Football, track	7,000	1937
Hornet Pitch	Soccer	500	2009
Kossover Family Tennis Complex	Tennis	100	1966

== Traditions ==
=== School colors ===
Black	Gold

Emporia State's official school colors are black and gold. They have been the colors since the school was founded in 1863, and until recently, the gold was Old gold.

=== Mascot ===
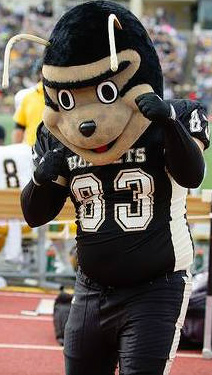
Corky the Hornet at an Emporia State football game

In 1933, the Teachers College had a student contest where students and staff could design a mascot for the college. Sophomore Paul Edwards, who graduated in 1937, designed Corky. Although hundreds of drawings were submitted, Edwards' Corky, a "human-like" hornet was selected. Corky was published in The Bulletin, the student newspaper for Emporia State University.

=== Songs ===
Fight On, Emporia! is the official fight song for Emporia State University. The lyrics for the fight song were written by Alfred Thompson (BME '34), student at Kansas State Teachers College. Tom Isern wrote the lyrics for ESU's alma mater and the music was composed by Joseph Ott.

== Notable alumni ==
- Al Feuerbach – Competed in the shot put at the 1972 and 1976 Olympics and finished in fifth and fourth place, respectively. On May 5, 1973, he broke Randy Matson's seven-year-old world record in the shot put by throwing 21.82 meters (71' 7") at the San Jose Invitational at San Jose State College. He was a four time American champion in the shot put, plus he added three indoor championships and a AAA Championship. In 2016, he was elected into the National Track and Field Hall of Fame.
- Frank Anderson – former head baseball coach for the Oklahoma State Cowboys, now an assistant for the University of Houston.
- Dale Burnett – former NFL football player that played for the New York Giants and was on 1932 World Championship team.
- Jory Collins – head women's basketball coach from 2010 to 2018 at Emporia State; and head coach for the North Dakota State Bison women's basketball team from 2019–present
- Al Feuerbach – former Olympian and world record holder in the shot put.
- Don Dennis – pitched for St. Louis Cardinals in 1965 and 1966.
- Bob Fornelli – Emporia State baseball coach (2004–2018)
- Kelly Goodburn – NFL football player for Kansas City Chiefs and Washington Redskins. Played in XXIV Super Bowl when Washington won World Championship.

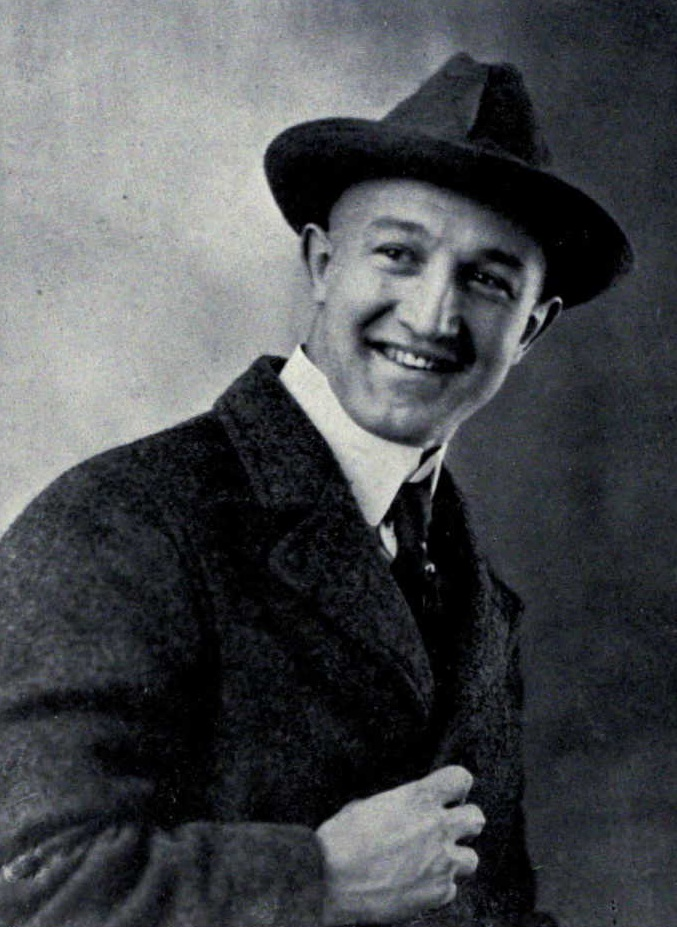
Homer Woodson Hargiss

- Homer Woodson Hargiss – head football coach for 12 years and compiled a 62–23–11 record. His 1926 squad produced a 7–0 record, the only perfect season in ESU history.
- Steve Henry – drafted by the NFL St. Louis Cardinals in 1979 and played one year for the Cardinals, one year for the New York Giants, and one year for the Baltimore Colts.
- Garin Higgins – former quarterback at Emporia State; current head football coach at Emporia State.
- Brad Hill – former head baseball coach at Kansas State University.
- Gene Johnson – head basketball coach at Wichita State University and Kansas Wesleyan University, won two AAU national titles and was assistant coach for the 1936 gold medal Olympic basketball team. Credited with inventing the full-court zone press.
- Fred Kipp – played baseball for the New York Yankees, Brooklyn Dodgers, and Los Angeles Dodgers.
- John Kuck – gold medal winner in the shot put at the 1928 Summer Olympics in Amsterdam.
- Bob Leahy – played in the NFL for the Pittsburgh Steelers.
- Leon Lett – helped Hornets to the NAIA National Championship game in 1989. Played for Dallas Cowboys in 3 Super Bowls.
- Archie San Romani – won the national collegiate mile in 1935 and the 1,500-meter run in 1936. Anchored distance medley relay that set world record in 1936 and was fourth in the 1,500-meter run at the 1936 Olympics in Berlin. San Romani also set a world record in the 2,000-meter run in 1937 that stood for 25 years.
- Brian Shay – running back for ESU, who won the 1998 Harlon Hill Trophy and broke 17 NCAA Division II records. Later played for the Berlin Thunder, Orlando Rage and was a member of the 1999 Kansas City Chiefs practice squad.
- Steve Shifflett – major league baseball player for Kansas City Royals.
- Bill Tidwell – NAIA four-time champion middle distance runner in the 1950s, Emporia State Athletic Director (1971–1979), track and cross country coach (1979–1984).
- Fran Welch – Quarterbacked ESU football team to a 24-1-2 record in his career. In 24 years as a football coach, compiled a 116-81-15 mark. His track and cross country teams claimed 18 league crowns, four NAIA cross country championships, one NAIA track title, and one NCAA small college cross country title.
