= Emporia State Hornets baseball =

- Founded: 1949
- Overall record: 2075–1209–3 (.632)
- University: Emporia State University
- Athletic director: Steve Rodecap
- Head coach: John Martin (1st season)
- Conference: The MIAA
- Location: Emporia, Kansas
- Home stadium: Glennen Field at Trusler Sports Complex (Capacity: 500)
- Nickname: Hornets
- Colors: Black and gold

College World Series champions
- National Association of Intercollegiate Athletics; 1978

College World Series runner-up
- National Association of Intercollegiate Athletics; 1987 National Collegiate Athletic Association; 2009

College World Series appearances
- National Association of Intercollegiate Athletics; 1969, 1970, 1976, 1978, 1984, 1986, 1987 National Collegiate Athletic Association; 2006, 2009

NCAA tournament appearances
- National Association of Intercollegiate Athletics; 1978, 1979, 1980, 1981, 1982, 1983, 1984, 1985, 1986, 1987, 1988, 1989 National Collegiate Athletic Association; 1993, 2004, 2005, 2006, 2007, 2008, 2009, 2010, 2011, 2014, 2015, 2016, 2017

Conference tournament champions
- Mid-America Intercollegiate Athletics Association; 1993, 2007, 2014

Conference regular season champions
- Mid-America Intercollegiate Athletics Association; 2006, 2008, 2009, 2011, 2017

The Emporia State Hornets baseball team represented Emporia State University in NCAA Division II college baseball. The team participated in the Mid-America Intercollegiate Athletics Association. The teams played its home games on Glennen Field at Trusler Sports Complex, located just north of the Emporia State campus, and are coached by John Martin.

== History ==
Emporia State Coaching History
Tenure	Coach	Won	Lost	Tie	Pct.
1949–1950	Bob Ives	19	9	0	.679
1951	John Buckley	11	5	0	.545
1952	Joe Pease	8	5	0	.615
No team from 1953 to 1955
1956	Chuck Sisson	4	4	0	.500
1957	Noel McGregor	4	5	0	.444
1958–1962	Bill Kerr	58	55	0	.513
1963	Richard Niclai	13	10	0	.579
1964–1965	Larry Ensminger	37	27	0	.556
1966	Guy Owen	15	12	0	.556
1967–1969	Larry Cochell	72	44	0	.621
1970–1973	Jack Smitheran	123	61	0	.668
1974–1987	Dave Bingham	557	270	2	.685
1988–2003	Brian Embery	458	320	1	.589
2004–2018	Bob Fornelli	599	266	0	.692
2019–present	Seth Wheeler	97	116	0	.455
2024–2025	Brad Hill	44	54	0	.449
2026–present	John Martin	0	0	0	–
Total: 74 years	16 Coaches	2,119–1,263–3			.626

The second most successful era for ESU baseball was from 1974 to 1987, when the program was coached by former player Dave Bingham, who posted an overall record of 557–270–2 (.685), and won eight conference championships. From 1988 through the 2015 season, ESU's winning percentage increased to .640 (943–530–1), and both Brian Embery and Bob Fornelli have a winning record with each having more than 450 wins. During the 2009 season, the Hornets were the national runners-up, competing in the NCAA Division II College World Series for the second time since joining the NCAA in 1991.

=== Early history (1949–1957) ===
The Kansas State Teachers College (KSTC), now Emporia State University, fielded its first baseball team in 1949, which was led by Bob Ives. Ives served two seasons as head coach, compiling a record of 19–9. For the next two seasons, KSTC had two coaches with a record of 19–10, and from 1953 to 1955, KSTC discontinued the program.

In 1956, KSTC had restarted the program with Chuck Sisson serving one season as head coach. After Sisson's season of going 4–4, Joe Pease, KSTC professor and later the athletic director for KSTC, became head coach for one season.

Statistics overview
Early years (1949–1957) — Year-by-year record
Season	Team	Overall	Conference	Standing	Postseason
Bob Ives (Central Intercollegiate Athletic Conference) (1949–1950)
1949	Bob Ives	7–5			
1950	Bob Ives	12–4			
John Bulkley (CIAC) (1951)
1951	John Bulkley	11–5			
Joe Pease (CIAC) (1952)
1952	Joe Pease	8–5			
No team (discontinued) (1953–1955)
Chuck Sisson (CIAC) (1956)
1956	Chuck Sisson	4–4			
Noel McGregor (CIAC) (1957)
1957	Noel McGregor	4–5			
Total:		46–30			
National champion Postseason invitational champion Conference regular season champion Conference regular season and conference tournament champion Division regular season champion Division regular season and conference tournament champion Conference tournament champion

=== Five coaches in 10 years ===
From 1958 to 1968, Emporia State had five coaches, two of which were interim coaches. Bill Kerr served as the head coach from 1958 to 1962, and finished with a record of 58–55. After the 1962 season, Kerr left Emporia and took a head coaching job in Kentucky. In February 1963, Richard Niclai succeeded Kerr as head coach. For the one season that Niclai was head coach, his record was 11–8, and following his departure was Larry Ensminger, who led the team for two winning seasons. After the 1965 season, Ensminger left to become the head coach at the University of Texas–Pan American. In 1966, the last year in the Hornets played in the Central Intercollegiate Athletic Conference, Guy Owen served as the interim head coach, finishing the season with a 15–12 record. In 1967, Larry Cochell, an assistant coach at Utah State, took the reign as head coach as the Hornets began competing in their new conference, the Rocky Mountain Athletic Conference. Cochell's first year was a losing season going 16–17, but quickly turn things around in 1968 and 1969, eventually leading the team to their first NAIA World Series appearance in 1969. Cochell left to become the head coach at Creighton in Nebraska after the 1969 season with a combined record of 72–44.

Statistics overview
Five Coaches in 10 Years (1958–1969) — Year-by-year record
Season	Team	Overall	Conference	Standing	Postseason
Bill Kerr (Central Intercollegiate Athletic Conference) (1958–1962)
1958	Bill Kerr	5–7			
1959	Bill Kerr	11–11			
1960	Bill Kerr	12–15			
1961	Bill Kerr	13–10			
1962	Bill Kerr	17–12			
Bill Kerr:		58–55			
Richard Niclai (Central Intercollegiate Athletic Conference) (1963)
1963	Richard Niclai	11–8			
Richard Niclai:		11–8			
Larry Ensminger (Central Intercollegiate Athletic Conference) (1964–1965)
1964	Larry Ensminger	15–9			
1965	Larry Ensminger	11–10			
Larry Ensminger:		26–19			
Guy Owen (Central Intercollegiate Athletic Conference) (1966)
1966	Guy Owen	15–12			
Guy Owen:		15–12			
Larry Cochell (Rocky Mountain Athletic Conference) (1967–1969)
1967	Larry Cochell	16–17			
1968	Larry Cochell	25–14			
1969	Larry Cochell	29–13			NAIA World Series appearance
Larry Cochell:		72–44			
Total:		182–138			
National champion Postseason invitational champion Conference regular season champion Conference regular season and conference tournament champion Division regular season champion Division regular season and conference tournament champion Conference tournament champion

=== Jack Smitheran (1970–1973) ===
In 1970, Jack Smitheran, an assistant coach at Arizona State, was selected to replace Cochell. In his first season as head coach, he led the Hornets to their second straight NAIA World Series appearance. In 1972, Smitheran was nominated for NAIA Coach of the Year. After the 1973 season, Smitheran moved to Riverside, California to become the head coach at the University of California, Riverside.

Statistics overview
Jack Smitheran (1970–1973) — Year-by-year record
Season	Team	Overall	Conference	Standing	Postseason
Jack Smitheran (Rocky Mountain Athletic Conference) (1970–1973)
1970	Jack Smitheran	32–16	14–5		NAIA World Series appearance
1971	Jack Smitheran	33–19	10–1		
1972	Jack Smitheran	30–16			
1973	Jack Smitheran	28–10			
Total:		123–61			
National champion Postseason invitational champion Conference regular season champion Conference regular season and conference tournament champion Division regular season champion Division regular season and conference tournament champion Conference tournament champion

=== Dave Bingham era (1974–1987) ===
Under Bingham's leadership, the Hornets won 11 district titles, five regional crowns and eight conference championships. He led ESU to five NAIA World Series appearances and won the national championship in 1978. Bingham was selected NAIA District X Coach of the Year 10 times, NAIA Area III Coach of the Year six times, and was recognized as the national coach of the year in 1976, 1984 and 1987. Until April 25, 2018, Bingham was the all-time winningest coach at Emporia State with 557 wins. Bob Fornelli, current head coach, passed Bingham on April 25, 2018.

Statistics overview
Dave Bingham (1974–1987) — Year-by-year record
Season	Team	Overall	Conference	Standing	Postseason
Dave Bingham (Great Plains Athletic Conference) (1974–1976)
1974	Dave Bingham	23–19			
1975	Dave Bingham	33–16			NAIA Tournament
1976	Dave Bingham	32–18			NAIA Tournament
Central States Intercollegiate Conference
1977	Dave Bingham	45–11			NAIA Tournament
1978	Dave Bingham	40–20–2			NAIA National Champions
1979	Dave Bingham	33–17			NAIA Tournament
1980	Dave Bingham	46–18			NAIA Tournament
1981	Dave Bingham	29–28			NAIA Tournament
1982	Dave Bingham	42–26			NAIA Tournament
1983	Dave Bingham	35–19			NAIA Tournament
1984	Dave Bingham	50–19			NAIA World Series Appearance
1985	Dave Bingham	40–29			NAIA Tournament
1986	Dave Bingham	54–17			NAIA World Series appearance
1987	Dave Bingham	55–13			NAIA Runners-up
Total:		557–270–2			
National champion Postseason invitational champion Conference regular season champion Conference regular season and conference tournament champion Division regular season champion Division regular season and conference tournament champion Conference tournament champion

=== Brian Embery era (1988–2003) ===
Brian Embery, an assistant under Bingham at Emporia State, was selected as the next head coach at Emporia State in 1988 after Bingham left for the University of Kansas. In his first year as head coach, and the team's last season in the Central States Intercollegiate Conference, the Hornets advanced to the NAIA Tournament. In 1993 the Hornets captured the school's first-ever MIAA Championship and participated in the NCAA Division II Tournament for the first time, allowing Embery to be the MIAA Coach of the Year. As a member of the NAIA, Embery led the Hornets to four consecutive NAIA District 10 titles from 1988–91. Embery was named District 10 Coach of the Year four times, and 15 players under his leadership earned All-American status. Embery was also a four time MIAA Coach of the Year award recipient.

Statistics overview
Brian Embery (1988–2003) — Year-by-year record
Season	Team	Overall	Conference	Standing	Postseason
Brian Embery (Central States Intercollegiate Conference) (1988–2003)
1988	Brian Embery	49–19			NAIA Tournament
1989	Brian Embery	45–24			
Independent
1990	Brian Embery	46–23			
1991	Brian Embery	41–17			
Mid-America Intercollegiate Athletics Association
1992	Brian Embery	37–13			
1993	Brian Embery	14–15			
1994	Brian Embery	22–21			
1995	Brian Embery	19–17			
1996	Brian Embery	31–15			
1997	Brian Embery	22–15			
1998	Brian Embery	21–19			
1999	Brian Embery	18–28	10–12		
2000	Brian Embery	15–13–1	11–19		
2001	Brian Embery	25–21	16–14		
2002	Brian Embery	27–23	16–15		
2003	Brian Embery	25–21	20–11		
Total:		458–320–1			
National champion Postseason invitational champion Conference regular season champion Conference regular season and conference tournament champion Division regular season champion Division regular season and conference tournament champion Conference tournament champion

=== Bob Fornelli era (2004–2018) ===
After Embery resigned at the end of the 2003 season, Bob Fornelli, former Emporia State player under Embery, was named the head coach. Since 2004, Fornelli has taken the Hornets to the NCAA Tournament 12 times, has made 2 World Series appearances and a national runner-up finish in 2009. The Hornets finished the 2006 season by winning the MIAA Regular Season Championship and NCAA Central Region Championship, as well as advancing to the school's first NCAA World Series appearance.

In 2009, the Hornets advanced to the school's first NCAA national championship game in Cary, North Carolina. In 2014 the Hornets won the MIAA Tournament, and earned another trip to the NCAA Tournament.

On April 25, 2018, Fornelli became the winningest head baseball coach in Emporia State history with 558 wins. A week later on May 6, 2018, Fornelli captured his 900th win overall.

On June 4, 2018, local radio station KVOE (AM) reported that Fornelli had accepted the head coaching job at in-state MIAA rival, Pittsburg State University, after 15 seasons at his alma mater. He was formally introduced the next day, June 5.

Statistics overview
Bob Fornelli (2004–2018) — Year-by-year record
Season	Team	Overall	Conference	Standing	Postseason
Bob Fornelli (Mid-America Intercollegiate Athletics Association) (2004–2018)
2004	Bob Fornelli	36–22	18–11		NCAA Tournament
2005	Bob Fornelli	41–20	19–11		NCAA Tournament
2006	Bob Fornelli	48–13	25–4		NCAA World Series appearance
2007	Bob Fornelli	41–24	24–12		NCAA Tournament
2008	Bob Fornelli	50–10	32–4		NCAA Tournament
2009	Bob Fornelli	49–14	29–7		NCAA Runners-up
2010	Bob Fornelli	42–16	31–9		NCAA Tournament
2011	Bob Fornelli	43–12	37–7		NCAA Tournament
2012	Bob Fornelli	26–22	20–18		
2013	Bob Fornelli	27–22	24–18		
2014	Bob Fornelli	42–19	26–14		NCAA Tournament
2015	Bob Fornelli	39–16	23–12		NCAA Tournament
2016	Bob Fornelli	39–19	27–12		NCAA Tournament
2017	Bob Fornelli	42–13	29–6		NCAA Tournament
2018	Bob Fornelli	34–24	20–16		NCAA Tournament
Bob Fornelli:		599–266 (.692)	384–161 (.705)		
Total:		599–266 (.692)			
National champion Postseason invitational champion Conference regular season champion Conference regular season and conference tournament champion Division regular season champion Division regular season and conference tournament champion Conference tournament champion

=== Seth Wheeler (2019–2023) ===
On June 15, 2018, Hornet pitcher coach Seth Wheeler was promoted to head coach. Wheeler had been an assistant coach for the Hornets since 2016. Wheeler was fired at the conclusion of the 2023 season.

Statistics overview
Seth Wheeler (2019–2023) — Year-by-year record
Season	Team	Overall	Conference	Standing	Postseason
Emporia State Hornets (Mid-America Intercollegiate Athletics Association) (2019–2023)
2019	Emporia State	27–22	19–14		
2020	Emporia State	13–7	5–1		
2021	Emporia State	17–25	13–20		
2022	Emporia State	21–31	13–20		
2023	Emporia State	18–31	12–21		
Emporia State:		97–116 (.455)	62–76 (.449)		
Total:		97–116 (.455)			
National champion Postseason invitational champion Conference regular season champion Conference regular season and conference tournament champion Division regular season champion Division regular season and conference tournament champion Conference tournament champion

=== Brad Hill (2024–2025) ===
On May 26, 2023, Brad Hill, former Emporia State baseball player, was announced as the next head baseball coach. He resigned after the 2025 season.

Statistics overview
Season	Team	Overall	Conference	Standing	Postseason
Emporia State Hornets (Mid-America Intercollegiate Athletics Association) (2024–2025)
2024	Emporia State	21–29	11–22		
2024	Emporia State	23–25	16–20		
Emporia State:		44–54 (.449)	27–42 (.391)		
Total:		44–54 (.449)			
National champion Postseason invitational champion Conference regular season champion Conference regular season and conference tournament champion Division regular season champion Division regular season and conference tournament champion Conference tournament champion

== Venue and culture ==
=== Stadium ===
Glennen Field at Trusler Sports Complex opened in 1992. The field was named after Emporia State University President, Robert E. Glennen, who served from 1984 to 1997. In 2009, a new artificial turf was installed to Glennen Field to replace the infield. Glennen Field also received a new scoreboard and an indoor hitting facility during the 2009 season.

==== School colors ====
Black	Gold

Emporia State's official school colors are black and gold. They have been the colors since the school was founded in 1863, and until recently, the gold was Old gold.

=== Mascot ===
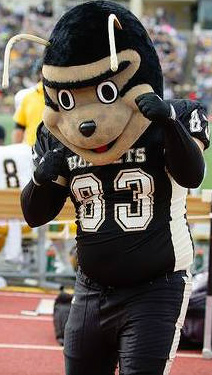
Corky the Hornet at an Emporia State football game.

Corky the Hornet is Emporia State University's mascot. In 1923 when the Emporia State was named to the Kansas State Teachers College, the athletic teams were known as the "Yaps". Many people were not fond of the name, most notably Emporia State coach, Vic Trusler. Trusler suggested to Cecil Carle of the Emporia Gazette that the university's athletic teams should be called the "Yellow Jackets". However, the name changed to "Hornets" due to the lack of newspaper space.

In 1933, the Teachers College had a student contest where students and staff could design a mascot for the college. Sophomore Paul Edwards, who graduated in 1937, designed Corky. Although hundreds of drawings were submitted, Edwards' Corky, a "human-like" hornet was selected. Corky was published in The Bulletin, the student newspaper for Emporia State University.

== Notable alumni ==
- Don Dennis, middle relief pitcher for the St. Louis Cardinals in the 1960s.
- Roy Evans, pitcher in the Major League Baseball in the 1890s and early 1900s.
- Bob Fornelli, former head coach for the Hornets.
- Brad Hill, former head baseball coach at Kansas State University. Head coach from 2024 to 2025.
- Fred Kipp, pitcher in Major League Baseball from 1957 to 1960; played with the Brooklyn/Los Angeles Dodgers and the New York Yankees.
- Steve Shifflett, pitcher for the Kansas City Royals in 1992.
