= KVOE =

KVOE may refer to:

- KVOE (AM), a radio station (1400 AM) licensed to Emporia, Kansas, United States
- KVOE-FM, a radio station (101.7 FM) licensed to Emporia, Kansas
