= Fornelli (surname) =

Fornelli is an Italian surname. Notable people with the surname include:

- Bob Fornelli (born 1966), American college baseball coach
- Cynthia M. Fornelli (fl. early 21st century), American accountant and securities lawyer
