= Kent Weiser =

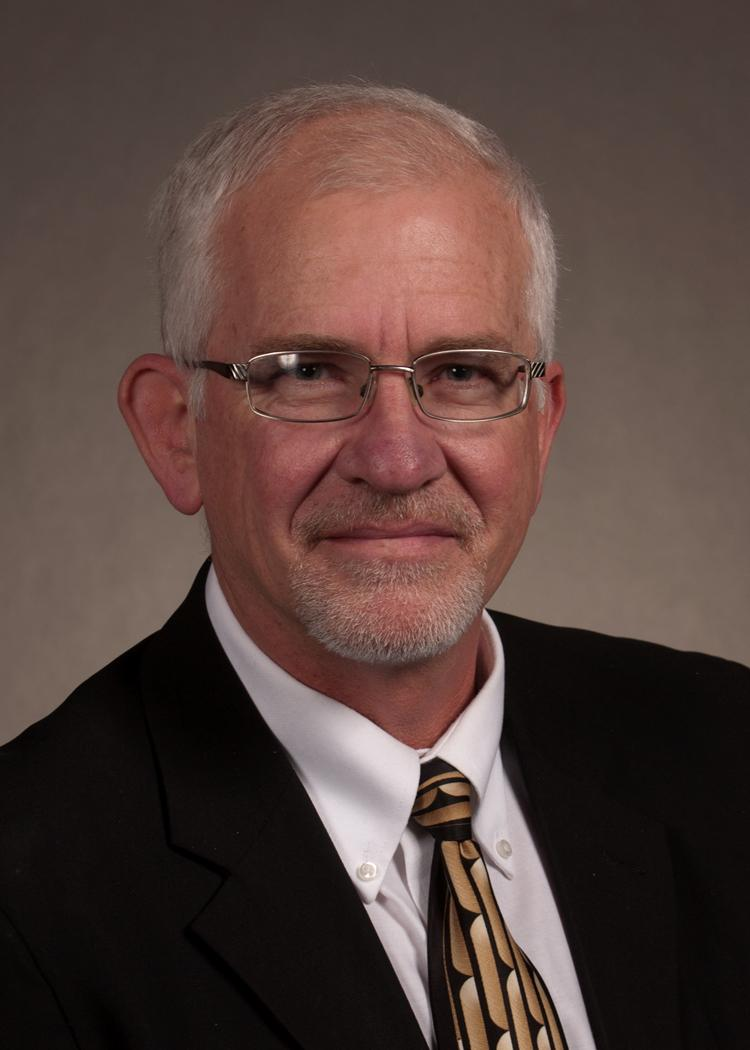

Biographical details
- Born: April 25, 1959 (age 67); Great Bend, Kansas
- Education: University of Kansas

Coaching career (HC unless noted)
- 1984–1988: Kansas

Administrative career (AD unless noted)
- 1981–1988: Kansas (Director of Tickets)
- 1989–1993: Ottawa (Kan.) (associate AD)
- 1993–1999: Oregon State (associate AD)
- 1999–2022: Emporia State

Kent L. Weiser (born April 25, 1959) is an American university sports administrator and former college golf coach. Weiser served the athletic director for Emporia State University, an NCAA Division II sports program in Emporia, Kansas, 1999 to 2022. Previously, Weiser was the associate athletics director at Oregon State University.

== Early years ==
Weiser was born in Great Bend, Kansas and attended Great Bend High School. After high school, Wesier attended the University of Kansas (KU) where he graduated with a bachelor's in psychology and a master's of science in sports administration.

== Career ==
After graduating from the University of Kansas, Weiser became the director of athletic ticketing in 1981 and in 1985, Weiser became KU's first athletic marketing director. In 1984, Weiser took over the women's golf program at Kansas, a position he held for four years. After seven years eight years in Lawrence, Weiser became the associate athletic director of development at Ottawa University in 1989. From 1993 to 1999, Weiser worked for Oregon State University as the associate athletics director for external affairs.

=== Emporia State ===
In 1999, Weiser was hired as the Emporia State Athletics Director, beginning August 8. During his time at Emporia State, Weiser has created a women's soccer program, and has updated athletics facilities for the football in 2005 and 2016, softball, and baseball teams. Also, Weiser has hired Emporia State's first coach from China – Bing Xu for Volleyball in 2005 – and Shaun Vandiver, Emporia State's first African-American coach. As a result, Weiser won the diversity award at Emporia State in 2015.

Weiser retired in March 2022, though his official last day was July 1, 2022.
