= Seth Wheeler (baseball) =

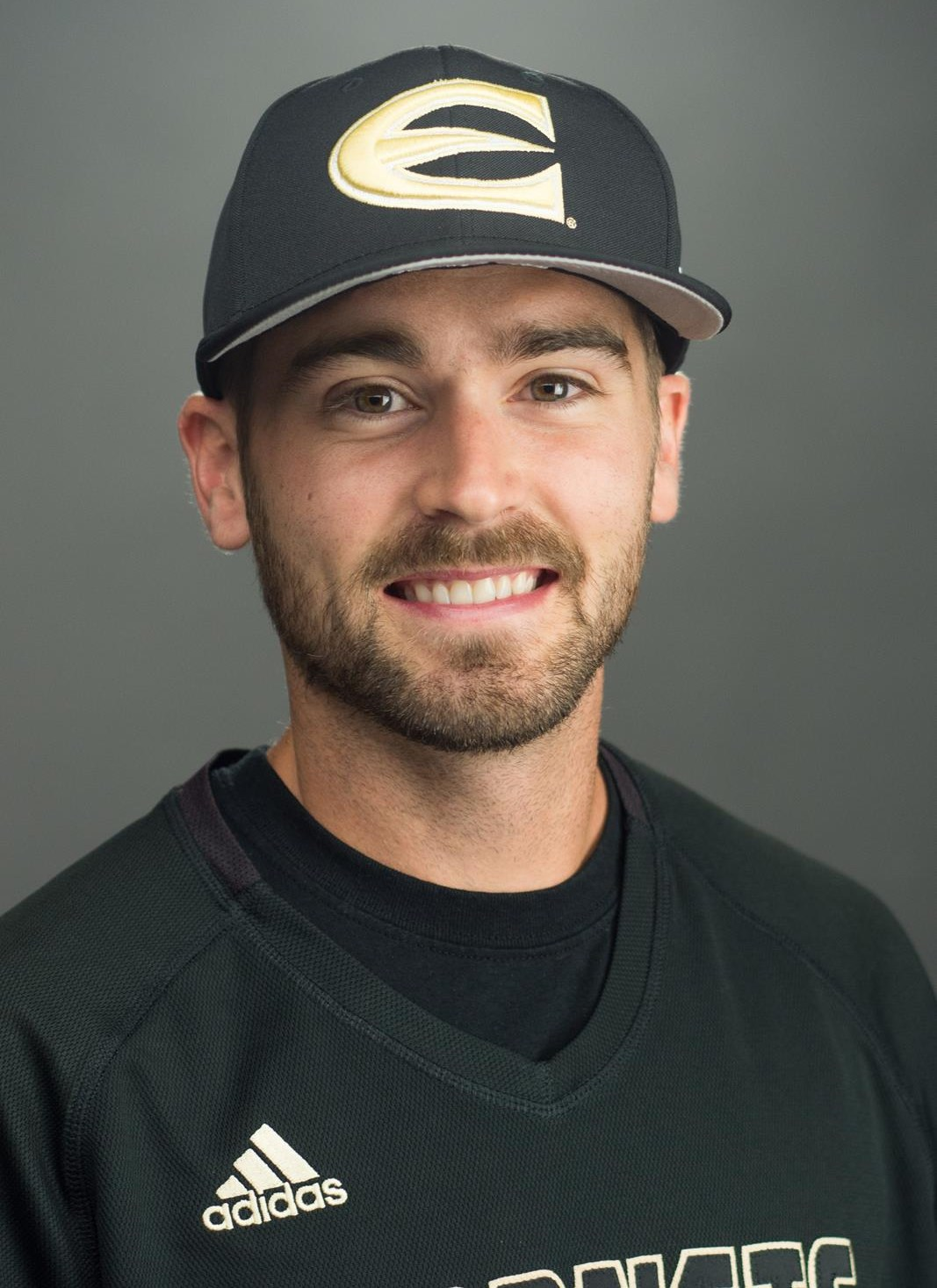

Biographical details
- Born: January 17, 1992 (age 34); Overland Park, Kansas, U.S.

Playing career
- 2010–2011: Butler CC
- 2012–2014: Central Missouri
- Position: Catcher

Coaching career (HC unless noted)
- 2015–2017: Junction City
- 2015–2016: Butler CC (assistant)
- 2017–2018: Emporia State (assistant)
- 2019–2023: Emporia State

Head coaching record
- Overall: 97–116 (college); 72–42 (summer baseball)

Seth M. Wheeler (born January 17, 1992) is an American former college baseball coach and previously served as head coach at Emporia State University from 2019–2023. Prior to Emporia State, Wheeler served as an assistant coach focusing on pitchers at Emporia State, and served as the Junction City Brigade manager from 2015 to 2017. Wheeler played for the University of Central Missouri.

== Career ==
Wheeler began his collegiate baseball career at Butler Community College where he played for two years as a catcher. Wheeler then transferred to the University of Central Missouri where he played for two years after redshirting in 2012.

=== Early career ===
In January 2014, Wheeler was named an assistant coach for the Junction City Brigade, a team he played for during his college years, and was promoted to manager eleven months later. During his time as the Junction City manager, Wheeler also served as an assistant coach at Butler Community College. Wheeler won the regular season and Mid-Plains League tournament championships during his time at Junction City.

=== Emporia State University ===
Wheeler joined Emporia State University's baseball coaching staff in 2016 as an assistant coach. During his three years as an assistant coach, he helped the Hornets advance to the Mid-America Intercollegiate Athletics Association (MIAA) and NCAA Tournaments each of the three years, winning the MIAA Tournament in 2017, and an overall record of 110–52, 76–34 conference record. On June 15, 2018, Wheeler was named the next head coach.

=== Head coach record ===
Statistics overview
Season	Team	Overall	Conference	Standing	Postseason
Junction City Brigade (Mid-Plains League) (2015–2017)
2015	Junction City	23–16			
2016	Junction City	27–11			
2017	Junction City	22–15			
Junction City:		72–42 (.632)			
Emporia State Hornets (Mid-America Intercollegiate Athletics Association) (2019–2023)
2019	Emporia State	27–22	19–14		
2020	Emporia State	13–7	5–1		
2021	Emporia State	17–25	13–20		
2022	Emporia State	21–31	13–20		
2022	Emporia State	18–31	12–21		
Emporia State:		97–116 (.455)	62–76 (.449)		
Total:		169–158 (.517)			
National champion Postseason invitational champion Conference regular season champion Conference regular season and conference tournament champion Division regular season champion Division regular season and conference tournament champion Conference tournament champion
