= Emporia State University Memorial Union =

Emporia University building

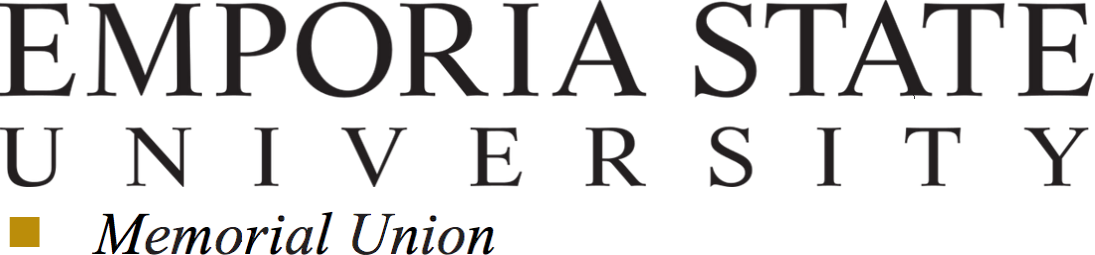

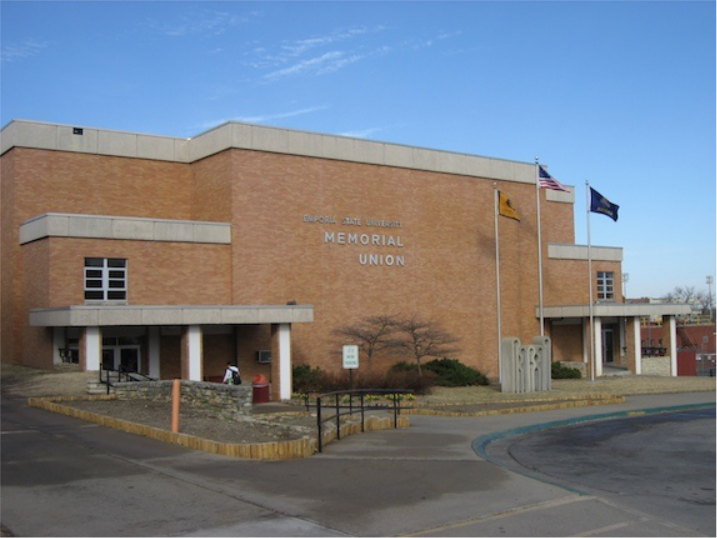
- Memorial Union before its renovation in 2010
- Interactive map of Emporia State University; Memorial Union

General information
- Status: Open
- Type: Student union
- Location: 1331 Market Street; Emporia, Kansas
- Coordinates: 38.414316°N 96.178011°W
- Groundbreaking: 1922
- Completed: 1924
- Opened: February 15, 1925; 100 years ago
- Renovated: 1990, 2012
- Cost: $24.5 million ($35.8 million in 2024 dollars)
- Owner: Emporia State University

Technical details
- Floor area: 168,000 square feet (16,000 m^{2})
- Lifts/elevators: 4

Renovating team
- Architect: Treanor Architects of Lawrence
- Renovating firm: Ferrel Construction

Other information
- Parking: Parking lot

Website
- www.emporia.edu/union

The Emporia State University Memorial Union is the student activity center on the Emporia State University campus in Emporia, Kansas.

== History ==
The Memorial Union was built to remember the World War I service members who were students at the Kansas State Teachers College and is the first student union on the west side of the Mississippi River. The three-story building houses conferences and campus meetings, as well as the dining hall for students living in the residence halls.

== Administration ==
The Union is a corporation operated by a director and two assistant directors. Staff includes almost 20 full-time staff members, and almost 50 student workers, and houses the most employees on the Emporia State campus.

== Services ==
- Student I.D.s and ticking – The I.D. Office is in charge of student IDs and tickets for campus events.
- Memorial Union Bookstore – The campus bookstore is operated by Barnes & Noble College Booksellers. The bookstore sells class textbooks as well as clothing.
- Center for Student Involvement – houses the student government offices.
- Conference and Scheduling – Schedules group conferences or events at the University

=== Corky's Cupboard ===
Official logo for Corky's Cupboard.

In Spring 2014, an idea was proposed to the university administration to provide an on-campus pantry for students living in poverty. As a collaboration between the CSI and Student Wellness Center, volunteers provided canned food items and collaborate with KVOE (AM) and the community to fill the shelves. Students are only allowed to retrieve items form the pantry once a week with 10 or fewer items.

== Dining ==
The Union houses the on-campus dining services through Sodexo and Coca-Cola. The area where the students eat is called the Hornets Nest. The Union also has two small stores, the Hornet Express) and Buzzcotti, which sells Starbucks coffee as well.

== Rooms ==
Throughout the year, conferences are held throughout the 30+ rooms in the Union.

- West Lobby
- Main Street (in front of CSI)
- East Lobby
- Hornets Nest
- Heritage Room
- Phi Kappa Phi Room
- East Entry Lounge
- Diversity Lounge
- Heart of America Room
- Webb Hall (can be divided into two rooms)
- Alumni Lounge
- Blue Key Leadership
- Greek Room
- Preston Family Room
- Skyline Dining Room
- Flint Hills Room (can combine with the Kanza Room)
- Kanza Room (can combine with the Flint Hills Room)
- Great Plains Room
- Roe R. Cross Room
- K.S.T.C. Ballroom
- Kansas State Normal Room (can combine with the Black & Gold and EKSC Rooms)
- Black & Gold Room (can combine with the KSN and EKSC Rooms)
- Emporia Kansas State College Room (can combine with the Black & Gold and KSN Rooms)
- Miller Family Room
- Phi Delta Kappa Room
- Xi Phi Room
- Bloomer Veteran's Hall of Honor
- Associated Student Government Senate Chambers (3rd floor)
- Google Room

== Martha the Ghost ==
Over the years, there have been many reports of a ghost named Martha. From 1925 to about 1950, single female faculty members lived on the third floor of the Memorial Union, now The Bulletin and Sunflower offices. The story is that Martha asked her boyfriend to marry her, and he said no. So that night, she hung herself in one of the rooms. Stories say that Martha haunts that area as well as the Memorial Union Bookstore. There have been reports of doors slamming, lights going on and off and objects being moved. The most common report is that the operation managers will lock the building up at night, turn around, and see that a light on the third floor is on. So, they would go shut it off, go back outside, turn around, only to find out that the light was still on, and they wouldn't go back.
