= Bill Quayle =

American university professor and athletic director

Biographical details
- Born: April 8, 1940 (age 86); Geneseo, Illinois
- Education: Central College (Iowa); Colorado State University; University of Wyoming

Coaching career (HC unless noted)
- 1972–1979: Phillips (Okla.)

Administrative career (AD unless noted)
- 1972–1979: Phillips (associate AD)
- 1979–1999: Emporia State
- 2000–2001: CSU–Pueblo (interim AD)

William Quayle (born April 8, 1940) is a former American university sports administrator and professor. Quayle worked as athletic director for Emporia State University, an NCAA Division II sports program in Emporia, Kansas.

== Career ==
Quayle began as an admissions counselor at Central College in Iowa in 1963, and then became the assistant director of admissions at Augustana College in Illinois in 1965. In 1968, he left for Phillips University in Oklahoma to become an associate professor, associate athletics director, and tennis coach. In 1979, Quayle accepted the position to become athletics director at Emporia State University.

=== Emporia State ===
Quayle began as director of athletics in 1979 and served for 20 years. During his tenure, he oversaw many facility improvements including the track resurfacing in Francis G. Welch Stadium and the construction of Trusler Sports Complex where baseball and softball games are played. The biggest project Quayle was head of was Emporia State's transition from the National Association of Intercollegiate Athletics to National Collegiate Athletic Association. With that move, he helped Emporia State transition form the Central States Intercollegiate Conference to Mid-America Intercollegiate Athletics Association. Quayle retired in 1999, the same year he was inducted into the Emporia State Athletics Hall of Honor.

=== Later career ===
From 2001 to 2002, Quayle served as the interim athletic director for Colorado State University–Pueblo.
