= Steve Rodecap =

American university sports administrator

David Spafford
Current position
- Title: Athletic director
- Team: Emporia State
- Conference: The MIAA

Biographical details
- Born: August 24, 1973 (age 53); Anderson, Indiana
- Education: Ball State University

Playing career
- 1992–1996: Ball State

Coaching career (HC unless noted)
- 1996–1998: Ball State (graduate assistant)
- 1998–1999: TCU (assistant)
- 1999–2002: Northern Illinois
- 2003–2023: Marquette

Administrative career (AD unless noted)
- 2023–2024: Emporia State (assistant AD)
- 2025–present: Emporia State

Head coaching record
- Overall: 312–247

Steven Rodecap (born August 24, 1973) is an American university sports administrator and ninth athletic director for Emporia State University, an NCAA Division II sports program in Emporia, Kansas. Previously, Rodecap served as the assistant athletic director for Emporia State and was a tennis coach prior to arriving in Emporia.

== Biography ==
Rodecap was born in Anderson, Indiana and graduated from Ball State University in 1996 with a degree in elementary education, and also competed on the Ball State Cardinals tennis team. Rodecap is married to Emily Rodecap, with whom he shares three children with.

== Career ==
While in college, Rodecap helped lead Ball State to three Mid-American Conference championships. After graduating from Ball State, he spent two seasons as a graduate coach, where Ball State won two more conference championships. Rodecap then served as an assistant coach at Texas Christian University, helping the Horned Frogs reach the second round of the NCAA Regionals.

Following his stint at Ball State, Rodecap spent four seasons as head men's tennis coach at Northern Illinois University, leading the program to its best win total since 1996–97 and a runner-up finish in the Mid-American Conference Tournament.

On July 29, 2003, Rodecap was announced as the men's tennis coach at Marquette University. Rodecap spent two decades as Director of Tennis and led the men's team posted a 262–201 record, earned a Big East Conference Tournament championship, reached the league finals four times, and achieved 14 winning seasons – making him the school's all-time wins leader and its longest-serving head tennis coach. He also led the women's team during his final three seasons.

=== Emporia State University ===
Rodecap joined Emporia State University Athletics as assistant athletic director for operations in 2023. From May to August 2025, Rodecap served as co-interim athletic director after David Spafford announced his retirement. On August 5, 2025, Rodecap was named permanent athletic director for Emporia State Athletics.
