= David Spafford =

American university sports administrator

Biographical details
- Born: April 25, 1959 (age 67); Belleville, Kansas
- Education: Kansas State University

Administrative career (AD unless noted)
- 1991–1994: UMKC (sales)
- 1994–2000: Kansas State (assistant AD)
- 2004–2004: Wichita State (associate AD)
- 2010–2011: New Mexico (assistant AD)
- 2016: Regis (interim)
- 2016–2022: Regis
- 2022–2025: Emporia State

David Spafford (born c. 1965) is an American university sports administrator and eighth athletic director for Emporia State University, an NCAA Division II sports program in Emporia, Kansas. Previously, Spafford was the athletics director at Regis University, and before that, served as the assistant or associate athletics director for several college institutions.

== Biography ==
Spafford was born in Belleville, Kansas, to Captain Gail Dean Spafford and Peggy Lorraine Slate. He graduated from Kansas State University in 1990 with a degree in political and social science, and also competed on the 1986 Kansas State Wildcats football team. Spafford is married to Bryanna Furman, with whom he shares six children with.

== Career ==
=== Early career ===
During his college and post-college years, Spafford served as an assistant high school football coach. He helped coach the 1988 Manhattan High School football team to an undefeated season, winning the state championship.

In 1991, Spafford joined the intercollegiate athletic world when he joined the University of Missouri–Kansas City (UMKC) Athletic Foundation as the basketball ticket sales coordinator. After three years at UMKC, Spafford began his eight-year career at his alma mater, Kansas State. At Kansas State, Spafford served as the assistant athletic director for development, connecting with university alumni, and fundraised millions of dollars for the Ahern Scholarship in 1998.

In 2000, Spafford joined Wichita State University as its the associate athletic director of development, where he oversaw all fundraising activities for Shocker Athletics. Spafford fundraised to renovate Charles Koch Arena, which led to the renaming after Charles Koch, along with Eck Stadium.

In 2004, Spafford left Wichita State to be an agent for State Farm, where he stayed until 2010.

=== New Mexico, other university foundations ===
For one year, beginning in 2010, joined the University of New Mexico as the athletics department major gifts assistant director and secured the lead gifts for the renovation of the basketball arena and the Lobo Baseball Field.

After a year at New Mexico, Spafford spent the next five years between the Kansas State University Foundation and Oklahoma State University–Stillwater Foundation.

=== Regis University ===
In July 2015, Spafford joined Regis University as the university advancement vice president with the goal of fundraising for athletics. Six months later in January 2016, Spafford was named the interim athletic director and was promoted to the full-time position in June 2016.

Spafford served on multiple committees for the Rocky Mountain Athletic Conference (RMAC), as well as the NCAA Division II during his years at Regis. Under his leadership, every sports teams had participated in the RMAC postseason play, with the lacrosse team advancing to the NCAA Division II national semifinals in both 2018 and 2019, and the Ranger volleyball team to the national semifinals in 2019 after reaching the Elite Eight in 2018.

Spafford spearheaded $6.5 million in fundraising to build a new athletic center, as well as renovate all locker rooms, athletic officers, a new ticket office, and sound and video boards as well as an indoor facility and artificial turf.

=== Emporia State University ===
On June 29, 2022, Spafford was announced as the eighth director of athletics at Emporia State. He began July 17, 2022 and retired effective June 25, 2025. During his tenure, he made several coaching and staffing changes, each program participated in postseason play, and improved the overall GPA of student athletes. He also created the Emporia State Sports Network, allowing Emporia State Athletics to reach other areas in the State of Kansas.
