= 2003 NCAA Division II baseball tournament =

- Season: 2003
- Finals site: Paterson Field; Montgomery, Alabama
- Champions: Central Missouri State (2nd title)
- Runner-up: Tampa (5th CWS Appearance)
- Winning coach: Brad Hill (1st title)
- MOP: Jay Hyland, OF (Columbus State)
- Attendance: 13,342

The 2003 NCAA Division II baseball tournament was the postseason tournament hosted by the NCAA to determine the national champion of baseball among its Division II members at the end of the 2003 NCAA Division II baseball season.

The final, eight-team double elimination tournament, also known as the College World Series, was played at Paterson Field in Montgomery, Alabama from May 24–31, 2003. This was the final Division II tournament at Paterson Field, with the event moving to the new Montgomery Riverwalk Stadium in 2004.

Central Missouri State defeated Tampa in the championship game, 11–4, to claim the Mules' second Division II national title and first since 1994.

== Bracket ==
=== College World Series ===
First Rounds; May 24–27, 2003	Second Rounds; May 26–28, 2003
Slippery Rock	1
Franklin Pierce	2
Franklin Pierce	4
Central Missouri State	11
Central Missouri State	3
Grand Valley State	2
Bracket One
Slippery Rock	8
Grand Valley State	9
Kennesaw State	7
Grand Valley State	5
Kennesaw State	9
UC Davis	5
Kennesaw State	0
Tampa	6
Tampa	14
Abilene Christian	2
Bracket Two
UC Davis	5
Abilene Christian	3
Franklin Pierce	5
UC Davis	3

Semifinals; May 29, 2003
Central Missouri State	6
Kennesaw State	5
Tampa	18
Franklin Pierce	9

Championship; May 31, 2003
Central Missouri State	11
Tampa	4

== See also ==
- 2003 NCAA Division I baseball tournament
- 2003 NCAA Division III baseball tournament
- 2003 NAIA World Series
