= Trusler Sports Complex =

Sports facility in Emporia, Kansas, US

Coordinates: 38.419496°N 96.170161°W

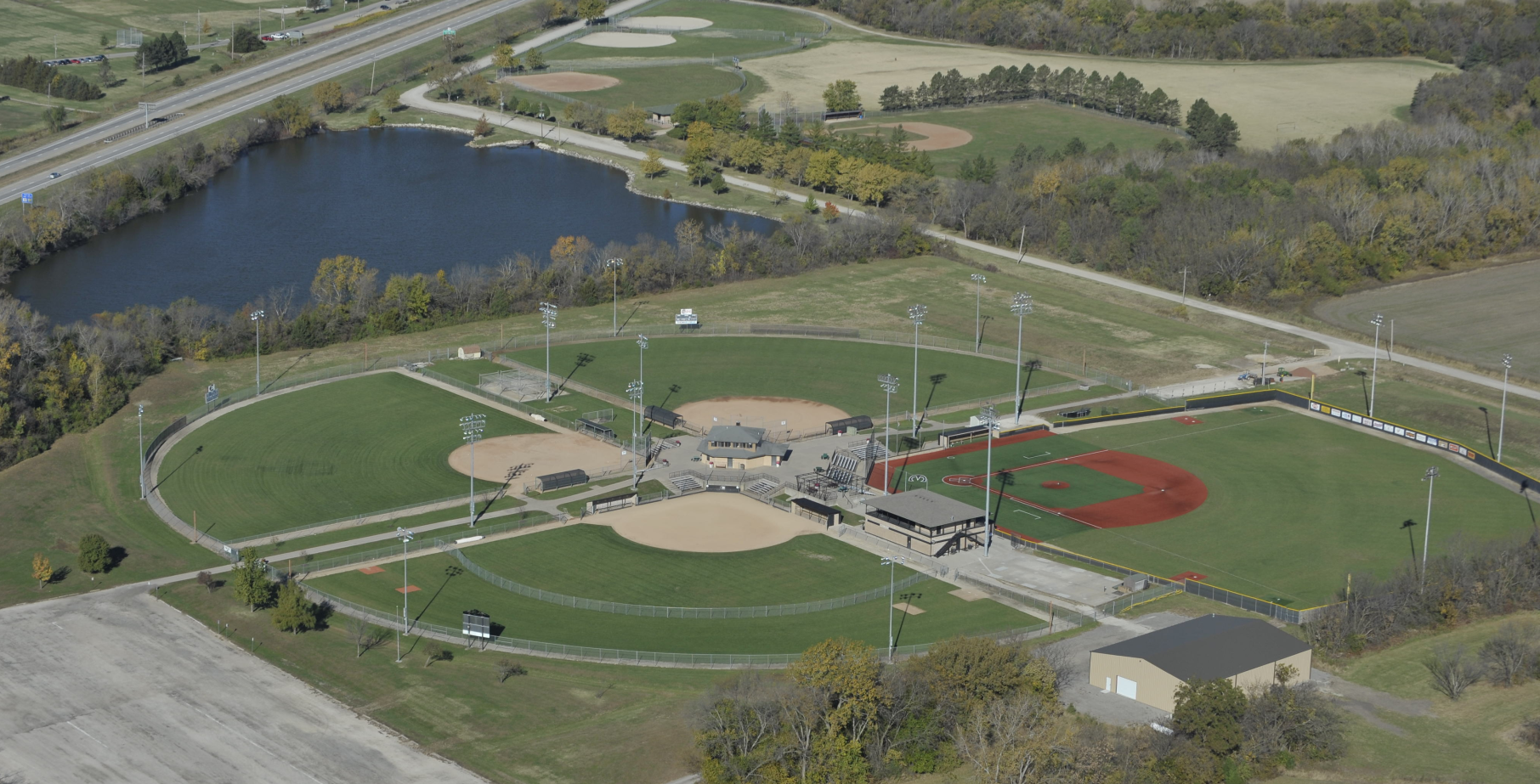
- Trusler Sports Complex in 2012 before Turnbull Field received articficial turf in the infield
- Interactive map of Trusler Sports Complex
- Location: Emporia, Kansas
- Owner: Emporia State University
- Operator: Emporia State University

Construction
- Opened: 1992

Tenant
- Emporia State University

Trusler Sports Complex is a sports facility located in Emporia, Kansas. The complex consists of four fields – one baseball, three softball – and is home to the Emporia State baseball and softball teams.

== History ==
The complex opened in 1992 after a local-based not-for profit foundation – Trusler Foundation – donated money to Emporia State University. Both Emporia State baseball and softball teams compete here; Baseball on Glennen Field (named after Emporia State's 13th president), and softball on Turnbull Field (named after J. Michael Turnbull, who was president of Trusler Foundation). The two other softball fields – Cannon Field and Thomas Field – are named in honor of Joe Cannon who provided the land for the complex and Tom D. Thomas, treasurer and trustee of the Trusler Foundation.

=== Renovations ===
Since its opening in 1992, Trusler has seen many improvements. In 2006, a clubhouse was built. In 2009, Glennen Field received artificial turf for the infield, with softball receiving the same in 2014. In 2014, nearly $400,000 was donated to improved dugouts and build a new ticket booth.
