= KVOE-FM =

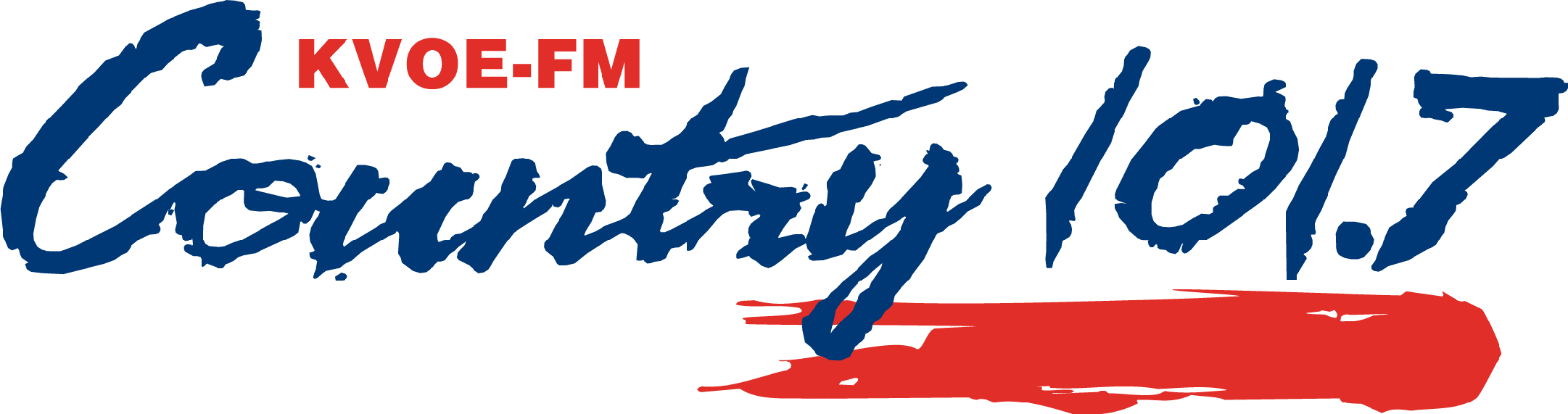
- Emporia, Kansas; United States
- Broadcast area: Lyon County, Kansas and surrounding counties
- Frequency: 101.7 MHz
- Branding: Country 101.7 FM

Programming
- Format: Country music

Ownership
- Owner: Emporia's Radio Stations, Inc.
- Sister stations: KVOE; KFFX

History
- First air date: May 2, 1985
- Former call signs: KEGS (1984-1994)
- Call sign meaning: "Kansas' Voice of Emporia"

Technical information
- Licensing authority: FCC
- Facility ID: 37128
- Class: A
- ERP: 3,200 watts
- HAAT: 91 meters (299 ft)
- Transmitter coordinates: 38°21′45.1″N 96°7′1″W

Links
- Public license information: Public file; LMS
- Webcast: Listen live
- Website: www.kvoe.com

KVOE-FM (101.7 FM) is a radio station broadcasting a country music format, broadcasting as "Country 101.7 FM". The station is located in Emporia, Kansas, where it is also licensed. KVOE-FM is owned by Emporia's Radio Stations, Inc.

== History ==
KVOE-FM began broadcasting as KEGS on May 2, 1985. The "GS" in KEGS were the initials of Greg Steckline of Steckline Communications of Wichita (the first licensee). In Emporia, there was a KVOE-FM on 104.9 MHz between 1966 and 1975; that station has since become KFFX. On August 30, 1994, KEGS became the new KVOE-FM at 101.7 MHz under new owner Emporia's Radio Stations, Inc.

== Awards ==
KVOE-FM has won numerous awards from the Kansas Association of Broadcasters (KAB). In 2005, KVOE-FM won Station of the Year. In 2011, KVOE-FM won KAB's Website of the Year. In 2010, KVOE-FM won the KAB's Tony Jewell Community Service Award. On April 17, 2012, KVOE-FM's general manager Ron Thomas, went to Las Vegas, Nevada, to accept the Crystal Radio Award from the National Association of Broadcasters, one of which 10 out of 50 radio stations are awarded.

== Community service ==
Every year, KVOE puts on a Drive for Food campaign in partnership with The Salvation Army collecting "non-perishable food items" for their food pantry. KVOE also hosts an auction over the radio for the National Teachers Hall of Fame. In 2014, KVOE partnered with Emporia State University to help defeat the school's rival, Washburn University.

== Programming ==
=== Sports ===
KVOE-FM broadcasts surrounding area high school football and basketball games, with an "Area Coaches Corner" throughout the week. KVOE-FM also broadcasts Kansas State Wildcats football and basketball games, as well as Kansas City Chiefs football games.
