= Dave Bingham =

American college baseball coach

Biographical details
- Born: November 19, 1948 (age 77); Tucson, Arizona, U.S.

Playing career
- 1967–1968: Arizona
- 1969–1972: Emporia State
- Position: Third baseman

Coaching career (HC unless noted)
- 1974–1987: Emporia State
- 1988–1995: Kansas
- 2004: New Mexico (assistant)
- 2006–2011: Nebraska (assistant)

Head coaching record
- Overall: 806–495–2

Accomplishments and honors

Championships
- 1 NAIA (1978)

David Bingham (born November 19, 1948) is a former college baseball coach.

Bingham helped Emporia State to the NAIA World Series twice as a player. After playing briefly in as a shortstop in the Washington Senators system (hitting .174/.309/.207 in 34 games for the 1971 Geneva Senators), he was head coach at his alma mater, Kansas State Normal School/Emporia State from 1973 to 1987, going 557–270–2. From 1988 to 1995, he was at the University of Kansas, leading the Kansas Jayhawks baseball team to the 1993 College World Series while going 249–225 in eight seasons. In 2004, he was an assistant coach at the University of New Mexico for the baseball team and from August 2005 until 2011 he was an assistant coach at Nebraska.

Bingham was also an assistant coach for the U.S. team in the 1984 Summer Olympics, 1988 Baseball World Cup, and 1988 Summer Olympics.

== Head coaching record ==
Record table
| Season | Team | Overall | Conference | Standing | Postseason |
|---|---|---|---|---|---|
Emporia State Hornets (Great Plains Athletic Conference) (1974–1976)
| 1974 | Emporia State | 23–19 | | | |
| 1975 | Emporia State | 33–16 | | | NAIA Tournament |
| 1976 | Emporia State | 32–18 | | | NAIA Tournament |
Emporia State Hornets (Central States Intercollegiate Conference) (1977–1987)
| 1977 | Emporia State | 45–11 | | | NAIA Tournament |
| 1978 | Emporia State | 40–20–2 | | | NAIA National champions |
| 1979 | Emporia State | 33–17 | | | NAIA Tournament |
| 1980 | Emporia State | 46–18 | | | NAIA Tournament |
| 1981 | Emporia State | 29–28 | | | NAIA Tournament |
| 1982 | Emporia State | 42–26 | | | NAIA Tournament |
| 1983 | Emporia State | 35–19 | | | NAIA Tournament |
| 1984 | Emporia State | 50–19 | | | NAIA World Series Appearance |
| 1985 | Emporia State | 40–29 | | | NAIA Tournament |
| 1986 | Emporia State | 54–17 | | | NAIA World Series appearance |
| 1987 | Emporia State | 55–13 | | | NAIA Runners-up |
| Emporia State: | | 557–270–2 | | | |
Kansas Jayhawks (Big Eight Conference) (1988–1995)
| 1988 | Kansas | 25–34 | 5–19 | 7th | |
| 1989 | Kansas | 32–35 | 8–16 | 5th | |
| 1990 | Kansas | 27–31 | 10–14 | 6th | |
| 1991 | Kansas | 31–28 | 11–13 | 5th | |
| 1992 | Kansas | 25–28 | 8–16 | 6th | |
| 1993 | Kansas | 45–18 | 17–9 | 2nd | College World Series |
| 1994 | Kansas | 40–18 | 17–9 | 3rd | Atlantic II Regional |
| 1995 | Kansas | 24–33 | 9–17 | 6th | |
| Kansas: | | 249–225 | | | |
| Total: | | 806–495–2 | | | |
National champion Postseason invitational champion Conference regular season champion Conference regular season and conference tournament champion Division regular season champion Division regular season and conference tournament champion Conference tournament champion
