= John E. Visser =

American education administrator

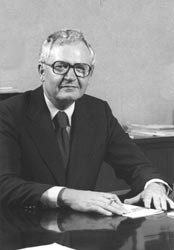

13th President of Emporia State University
- In office February 15, 1967 – June 30, 1984
- Preceded by: John E. King
- Succeeded by: Robert E. Glennen

Personal details
- Born: John Evert Visser; April 24, 1920 Orange City, Iowa, U.S.
- Died: June 8, 1997 (aged 77) Topeka, Kansas, U.S.
- Resting place: Emporia, Kansas, U.S.
- Spouse: Virginia Schuyler (m. 1946)
- Education: Hope College (B.A); University of Iowa (M.A.; PhD)
- Profession: Educator

John Evert Visser (April 24, 1920 – June 8, 1997) was an American education administrator, mostly known for serving as the twelfth president of Emporia State University in Emporia, Kansas. Before serving as president of Emporia State, Visser was an assistant to the president at Ball State University, and held several administrative jobs in higher education. After serving as president of Emporia State, Visser served as several interim titles across the United States.

== Early life and education ==
Visser was born in Orange City, Iowa, on April 24, 1920. After high school, Visser received three different degrees from two universities: his bachelor of arts from Hope College in 1943, and in 1947, his master of arts and doctorate degrees from The University of Iowa. Visser joined served in World War II from 1944 to 1946.

== Career ==
=== Early career ===
After completing college, Visser began his 40-plus year career as an assistant professor in history at his alma mater in 1949. From 1949 to 1957, Visser also served as the Dean of Men from 1955 to 1956 at Hope College. After that, Visser held several administrative jobs in higher education at a couple of Michigan universities. After working at both WMU and GRJC, Visser was the Ball State University president's executive assistant from 1962 until January 1967.

=== Kansas State Teachers College ===
Visser began his tenure as KSTC's twelfth president on the February 15, 1967. Because Visser was very student-oriented, the university senates were established. The most notable accomplishment Visser is known for during his time at KSTC is organizing the school into different academic schools with departments. Some other significant changes during Visser's tenure was the Teachers College hit an all-time enrollment of 7,150 in 1969, and when KSTC changed its name to Emporia Kansas State College in July 1974 and then to its current name, Emporia State University in April 1977, when the school was granted university status. Visser retired on June 30, 1984, with Robert E. Glennen succeeding him.

=== After Emporia State ===
After serving as president of Emporia State, Visser took a year off and served as an advisor for the University of Alaska system in 1984 and 1985. After being in Alaska for two years, Visser served as the acting vice-chancellor at the University of Wisconsin–Green Bay and the University of Alaska Southeast's acting chancellor.
