= Corky the Hornet =

Mascot of the athletic teams of Emporia State University

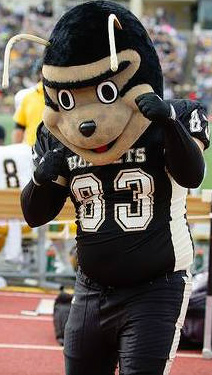
- Corky the Hornet at an Emporia State football game.
- University: Emporia State University
- Conference: MIAA
- Description: Hornet
- First seen: February 15, 1933

Corky the Hornet is the mascot of the Emporia State Hornets, the athletic teams of Emporia State University. Paul Edwards created the mascot when he was a student at the school, which was then known as Kansas State Teachers College.

== History ==
=== Creation of Corky ===
Original drawing of Corky the Hornet

In 1923, the teams were known as the "Yaps", but it was not a popular name. Men's basketball coach Vic Trusler suggested the name "Yellow Jackets". This was later changed to "Hornets".

In 1933, the Kansas State Teachers College had a student contest where students and staff could design a mascot for the college. Sophomore Paul Edwards, who graduated in 1937, designed Corky. Many students sent in their drawings of a mascot, but they chose Edwards' Corky, a "human-like" hornet. Corky was published in The Bulletin, the student newspaper for Emporia State University. Edwards originally came in second in the contest, but the winner, a student named Richard Weller, withdrew when Edwards improved his design for Corky.

=== Paul Edwards ===
Paul Edwards was a member of the tennis team at Kansas State Teachers College. The team reached the state finals in 1937. He continued his tennis career after college, and enlisted in the United States Navy after the attack on Pearl Harbor in 1941. He served for three years, stationed at Naval Magazine Indian Island, where (among other duties) he trained gunnery crews in the recognition of enemy aircraft. After the war, he was an animation artist at Walt Disney Animation Studios. He worked on the design of Mr. Bluebird, featured in the song "Zip-a-Dee-Doo-Dah" from the 1946 film Song of the South, as well as taking part in the creation of artwork for other films. Edwards lived in Santa Barbara, California, and designed a unique "Corky" for special events such as homecoming plays, until his death on March 9, 2018 at the age of 103.

== Duties ==
Official Corky logo used by the university

The primary duty of Corky is to be an ambassador of ESU, roaming the sidelines at football and basketball games giving hugs to youngsters. Corky is often involved in entertaining children. Corky is also present at most major university events such as athletic competitions, like Tradition Night, Homecoming, parades, etc. Corky is also present at all Hornet Connections, where students enroll and learn more about Emporia State University.
