= Bob Fornelli =

American college baseball coach (born 1966)

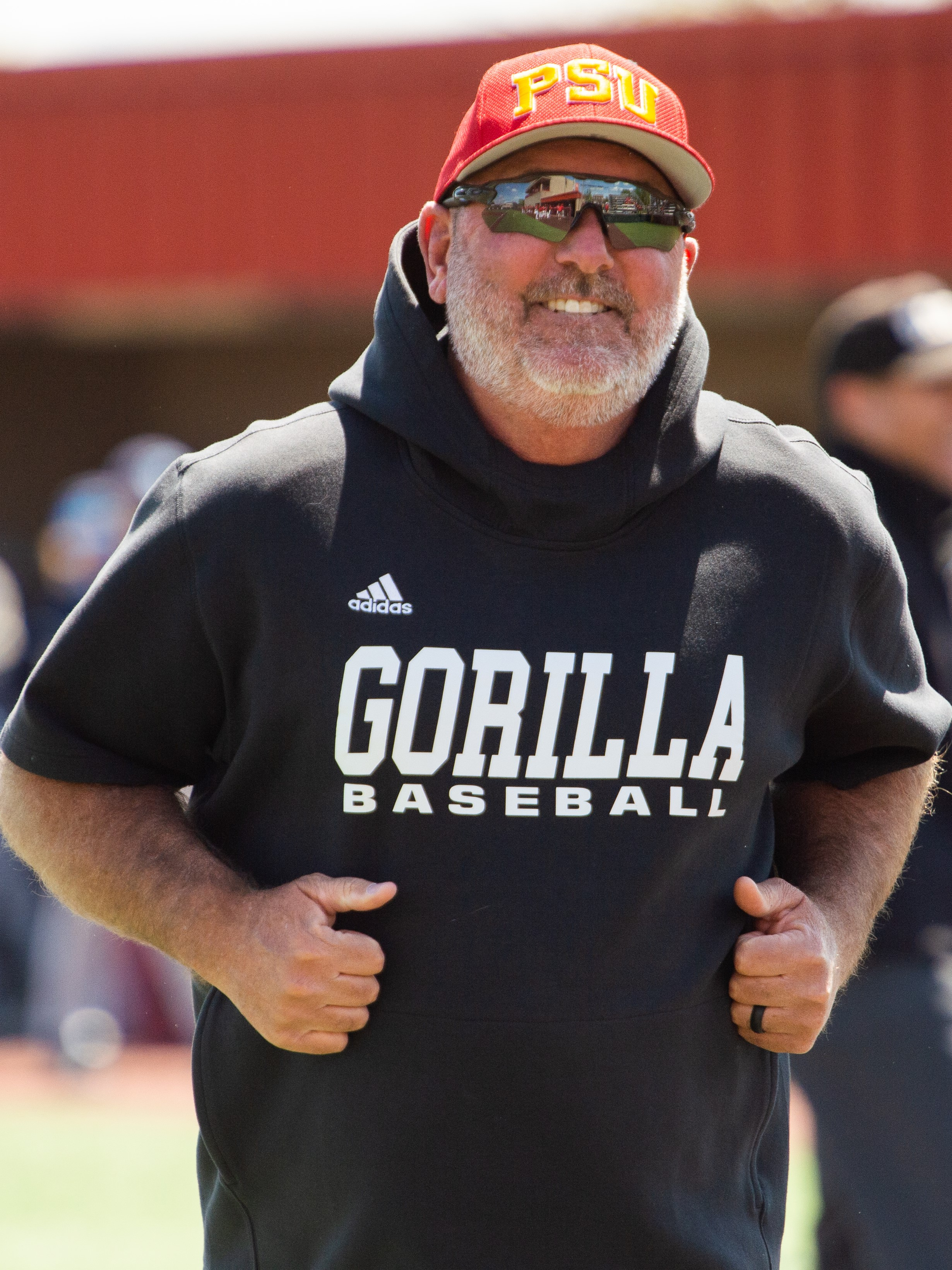
- PSU Baseball Coach Bob Fornelli on Game Day

Biographical details
- Born: August 9, 1966 (age 60); Lenexa, Kansas

Playing career
- 1988–1991: Emporia State
- Position: Catcher

Coaching career (HC unless noted)
- 1991–1996: Butler CC (pitching)
- 1996–2003: Fort Hays State
- 2004–2018: Emporia State
- 2019–2025: Pittsburg State

Head coaching record
- Overall: 1120–495 (.693)
- Tournaments: 25–28 (.472)

Accomplishments and honors

Championships
- 5 MIAA regular season 2 MIAA Tournament; 4 RMAC regular season 1 RMAC Tournament

Awards
- 2× RMAC Coach of the Year (1997, 2000); West Region Coach of the Year (2000)

Robert William Fornelli (born August 9, 1966) is a retired American college baseball coach, who coached at Pittsburg State University from 2019 to 2025. Previously, Fornelli coached at his alma mater, Emporia State University, from 2004 to 2018 where he guided the Hornets to five Mid-America Intercollegiate Athletics Association regular season championships and two conference tournament championships, 13 trips to the NCAA Tournament, two World Series appearances and a national runner-up finish. Fornelli was the coach at Fort Hays State from 1996 to 2003.

== Career ==
After graduating from Emporia State in 1991 and playing four years at Emporia State, Fornelli spent five seasons as Butler Community College's pitching coach.

=== Fort Hays State ===
In 1996, Fornelli became head coach of the Fort Hays State Tigers. During his seven years, Fornelli compiled a 306–113 record. In 2003, the Tigers won the Rocky Mountain Athletic Conference regular season and postseason tournament titles. Fornelli is the winningest coach in FHSU history and led the Tigers to the RMAC championship four times in his seven years. Fornelli led FHSU to the NCAA Division II national championship game in 2000 and was in the NCAA regional tournament six times.

=== Emporia State ===
In May 2003, Fornelli left Fort Hays State for his alma mater. former Emporia State player under Embery, was named the head coach. Since 2004, Fornelli has taken the Hornets to the NCAA Tournament 10 times, have made 2 World Series appearances and a national runner-up finish in 2009. The Hornets finished the 2006 season by winning the MIAA Regular Season Championship and NCAA Central Region Championship, as well as advancing to the school's first NCAA World Series appearance.

In 2009, the Hornets advanced to the school's first NCAA national championship game in Cary, North Carolina. In 2014, the Hornets won the MIAA Tournament, and earned another trip to the NCAA Tournament. In 2016, Fornelli picked up his 800th overall win.

On April 25, 2018, Fornelli became the winningest head baseball coach in Emporia State history with 558 wins. A week later on May 6, 2018, Fornelli captured his 900th win overall.

=== Pittsburg State ===
On June 4, 2018, local radio station KVOE (AM) reported that Fornelli had accepted the head coaching job at in-state MIAA rival, Pittsburg State University, after 15 seasons at his alma mater. He was formally introduced the next day, June 5.

Fornelli, who retired at the conclusion of the 2025 season, finished his career at Pitt State with a 215–116 record, making him the second all-time winningest coach at the university.

=== Head coach record ===
Record table
Head coach record (1996–2025) — Year-by-year record
Season	Team	Overall	Conference	Standing	Postseason
Fort Hays State Tigers (Rocky Mountain Athletic Conference) (1997–2003)
1997	Fort Hays State	48–15			NCAA Tournament
1998	Fort Hays State	44–14			NCAA Tournament
1999	Fort Hays State	35–22			NCAA World Series appearance
2000	Fort Hays State	54–12			NCAA Runners-up
2001	Fort Hays State	37–19			NCAA Tournament
2002	Fort Hays State	43–16			
2003	Fort Hays State	45–15			
Fort Hays State:		306–113 (.730)			
Emporia State Hornets (Mid-America Intercollegiate Athletics Association) (2004–2018)
2004	Emporia State	36–22	18–11		NCAA Tournament
2005	Emporia State	41–20	19–11		NCAA Tournament
2006	Emporia State	48–13	25–4		NCAA World Series appearance
2007	Emporia State	41–24	24–12		NCAA Tournament
2008	Emporia State	50–10	32–4		NCAA Tournament
2009	Emporia State	49–14	29–7		NCAA Runners-up
2010	Emporia State	42–16	31–9		NCAA Tournament
2011	Emporia State	43–12	37–7		NCAA Tournament
2012	Emporia State	26–22	20–18		
2013	Emporia State	27–22	24–18		
2014	Emporia State	42–19	26–14		NCAA Tournament
2015	Emporia State	39–16	23–12		NCAA Tournament
2016	Emporia State	39–19	27–12		NCAA Tournament
2017	Emporia State	42–13	29–6		NCAA Tournament
2018	Emporia State	34–24	20–16		NCAA Tournament
Emporia State:		599–266 (.692)	384–161 (.705)		
Pittsburg State (Mid-America Intercollegiate Athletics Association) (2019–present)
2019	Pittsburg State	31–21	20–13		
2020	Pittsburg State	14–8	4–2		
2021	Pittsburg State	30–16	21–12		
2022	Pittsburg State	31–21	22–11		
2023	Pittsburg State	33–20	21–12		
2024	Pittsburg State	34–18	22–11		
2025	Pittsburg State	42–12	27–9		NCAA Division II Regionals
Pittsburg State:		215–116 (.650)	137–70 (.662)		
Total:		1120–495 (.693)			
National champion Postseason invitational champion Conference regular season champion Conference regular season and conference tournament champion Division regular season champion Division regular season and conference tournament champion Conference tournament champion
