= Cynthia M. Fornelli =

Cindy Fornelli is an American business leader, former securities lawyer, and a graduate of Purdue University and The George Washington University Law School.

She retired in 2019 as Executive Director of the Center for Audit Quality (CAQ) and is currently a public company board member.

== Career ==
Fornelli is currently a public company board director. She previously served as the first Executive Director at the CAQ where she was responsible for carrying out the mission and vision of the CAQ’s Governing Board, which is composed of eight leaders from public company audit firms, the American Institute of CPAs, and three independent public members. She also served as an ex-officio board member at the organization.

Prior to her role at the CAQ, Fornelli held positions at Bank of America (Regulatory and Conflicts Management Executive) and the U.S. Securities and Exchange Commission (Deputy Director of the Division of Investment Management).

Fornelli has been interviewed for news outlets including Fox Business News, National Public Radio, USA Today, The Washington Post, The Wall Street Journal, Financial Times, the Associated Press, Reuters, Dow Jones Newswires, The Hill, and Bloomberg News.

She is a regular commentator in trade magazines and featured speaker at professional conferences.

== Awards ==
Fornelli has been named one of Accounting Today’s Top 100 Most Influential People.

In 2017, she was named for the ninth time to the NACD Directorship list of the 100 most influential people in corporate governance. She has been named to CPA Practice Advisor’s list of the Most Powerful Women in Accounting, was included on Compliance Week’s “Top Minds 2017” list, and has received the Special Award of Merit from the American Accounting Association’s Auditing Section.

== Board memberships ==
Fornelli currently is an independent director at Triple Point Venture Growth (TPVG) and an independent trustee at Professionally Managed Portfolios, where she chairs the audit committee. Previously, Fornelli held leadership roles at the following organizations:

- Board of International Women’s Forum Suncoast
- Advisory Board of the Lynn Pippenger School of Accountancy at the University of South Florida
- Treasurer on the Securities and Exchange Commission Historical Society Board of Trustees,
- Trustee of the Association of SEC Alumnae
- National Association of Corporate Directors’ 2010 Blue Ribbon Commission on the Audit Committee and 2009 Blue Ribbon Commission on Risk Governance.

She is a member of the Washington, D.C. Bar and the American Bar Association.
