= Brad Hill (baseball) =

American baseball coach and player (born 1962)

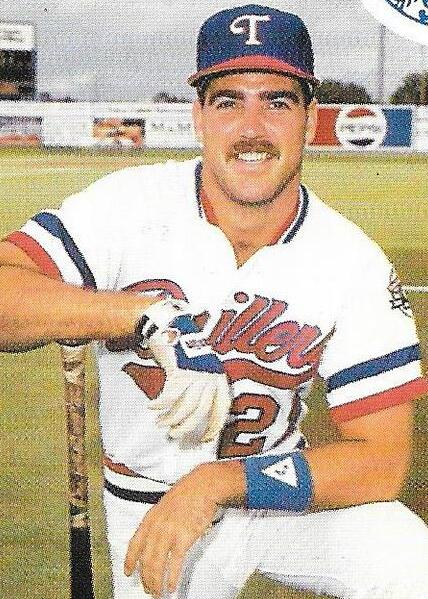
- Hill with the Tulsa Drillers c. 1987

Current position
- Title: Head coach
- Team: Emporia State
- Conference: The MIAA

Biographical details
- Born: May 2, 1962 (age 64); Galva, Kansas, U.S.

Playing career
- 1982–1985: Emporia State

Coaching career (HC unless noted)
- 1988–1990: Hutchinson CC
- 1991–1994: Kansas (asst.)
- 1995–2003: Central Missouri State
- 2004–2018: Kansas State
- 2022: Northwestern (asst.)
- 2023–present: Emporia State

Head coaching record
- Overall: 880–463–3 (.655)

Accomplishments and honors

Championships
- NCAA Division II National Champion (2003); Big 12 Regular season Champion (2013); 9x MIAA Regular season Champion (1995–2003); 8x MIAA Tournament champion (1995–98; 2000–03)

Awards
- Division II National Coach of the Year (2003); Big 12 Coach of the Year (2009, 2013); 7x MIAA COY (1996, 1998–2000, 2002–03)

Brad L. Hill (born May 2, 1962) is an American baseball coach and former player, who is the head baseball coach of the Emporia State Hornets. He played college baseball at Emporia State from 1982 to 1985. He then served as the head coach of the Hutchinson Blue Dragons (1988–1990), Central Missouri State Mules (1995–2003) and the Kansas State Wildcats (2004–2018). Under him, the Wildcats have appeared in six consecutive Big 12 baseball tournaments (2007–2012). His teams have also qualified for three NCAA Division I Baseball Championships. Hill was the coach at Central Missouri State from 1995 to 2003. He won a Division II National Championship there in 2003, and was National Runner-up in 2001.

== Playing career ==
Hill played collegiately at Emporia State University. He capped off his four-year career by helping Emporia State to the 1984 NAIA College World Series. Hill still owns a majority of the Hornets' offensive marks, including the career marks for games played (244), at-bats (809), hits (302), runs scored (241), RBIs (264), doubles (71) and home runs (47).

He was drafted by the Texas Rangers in the 1984 Major League Baseball draft in the 35th round (778th overall). He advanced as high as Class AA.

== Coaching career ==
Hill was the head coach at Hutchinson Community College in Hutchinson, Kansas, for three seasons from 1988–90, compiling an 83–50 overall record. His 1989 squad posted a school-record 34 wins, while in 1990 the Dragons registered the highest winning percentage in school history with a 32–9 mark.

Hill was an assistant coach at the University of Kansas for 4 seasons under his college coach, Dave Bingham. As the Jayhawks' hitting coach and recruiting coordinator from 1991–94, he helped Kansas to a 144–92 overall record and a pair of NCAA tournament appearances, including the school's first and only trip to the College World Series in 1993. The 1993 team broke school records for most hits, doubles, triples, home runs and stolen bases in a single-season. The Jayhawks posted a 10–7 record against the Wildcats during Hill's tenure in Lawrence.

Hill was hired by Central Missouri State in 1995. He led the Mules to a National Championship in 2003, with a record of 51–7, including 27–2 in conference play.

In the summer of 2003, Hill was hired by Kansas State University as the head baseball coach. He replaced Mike Clark, who coached the team for 17 years. In 2004, Hill lead the Wildcats to their first-ever national ranking at No. 30 during that pan, which included an 11-game winning streak.

Then, in 2005, the Wildcats took the next step as they won 30 games in a season for just the 10th time ever, doubled their conference wins from the previous season, swept a season series from in-state rival Wichita State for the first time in 50 years and knocked off a No. 1-ranked team for the first time in school history, eventual national champion Texas.

In 2006, the Wildcats won a school-record 16 straight games and also ended the season on a 5-game winning streak, wrapping up the season with a sweep of # 22 Baylor at Tointon Family Stadium. Statistically, K-State finished the season in the top half of the league in both hitting (.314) and ERA (3.94). The 3.94 team ERA was the lowest since the 1975 season and the best since the addition of aluminum bats in college baseball.

His teams have won 40 or more games eight times and 50-plus games on four occasions.

On April 29, 2009, Hill won his 600th career game, beating North Dakota, 10–2. He also earned 2009 Big 12 Conference Baseball Coach of the Year honors.

The 2009 season proved to be the most storied in the program's 109-year history. Predicted to finish ninth in the Big 12 Baseball Preseason Poll, Hill guided K-State to a school-record 43-win season, including a program-best 14 conference victories to finish fourth in the Big 12 regular season standings, the school's best finish since placing second in the Big 8 in 1990. The Cats earned their first top 10 ranking during the season and finished the 2009 campaign in the national polls for the first time in school history when Baseball America ranked K-State No. 19 in its final poll. The Wildcats earned their first ever trip to the NCAA tournament. They won their first two games, beating Xavier University and the Rice Owls before losing two straight to the Rice Owls resulting in their elimination.

As of the 2009 Major League Baseball draft, 18 Wildcats have been drafted under the tutelage of Brad Hill.

On May 8, 2018, Brad Hill announced his resignation as head coach of Kansas State at the conclusion of the 2018 season.

== Head coaching record ==
Below is a table of Hill's yearly records as an NCAA head baseball coach. It does not include his seasons as a junior college head coach.

Record table
Season	Team	Overall	Conference	Standing	Postseason
Central Missouri State Mules (Mid-America Intercollegiate Athletics Association (DII)) (1995–2003)
1995	Central Missouri State	49–10	19–1	1st	College World Series
1996	Central Missouri State	40–12	16–2	1st	Central Regional
1997	Central Missouri State	39–13	17–2	1st	College World Series
1998	Central Missouri State	39–8	20–2	1st	College World Series
1999	Central Missouri State	43–10	20–1	1st	Central Regional
2000	Central Missouri State	50–13	29–1	1st	College World Series
2001	Central Missouri State	53–10	26–3	1st	College World Series
2002	Central Missouri State	54–8	28–3	1st	Central Regional
2003	Central Missouri State	51–7	27–2	1st	College World Series Champions
Central Missouri State:		418–91 (.821)	202–17 (.922)		
Kansas State Wildcats (Big 12 Conference) (2004–2018)
2004	Kansas State	26–30	4–23	10th	
2005	Kansas State	30–25	8–19	10th	
2006	Kansas State	31–20–2	8–17–2	9th	
2007	Kansas State	34–24	10–16	8th	
2008	Kansas State	29–29	11–16	t-6th	
2009	Kansas State	43–18–1	14–11–1	4th	NCAA Regional
2010	Kansas State	37–22	14–12	t-3rd	NCAA Regional
2011	Kansas State	36–25	12–14	6th	NCAA Regional
2012	Kansas State	27–31	7–17	t-8th	
2013	Kansas State	45–19	16–8	1st	NCAA Super Regional
2014	Kansas State	25–30	5–19	9th	
2015	Kansas State	27–30	10–14	6th	
2016	Kansas State	26–31	8–16	8th	
2017	Kansas State	29–26	8–16	9th	
2018	Kansas State	23–31	5–19	9th	
Kansas State:		462–383–3 (.547)	138–230–3 (.376)		
Emporia State Hornets (Mid-America Intercollegiate Athletics Association) (2024–present)
2024	Emporia State	21-29	11-22		
Emporia State:		21–29 (.420)	11–22 (.333)		
Total:		901–492–3 (.646)			
National champion Postseason invitational champion Conference regular season champion Conference regular season and conference tournament champion Division regular season champion Division regular season and conference tournament champion Conference tournament champion
