= 1978 NAIA World Series =

1978 NAIA baseball tournament
- 1978 NAIA World Series
- Teams: 8
- Format: Double elimination Page playoff
- Finals site: Phil Welch Stadium; St. Joseph, Missouri
- Champions: Emporia State (1st title)
- Winning coach: Dave Bingham
- MVP: Kevin Mendon (P) (Emporia State)

The 1978 NAIA World Series was the 22nd annual tournament hosted by the National Association of Intercollegiate Athletics to determine the national champion of baseball among its member colleges and universities in the United States and Canada.

After thirteen seasons (1962–1969, 1974–1978), this was the last tournament staged at Phil Welch Stadium in St. Joseph, Missouri.

Emporia State (40-20-2), emerging from the consolation bracket, defeated Missouri Southern State (24–16) in a single-game championship series, 8–6, to win the Hornets' first NAIA World Series.

Emporia State pitcher Kevin Mendon was named tournament MVP.

== Bracket ==
Upper round 1
Lewis–Clark State	5
William Carey	2
Emporia State	0
Missouri Southern State	6
David Lipscomb	5
St. Francis (IL)	1
USC Coastal Carolina	1
Point Park	3

Upper round 2
Lewis–Clark State	4
Missouri Southern State	6
David Lipscomb	11
Point Park	5
Lower round 1
St. Francis (IL)	11
USC Coastal Carolina	5
William Carey	5
Emporia State	6

Upper final
Missouri Southern State	16
David Lipscomb	5
Lower round 2
Lewis–Clark State	3
St. Francis (IL)	1
Point Park	4
Emporia State	7

Semifinals
Missouri Southern State	0
Emporia State	2
David Lipscomb	2
Lewis–Clark State	5

Preliminary final
Emporia State	4
Lewis–Clark State	1

Final
Missouri Southern State	6
Emporia State	8

== See also ==
- 1978 NCAA Division I baseball tournament
- 1978 NCAA Division II baseball tournament
- 1978 NCAA Division III baseball tournament
