= KVOE (AM) =

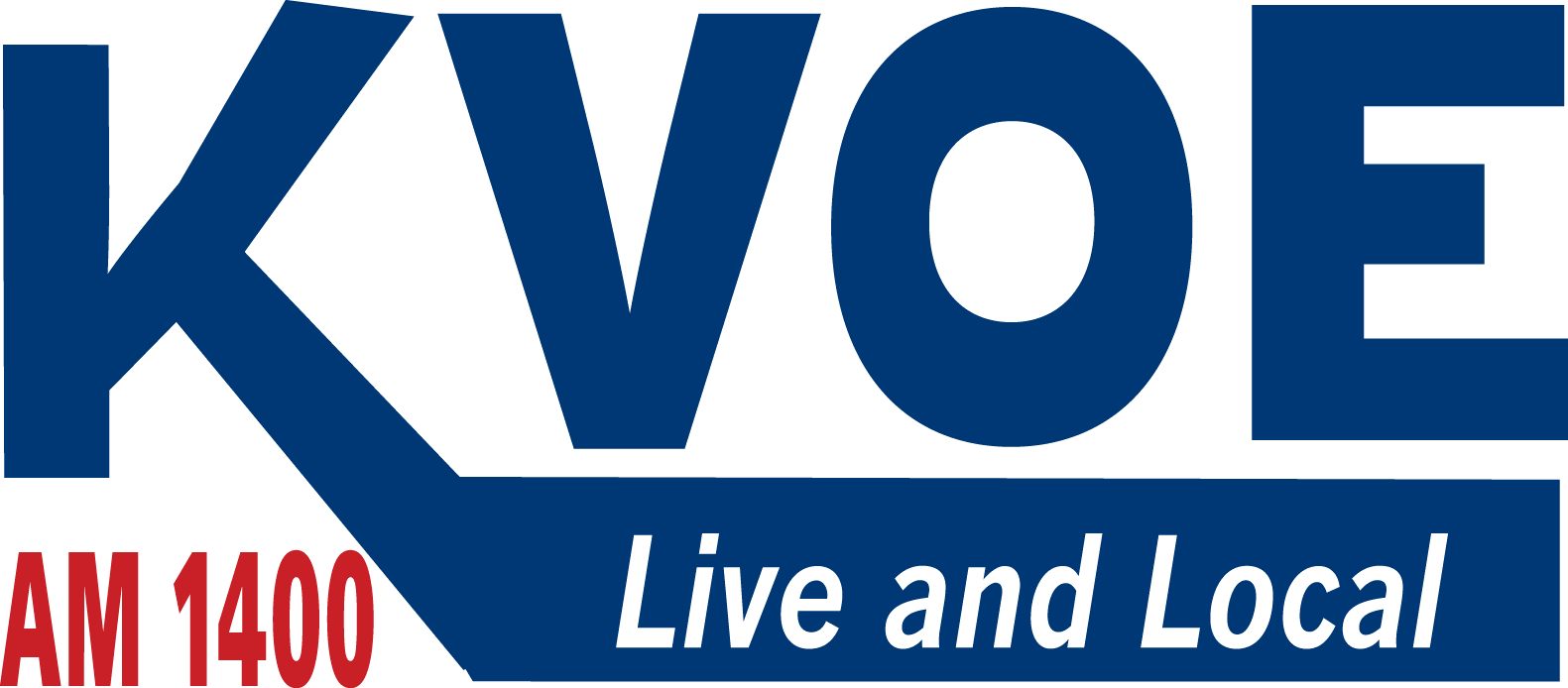

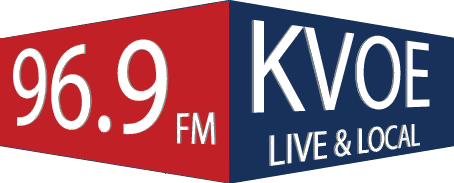
- Emporia, Kansas; United States
- Broadcast area: Lyon County, Kansas; Osage County, Kansas; Madison, Kansas; Shawnee County, Kansas; Douglas County, Kansas
- Frequency: 1400 kHz

Programming
- Format: News/talk/sports; adult contemporary music

Ownership
- Owner: Emporia's Radio Stations, Inc.
- Sister stations: KVOE-FM; KFFX

History
- First air date: 1939
- Former call signs: KTSW (1939–1956)
- Call sign meaning: Kansas' Voice of Emporia

Technical information
- Facility ID: 69777
- Class: C
- Power: 1 kW
- Transmitter coordinates: 38°23′10.1″N 96°10′37″W
- Translator: 96.9 K245BQ (Emporia)

Links
- Website: www.kvoe.com

KVOE (1400 AM) is an area news, talk, and sports radio station that airs local programming such as Talk of Emporia, The Chat, and Area Coach's Corner in Emporia, Kansas. KVOE also carries national programs such as ABC News Radio. KVOE is licensed to Emporia, Kansas, and owned by Emporia's Radio Stations, Inc.

== History ==
KVOE AM was established in 1939 under the call sign "KTSW" broadcasting out of the Broadview Hotel at 6th and Merchant. The call letters stood for the names of its founders Kermit Trimble and Selleck Warren. KTSW initially broadcast on 1370 kHz with 100 watts of power. Under the North American Regional Broadcasting Agreement, KTSW would change frequency to 1400 kHz on March 29, 1941 and increase power to 250 watts. By early 1951 the station had moved out of the Broadview to a new location near the south city limits of Emporia. In 1956, KTSW saw a change in ownership and a call sign change to KVOE to reflect "Kansas' Voice of Emporia". Since 1952 KVOE has been the only radio station in Emporia that provides live news updates.

KVOE became a Keystone affiliate in the 1950s with Bluestem Broadcasting acquiring ownership in 1957. In March 1965 the Federal Communications Commission authorized KVOE to increase its daytime power to 1,000 watts, broadening its coverage area. By the 1970s, KVOE was listed as an ABC affiliate, with easy listening/middle of the road music, and some country programming. The license transferred to Valu Broadcasting in 1987 after which the station altered its music programming to mostly adult contemporary with some oldies. KVOE signed on an FM translator at 96.9 MHz in the fall of 2014.

== Awards ==
KVOE has won numerous awards from the Kansas Association of Broadcasters. In 2011, KVOE won KAB's Website of the Year. In 2010, KVOE won the KAB's Tony Jewell Community Service Award. On April 17, 2012, KVOE's general manager Ron Thomas, went to Las Vegas, Nevada to accept the Crystal Radio Award from the National Association of Broadcasters, one of which 10 out of 50 radio stations are awarded.

== Community service ==
Every year, KVOE puts on a Drive for Food campaign in partnership with the Salvation Army collecting "non-perishable food items" for their food pantry. KVOE also hosts an auction over the radio for the National Teachers Hall of Fame. In 2014, KVOE partnered with Emporia State University to help defeat the school's rival, Washburn University.
