= Robert E. Glennen =

American education administrator (1933–2015)

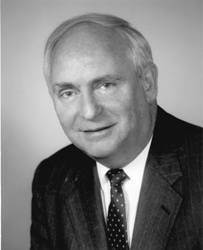

13th President of Emporia State University
- In office July 1, 1984 – July 31, 1997
- Preceded by: John E. Visser
- Succeeded by: Kay Schallenkamp

10th President of Western New Mexico University
- In office 1980–1984
- Preceded by: John Snedeker
- Succeeded by: Mervyn Cadwallader

Personal details
- Born: Robert Eugene Glennen Jr. March 31, 1933 Omaha, Nebraska
- Died: December 1, 2015 (aged 82) Las Vegas, Nevada
- Spouse: Mary O'Brien
- Education: University of Portland (B.A; M.S); University of Notre Dame (PhD)
- Profession: Educator

Robert Eugene Glennen Jr. (March 31, 1933 – December 1, 2015) was an American education administrator, who served as Emporia State University's thirteenth president in Emporia, Kansas. Before becoming president of Emporia State, Glennen also served as the tenth president at Western New Mexico University, and held various administrative jobs at the University of Nevada, Las Vegas, and the University of Notre Dame.

== Education ==
Glennen received his bachelor of arts and master's degree from the University of Portland, and his doctorate from the University of Notre Dame in 1962.

== Career ==
=== 1960s and '70s ===
After graduating from Notre Dame in 1962, Glennen was the associate dean at Notre Dame for 10 years. Following that, he became the UNLV vice-president and dean of the university's college. At both Notre Dame and UNLV, his job was to create new programs for undecided freshman students.

=== Presidencies ===
In 1980, after being at UNLV for eight years, Glennen moved to Silver City, New Mexico, to become the tenth president of Western New Mexico University. He served as the president from 1980 to 1984. In 1984, Glennen became Emporia State University's next president.

==== Emporia State University ====
When Glennen arrived at Emporia State in July 1984, many issues were happening involving budget cuts, an enrollment decline, and even the possibility of closing the institution. One of his most successful achievements during his administration was the establishment of the National Teachers Hall of Fame, a non-profit organization that honors exceptional school teachers throughout the United States. On July 31, 1997, Glennen retired as president and took a year off, before returning as a faculty member in The Teachers College in the division of counselor education and rehabilitation programs in 1998 for one year. He officially retired from teaching after the 1998–99 school year.
