= Emporia State University =

Public university in Emporia, Kansas, US

- Former names: Kansas State Normal School (1863–1923); Kansas State Teachers College (1923–1974); Emporia Kansas State College (1974–1977)
- Motto: "Changing Lives for the Common Good"
- Type: Public university
- Established: March 7, 1863; 163 years ago
- Parent institution: Kansas Board of Regents
- Accreditation: HLC
- Academic affiliations: Space-grant
- Endowment: $100.7 million (2021)
- Budget: $91.82 million (2017)
- President: Matt Baker
- Provost: Brent Thomas
- Academic staff: 237 Full-time and 37 Part-time (Spring 2022)
- Administrative staff: 207
- Students: 4,557 (fall 2024)
- Location: Emporia, Kansas, United States; 38°24′58″N 96°10′47″W
- Campus: 234 acres (0.95 km^{2}); Remote town
- Other campuses: Overland Park
- Newspaper: ESU Bulletin
- Colors: Black and gold
- Nickname: Hornets
- Sporting affiliations: NCAA Division II – The MIAA
- Mascot: Corky the Hornet
- Website: emporia.edu

Emporia State University (Emporia State or ESU) is a public university in Emporia, Kansas, United States. Established in March 1863 as the Kansas State Normal School, Emporia State is the third-oldest public university in the state of Kansas. Emporia State is one of six public universities governed by the Kansas Board of Regents.

The university offers degrees through seven schools, one college, and one institute: the School of Business and Technology, School of Humanities and Social Sciences, School of Library and Information Management, School of Science and Mathematics, School of Visual and Performing Arts, School of Applied Health Sciences, The Teachers College, and the Institute of Interdisciplinary Studies. Prior to the 2023–24 school year, Emporia State only had two schools and colleges.

== History ==
=== Early history ===
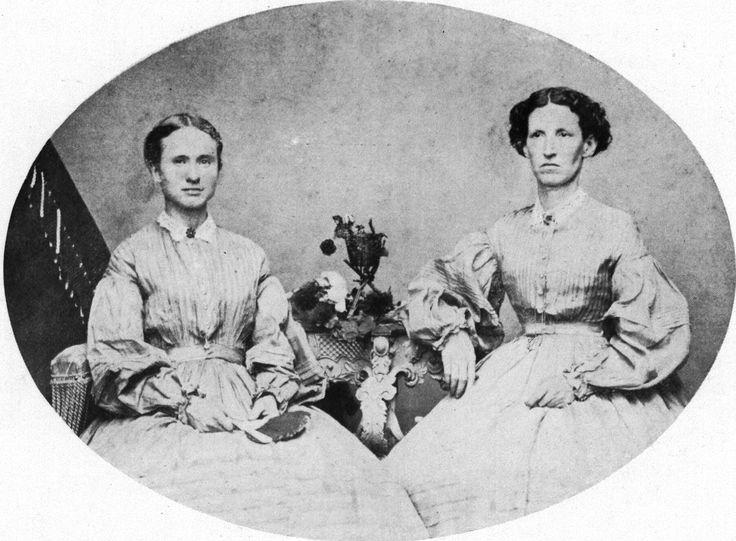
Ellen Plumb, right, and Mary J. Watson, left, the first graduating class of the Kansas State Normal School in 1867

The origins of the university date back to 1861, when Kansas became a state. The Kansas Constitution provided for a state university, and from 1861 to 1863 the question of where the university would be located—Lawrence, Manhattan or Emporia—was debated. In February 1863, Manhattan was selected as the site for the state's land-grant college, authorized by the 1862 Morrill Land-Grant Act–what evolved into Kansas State University. Lawrence and Emporia were therefore left as the only candidates for a state university. The fact that Amos Adams Lawrence had donated $10,000 (plus interest), as well as 40 acres (160,000 m^{2}) to the city of Lawrence had great weight with the Kansas Legislature, and Lawrence was selected by one vote over Emporia as the location of the University of Kansas. On March 7, 1863, the Kansas Legislature passed the enabling act to establish the Kansas State Normal School, which would one day become Emporia State University; it did not open until February 15, 1865. The first class graduated two and a half years later; it consisted of two women, Mary Jane Watson and Ellen Plumb. Ellen was the sister of US Senator Preston B. Plumb.

In 1876, the Kansas Legislature passed the "Miscellaneous appropriations bill of 1876". As a result, Leavenworth Normal and Concordia Normal were closed so the state funding for normal schools could be directed to Emporia. Then, in the early 20th century, KSN branched out with satellited campuses in Pittsburg and Hays. The Hays campus opened June 3, 1902 as KSN's "Western Branch." It became an autonomous college in 1914 as Fort Hays Kansas State Normal School, and has since developed into Fort Hays State University. The Pittsburg branch was opened as the Manual Training Auxiliary School in 1904; it became a four-year school named Kansas State Teachers College of Pittsburg in 1913. Today it is Pittsburg State University.

In February 1923, the name of the school was changed to the Kansas State Teachers College. In July 1974, the name was changed to Emporia Kansas State College. On April 21, 1977, the college became Emporia State University.

=== Present university ===
In June 2022, Ken Hush became the 18th president of Emporia State. Hush. He was previously President and Executive Officer at Koch Minerals and Carbon, an affiliate of Koch Industries. He was selected by a search committee consisting of students, faculty, staff, alumni, and other accomplished professionals representing a broad range of interests.

As with other universities, changes in student demand for majors and programs have not occurred uniformly across the various entities at ESU. In September 2022, the Kansas Board of Regents approved a plan by the Hush administration to downsize 7% of ESU's employees, including tenured professors for "current or future market considerations".

Following the downsizing, in 2024 the university obtained Regents' approval for a "net decrease in tuition and fees". Programmatic and other changes announced in 2024 include the following: (1) groundbreaking for a new building for Nursing and Student wellness, which is expected to open in fall 2025; (2) a "Jump Start/Concurrent Enrollment" program for high school students in nearby counties; (3) articulation agreements with 19 Kansas community colleges that will provide "seamless transfer of courses in nursing, education, criminology and the sciences"; (4) an "articulation agreement in which undergraduates at ESU can shorten the time to complete their bachelor's and law degrees by taking law classes at Washburn University's Law School during their senior year"; and (5) a partnership with Pittsburg State University providing "course sharing opportunities."

One of the faculty cut oversaw ESU's debate team, competing on behalf of the university since 1874, predating the university's football team. Despite the small size of ESU, the debate team has competed–and won–against several schools, including the Ivy Leagues. In the 2012–2013 academic year, alumni Elijah Smith and Ryan Wash helped ESU make debate history as the first university to "unite the crowns" and win the CEDA and National Debate Tournament championships in the same year. The debate program ended in May 2023.

The American Association of University Professors published an investigative report in May 2023 concerning the termination of thirty tenured and tenure-track faculty appointments at the university and placed it on its list of censured institutions. The investigating committee found that, in carrying out the terminations, the ESU administration and the Kansas Board of Regents disregarded AAUP-recommended principles and procedural standards concerning tenure and academic freedom. It also found that the board’s reactivation in May 2022 of a temporary COVID-19-related policy allowed system institutions to abrogate existing university regulations that did comport in most essential respects with AAUP-supported standards. The temporary policy suspended existing university regulations and gave the ESU administration the authority to "suspend, dismiss, or terminate" any professor, tenured or untenured, without involving faculty governance bodies and without affording academic due process to the affected faculty members. Although the board of regents offered the policy to all system institutions, only Emporia State's administration adopted it–in September 2022, just three months before it was set to expire.

In August 2023, Emporia State became the only Kansas public university without campus child care when it closed its Center for Early Childhood Education in the midst of a national child care crisis. In Lyon County, there are between 21-30 children per opening at a child care facility as of 2021, according to Child Care Aware of Kansas.

Enrollment dropped at ESU in September 2023, most notably in the College of Education. Previously, the College of Education had a reputation for quality. A comprehensive evaluation of schools or colleges of education by Arthur Levine (Emeritus President of Columbia University's Teacher College) reported Emporia State as having "an exemplary teacher education program."

Hush announced his retirement in July 2025, with his last day being December 17, 2025. In December 2025, the university announced Hush was donating back his presidential salary from the last three years. Matt Baker, vice president of student affairs at Northwest Missouri State University, was announced as the 19th president of Emporia State on December 11 and began on March 2, 2026.

== Academic organization ==
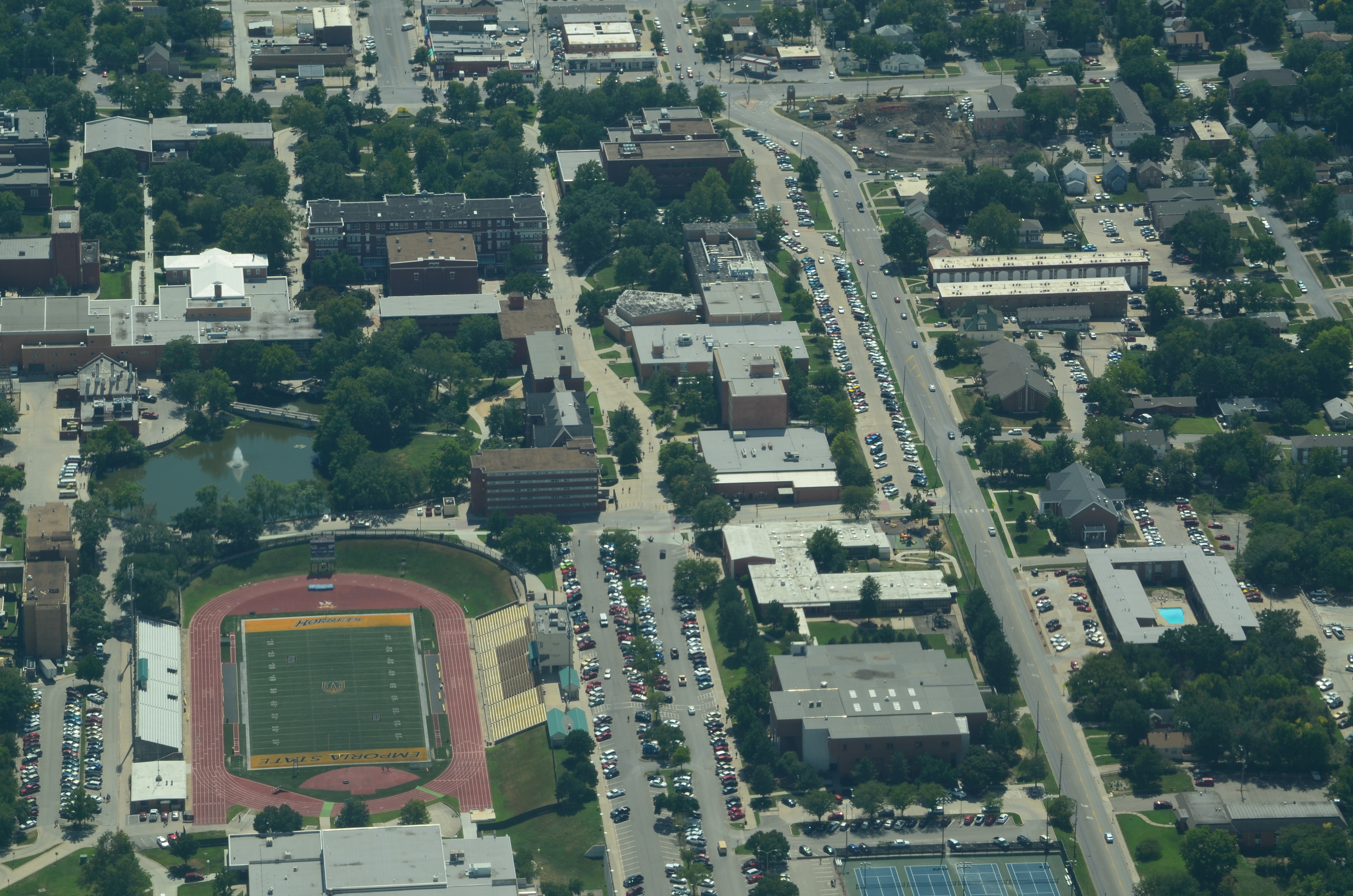
Aerial view of Emporia State University

By enrollment, Emporia State is the seventh-largest university in Kansas. In the fall 2014 semester, it set a record enrollment with 6,114 students.

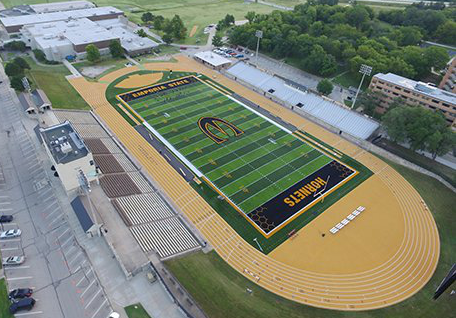
Welch Stadium, 2016

Emporia State University comprises seven schools, one college, and one institute: the School of Business and Technology, School of Humanities and Social Sciences, School of Library and Information Management, School of Science and Mathematics, School of Visual and Performing Arts, School of Applied Health Sciences, The Teachers College, and the Institute of Interdisciplinary Studies. Prior to the 2023–24 school year, Emporia State only had two schools and colleges.

Emporia State is accredited by the Higher Learning Commission. The university offers degrees in more than 80 courses of study. Emporia State has a satellite campus in Kansas City, which is mostly online classes, but some classes are held in the building.

=== School of Business and Technology ===
Founded in 1868, the School of Business is located on the main campus. It has more than 30 faculty members and approximately 300 students.

The School is accredited by the Association to Advance Collegiate Schools of Business (AACSB International). The programs have been thoroughly reviewed and found to be of the highest quality. This distinction is found with less than 5% of business schools worldwide.

The School was renamed to the School of Business and Technology in 2023, after a university-wide restructure.

==== Koch Center for Leadership and Ethics ====
The School of Business opened the Koch Center for Leadership and Ethics, which is a center made up of classes that focuses on entrepreneurial management. The center was funded through grants of $750,000 from the Fred Koch Foundation, as well as Koch Industries. The university has since disbanded this center.

=== School of Library and Information Management and Archives ===
The School of Library and Information Management (SLIM), which was founded in 1902, is the "oldest school of library and information studies in the western half of the United States." SLIM is the only accredited American Library Association program in Kansas, and the School Library Media Licensure program is also accredited by the National Council for Accreditation of Teacher Education (NCATE). The School of Library and Information Management also offers Emporia State University's only PhD: a doctorate in Library and Information Management.

As part of a university-wide restructure in 2023, SLIM added instructional design & technology to its school, joining the University Libraries and Archives that merged with the school in 2021.

=== School of Humanities and Social Sciences ===
As part of a university-wide restructure in 2023, the School of Humanities and Social Sciences was created from some departments in the College of Liberal Arts and Sciences: English and modern languages, communication, social sciences, sociology and criminology and the Intensive English Program.

=== School of Science and Mathematics ===
As part of a university-wide restructure in 2023, the School of Science and Mathematics was created from departments in College of Liberal Arts and Sciences, and includes biological sciences, mathematics, physics, Earth science, chemistry and forensic science.

=== School of Visual and Performing Arts ===
As part of a university-wide restructure in 2023, the School of Visual and Performing Arts was created from departments in College of Liberal Arts and Sciences, and includes music, theatre and art.

=== School of Applied Health Sciences ===
As part of a university-wide restructure in 2023, the School of Applied Health Sciences was created from departments in College of Liberal Arts and Sciences, and includes psychology, counseling, nursing, and health, physical education, and recreation.

=== Institute of Interdisciplinary Studies ===
As part of a university-wide restructure in 2023, the Institute of Interdisciplinary Studies was created from the department of interdisciplinary studies in the College of Liberal Arts and Sciences, and includes interdisciplinary studies and ethnic, gender and identity studies.

=== The Teachers College ===
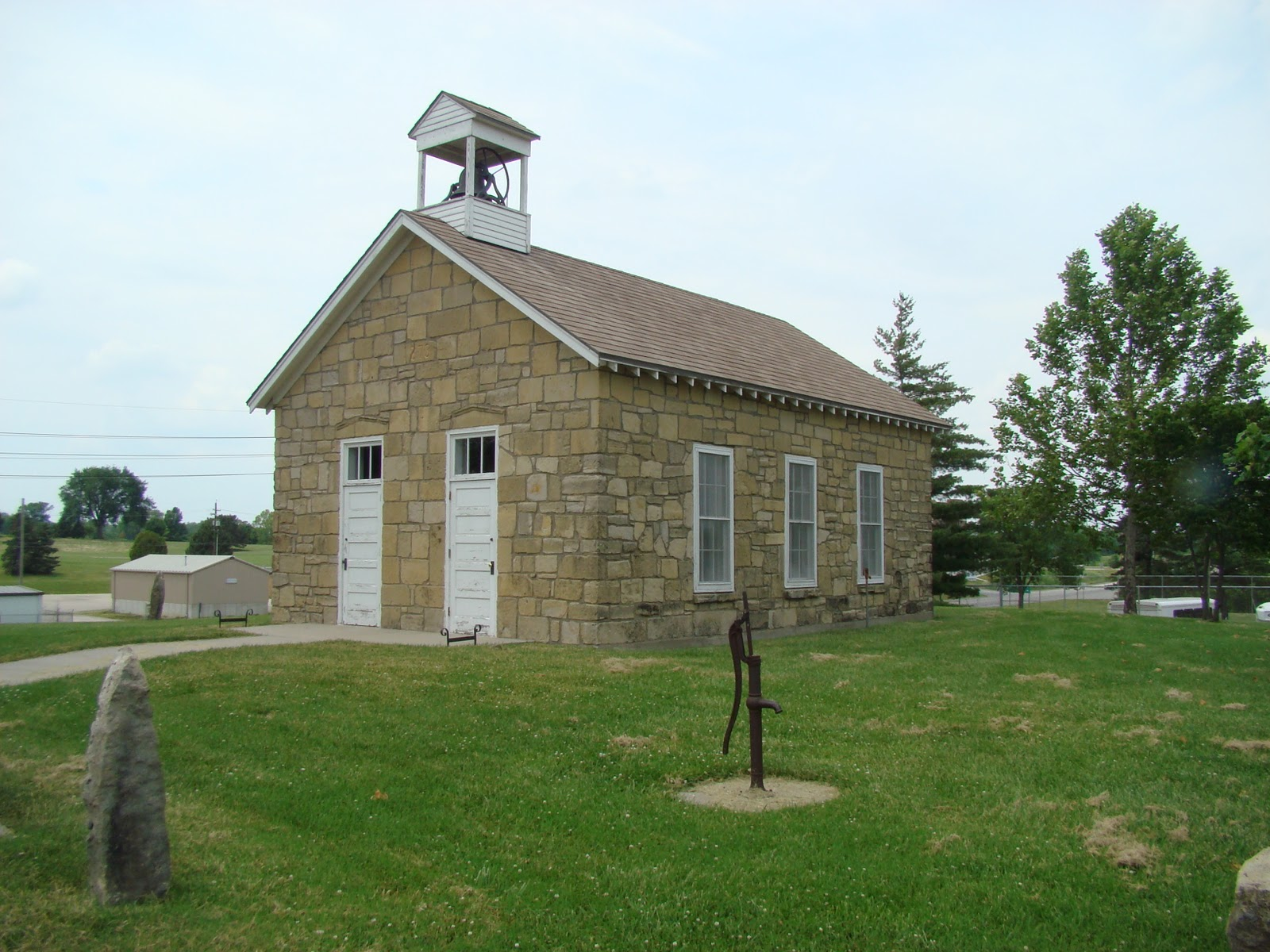
The one-room schoolhouse on the Emporia State University campus

The Teachers College at Emporia State University is an "Exemplary Model Teacher Education" program as named by Arthur Levine in 2006. In 2011, The Teachers College was featured in a video produced by the U.S. Department of Education highlighting the use of professional development schools.

==== Jones Institute for Educational Excellence ====
The Jones Institute for Educational Excellence is a non-profit organization provided by the Jones Trust in Lyon County. In August 1982, the office was established as part of the Teachers College for research to better education in the state of Kansas.

==== National Teachers Hall of Fame ====
The National Teachers Hall of Fame (NTHF) is a non-profit organization that honors exceptional school teachers and was established in 1989 by Emporia State University, the City of Emporia, the local school district, and the Chamber of Commerce. The NTHF has a museum on Emporia State's campus that honors the inducted teachers. It also has a teacher resource center and a program which recognizes five of the nation's best educators each June.

The Hall of Fame annually honors five teachers who have demonstrated commitment and dedication to teaching children. The first induction was held in June 1992, and, 115 teachers have since been inducted into the Hall of Fame. Inductees cover more than three-quarters of the United States and Washington D.C.

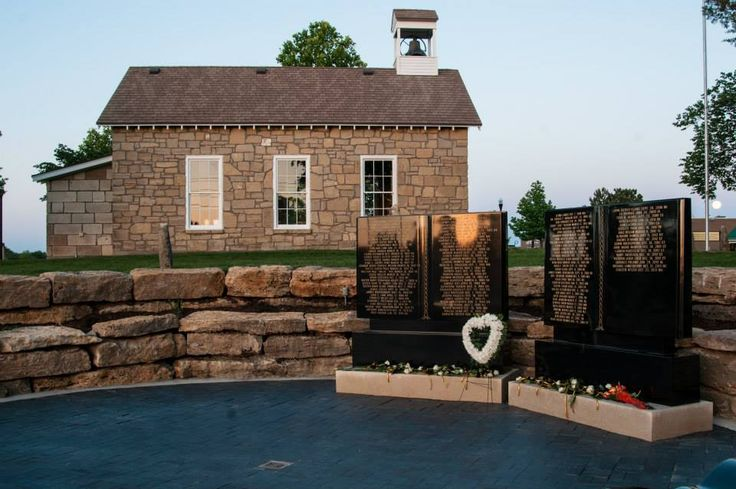
Memorial for Fallen Educators with the one-room schoolhouse in the background

===== Memorial for Fallen Educators =====
On June 13, 2013, the NTHF executive director, along with former university officials, U.S. Sen. Jerry Moran's staff, and local government leaders broke ground by the one-room schoolhouse located on the campus to build a memorial for teachers who have fallen in the "line of duty". The Sandy Hook Elementary School shooting was the main inspiration for the memorial. On June 6, 2014, the granite memorial markers were placed along with granite benches. The official dedication was held on June 12, 2014.

On September 21, 2015, United States Senator Moran of Kansas introduced a bill to the United States Congress to designate the memorial as the "National Memorial to Fallen Educators". Should the bill pass by both the U.S. House of Representatives and Senate, the memorial would then need to be signed by the President of the United States. The memorial would not become a part of the National Park Service, nor would it receive Federal funding.

=== Kansas City campus ===
Emporia State University–Kansas City is the branch campus of Emporia State, located in Overland Park. The campus offers both undergraduate and graduate degrees.

=== Honors College ===
On August 29, 2014, Emporia State announced that it had received $1 million additional funding from the Governor's office for the school's first-ever Honors College.

== Campus ==
=== Academic buildings ===
Most academic buildings at Emporia State University are dedicated to someone or are an important part of the school's history.

Beach Music Hall, named in honor of former professor Frank A. Beach, houses the Music Department. It was built in 1926, and contains classrooms, a recital hall, and practice studios.

Within the science building, Bruekelman Science Hall houses the Biological Sciences department and mathematics and economics departments, while Cram Science Hall houses the Physical Sciences department and classrooms for chemistry, physics, and earth science. Inside the science building are two museums – Johnston Geology Museum and the Richard H. Schmidt Museum of Natural History, along with the Peterson Planetarium.

Cremer Hall contains the School of Business and technology. The building opened in 1964 and is also home to the Kansas Business Hall of Fame.

The HPER Building, officially known as the Health, Physical Education and Recreation building, is home to the Athletics and physical education department. Inside the building are five gyms, locker rooms, classrooms, administrative offices, and a swimming pool.

Inside John E. King Hall, named after the 11th president of ESU, are the Theatre Department, and the Arts and Communication Departments. Also inside is the Karl C. Bruder Theatre.

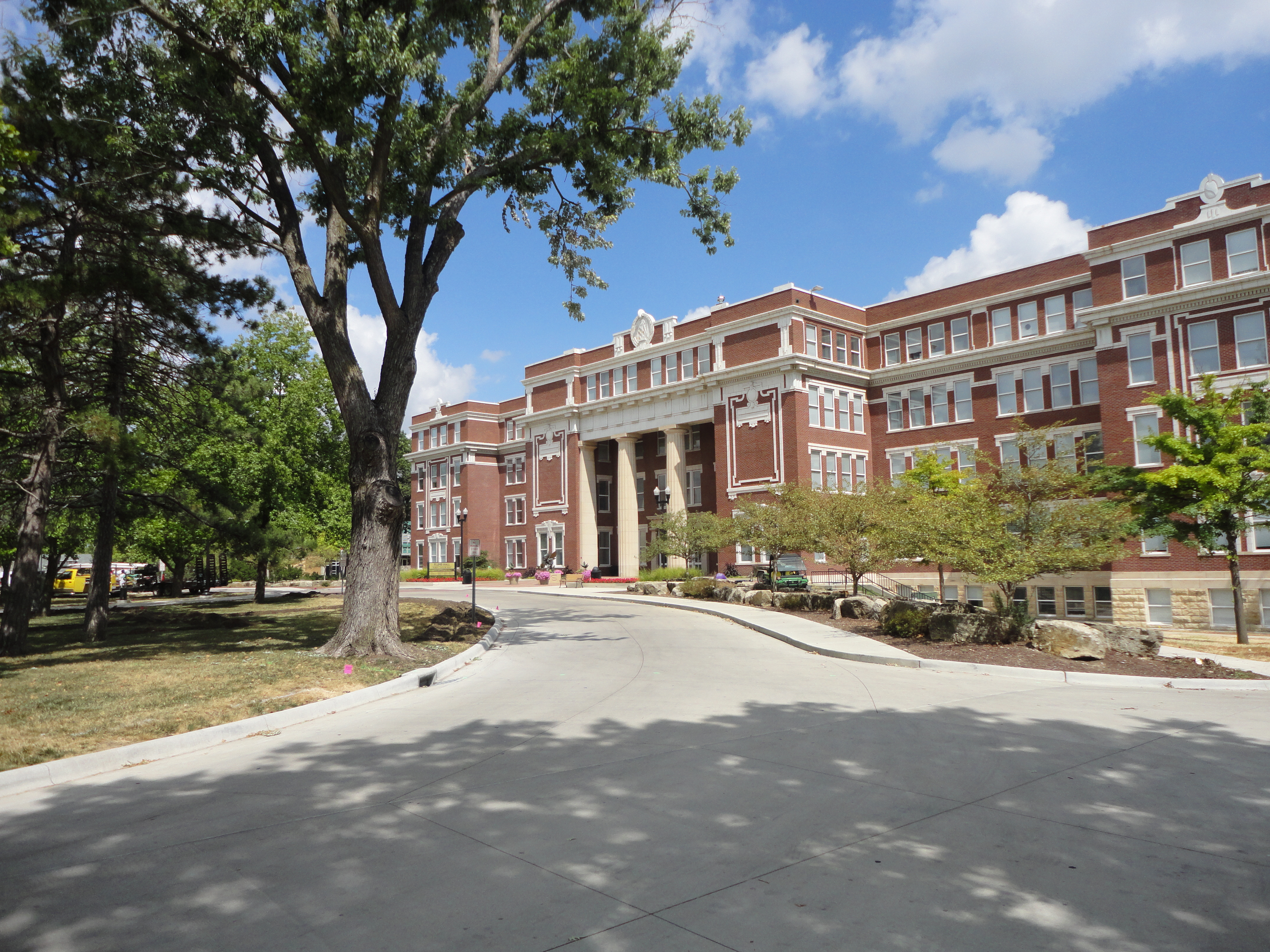
Preston B. Plumb Hall

Plumb Hall serves as the administration building, and houses President's office, Academic Affairs, Fiscal Affairs, Financial Aid services, Human Resources, some classrooms, Social Sciences and English departments, and the Graduate School. The building is named after Senator Preston B. Plumb. Also inside is Albert Taylor Hall, an auditorium named after the 5th president of ESU.

Roosevelt Hall, previously a high school in Emporia, once served as the home of the College of Liberal Arts & Sciences dean's office. Inside are classrooms primarily for English, Modern Languages, and Journalism classes, as well as a theatre.

John E. Visser Hall, named after ESU's 12th president, is home to the Teachers College. It also houses the Teachers Hall of Fame.

The William Allen White Library is home to the School of Library and Information Management and Archives. Inside are a computer lab, the University Archives, and the Academic Center for Excellence and Success.

=== Other buildings ===
The Emporia State University Memorial Union is the student activity center. It opened on Founder's Day in 1925 as a memorial to the KSN students who died in World War I. It was the first student union west of the Mississippi River. Inside the Union are the bookstore, admissions office, Sodexo dining services, and student life offices, and the office for the vice president of enrollment management and success.

The Sauder Alumni Center houses the Emporia State University Foundation and Alumni Association. Cora Miller Hall houses the School of Nursing, and is located next to Newman Regional Hospital.

== Student life ==
Undergraduate demographics as of Fall 2023
| Race and ethnicity | Total |
|---|---|
| White | 71% |
| Hispanic | 13% |
| Two or more races | 6% |
| Black | 4% |
| International student | 3% |
| Unknown | 2% |
| Asian | 1% |
Economic diversity
| Low-income (Note: The percentage of students who received an income-based federal Pell grant intended for low-income students.) | 35% |
| Affluent (Note: The percentage of students who are a part of the American middle class at the bare minimum.) | 65% |

=== Housing ===
At ESU, all incoming freshmen students must live in the Towers Complex (North & South Towers, Singular, and Trusler), unless they already live within a 30-mile (48 km) radius of the campus. Upperclassmen have the choice to live in Abigail Morse Hall, the original dormitory on campus.

South Morse Hall, which used to house students, is now used for office purposes such as the TRIO Program and Student Wellness Center are located in South.

The Towers Complex is made up into four residence halls: North and South Towers, and Singular and Trusler Towers. Trusler went under renovation in the fall of 2013, with Singular going under renovation in the spring of 2014.

In November 2017, construction started on a new residence hall, Schallenkamp Hall, which was named after Emporia State's 14th president, Kay Schallenkamp. It opened in 2020 and is the first new building on campus since 2000.

=== Fraternity and sorority life ===
ESU has eight fraternities and six sororities.

Emporia State fraternity and sorority life
| Fraternities | Sororities |
| Phi Delta Theta; Sigma Phi Epsilon; Sigma Tau Gamma | Alpha Sigma Alpha; Chi Omega; Sigma Sigma Sigma; Panhellenic Association |

=== Student newspaper ===
The school newspaper of Emporia State University is ESU Bulletin, established in 1901. It is published once a week on Thursdays, and is distributed free of charge in all campus buildings. Supported by student fees and advertising, The Bulletin is written and operated by student staff members.

=== Student yearbook ===
Sunflower, the university's yearbook, is published each spring as a chronicle of the year's events and activities. It is funded by student fees and distributed during finals week of the spring semester. Students who choose to be included in the yearbook are photographed at no charge during the fall semester.

== Athletics ==
| Men's sports | Women's sports |
|---|---|
| Baseball | Basketball |
| Basketball | Cross country |
| Cross country | Disc golf |
| Disc golf | Soccer |
| Football | Softball |
| Tennis | Tennis |
| Track and field^{†} | Track and field^{†} |
| | Volleyball |
† – Track and field includes both indoor and outdoor

ESU's official athletics logo

The Emporia State athletic teams are called the Hornets (with women's basketball and softball being called the Lady Hornets). The university is a member of the NCAA Division II ranks, primarily competing in the Mid-America Intercollegiate Athletics Association (The MIAA) since the 1991–92 academic year. The Hornets previously competed as an NCAA D-II Independent from 1989–90 to 1990–91; in the Central States Intercollegiate Conference (CSIC) of the National Association of Intercollegiate Athletics (NAIA) from 1976–77 to 1988–89; in the Great Plains Athletic Conference (GPAC) from 1972–73 to 1975–76; in the Rocky Mountain Athletic Conference (RMAC) from 1968–69 to 1971–72; in the Central Intercollegiate Athletic Conference (CIC) from 1923–24 to 1967–68; and in the Kansas Collegiate Athletic Conference (KCAC) from 1902–03 to 1922–23.

Emporia State competes in 16 intercollegiate varsity sports: Men's sports include baseball, basketball, cross country, disc golf, football, tennis and track & field (indoor and outdoor); while women's sports include basketball, cross country, disc golf, soccer, softball, tennis, track & field (indoor and outdoor) and volleyball.

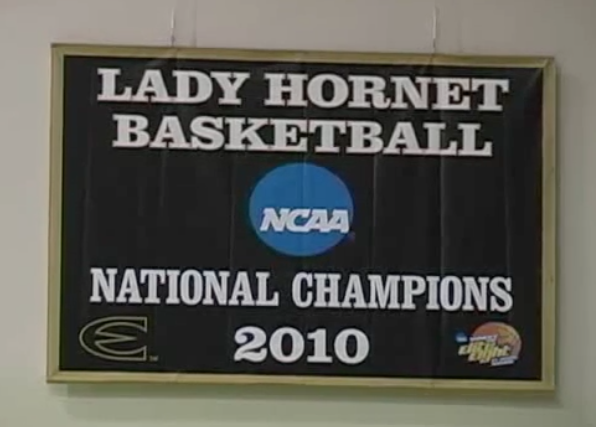
2010 National Championship banner hanging in White Auditorium

=== Basketball ===
Of its varsity sports, only Emporia States' women's basketball team has claimed a national title for the school. The Lady Hornets, led by former head coach Brandon Schneider, won the 2010 NCAA Division II Women's Basketball Championship, defeating the Fort Lewis College Skyhawks. They are coached by Brian Ostermann. The men's basketball team is coached by Craig Doty, a three-time national championship coach.

=== Football ===
The Hornets football team is currently coached by former Hornets quarterback Garin Higgins. Since joining the MIAA in 1991, the Hornets have gone 123–118 in conference play. The Hornets have also participated in five post-season bowls, winning three.

=== Baseball ===
The Hornets baseball team played its first game in 1949. The team has four conference championships, three conference tournament champions, and two College World Series appearances, with a 2009 runner-up coached by ESU alum, Bob Fornelli. The team also made five appearances in the NAIA World Series, winning the 1978 World Series. Currently the team is coached by former Hornet, Brad Hill.

=== Softball ===
The Hornets softball team played its first game by 1971, seven years before the baseball team. The team is currently coached by April Rosales, who took over the program on October 19, 2015. The softball team appeared in three Women's College World Series, in 1971, 1972, and 1979, and also won the first AIAW Division II national championship in 1980. Emporia State also played for the national championship in 2006 and 2008.

=== Facilities ===
Since 1940, home basketball games have been played at William L. White Auditorium, a 5,000-seat arena named after William Lindsay White, son of William Allen White. In addition to serving as home to the men's and women's basketball teams, the arena is used by the Lady Hornets volleyball team. In 2008, the auditorium received an upgrade throughout the entire building.

Francis G. Welch Stadium serves as home to the Hornets football team. The stadium, named after long-time Emporia State football coach and athletic director Fran Welch, opened in 1947 and has since undergone a few renovations. In 1994, the east and west side concession areas, restroom facilities, and entrances were renovated, a new scoreboard was hoisted into place at the south end of the stadium, and a new landscaped fence was erected. The Hutchinson Family Pavilion, a three-tiered facility which has enclosed theatre seating on the first floor, a president's box and four sky-boxes on the second floor, and a game-day management and media center on the third floor, was built in 1997. The current seating capacity is 7,000. In 2005, an artificial football field was placed down, with that one being replaced in 2016, as well as a new track.

Trusler Sports Complex is home to the baseball and softball teams. The baseball team competes on Glennen Field, named after Robert E. Glennen, 13th president of Emporia State. In 2009, the field was renovated with a new artificial turf that replaced the infield. The Lady Hornets compete on Turnbull Field named after J. Michael Turnbull, a trustee of the Trusler Foundation.

=== School colors ===
| Black | Gold |

Emporia State's official school colors are black and gold. These have been the colors since the school was founded in 1863. Until recently, the gold was "old gold".

=== Mascot ===
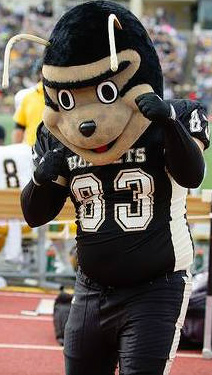
Corky the Hornet at an Emporia State football game

In 1923, the teams were known as the "Yaps", but it was not a popular name. Men's basketball coach Vic Trusler recommended to a reporter of the Emporia Gazette that the name should be changed to "Yellow Jackets". Due to the lack of newspaper space, the reporter changed it to "Hornets".

In 1933, the Teachers College held a contest in which students and staff could design a mascot for the college. Sophomore Paul Edwards, who graduated in 1937, designed Corky. Although hundreds of drawings were submitted, Edwards' Corky, a "human-like" hornet, was selected and published in The Bulletin, the student newspaper for Emporia State University.

== Foundation ==
Established in 1952, the Emporia State University Foundation is an independent, nonprofit corporation that helps support Emporia State by fundraising.

=== Campaign ===
In February 2013, when the university turned 150, it announced a campaign to raise $45 million in five to seven years. The campaign's slogan is "Silent no more." After the announcement of a donation, big or small, the university rings a bell called Silent Joe. The bell, which is located just south of Francis G. Welch Stadium, was originally rung only after a football team won at home. The campaign ended in February 2017, having raised $58.03 million, the largest in the university's history.

== Police and Safety ==
ESU Police and Safety is the campus police department. Besides enforcing the law, the department also provides other assistance for the students and faculty/staff members such as escorts and vehicle problems. The department has ten full-time commissioned officers (one chief, one lieutenant, three sergeants, two corporals, and three officers), one full-time dispatcher, and several student dispatchers. The Kansas Highway Patrol also has an office in the building.

== See also ==
- College of Emporia – a defunct private college in Emporia from 1882 to 1974
