= List of colleges and universities in Kansas =

The following is a list of colleges and universities in the U.S. state of Kansas.

The Kansas Board of Regents governs six state universities and supervises and coordinates 19 community colleges, five technical colleges, six technical schools and a municipal university. The Board also authorizes private and out-of-state institutions to operate in Kansas with a Certificate of Approval renewed annually. These schools offer instruction for business trade, technical, or industrial occupations leading to a certificate, diploma, or academic degree.

== Public colleges and universities ==
Map of public colleges and universities in Kansas offering four-year degrees:
– Public universities
– Municipal universities
– Federal universities

=== State universities ===
- Emporia State University (ESU)
- Fort Hays State University (FHSU)
- Kansas State University (KSU)
- Pittsburg State University (PSU)
- University of Kansas (KU)
- Wichita State University (WSU)

=== Municipal universities ===
- Washburn University

=== Federal or Military colleges and universities ===
- Haskell Indian Nations University
- United States Army Command and General Staff College

=== Community colleges ===
- Allen Community College
- Barton Community College
- Butler Community College
- Cloud County Community College
- Coffeyville Community College
- Colby Community College
- Cowley Community College
- Dodge City Community College
- Fort Scott Community College
- Garden City Community College
- Highland Community College
- Hutchinson Community College
- Independence Community College
- Johnson County Community College
- Kansas City Kansas Community College
- Labette Community College
- Neosho County Community College
- Pratt Community College
- Seward County Community College

=== Technical colleges and schools ===
- Flint Hills Technical College
- Fort Hays Tech North Central
- Fort Hays Tech Northwest
- Manhattan Area Technical College
- Salina Area Technical College
- Washburn Institute of Technology
- Wichita Technical Institute
- WSU Tech

== Private colleges and universities ==
Map of private colleges and universities in Kansas offering four-year degrees

There are many schools not on this list that have operations in Kansas but do not have their main campus in the state (such as Arkansas State University).

- Baker University
- Barclay College
- Benedictine College
- Bethany College
- Bethel College
- Central Christian College
- Cleveland University-Kansas City
- Donnelly College
- Friends University
- Hesston College
- Kansas Christian College
- Kansas Health Science University–Kansas College of Osteopathic Medicine
- Kansas Wesleyan University
- Manhattan Christian College
- McPherson College
- MidAmerica Nazarene University
- Newman University (Kansas)
- Ottawa University
- Saint Mary's Academy and College
- Saint Paul School of Theology
- Southwestern College
- Sterling College
- Tabor College
- University of Saint Mary

== See also ==
- List of college athletic programs in Kansas
- List of defunct colleges and universities in Kansas
- List of high schools in Kansas
- Higher education in the United States
- Lists of American institutions of higher education
- List of recognized higher education accreditation organizations
