= Andy Tompkins =

American educator

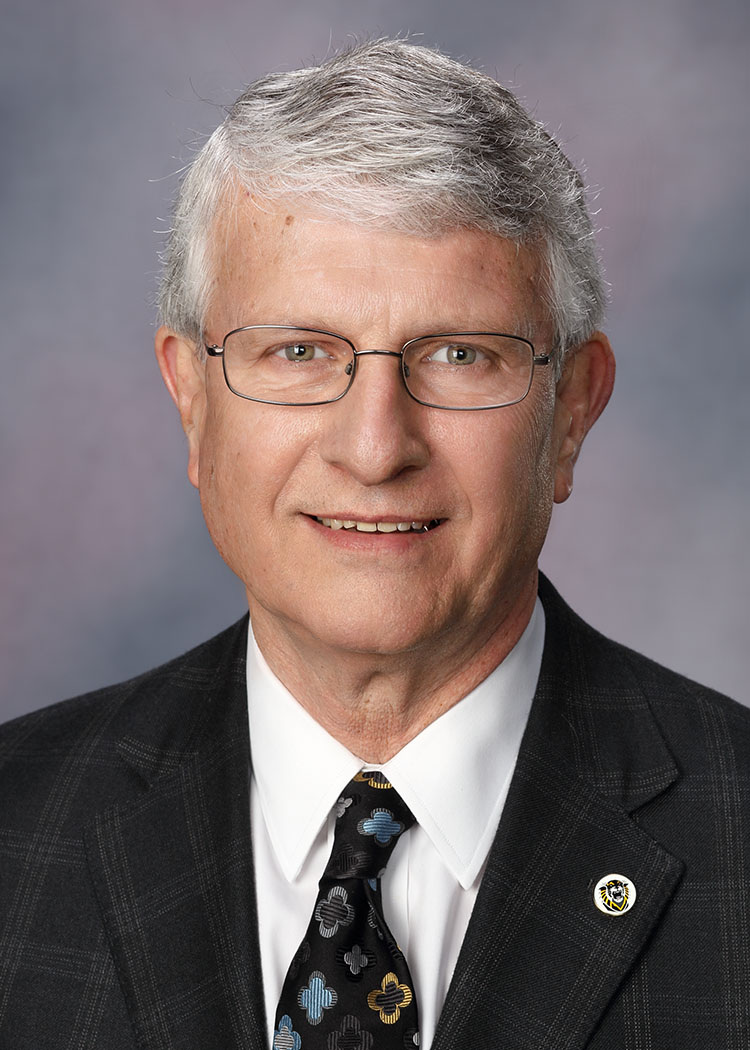

Interim President of Wichita State University
- In office April 1, 2019 – December 31, 2019
- Preceded by: Rick Muma (acting)
- Succeeded by: Jay Golden

Interim President of Fort Hays State University
- In office December 19, 2016 – December 15, 2017
- Preceded by: Mirta Martin
- Succeeded by: Tisa Mason

President of the Kansas Board of Regents
- In office June 1, 2010 – June 30, 2015
- Preceded by: Reggie Robinson
- Succeeded by: Blake Flanders

Commissioner of the Kansas State Department of Education
- In office June 1, 1996 – June 30, 2005
- Preceded by: Lee Droegemueller
- Succeeded by: Bob L. Corkins

Personal details
- Born: John Andrew Tompkins; November 16, 1947 (age 78) Oklahoma, United States
- Spouse: Glenda
- Children: 2
- Education: East Central University (BS); Emporia State University (MS); University of Kansas (PhD)
- Profession: Professor

John Andrew Tompkins (born November 16, 1947) is an American educator in Kansas. Prior to his previous post at Wichita State University, he served as interim president at Fort Hays State, as well as the president of the Kansas Board of Regents from 2010 to 2015. Tompkins was a professor and dean at Pittsburg State University two different times, and served as a superintendent of three different Kansas school districts. Tompkins is also the former Commissioner of the Kansas State Department of Education, serving from June 1, 1996 to June 30, 2005.

== Biography ==
=== Education ===
A native of Oklahoma, Tompkins graduated from East Central University in 1969 where he majored in English. After completing his undergraduate degree, Tompkins attended Emporia State University where he completed his master's degree in education administration in 1973, and completed his doctorate in education from the University of Kansas (KU) in 1977.

=== Early career ===
After graduating from East Central University, Tompkins began his 46-year career as an educator as a secondary teacher in Oklahoma, quickly moving to Hugoton, Kansas the following year. Following a year at Hugoton, Tompkins went to serve as West Franklin High School's principal in Pomona, Kansas before serving as the superintendent at three different school districts from 1977 until 1994. From 1994 to 1996, Tompkins served at Pittsburg State University as the interim dean of the School of Education and the school's Special Services and Administrative Studies department.

=== Later career ===
In 1996, Tompkins was hired as the Education Commissioner for Kansas. Tompkins served at a time when the State School Board was at odds on how to fund public schools and deleted any mention of the word "evolution" from the state's science studies. Tompkins also helped the state implement the No Child Left Behind Act, passed in 2001 by the United States Congress.

Tompkins, who retired in 2005 after serving as the longest education commissioner in Kansas, served under Governors Bill Graves and Kathleen Sebelius.

In 2005, returned to teaching as he accepted a position within the School of Education at KU. Two years later in 2007, Tompkins made a return to Pittsburg State as the College of Education dean. He served that position until June 2010 when he became the President/CEO of the Kansas Board of Regents, the governing board of the seven state universities and 25 community and technical colleges.

During his tenure, which began June 1, 2010, Tompkins faced budget issues when Sam Brownback took office as Governor, leading to university budget cuts. Aside from the budget cuts, Tompkins helped search and hire four Regent university presidents: Michael Shonrock, John Bardo, Mirta Martin and Allison Garrett. Tompkins retired on June 30, 2015.

Tompkins also served as Fort Hays State University's interim president from December 19, 2016 to December 15, 2017. He became interim president of Wichita State in April 2019 after the death of John Bardo.

=== Awards ===
- Kansas Superintendent of the Year, 1992
- Inducted into the Kansas Teachers Hall of Fame, 2001
- KSHSAA Governor's Award, 2002
- KU College of Education Distinguished Service Award, 2004
- ESU Distinguished Alumni Award, 2005
