= Kansas Board of Regents =

State university governing body for Kansas, U.S.

- Formation: July 1, 1925
- Purpose: educational oversight
- Headquarters: 1000 SW Jackson Street; Suite 520; Topeka, Kansas, U.S.
- Members: 32 public institutions
- Interim President & CEO: John Yeary
- Chairman: Alysia Johnston
- Website: www.kansasregents.org

The Kansas Board of Regents is a body consisting of nine members that governs six state universities in the U.S. state of Kansas. In addition to these six universities, it also supervises and coordinates nineteen community colleges, five technical colleges, six technical schools and a municipal university. Refer to the list of colleges and universities for details on the individual schools.

Member universities of the Kansas Board of Regents

== Member selection ==
The Kansas Board of Regents has nine members, each of whom is appointed by the governor of Kansas. Each board member also serves on various committees that address higher education issues.

== Schools governed by the Board of Regents ==
The Kansas Board of Regents oversees 33 institutions, one of which is an independent municipal university.

=== Public universities ===
Institution	Location (main campus)	Founded	Joined KBOR	Full-time Equivalency Enrollment (fall 2022)	Leader
Emporia State University	Emporia	1863	1925	3,464	Matt Baker
Fort Hays State University	Hays	1902	1925	8,146	Tisa Mason
Kansas State University	Manhattan	1863	1925	16,925	Richard Linton
Pittsburg State University	Pittsburg	1903	1925	5,006	Thomas Newsom
University of Kansas	Lawrence	1865	1925	23,779	Doug Girod
University of Kansas Medical Center	Kansas City	1865	1925	2,904	Doug Girod
Wichita State University	Wichita	1895	1964	11,798	Richard Muma
Total enrollment (2025)				72,816	

=== Municipal universities ===
Institution	Location	Founded	Joined KBOR	Full-time Equivalency Enrollment (fall 2025)	Leader
Washburn University (Note: Washburn University is on the independent board, of which the Kansas Board of Regents holds one seat.)	Topeka	1865	1999	4,834	JuliAnn Mazachek
Washburn Institute of Technology (Note: Washburn Institute of Technology is operated by Washburn University.)	Topeka	1964 (merged with Washburn in 2008)	1999	1,271	JuliAnn Mazachek
Total enrollment (2025)				6,105	

=== Public community and technical colleges ===
Institution	Location	Founded	Joined KBOR	Full-Time Equivalent Enrollment (Fall 2025)	President
Allen Community College	Iola	1923	1999	963	Lyvier Leffler
Barton Community College	Great Bend	1965	1999	2,794	Marcus Garstecki
Butler Community College	El Dorado	1927	1999	4,399	Tamara Daniel
Cloud County Community College	Concordia	1965	1999	937	Amber Knoettgen
Coffeyville Community College	Coffeyville	1923	1999	1,147	Marlon Thornburg
Colby Community College	Colby	1964	1999	995	Seth Carter
Cowley County Community College	Arkansas City	1922	1999	1,652	Michelle Schoon
Dodge City Community College	Dodge City	1935	1999	1,199	Harold Nolte
Flint Hills Technical College	Emporia	1963	1999	734	Caron Daugherty
Fort Scott Community College	Fort Scott	1919	1999	637	Alysia Johnston
Garden City Community College	Garden City	1919	1999	1,427	Ryan Ruda
Highland Community College	Highland	1858	1999	1,301	Vincent Bowhay
Hutchinson Community College	Hutchinson	1928	1999	3,109	Tricia Paramore
Independence Community College	Independence	1925	1999	527	Taylor Crawshaw (interim)
Johnson County Community College	Overland Park	1969	1999	9,937	Tony Miksa
Kansas City Kansas Community College	Kansas City	1923	1999	3,273	Greg Mosier
Labette Community College	Parsons	1923	1999	850	Mark Watkins
Manhattan Area Technical College	Manhattan	1965	1999	469	James Genandt
Neosho County Community College	Chanute	1936	1999	1,026	Brian Inbody
North Central Kansas Technical College	Beloit	1996	1999	690	Eric Burks
Northwest Kansas Technical College	Goodland	1964	1999	694	Corey Isbell
Pratt Community College	Pratt	1935	1999	966	Monette DePew (interim)
Salina Area Technical College	Salina	1965	1999	574	Greg Nichols
Seward County Community College	Liberal	1967	1999	1,229	Brad Bennett
WSU Campus of Applied Sciences and Technology	Wichita	1965	1999	4,014	Sheree Utash
Total enrollment (2025)				45,542	
