= Flint Hills Technical College =

Public technical college in Kansas, U.S.

- Motto: Experience. Success.
- Type: Public community college
- Established: 1963; 63 years ago
- President: Caron L. Daugherty
- Vice-president: Lisa Kirmer; Nancy Thompson
- Faculty: 35 full-time and 34 part-time (Spring 2022)
- Students: 1,639 (Fall 2023)
- Location: Emporia, Kansas, United States; 38°25.1038′N 96°13.4599′W
- Colors: Blue and gold
- Nickname: Wranglers
- Website: www.fhtc.edu

Flint Hills Technical College (FHTC) is a public community college in Emporia, Kansas, United States.

== History ==
The college was founded in 1963 by the Emporia School District. FHTC was transferred to the Kansas Board of Regents in July 1999, and separated from the Emporia School District in 2004.

== Governance ==
Undergraduate demographics as of Fall 2023
Race and ethnicity	Total
White	67%
Hispanic	28%
Two or more races	3%
Asian	1%
Black	1%
International student	1%
Economic diversity
Low-income (Note: The percentage of students who received an income-based federal Pell grant intended for low-income students.)	48%
Affluent (Note: The percentage of students who are a part of the American middle class at the bare minimum.)	52%

The college is governed by the Kansas Board of Regents. It is overseen by a board of trustees made up of 7 community members. The board is responsible for the development and operation of FHTC.

== Notable alumni ==
- Clint Bowyer, NASCAR driver

== See also ==
- List of colleges and universities in Kansas
