= John Lohmeyer =

American football player (born 1951)

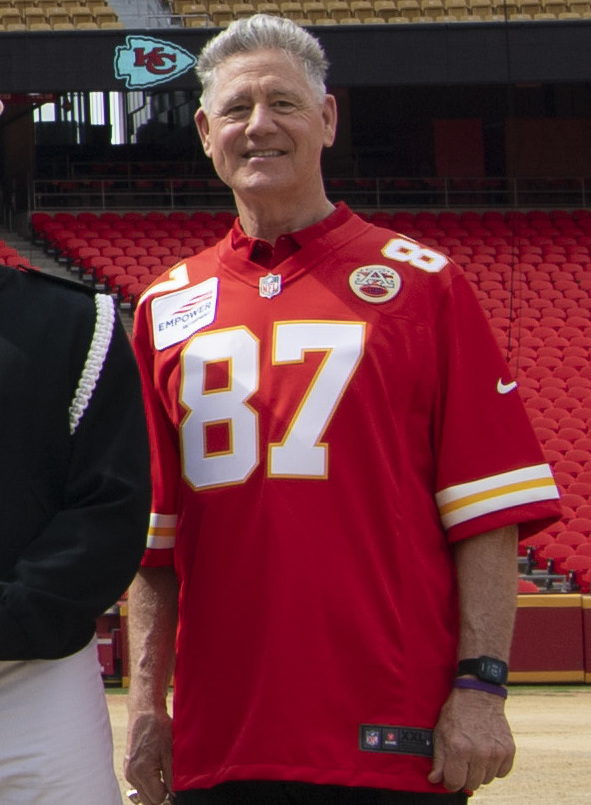
- Lohmeyer at Arrowhead Stadium in 2021

No. 87
- Position: Defensive tackle / Defensive end

Personal information
- Born: January 15, 1951 (age 75); Emporia, Kansas, U.S.
- Listed height: 6 ft 4 in (1.93 m)
- Listed weight: 229 lb (104 kg)

Career information
- High school: Emporia
- College: Emporia State
- NFL draft: 1973: 4th round, 89th overall pick

Career history
- Kansas City Chiefs (1973–1977)

Career NFL statistics
- Touchdowns: 1
- Fumble recoveries: 6
- Safeties: 1
- Stats at Pro Football Reference

John Carl Lohmeyer (born January 15, 1951) is an American former professional football player who was a defensive lineman for four seasons with the Kansas City Chiefs of the National Football League (NFL). He was selected by the Chiefs in the fourth round of the 1973 NFL draft after playing college football for the Emporia State Hornets.

== Early life ==
Lohmeyer attended Emporia High School in Emporia, Kansas.

== College career ==
Lohmeyer played college football for the Hornets at Emporia State University. He was inducted into the Emporia State University Athletics Hall of Honor in 1983.

== Professional career ==
Lohmeyer was selected by the Kansas City Chiefs with the 89th overall pick in the 1973 NFL draft. He played in 41 games, starting fifteen, for the Chiefs from 1973 to 1977. He was also a special teams captain for the Chiefs for three years.

== Personal life ==
Lohmeyer spent ten years as a partner and broker for an insurance agency. He also has ten years of experience in the banking and finance industry. He joined the Emporia State University Foundation as a major gift officer in 2011 and has served as the Foundation's Director of Development.
