= Edward H. Hammond =

American educator and university administrator

Edward Hammond
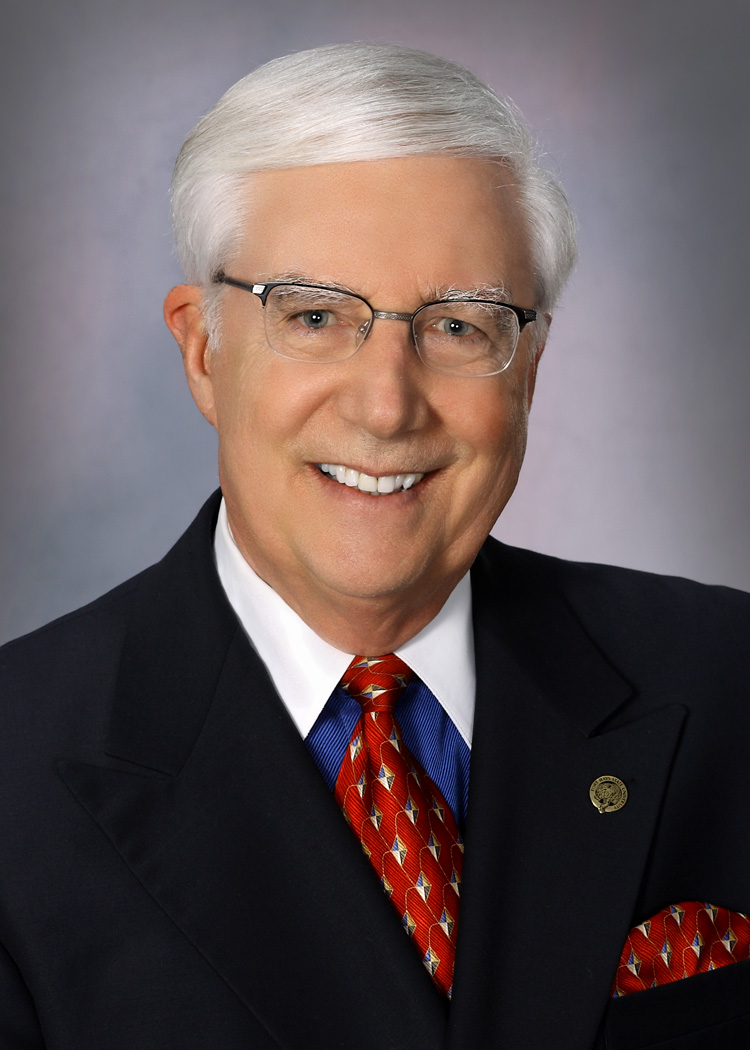

8th President of Fort Hays State University
- In office March 1, 1987 – June 30, 2014
- Preceded by: Gerald Tomanek
- Succeeded by: Mirta Martin

1st Vice President of Student Affairs University of Louisville
- In office July 1, 1976 – February 28, 1987
- Preceded by: Position established
- Succeeded by: Denny Golden

Personal details
- Born: Edward H. Hammond; May 4, 1944 (age 82) McAllen, Texas
- Spouse: Mary
- Children: 2 daughters 1 son
- Education: Emporia State University; B.S. (1966), M.S. (1967); University of Missouri (Ph.D): 1971
- Profession: Professor
- Salary: $196,006

Edward H. Hammond (born May 4, 1944) is an American educator and former president of Fort Hays State University. Prior to his position at Fort Hays State, Hammond served in student affairs at various institutions including Seton Hall University and the University of Louisville. Hammond completed just two months shy of 28 years, making him the longest serving president at Fort Hays State and leader in the Kansas Board of Regents schools.

== Biography ==
=== Education ===
A native of McAllen, Texas but raised in Roeland Park, Kansas, Hammond graduated from Emporia State University in 1966 and completed his master's degree from Emporia State, as well, in 1967. In 1971, Hammond completed his doctor of philosophy from the University of Missouri.

=== Career ===
After completing his doctorate from the University of Missouri, Hammond served as Assistant to the Southern Illinois University Carbondale Chancellor from 1970 to 1972 when he was promoted to Assistant Dean of Students. He served that position for a year. Following his stint at Southern Illinois, Hammond became Seton Hall University's student affairs vice president, a position he held from 1973 to 1976. On July 1, 1976, Hammond was named the University of Louisville's first Student Affairs vice president.

==== University of Louisville ====
As the first student affairs vice president, Hammond was tasked with creating the student affairs division for the university. During his ten years there, Hammond created departments as well as hired staff to oversee already created departments such as Greek Life. Hammond left for Fort Hays State University in March 1987.

==== Fort Hays State University ====
On March 1, 1987, Hammond began his nearly 28-year career as president of Fort Hays State University. During his time at Fort Hays State, Hammond created relationships with the Western Kansas community colleges, expanded the university with additions of new buildings, wind turbines and created the university's first online college system for distance education in 1997. Hammond also built a relationship with SIAS International University in China, establishing a bachelor's program there and making Fort Hays State the first university in the United States to be approved by the Chinese Ministry of Education. Hammond also increased the university's enrollment by 9,000 students over the course of 27 years.

On the athletics side, Hammond helped the university athletic programs transition from the National Association of Intercollegiate Athletics to the National Collegiate Athletic Association Division II, completing the move in 1991. Fifteen years later, Hammond also helped move the university from the Rocky Mountain Athletic Conference to the university's current conference, the Mid-America Intercollegiate Athletics Association in 2006. Hammond was also instrumental in creating the softball program in 1999, and both men's and women's soccer in 2011.

Hammond retired from Fort Hays State on June 30, 2014.
