= Plymouth, Kansas =

Unincorporated community in Lyon County, Kansas

- Unincorporated community
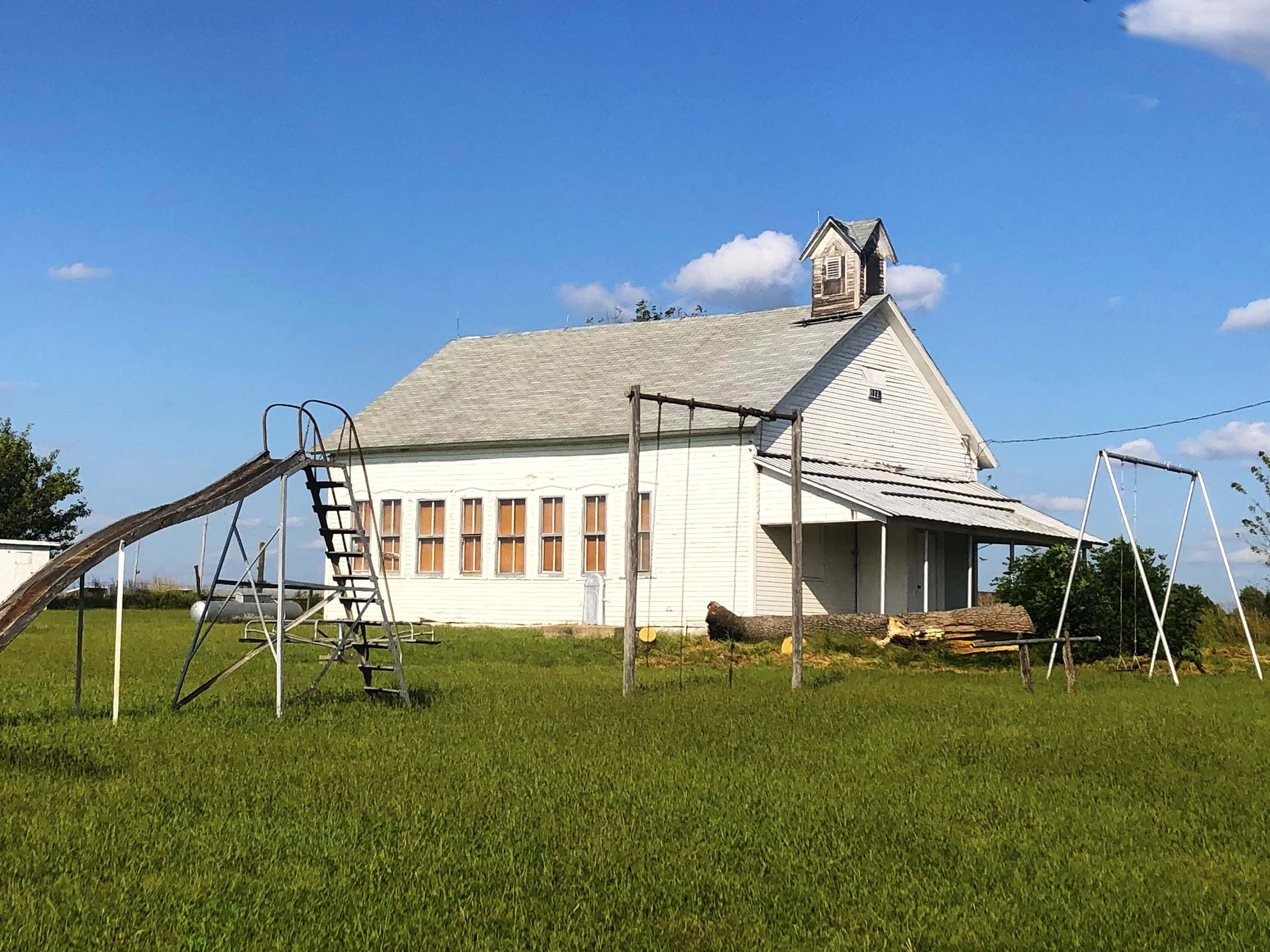
- Old 1882 schoolhouse (2019)

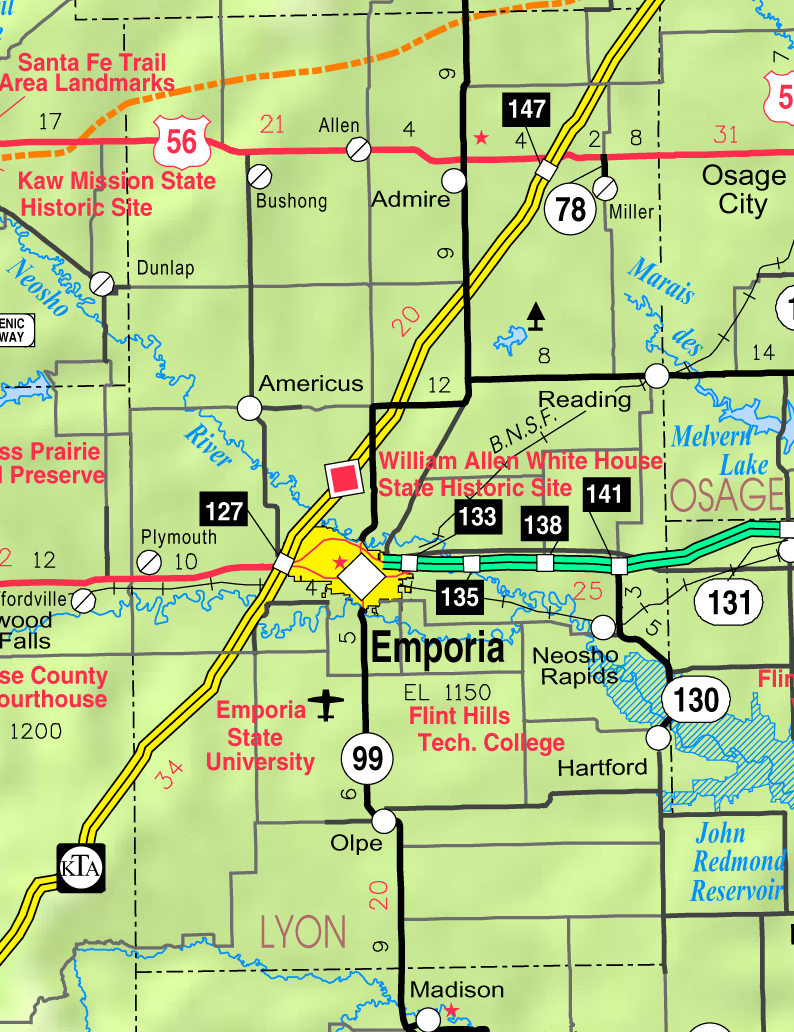
- KDOT map of Lyon County (legend)

- Location within Kansas Location within the United States
- Coordinates: 38°24′50″N 96°19′56″W
- Country: United States
- State: Kansas
- County: Lyon
- Founded: 1850s
- Platted: 1858
- Elevation: 1,165 ft (355 m)
- Time zone: UTC-6 (CST)
  - Summer (DST): UTC-5 (CDT)
- Area code: 620
- FIPS code: 20-56900
- GNIS ID: 477277

Plymouth is an unincorporated community in Lyon County, Kansas, United States. It is located approximately five miles west of the city of Emporia along Road B2.

== History ==
Plymouth was laid out in 1858. The first school class was taught in 1862, the first school house was built in 1864. The present old school house was built in 1882.

Plymouth was a station and shipping point on the Atchison, Topeka and Santa Fe Railway.

A post office was opened in Plymouth in 1858, and remained in operation until it was discontinued in 1930.

== Education ==
The community is served by Emporia USD 253 public school district.

== Transportation ==
The Atchison, Topeka and Santa Fe Railway formerly provided passenger rail service to Plymouth along their mainline until at least 1936. As of 2025, the nearest passenger rail station is located in Newton, where Amtrak's Southwest Chief stops once daily on a route from Chicago to Los Angeles.
