= Edward Hammond =

Edward Hammond may refer to:

- Edward Hammond (politician) (1812–1882), U.S. Congressman from Maryland, 1849–1853
- Edward H. Hammond (born 1944), American educator and former president of Fort Hays State University
- Edward Hammond (priest), English Anglican priest
