= Emporia High School =

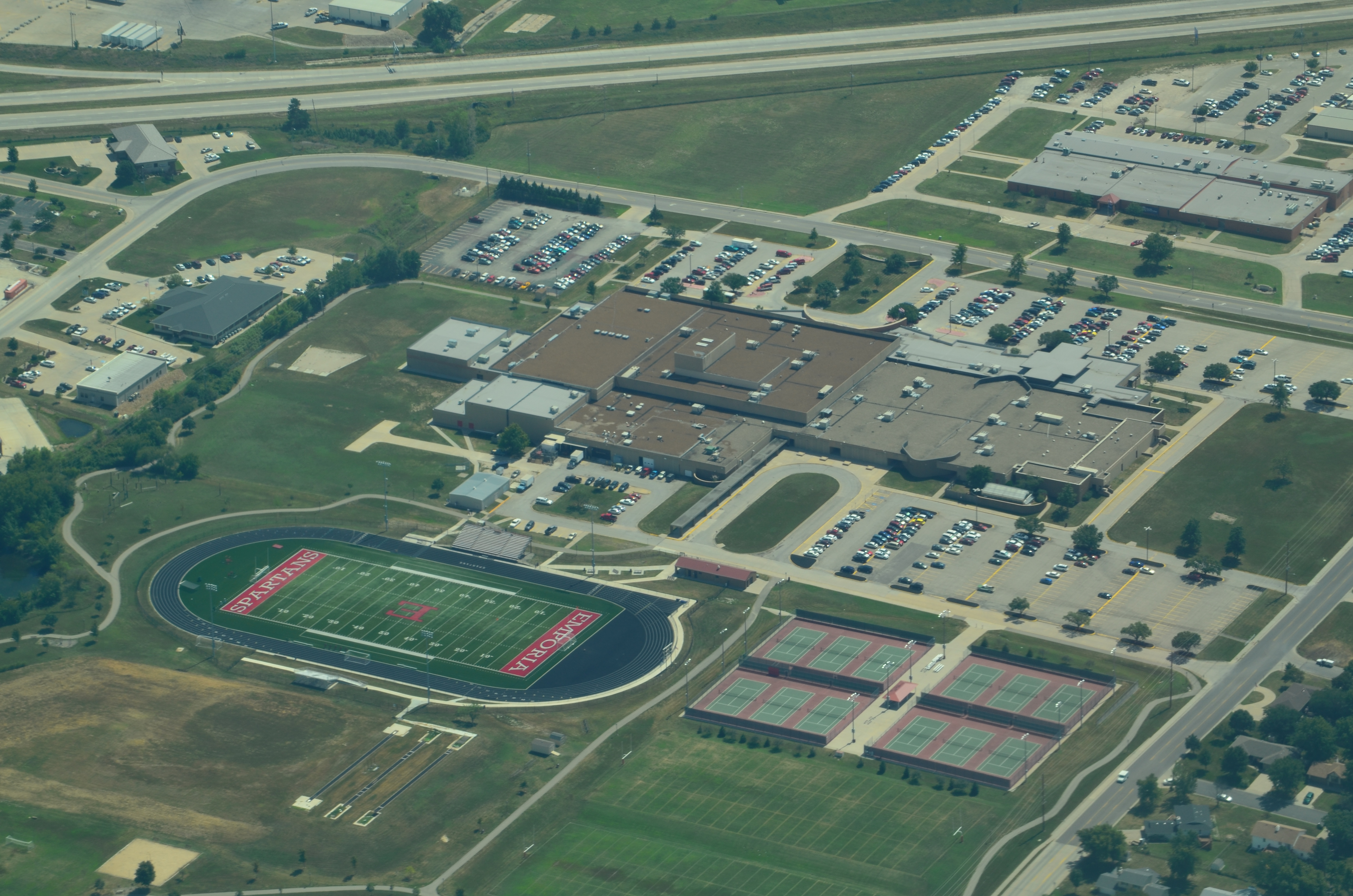

Location
- 3302 West 18th Street; Emporia, Kansas 66801; United States
- Coordinates: 38.421150°N 96.224359°W

Information
- School type: Public, High School
- Opened: 1864
- Status: Open
- School board: Board Website
- School district: Emporia USD 253
- Superintendent: David McGehee
- CEEB code: 170923
- Principal: Dathan Fischer
- Teaching staff: 91.32 (FTE)
- Grades: 9 to 12
- Gender: coed
- Enrollment: 1,283 (2024–25)
- Average class size: 24
- Student to teacher ratio: 16.87
- Language: English, Spanish
- Colors: Red and Black
- Fight song: On, Emporia! (tune of On, Wisconsin!)
- Athletics: 24 Varsity Teams
- Athletics conference: Centennial League
- Sports: Yes
- Mascot: Spartan
- Team name: Emporia High Spartans
- Rival: Washburn Rural High School
- Yearbook: The Echo
- Communities served: Emporia
- Graduates (2013): 316
- Athletic Director: Beau Welch
- Website: School website

Emporia High School is a public secondary school in Emporia, Kansas, United States. It is the sole high school operated by Emporia USD 253 school district, and serves students of grades 9 to 12. Emporia has an enrollment of approximately 1,400 students and a teaching staff of 130. The principal is Dathan Fischer. The school mascot is the Spartan and the school colors are red and black.

Emporia High was established in the early 1900s in order to help educate the increasing population of Emporia. Emporia High is a member of the Kansas State High School Activities Association and offers a variety of sports programs. Athletic teams compete in the 5A division and are known as the "Spartans". Extracurricular activities are also offered in the form of performing arts, school publications, and clubs.

== Extracurricular Activities ==
The Spartans compete in the Centennial League and are classified as a 5A school, the second-largest classification in Kansas according to the Kansas State High School Activities Association. Throughout its history, Emporia has won several state championships in various sports. Many graduates have gone on to participate in collegiate athletics.

=== Wrestling ===
Emporia's wrestling team has been successful for many years, having won eleven team state championships in 1980, 1983, 1984, 1987, 1988, 1989, 1995, 1996, 2000, 2009, and 2010. As of 2013, the Spartans have been the Centennial League Champions for 30 consecutive years.

=== Cross Country ===
Emporia's cross country team has won the state title 5 times, occurring in 1969, 1988, 1991, 1993, and 2007.

=== State Championships ===
State Championships
Season	Sport	Number of Championships	Year
Fall	Football	1	1976
Fall	Cross Country, Boys	5	1969, 1988, 1991, 1993, 2007
Winter	Wrestling	11	1980, 1983, 1984, 1987, 1988, 1989, 1995, 1996, 2000, 2009, 2010
Winter	Basketball, Boys	2	1924, 1934
Spring	Track and Field	2	1995, 2008
Spring	Golf, Boys	1	1964
Spring	Bowling	1	2016
Total		23	

== Notable alumni ==
- Clint Bowyer - NASCAR driver
- Clarence Clay Jr. - geophysicist specialized in oceanography.
- Dale Corson - 8th President of Cornell University
- Tex Johnston - Test pilot
- J. L. Lewis - professional golfer on the PGA Tour
- Evan Lindquist - Artist, Printmaker, Arkansas Artist Laureate
- John Lohmeyer - NFL player
- Brock Pemberton - Broadway producer, originator of the Tony Awards
- Harold See - former Associate Justice of the Alabama Supreme Court
- Dean Smith - former Hall of Fame basketball coach for the North Carolina Tar Heels
- Oscar Stauffer - founder of Stauffer Communications.
- Grant Timmerman - World War II Medal of Honor recipient (posthumous)
