= Emporia Municipal Airport =

- IATA: none; ICAO: KEMP; FAA LID: EMP

Summary
- Airport type: Public
- Owner/Operator: City of Emporia
- Serves: Emporia, Kansas
- Location: Emporia, Kansas
- Opened: December 1944
- Elevation AMSL: 1,208 ft / 368 m
- Coordinates: 38°19′50″N 96°11′23.8″W
- Website: Emporia Airport Website
- Interactive map of Emporia Municipal Airport

Runways
Direction	Length		Surface
Direction	ft	m	Surface
1-19	5,000	1,524	Asphalt
6-24	4,000	1,181	Turf

Statistics (2013)
- Aircraft Operations: 31,250
- Based aircraft: 45
- Sources: AirNav.com

Emporia Municipal Airport (ICAO: KEMP, FAA LID: EMP) is a city-owned public-use airport, located five miles south of Emporia, in Lyon County, Kansas.

== Facilities ==
Emporia Municipal Airport covers 650 acres (260 ha) at an elevation of 1,208 feet (368 m). It has two runways: 1/19 is 4,999 by 100 feet (1,524 x 30 m) asphalt and 6/24 is 3,875 by 298 feet (1,181 x 91 m) turf.

In the year ending October 31, 2006 the airport had 31,250 aircraft operations, average 85 per day: 96% general aviation, 3% air taxi and 1% military. 45 aircraft were then based at the airport: 67% single-engine, 7% multi-engine, 2% jet, 2% helicopter and 22% ultralight.

== See also ==
- List of airports in Kansas
