= Salina Area Technical College =

Coordinates: 38°47′37″N 97°38′15″W

- Former name: Salina Area Vocational-Technical School
- Established: 1965
- President: Greg Nichols
- Students: 1,007 (Fall 2023)
- Location: Salina, Kansas, United States
- Colors: Maroon and black
- Website: salinatech.edu

Salina Area Technical College is a public technical college in Salina, Kansas, United States. The college is coordinated by the Kansas Board of Regents and regionally accredited by the Higher Learning Commission. It has been in operation since 1965 and offers associate degrees, diplomas, and certificates.

== History ==
Salina Area Technical College opened in 1965 on the former Schilling Air Force Base with 189 students enrolled in nine programs.

From 1965 to 2008, Salina Tech was known as the Salina Area Vocational Technical School, and was part of the Salina School District. In 2008, it became an independent technical college. In November 2016, the college was accredited by the Higher Learning Commission.

In the fall of 2019, the college had nearly 800 students, an increase of 69 percent in the past five years.
