= Fort Hays Tech North Central =

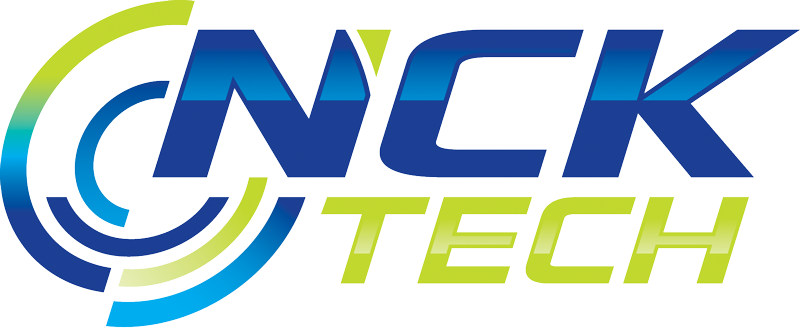
- Former names: North Central Kansas Technical College (1996–2024); North Central Kansas Area Vocational-Technical School (1964–1996)
- Motto: Hands-On Skills. High-Tech Careers.
- Type: Public technical college
- Established: 1964
- President: Eric Burks
- Dean: Sandra Gottschalk
- Faculty: 100
- Students: 957 (Fall 2023)
- Location: Beloit, Kansas, United States; 39°28′53.13″N 98°6′39.11″W
- Colors: Blue and Green
- Website: ncktc.edu

Fort Hays Tech North Central (formerly North Central Kansas Technical College, abbreviated NCK Tech) is a public technical school in Beloit, Kansas, United States. From its establishment in 1964 to the time the Kansas Board of Regents took over the college, the name of the school was North Central Kansas Area Vocational-Technical School.

== Governance ==
The Kansas Board of Regents governs six universities and coordinates and supervises Kansas’ 19 community colleges, five technical colleges, and five technical schools. Institutions that wish to deliver approved programs or courses within the service area governed by the North Central Kansas Technical College Board of Trustees.
