= Washburn Institute of Technology =

Public institute of technology in Topeka, Kansas, United States

- Other name: Washburn Tech
- Former names: Northeast Kansas Vocational Technical School (1964–1967); Kaw Area Vocational Technical School (1967–1992); Kaw Area Technical School (1992–2008)
- Type: Public technical institute
- Established: 1964 (62 years ago)
- Parent institution: Washburn University
- President: JuliAnn Mazachek
- Dean: Scott Smathers
- Students: 1,187 (Fall 2023)
- Location: Topeka, Kansas, United States; 39.044363°N 95.751289°W
- Campus: Urban
- Colors: Yale blue and white
- Website: washburntech.edu

The Washburn Institute of Technology (Washburn Tech) is a public institute of technology in Topeka, Kansas, United States. It is part of Washburn University and awards associate degrees and certificates in professional and technical disciplines.

== History ==
The school was established in 1941 as the Topeka Trade School. Kansas lawmakers passed legislation in 1964 creating the Northeast Kansas Vocational Technical School. It became the Kaw Area Vocational Technical School in 1967 and opened the doors of its current facility in 1968. In 1992, the school became the Kaw Area Technical School. Responsibility for the school was changed from Topeka Unified School District 501 Board of Education to Washburn University in 2008, and the name was changed to Washburn Institute of Technology around that time.

== See also ==
- Education in Kansas
- List of colleges and universities in Kansas
