= Emporia USD 253 =

Public school district in Emporia, Kansas

Address
- 1700 W. 7th Ave. Emporia, Kansas, 66801; United States
- Coordinates: 38°24′26″N 96°12′4″W

District information
- Type: Public
- Grades: K to 12
- Superintendent: David McGehee
- School board: 7 members
- Schools: 10

Other information
- Website: usd253.org

Emporia USD 253 is a public unified school district headquartered in Emporia, Kansas, United States. The district includes the communities of Emporia, Plymouth, and nearby rural areas.

== Administration ==
Emporia Public Schools is led by Superintendent David McGehee.

== Board of education ==
The Emporia Board of Education is composed of seven elected citizens from the community and meets on the second and fourth Wednesdays, of each month, at Mary Herbert Education Office (District office).

== Schools ==
The school district operates the following schools:

Secondary schools:

- Emporia High School
- Emporia Middle School

Primary schools:

- Logan Avenue Elementary School
- Riverside Elementary School
- Timmerman Elementary School
- Village Elementary School
- William Allen White Elementary School
- Walnut Elementary School

Early childhood:

- Jones Early Childhood Development Center

Other:

- Flint Hills Learning Center
- Village Elementary has two indoor gardens where there are fish, turtles and banana trees.

== See also ==
- Kansas State Department of Education
- Kansas State High School Activities Association
- List of high schools in Kansas
- List of unified school districts in Kansas
