= Fort Hays State University =

Public university in Hays, Kansas, U.S.

- Former names: Western Branch of the Kansas Normal School (1902–1914); Fort Hays Kansas State Normal School (1914–1923); Kansas State Teachers College of Hays (1923–1931); Fort Hays State College (1931–1977)
- Motto: "Forward thinking. World ready."
- Type: Public university
- Established: 1902; 124 years ago
- Parent institution: Kansas Board of Regents
- Accreditation: HLC
- Academic affiliations: Space-grant
- Endowment: $194 million (2025)
- President: Tisa Mason
- Provost: Jill Arensdorf
- Academic staff: 851
- Students: 12,878 (fall 2024)
- Location: Hays, Kansas, United States; 38°52′24″N 99°20′36″W
- Campus: 200 acres (0.81 km^{2}); Remote town
- Media: Tiger Media Network
- Colors: Black and gold
- Nickname: Tigers
- Sporting affiliations: NCAA Division II – The MIAA; GAC
- Mascot: Victor E. Tiger
- Website: www.fhsu.edu

Fort Hays State University (FHSU) is a public university in Hays, Kansas, United States. It is the largest university in western Kansas, and the fourth largest of the six state universities governed by the Kansas Board of Regents, with a total enrollment of approximately 15,100 students.

== History ==
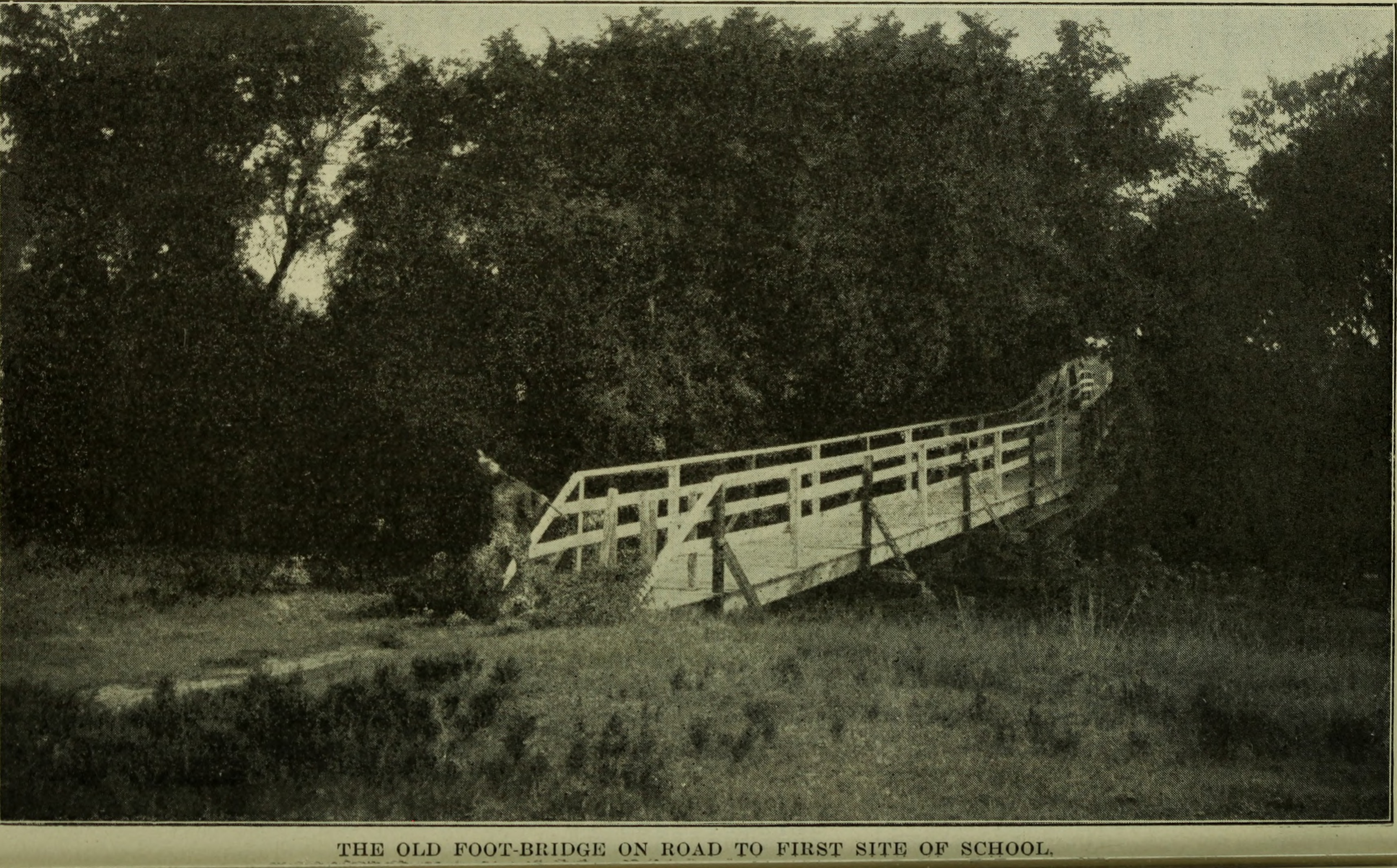
Footbridge leading to the site of Fort Hays Auxiliary State Normal School from the catalogue published its first year

Founded in 1902, FHSU began as the Western Branch of Kansas State Normal School, now known as Emporia State University. It has been known as Fort Hays Kansas Normal School and Fort Hays State Normal School. It was located on the grounds of Fort Hays, a frontier military outpost that was closed in 1889. The university served the early settlers' needs for educational facilities in the new region. The first building closer to Hays was completed in 1904, at which time the university moved to its present location. The modern campus is still located on a portion of the former military reservation from the fort. FHSU was first to be founded as an agricultural based school but was then determined to be a normal school. The normal school was supposed to be supported in part by the agricultural experiment station. For years, the University Dairy Unit supplied the school cafeteria with fresh milk.

During the Great Flood of 1951, Big Creek, a tributary of the Kansas River, flooded nearly all of campus, forcing a midnight evacuation.

=== Presidents ===
1. William S. Picken (1902–1913)
2. William A. Lewis (1913–1933)
3. Clarence E. Rarick (1933–1941)
4. Lyman D. Wooster (1941–1949)
5. Morton C. Cunningham (1949–1969)
6. John W. Gustad (1969–1975)
7. Gerald W. Tomanek (1975–1987)
8. Edward H. Hammond (1987–2014)
9. Mirta M. Martin (2014–2016)
  1. Mike Barnett (acting) (2016)
  2. Andy Tompkins (interim) (2016–2017)
10. Tisa Mason (2017–present)

=== Attempted merger with Dodge City Community College ===
In March 2014, it was announced that Dodge City Community College might become part of Fort Hays State University under a proposal that would create the first public four-year degree-granting college in southwest Kansas. The college would have been known as Fort Hays State University at Dodge City had the plan been approved by the Kansas Board of Regents. Fort Hays faculty could have taught other four-year programs in Dodge City, while courses typically taken by college freshmen and sophomores would remain the same. The proposal would have also required $10 million to build a technical institute and $5 million per year in state funding. The proposal required approval from the board of regents, followed by the state Legislature and the governor.

On November 11, 2014, the community college's Board of Trustees voted 3–3 on a proposal that recommended that Fort Hays become an upper division college and technical institute in Dodge City, with the Dodge City college remaining independent. With this vote, the merger collapsed.

As of 2019 the university had a total enrollment of approximately 15,100 students with 4,648 attending on-campus programs; 6,882 participating in online programs; and 3,570 in the Chinese program.

== Campus ==
The main campus sits on 200 acres (0.81 km^{2}) of the 4,160 acres (16.8 km^{2}) owned by the state and deeded to the university. The campus property includes more than 40 limestone-faced buildings. Big Creek, a winding stream that traverses the campus, not only enhances the beauty of the campus, but also serves as a natural laboratory for students in the biological sciences. The campus is located just to the west of the Hays business district, two miles (3.2 km) south of Interstate 70. Several businesses in downtown Hays cater specifically to FHSU students.

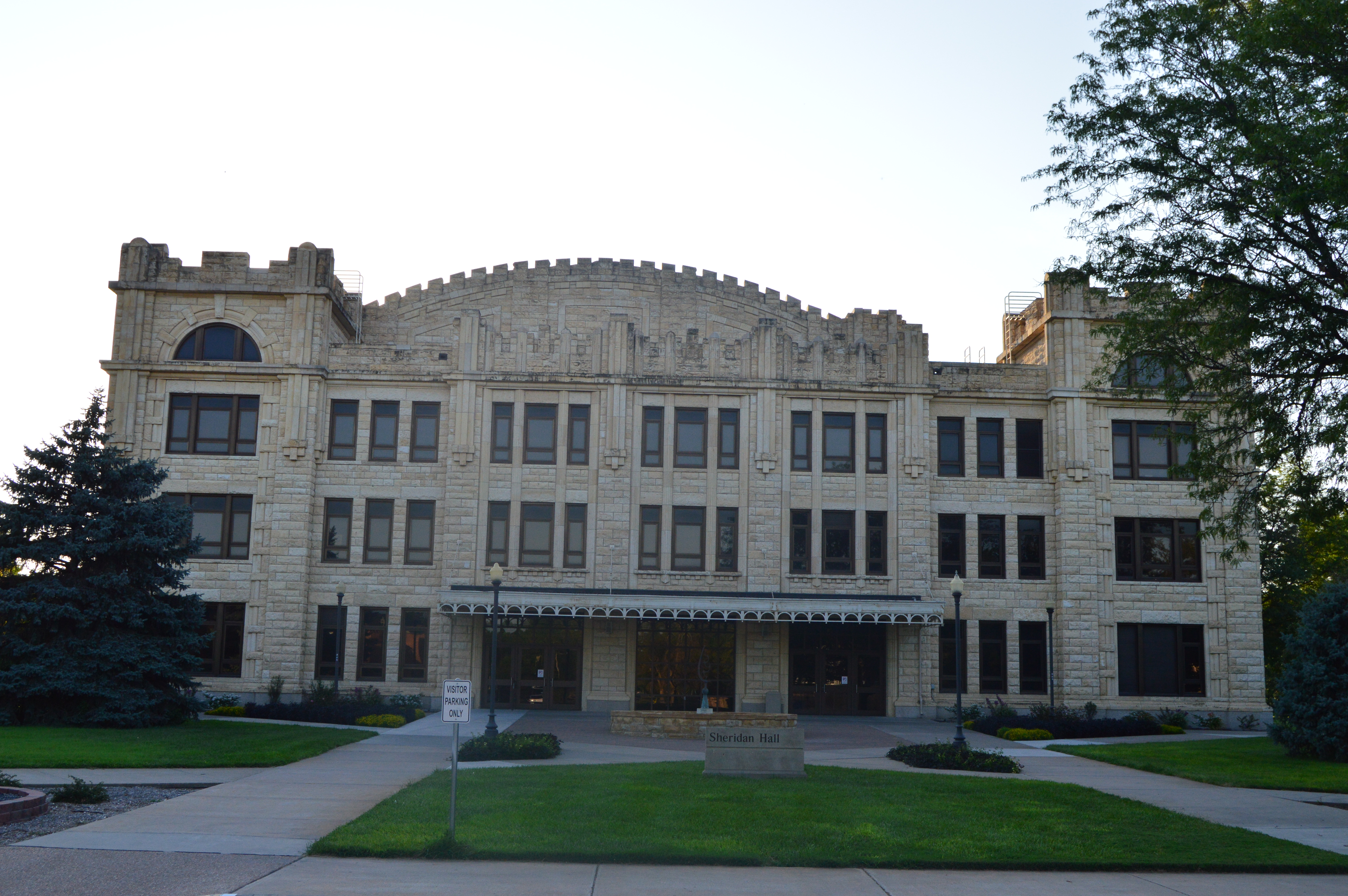
Sheridan Hall

The buildings of Fort Hays State University are all dedicated to someone or are an important part of FHSU's history.

=== Sternberg Museum of Natural History ===
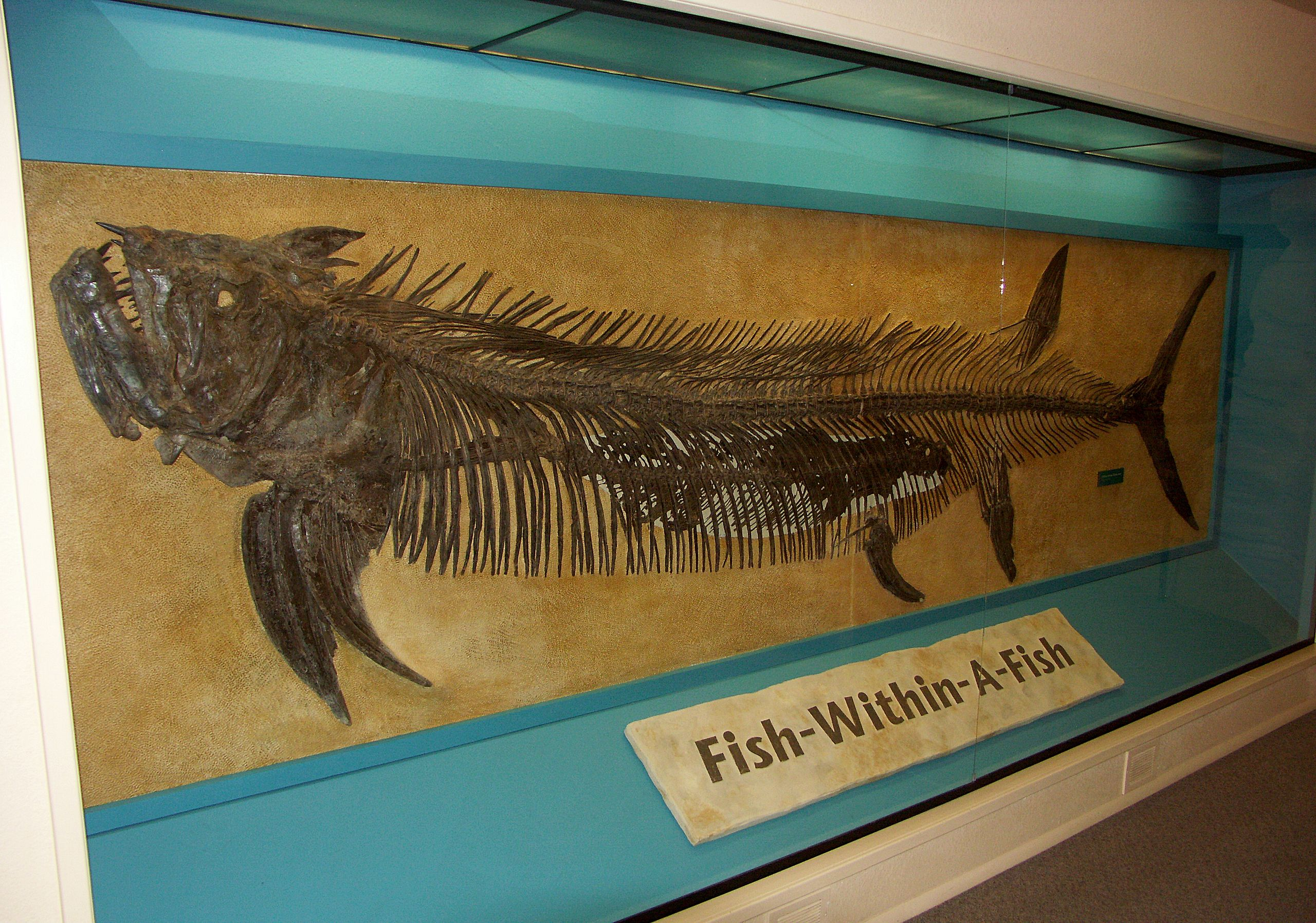
Gillicus arcuatus within the stomach of Xiphactinus audax, George F. Sternberg's most famous fossil find

The university's Sternberg Museum of Natural History features interactive natural science exhibitions, many traveling and temporary exhibitions, an acclaimed Discovery Room, and a Museum Store. The museum houses over 100,000 square feet (10,000 m^{2}) of fossil dinosaurs, mosasaurs, pterosaurs, fish and various other prehistoric species that inhabited Kansas over 70–80 million years ago. The Sternberg Museum also includes more than 3.7 million specimens in collections of paleontology, geology, history, archaeology, ethnology, botany, entomology, ichthyology, herpetology, ornithology and mammalogy. All these major exhibits contain at least one creature/plant named after Sternberg.

The university's museum was renamed the Sternberg Memorial Museum after the death in 1969 of George F. Sternberg, who had developed it. The current museum was formed in 1991 when the university's museum was merged with the Museum of the High Plains.

In 2010, researchers at the museum showed that plankton-eating fish flourished in the ocean at the same time as the dinosaurs, filling in a 106-million-year gap in the fossil record. One of the authors of the paper was Mike Everhart, a curator of paleontology at the museum.

In 2026, it was announced that the museum would close as a result of state funding cuts, unless $1 million can be raised by December 31, 2026.

== Academics ==
Undergraduate demographics as of Fall 2023
Race and ethnicity	Total
White	49%
Unknown	37%
Hispanic	6%
Black	3%
Asian	2%
International student	2%
Two or more races	2%
Economic diversity
Low-income (Note: The percentage of students who received an income-based federal Pell grant intended for low-income students.)	23%
Affluent (Note: The percentage of students who are a part of the American middle class at the bare minimum.)	77%

FHSU comprises five colleges (Arts, Humanities and Social Sciences; Business and Entrepreneurship; Education; Health and Behavioral Sciences; and Science, Technology and Mathematics) which together have 31 departments and offer more than 60 academic majors for undergraduates and 20 for graduate students.

=== Docking Institute of Public Affairs ===
The Docking Institute is a public policy research institute whose mission is to enhance effective decision-making among governmental and non-profit leaders. The institute has six focus areas:

1. Survey research, program evaluation research, public policy research, and community and economic development research
2. Strategic planning and consulting
3. Grants facilitation
4. Economic and community development consulting
5. Public administration training programs
6. Public affairs programming (conferences, speakers, forums, media events, scholarly publications, etc.)

In addition, the university hosts the Sebelius Lecture Series each year. The series is named for former United States Representative Keith Sebelius, who graduated from Fort Hays State University in 1941. Each semester, Fort Hays State University invites nationally recognized leaders to the campus to serve as keynote speakers.

== Athletics ==
The Fort Hays State athletic teams are called the Tigers. The university is a member of the NCAA Division II ranks, primarily competing in the Mid-America Intercollegiate Athletics Association (MIAA) for most of its sports since the 2006–07 academic year; while its men's soccer team competes in the Great American Conference (GAC). The Tigers previously competed in the Rocky Mountain Athletic Conference (RMAC) from 1989–90 to 2005–06 (which they were a member on a previous stint from 1968–69 to 1971–72); in the Central States Intercollegiate Conference (CSIC) of the National Association of Intercollegiate Athletics (NAIA) from 1976–77 to 1988–89; in the Great Plains Athletic Conference (GPAC) from 1972–73 to 1975–76; in the Central Intercollegiate Athletic Conference (CIC) from 1923–24 to 1967–68; and in the Kansas Collegiate Athletic Conference (KCAC) from 1902–03 to 1922–23.

Fort Hays State competes in 18 intercollegiate varsity sports: Men's sports include baseball, basketball, cross country, football, golf, soccer, track & field (indoor and outdoor) and wrestling; while women's sports include basketball, cross country, golf, soccer, softball, tennis, track & field (indoor and outdoor) and volleyball.

=== Basketball ===
The Fort Hays State basketball programs hold four national basketball titles; the men's team claimed national championships in 1984 and 1985 (NAIA), back to back, and in 1996 (NCAA Division II) with a remarkable 34–0 record. The women's team also brought home the national title in 1991 (NAIA).

=== Cross country ===
The men's cross country program owns four national championships, all as a member of the NAIA, occurring in 1963, 1965, 1968, and 1969.

=== Baseball ===
The baseball program was NCAA Division II national runner-up in 2000.

=== Shooting sports ===
The FHSU shooting team won third place in 2009 in the American Trap event at the National ACUI competition.

=== Mascot ===
The FHSU mascot has been the tiger since 1914. It is thought that W.A. Lewis, who was president of FHSU when it was still known as the Western Branch Normal School, may have chosen the mascot. The tiger mascot has changed over time, but the current mascot has been used since April 3, 2000. The mascot's name, Victor E. Tiger, was announced later that year on September 9 at the annual TailGate. A mascot costume affiliated with the FHSU cheerleaders is used to promote FHSU sporting events.

== Oktoberfest and homecoming weekend ==
Each year, Fort Hays State holds a celebration called Oktoberfest. It is a celebration of the Volga German heritage of Ellis County. It is held at Frontier Park in downtown Hays on the Friday before FHSU's homecoming. For entertainment, there is polka music and various booths that serve a variety of German food and beer. The first keg is tapped around 11:00 a.m. which officially begins Oktoberfest. There is also a homecoming parade on Saturday morning where student organizations decorate floats or walk in the parade for FHSU spirit. The homecoming football game begins Saturday afternoon.

== Student media ==
Student media at Fort Hays is housed under the banner Tiger Media Network, which includes radio and TV, stemming from their website at tigermedianet.com.

== Notable alumni ==
- Vashone Adams, NFL player
- Greg Anderson, personal trainer linked to the BALCO steroids scandal
- Steve Crosby, NFL player, scout, and coach
- Sheila Frahm, former Lieutenant Governor of Kansas and former United States senator
- Eric Ian Spoutz, art dealer; historian; museum curator
- Kris Kuksi, visual artist
- Lynn Lashbrook, president and founder of SMWW
- M. T. Liggett, folk sculptor
- Kathryn McCarthy, U.S. Representative from Kansas
- Tim McCarty, East Central University football coach
- Milton McGriggs, American football player
- Les Miller, NFL player
- Frankie Neal, NFL player
- Nola Ochs, world's oldest college graduate (95 in 2007)
- Pillar, band which formed at the university in 1998
- Scott Schwab, 32nd Secretary of State of Kansas
- Nathan Shepherd, NFL player
- Jerry Simmons, NFL strength and conditioning coach
- Jim Smallwood, Colorado state senator
- Mickey Spillane, detective novelist (freshman year only)
- David Younger, politician

== Gallery ==
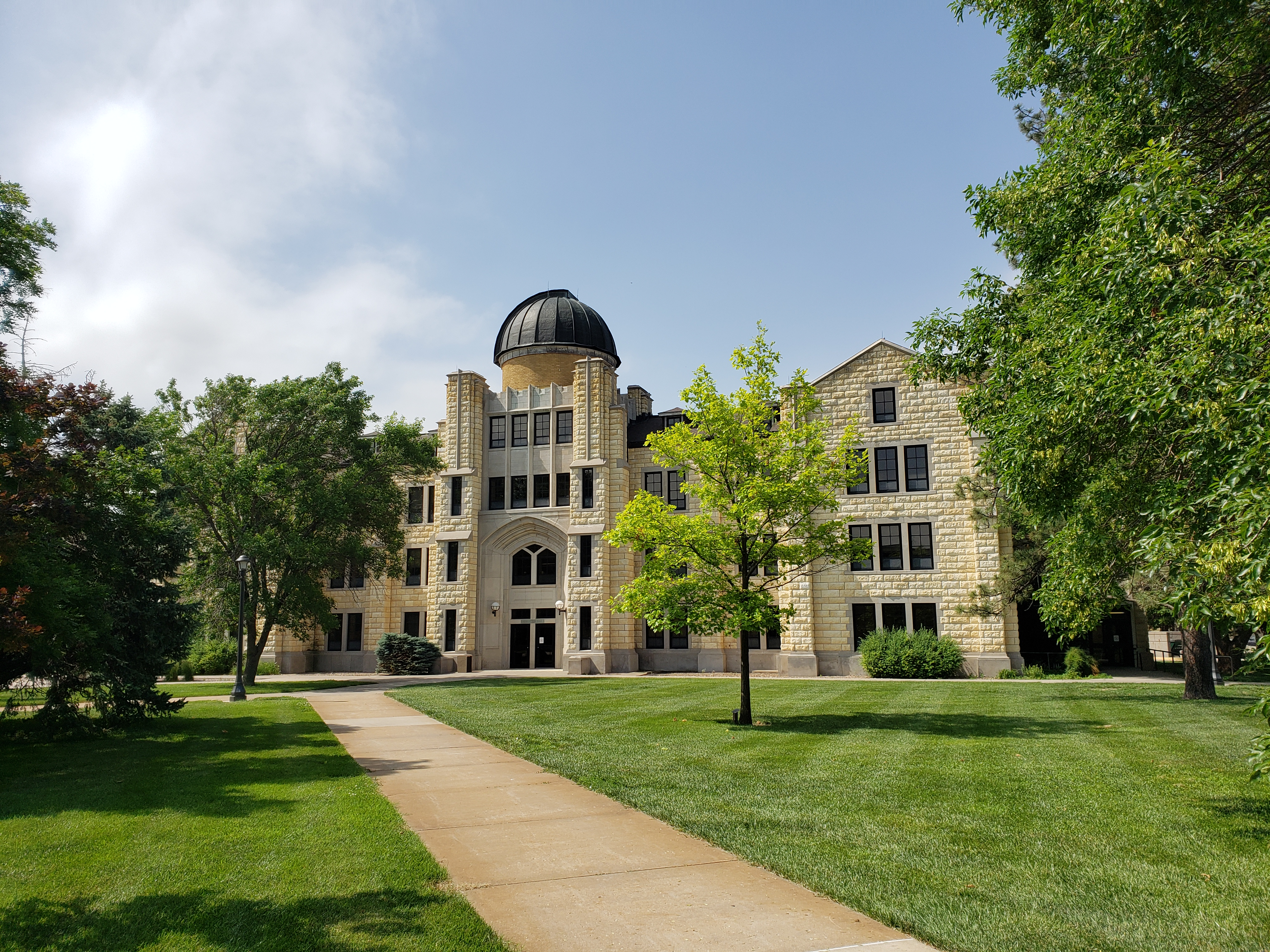
Albertson Hall

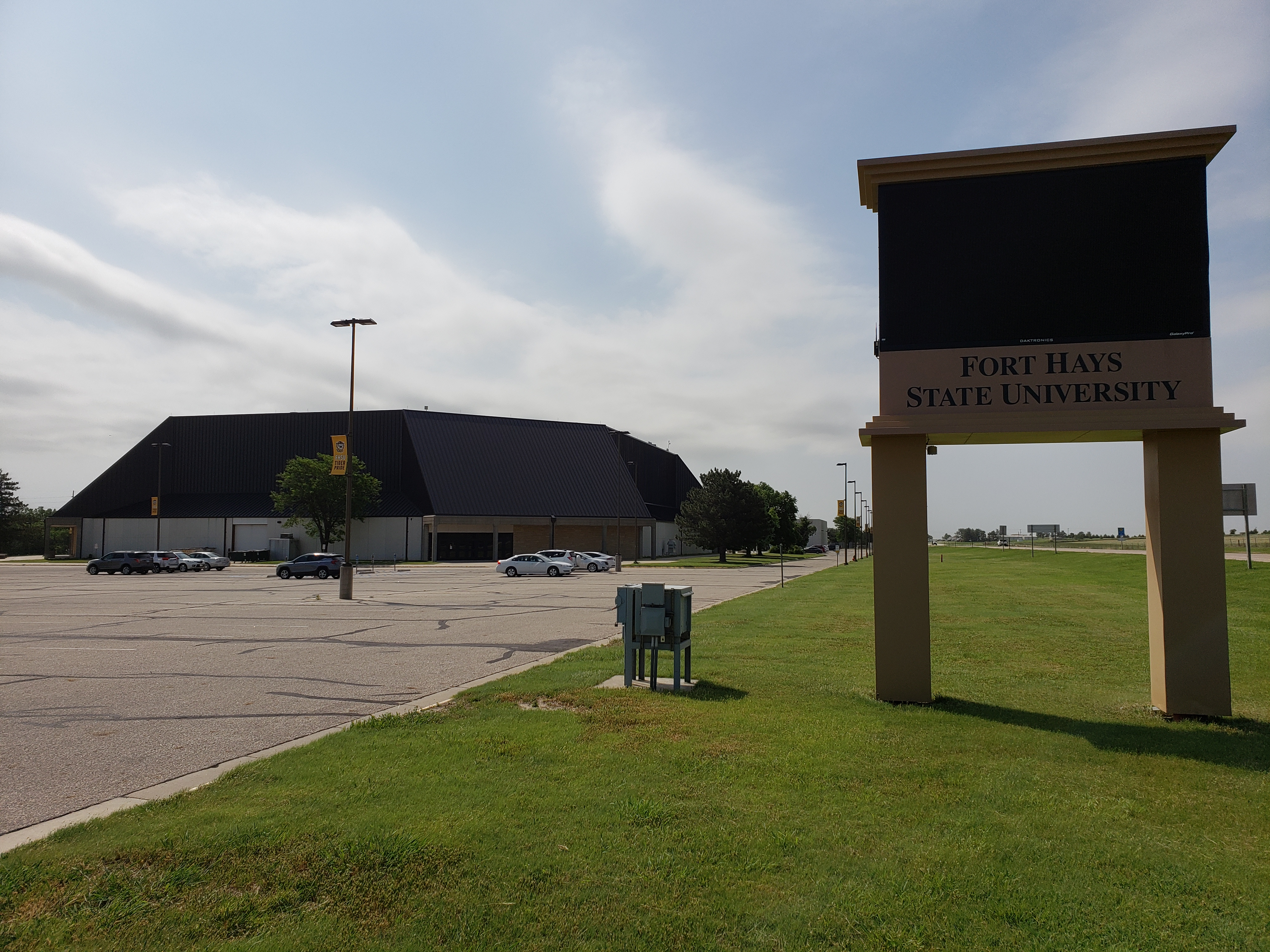
Gross Memorial Coliseum

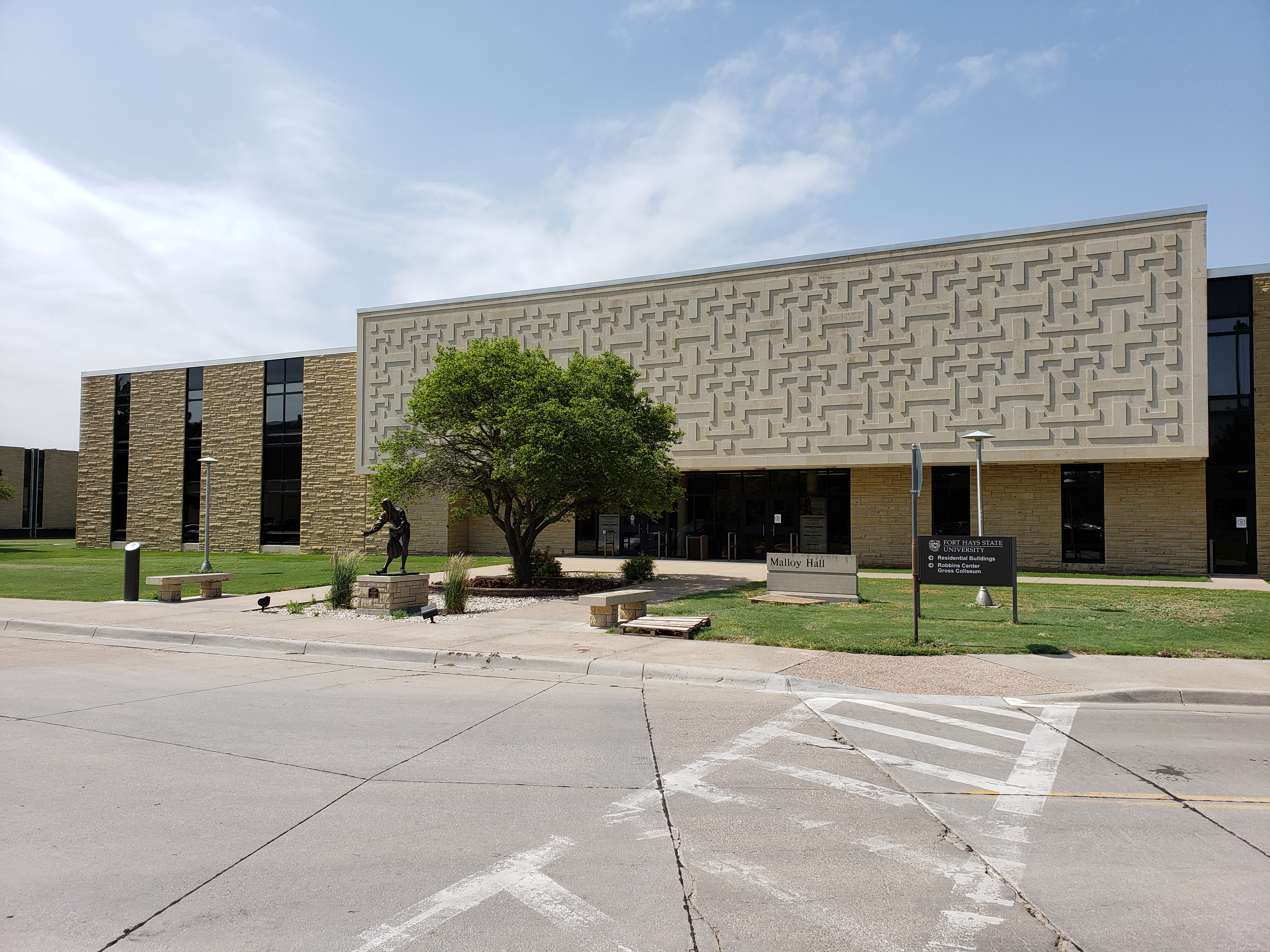
Malloy Hall

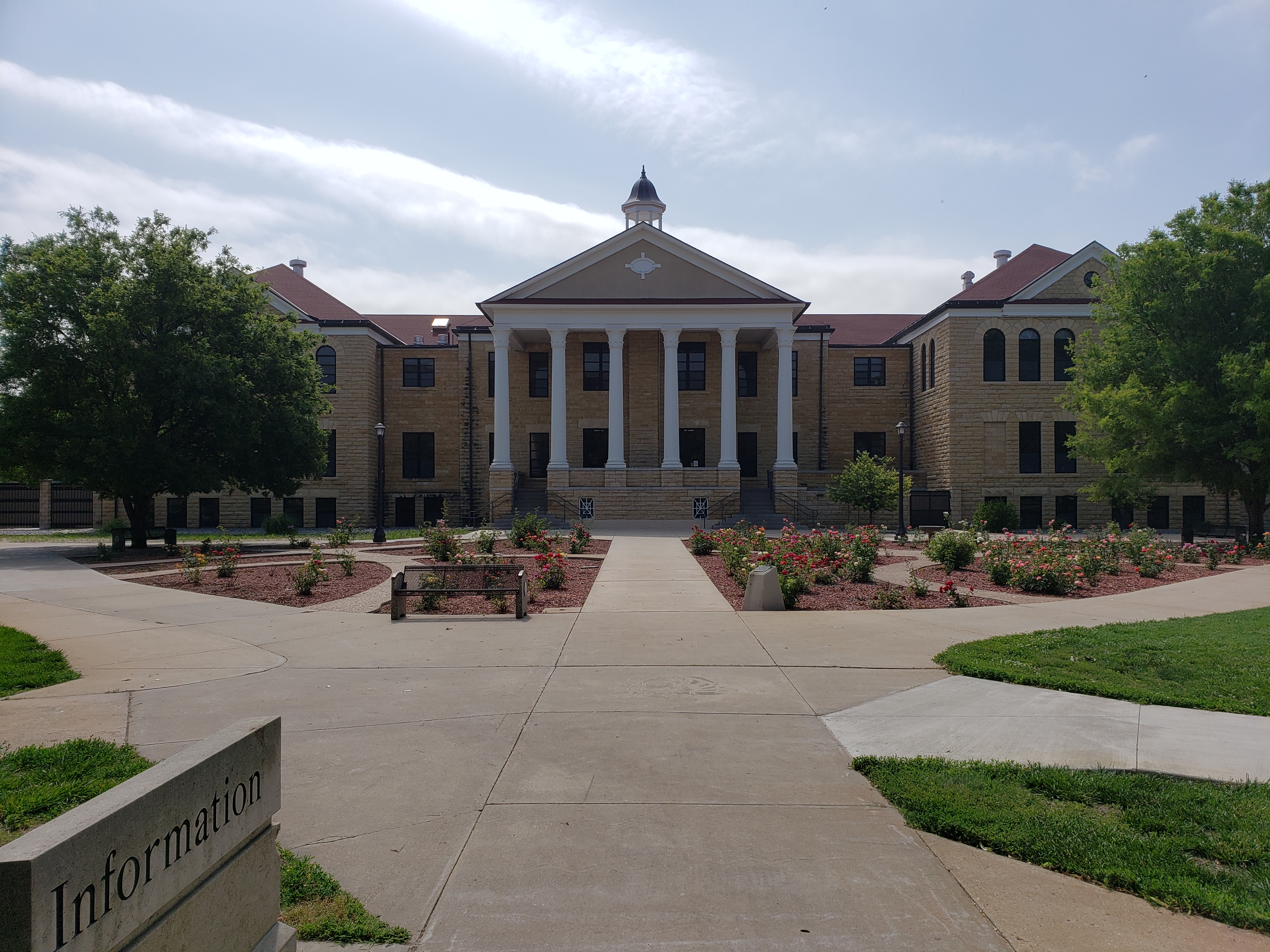
Pickens Hall

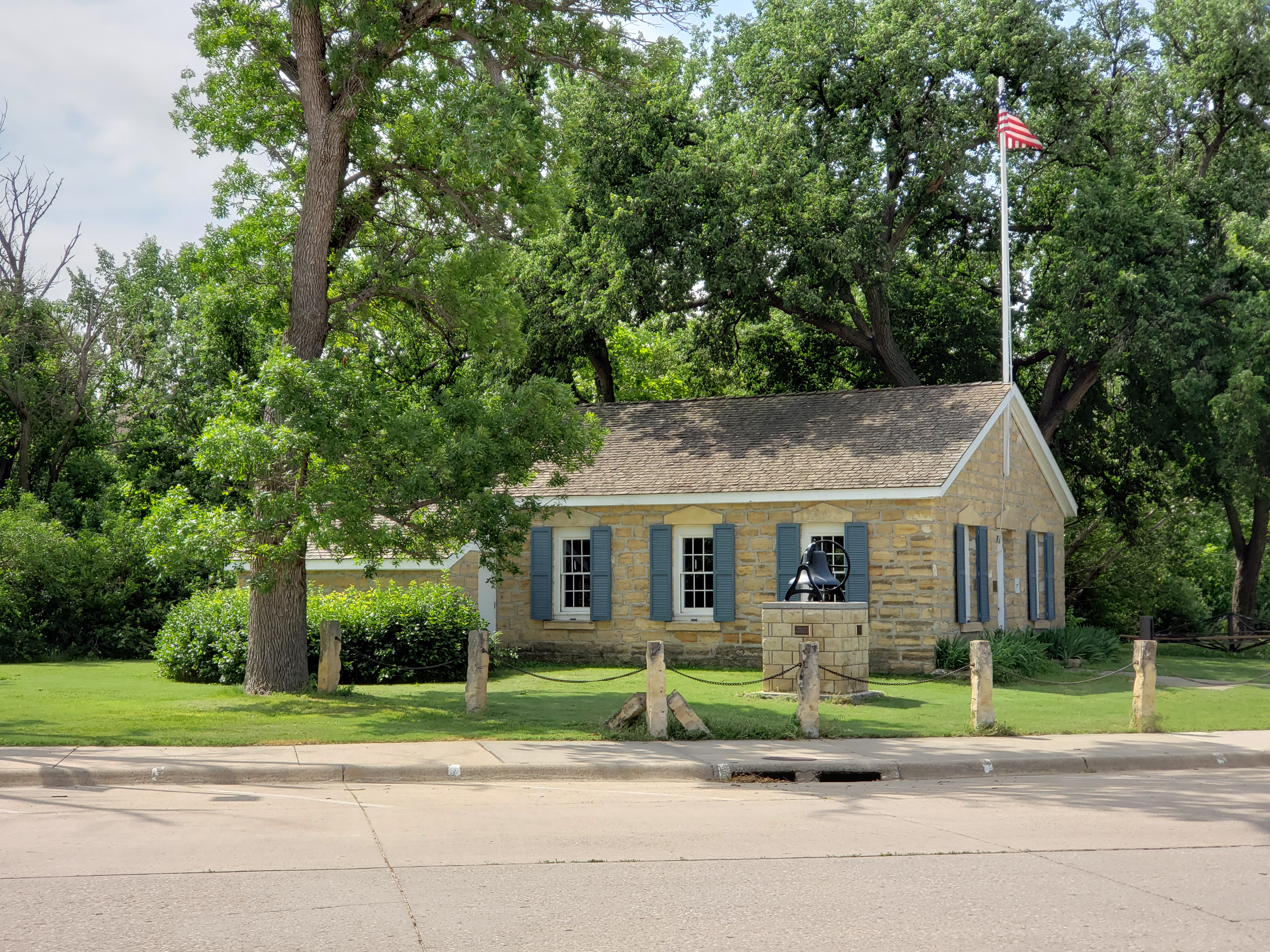
Plymouth Schoolhouse

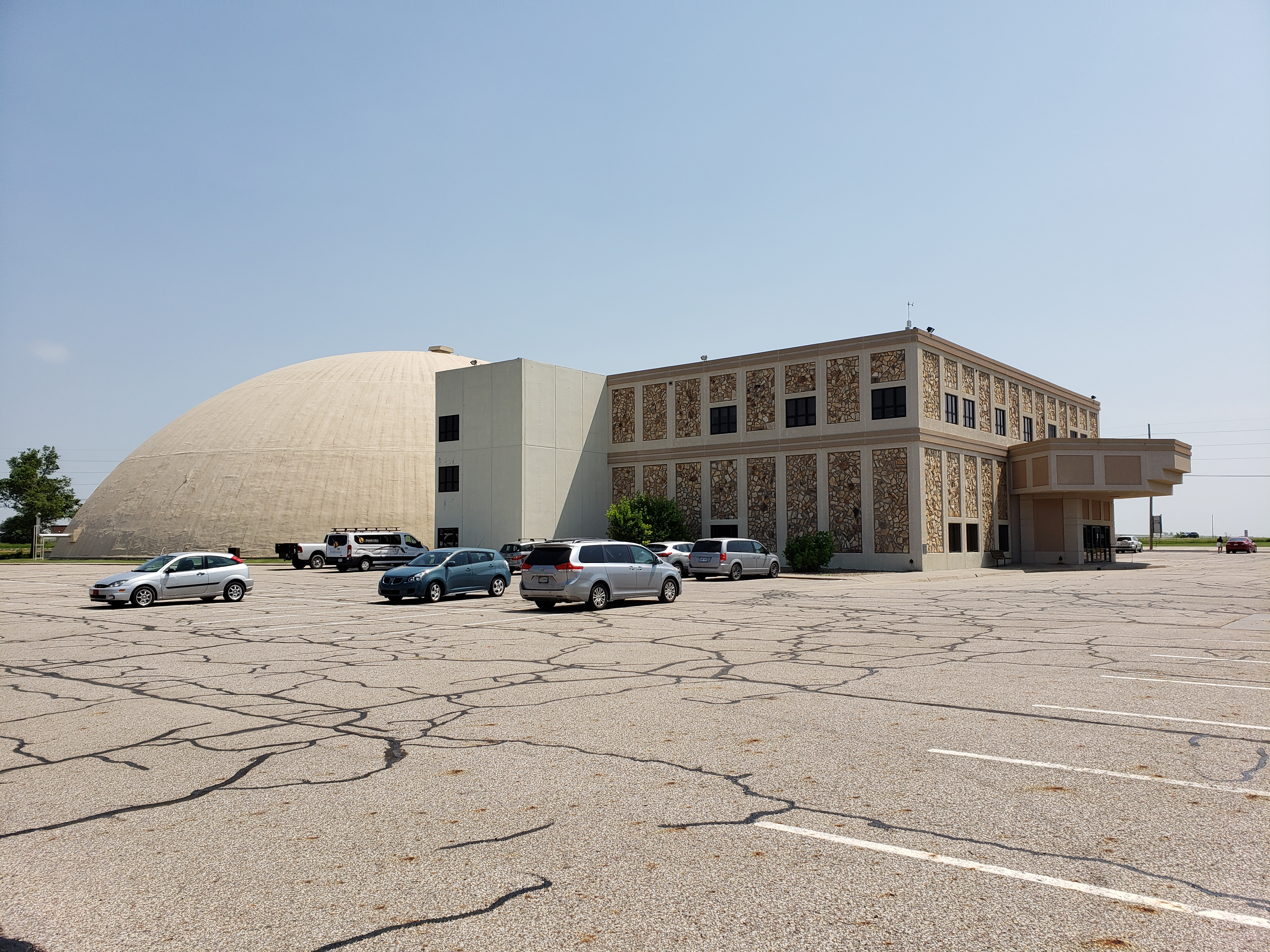
Sternberg Museum of Natural History

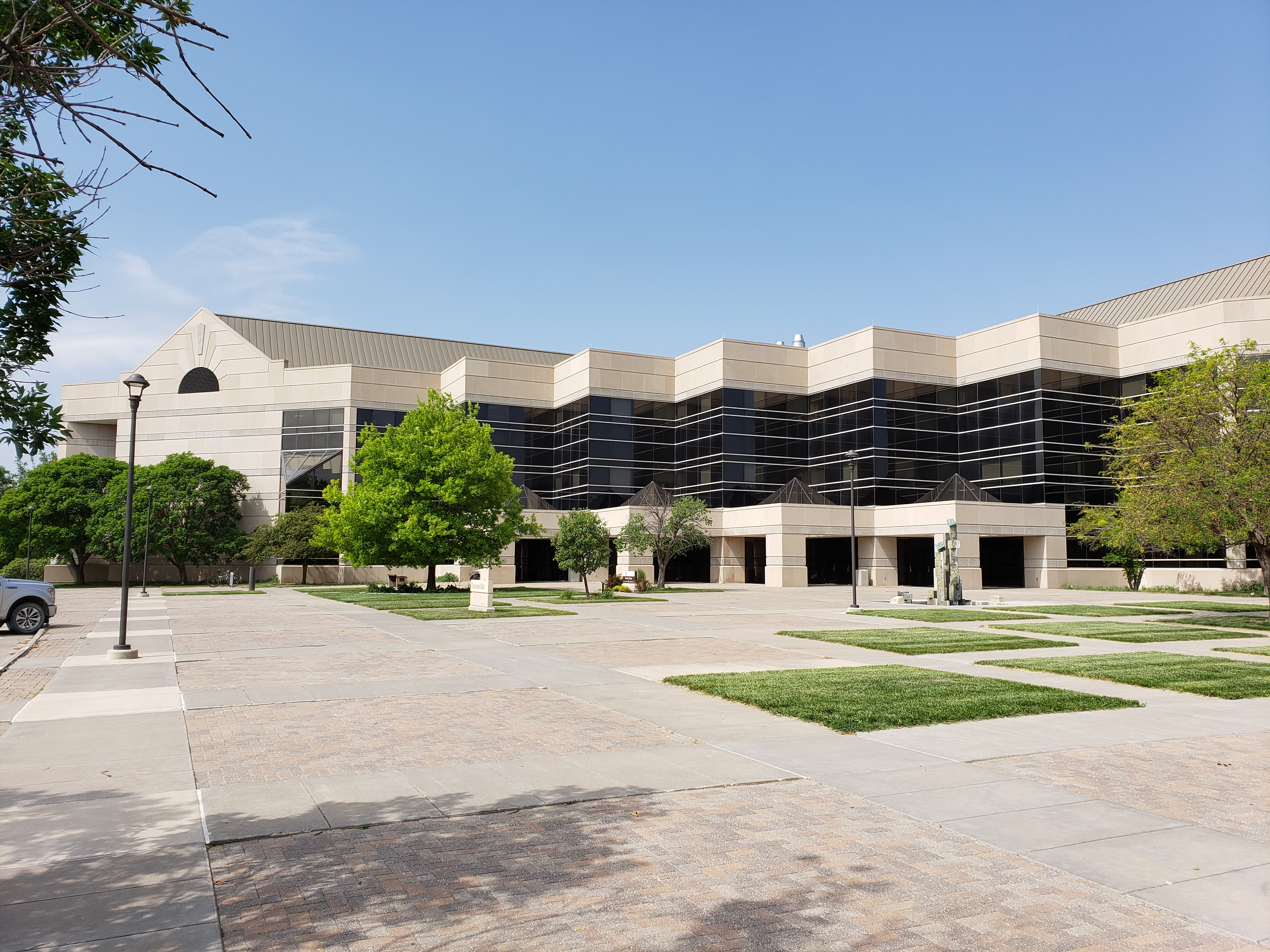
Tomanek Hall
