= Tisa Mason =

American Educator

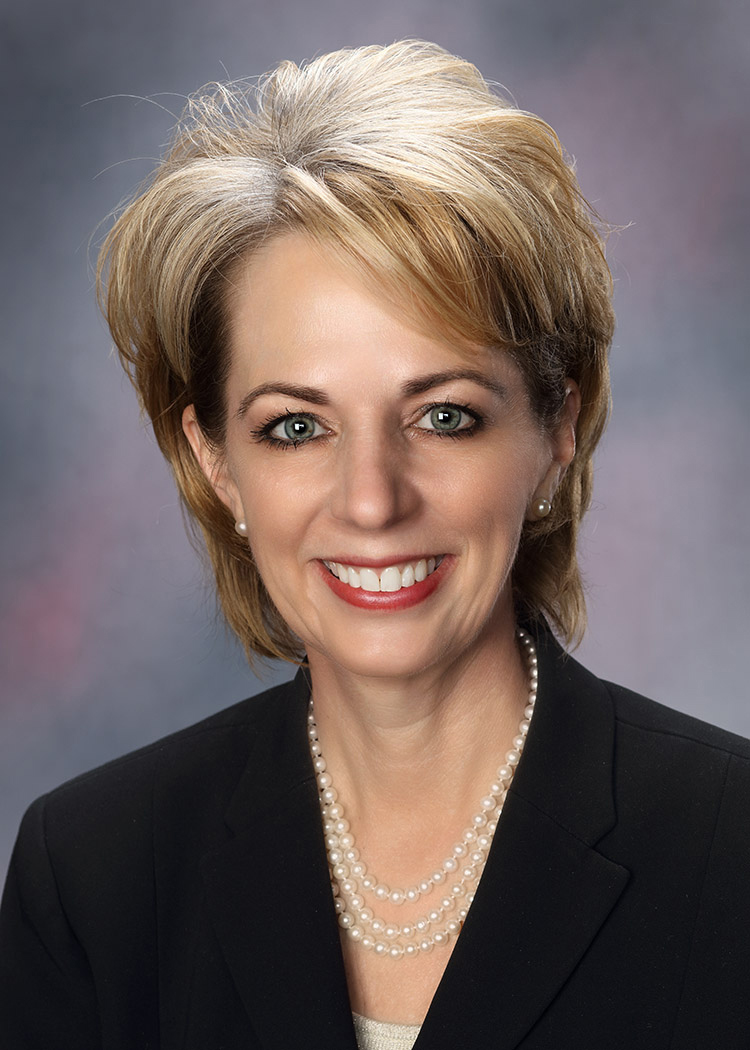

10th President of Fort Hays State University
- Incumbent
- Assumed office December 18, 2017
- Preceded by: Mirta Martin

13th President of Valley City State University
- In office December 15, 2014 – December 15, 2017
- Preceded by: Steven Shirley
- Succeeded by: Margaret Dahlberg

Personal details
- Born: Tisa A. Mayer; February 8, 1961 (age 65) Palmer, Massachusetts
- Spouse: Bill
- Education: Transylvania University (BA); Eastern Illinois University (MA); College of William and Mary (EdD)
- Profession: Professor
- Website: Office of the President

Tisa A. Mason (born February 8, 1961) is an American educator and the current president of Fort Hays State University. Prior to her presidency at Fort Hays State, Mason served as Valley City State University's president from December 15, 2014, to December 15, 2017. Mason served as Fort Hays State's vice president of student affairs from July 2008 to December 2014.

== Biography ==
=== Education ===
Born in Palmer, Massachusetts, Mason graduated from Classical High School in 1979 and went on to receive her bachelor's of arts with Omicron Delta Kappa honors from Transylvania University in 1983 majoring in sociology/anthropology. In 1984, Mason completed her master's degree at Eastern Illinois University, as well as her education doctorate from the College of William and Mary in 1992.

=== Career ===
After graduating from Transylvania University, Mason served as the assistant dean of students at Hanover College, a position she held from 1984 to 1986. From 1986 to 1994, Mason was served as the student life director and as an assistant professor at Christopher Newport University. Following an eight-year stint at CNU, Mason served as the executive director for Sigma Kappa, the national headquarters of her sorority from college. On July 1, 2004, Mason assumed the position as the University of Wisconsin–Whitewater's dean of student life, a position she held until June 2008. On July 1, 2008, Mason became the student affairs vice president at Fort Hays State University, a position she would hold for six years.

==== Valley City State University ====
On October 30, 2014, Mason was named Valley City State University's 13th president. While at VCSU, Mason was able to increase the enrollment numbers – setting a school record – and brought in more revenue into the budget. Mason left VCSU on December 15, 2017, as she was named the president of Fort Hays State University.
