= Manhattan Area Technical College =

Coordinates: 39°11′52″N 96°36′55″W

- Former names: Manhattan Area Vocational Technical School
- Type: Technical College
- Established: 1965
- President: James Genandt
- Students: 958 (Fall 2023)
- Location: Manhattan, Kansas, United States
- Colours: Maroon and Silver
- Website: manhattantech.edu

Manhattan Area Technical College is a public technical college in Manhattan, Kansas, United States. It was founded in 1965 and offers Associate of Applied Science degrees in 8 disciplines and technical certificate programs in several others. Manhattan Area Technical College is accredited through the Higher Learning Commission. The college's primary service area includes Geary, Riley, Clay, Marshall, Dickinson, and Pottawatomie Counties.

== History ==
Originally called Manhattan Area Vocational Technical School, MATC was established in 1965 by statute under the Kansas Board of Education. Classes were held on the campus of Manhattan High School until the current campus located at 3136 Dickens Ave was completed in 1967. Robert J. Edleston was hired as the college's first President and CEO.

The school was renamed Manhattan Area Technical Center in 1992 and again to the current name in 1996, after legislation passed in 1994 allowed vocational-technical schools to apply for recognition as colleges. In 1996, Kansas Governor Bill Graves signed into law Kansas House Bill 2606, which designated the school Manhattan Area Technical College. In 2004, MATC separated from the USD 383 and became an independent public institution.

In 2007, the school earned accreditation through the Higher Learning Commission.
