= Mirta Martin =

American educator

Mirta M. Martin

President of Ferrum College
- In office Dec. 2022 – Present

President of Fairmont State University
- In office Jan. 18, 2018 – Dec. 2022

Personal details
- Born: Havana, Cuba
- Spouse: John N. Martin Jr.
- Education: Duke University; University of Richmond; Virginia Commonwealth University
- Profession: Professor

Mirta Maria Martin (pronounced MEER-tah) (born June 18, 1960) is an American educator who is currently president of Ferrum College in Ferrum, Virginia. She was the president of Fairmont State University from 2018 to 2022 and the president of Fort Hays State University from 2014 to 2016. Prior to Fort Hays State, Martin served as the Dean of Virginia State University's Reginald F. Lewis School of Business, a position she held from August 1, 2009 until June 30, 2014.

== Biography ==
=== Education ===
Originally from Cuba, Martin attended Duke University, where she graduated in 1982 with her bachelor of science in psychology and political science. Ten years later in 1992, Martin received her master's degree from the University of Richmond, followed by her doctorate from Virginia Commonwealth University in 1996.

=== Early career ===
After graduating from Duke in 1982, Martin worked in banking where she eventually became the Senior Vice President of First Union National Bank of Virginia. After a little more than a decade in the banking industry, Martin became an associate professor of business at Averett University, where she served as the interim dean in 1995. In 2001, Martin left Averett to become the Executive Director of the Management Institute and associate professor and dean of management development at the E. Claiborne Robins School of Business. After a brief two years at the University of Richmond, Martin became John Tyler Community College's Special Assistant to the President and Executive Vice President and Executive Director of the Foundation for four years. In 2009, Martin became the Dean and Professor for management at Virginia State University's Reginald F. Lewis School of Business.

=== Fort Hays State University ===
On May 2, 2014, the Kansas Board of Regents announced Martin as Fort Hays State University's ninth president. Martin became the first female president in the university's history, as well as the first Hispanic president in the Regents system.

Under Martin’s administration, the financial condition of FHSU and its ability to administer annual operating and capital budgets were excellent as evidenced by its cash reserves, low tuition, and its capability to manage most capital projects with no debt. FHSU’s bond rating was upgraded during 2016 to Moody’s rating of A1 Stable, at a time when the state of Kansas and many of its institutions were being downgraded. Martin is also credited with a re-engineering plan that created the College of Science, Technology, and Mathematics (STeM); the Honors Program; and the first professional doctoral program - the Doctor of Nursing Practice. To serve the needs of the emerging Hispanic population in Western Kansas, Martin launched the Hispanic College Institute, a program she had previously created. Due to an aggressive enrollment management strategy, FHSU became the third largest university in the state with an all-time high enrollment of 14,658.

On November 23, 2016, Martin announced she was stepping down as president, but continued to serve Fort Hays State as the Consultant to the President until June 2017.

=== Fairmont State University ===
On October 19, 2017, Fairmont State University announced Martin as their next president, beginning January 1, 2018.

Fairmont State University President Dr. Mirta Martin received the WVNews.com’s Educator of the Year Award for 2019. Martin, who became president at Fairmont State in January 2018, helped turn the university’s financial situation around over an 18-month time frame, leading to the institution seeing a $5.3 million increase in its net position despite the $3.87 million deficit she inherited. As of June 30, 2022, Martin's leadership are heralded for the $20.5 million turnaround in finances, the 5.69 Composite Financial Index (up from 0.76 which she inherited). The University also has the largest days cash on hand. For her leadership, Martin was also named West Virginia's Wonder Woman in 2020. In 2021, she was highlighted by The PhD Program during Women's History Month. Martin's contract was terminated by a vote of the Board of Governors, effective July 18, 2022 link text

== Other work ==
While in Virginia, Martin served on various board including the Virginia State Board for Community Colleges and Virginia Latino Advisory Board, after being appointed by former Virginia governors, Bob McDonnell and Tim Kaine. Martin was also a recipient of the Presidential Volunteer Service Award, given by the President of the United States.
