= Emporia, Kansas =

City in Lyon County, Kansas, United States

- City and County seat
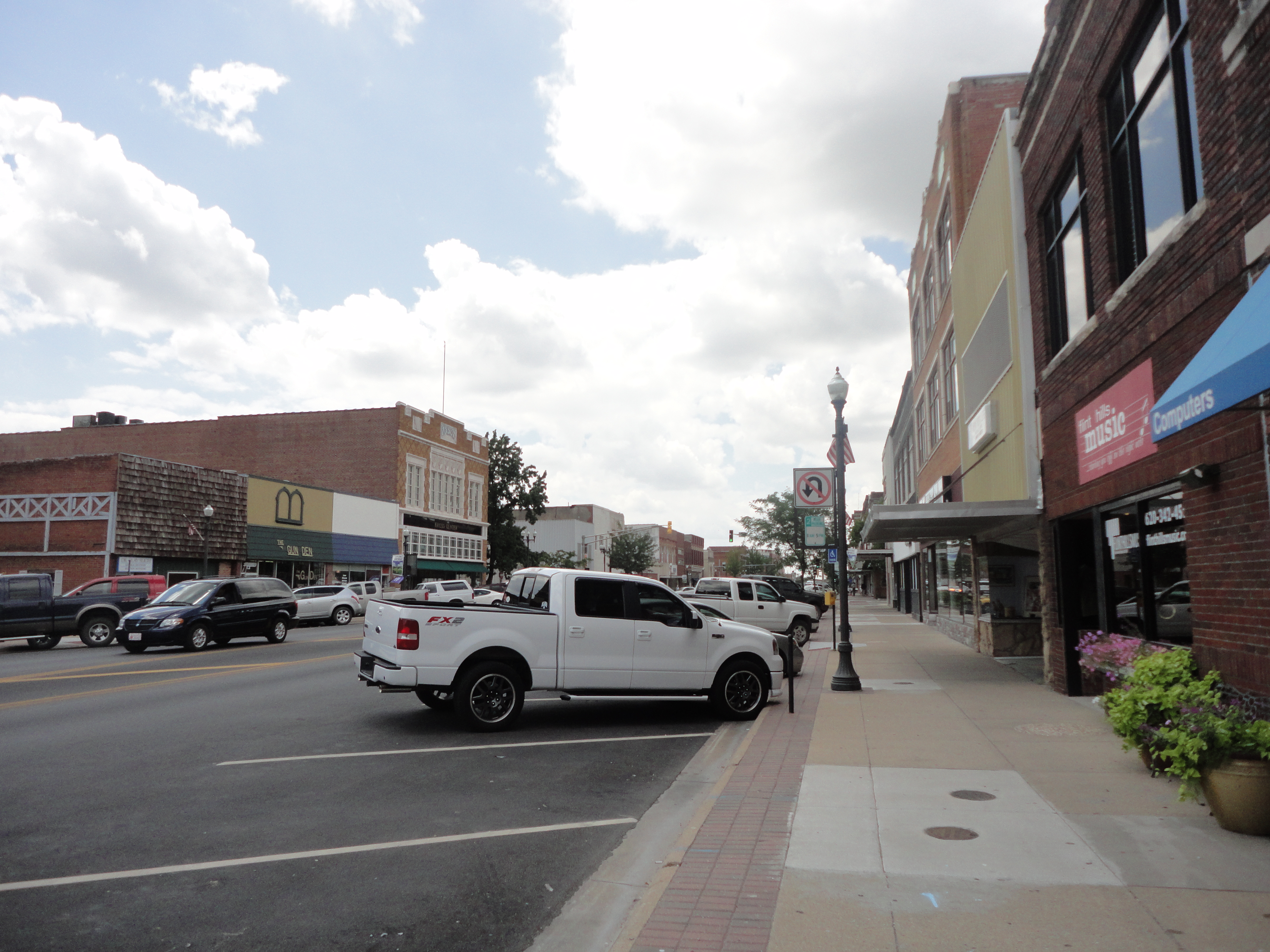
- Downtown Emporia (2012)

- Logo for City of Emporia

- Location of Emporia within Lyon County and Kansas

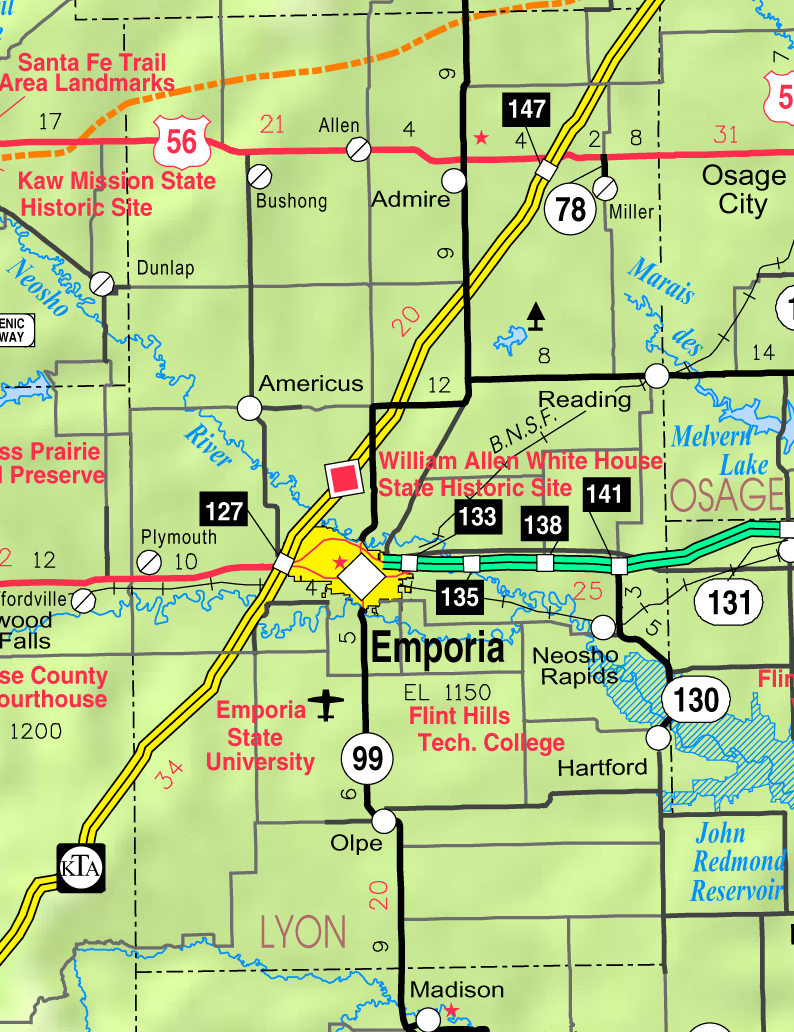
- KDOT map of Lyon County (legend)
- Coordinates: 38°24′14″N 96°11′34″W
- Country: United States
- State: Kansas
- County: Lyon
- Founded: 1857
- Incorporated: 1870

Government
  - Type: Commission-Manager
  - Mayor: Becky Smith
  - City Manager: Trey Cocking

Area
  - Total: 12.11 sq mi (31.37 km^{2})
  - Land: 12.00 sq mi (31.07 km^{2})
  - Water: 0.12 sq mi (0.30 km^{2}) 0.6%
- Elevation: 1,142 ft (348 m)

Population (2020)
  - Total: 24,139
  - Density: 2,012/sq mi (776.9/km^{2})
- Time zone: UTC-6 (CST)
  - Summer (DST): UTC-5 (CDT)
- ZIP Code: 66801
- Area code: 620
- FIPS code: 20-21275
- GNIS ID: 485571
- Website: emporiaks.gov

Emporia is a city in, as well as the county seat of, Lyon County, Kansas, United States. As of the 2020 census, the population of the city was 24,139. Emporia lies between Topeka and Wichita at the intersection of highways K-99, U.S. Route 50, Interstates 335 and 35 (Kansas Turnpike). It is home to Emporia State University and Flint Hills Technical College, and two annual sporting events: Unbound Gravel (gravel bicycle race) and Dynamic Discs Open (disc golf tournament).

== History ==
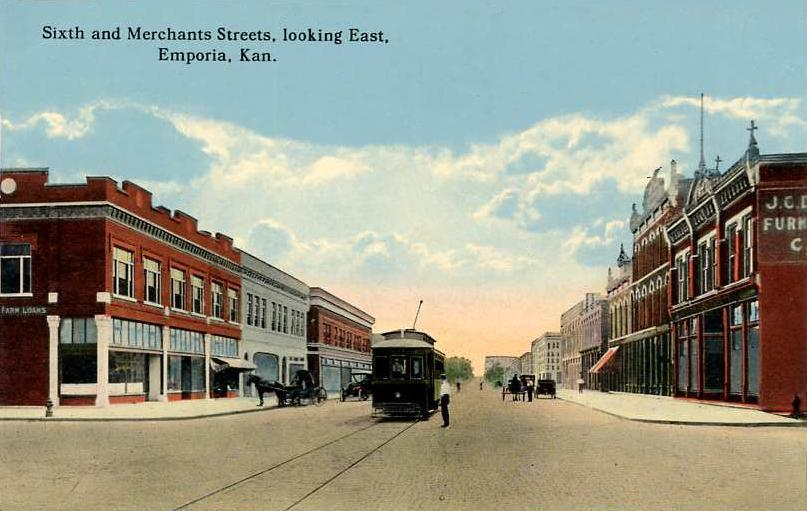
Sixth Avenue c. 1912

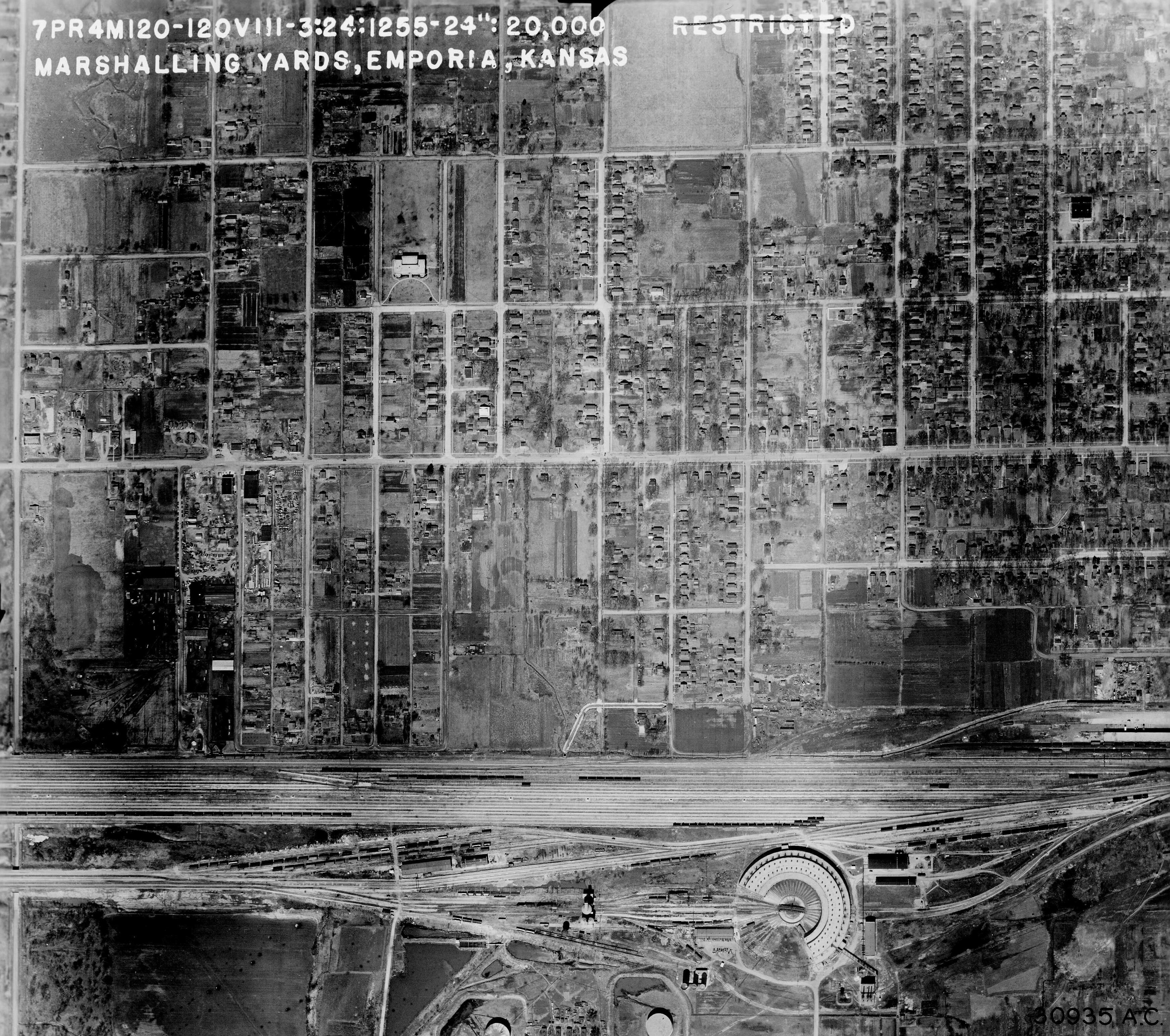
Aerial image of Emporia, 1944

Located on upland prairie, Emporia was founded in 1857, drawing its name from ancient Carthage, a place known in history as a prosperous center of commerce.

In 1864, the Union Pacific Railway, Southern Branch (later incorporated into the Missouri-Kansas-Texas Railroad) received land grants to build from Fort Riley to Emporia. The road eventually reached Emporia in 1869, becoming the first railroad to serve the burgeoning town. In July 1870, a second railroad, the Atchison, Topeka and Santa Fe Railway reached Emporia, and in the years following the American Civil War the city became a booming railroad hub. In 1888, railroad executive and educator John Byers Anderson donated his personal library to the College of Emporia to commemorate his 50th wedding anniversary, and his former mentee Andrew Carnegie donated additional funds to build a library in Anderson's honor (conditioned upon the new college paying off its mortgage).

In 1953, Emporia was the site of the first Veterans Day observance in the United States. At the urging of local cobbler Alvin J. King, U.S. Representative Edward Rees introduced legislation in The United States Congress to rename Armistice Day as Veterans Day. President Dwight D. Eisenhower signed the bill into law on October 8, 1954.

On June 8, 1974, an F4 tornado struck Emporia, killing 6 people, injuring 200, and causing $25 million in damages.

On March 6, 1988, an armed gunman walked into the Calvary Baptist Church during services and opened fire. Cheunphon Ji, the 29-year-old gunman, had no particular target, killing one person and injuring four others.

== Geography ==
Emporia is located in east-central Kansas. It lies along the Kansas Turnpike at its intersection with Interstate 35 and U.S. Highway 50, 108 miles (174 km) southwest of Kansas City, 58 miles (93 km) southwest of Topeka, and 87 miles (140 km) northeast of Wichita on the eastern edge of the Flint Hills. According to the United States Census Bureau, the city has a total area of 11.94 square miles (30.92 km^{2}), of which 11.83 square miles (30.64 km^{2}) is land and 0.11 square miles (0.28 km^{2}) is water. The Neosho River flows along the northern side of the city. The Cottonwood River, one of its tributaries, flows along the city's southern edge and of two large city parks, Peter Pan and Soden's Grove; the two rivers meet near the eastern boundary of Emporia and flow southeast to join the Arkansas River in Oklahoma.

=== Climate ===
According to the Köppen Climate Classification system, Emporia has a humid subtropical climate, abbreviated "Cfa" on climate maps. The hottest temperature recorded in Emporia was 116 °F (46.7 °C) on July 15, 1934, and August 14, 1936, while the coldest temperature recorded was −24 °F (−31.1 °C) on January 4, 1947.

Climate data for Emporia Municipal Airport, Kansas, 1991–2020 normals, extremes 1893–1954, 1979–present
Month	Jan	Feb	Mar	Apr	May	Jun	Jul	Aug	Sep	Oct	Nov	Dec	Year
Record high °F (°C)	76 (24)	84 (29)	93 (34)	95 (35)	100 (38)	112 (44)	116 (47)	116 (47)	108 (42)	96 (36)	86 (30)	77 (25)	116 (47)
Mean maximum °F (°C)	63.6 (17.6)	68.6 (20.3)	78.0 (25.6)	85.0 (29.4)	89.3 (31.8)	94.2 (34.6)	99.3 (37.4)	99.4 (37.4)	94.1 (34.5)	86.5 (30.3)	74.6 (23.7)	65.4 (18.6)	100.9 (38.3)
Mean daily maximum °F (°C)	41.3 (5.2)	46.5 (8.1)	57.4 (14.1)	67.3 (19.6)	75.9 (24.4)	85.0 (29.4)	90.0 (32.2)	89.2 (31.8)	80.8 (27.1)	69.2 (20.7)	55.9 (13.3)	44.3 (6.8)	66.9 (19.4)
Daily mean °F (°C)	31.0 (−0.6)	35.4 (1.9)	45.6 (7.6)	55.5 (13.1)	65.1 (18.4)	74.2 (23.4)	79.0 (26.1)	77.5 (25.3)	69.0 (20.6)	57.2 (14.0)	44.6 (7.0)	34.3 (1.3)	55.7 (13.2)
Mean daily minimum °F (°C)	20.7 (−6.3)	24.2 (−4.3)	33.7 (0.9)	43.6 (6.4)	54.2 (12.3)	63.5 (17.5)	68.0 (20.0)	65.8 (18.8)	57.2 (14.0)	45.2 (7.3)	33.3 (0.7)	24.2 (−4.3)	44.5 (6.9)
Mean minimum °F (°C)	2.3 (−16.5)	7.2 (−13.8)	15.3 (−9.3)	28.0 (−2.2)	40.6 (4.8)	52.8 (11.6)	59.1 (15.1)	56.9 (13.8)	43.0 (6.1)	30.0 (−1.1)	17.4 (−8.1)	8.3 (−13.2)	−1.1 (−18.4)
Record low °F (°C)	−24 (−31)	−23 (−31)	−7 (−22)	8 (−13)	25 (−4)	41 (5)	46 (8)	44 (7)	29 (−2)	15 (−9)	−1 (−18)	−22 (−30)	−24 (−31)
Average precipitation inches (mm)	0.78 (20)	1.31 (33)	2.12 (54)	3.84 (98)	5.01 (127)	4.53 (115)	3.90 (99)	3.86 (98)	3.25 (83)	3.06 (78)	1.85 (47)	1.30 (33)	34.81 (885)
Average precipitation days (≥ 0.01 in)	4.8	6.0	8.5	10.1	13.1	10.7	9.3	9.4	8.7	8.7	5.9	5.3	100.5
Source 1: NOAA
Source 2: National Weather Service

== Demographics ==
Historical population
Census	Pop.	Note	%±
1860	843		—
1870	2,168		157.2%
1880	4,631		113.6%
1890	7,551		63.1%
1900	8,223		8.9%
1910	9,058		10.2%
1920	11,273		24.5%
1930	14,067		24.8%
1940	13,188		−6.2%
1950	15,669		18.8%
1960	18,190		16.1%
1970	23,327		28.2%
1980	25,287		8.4%
1990	25,512		0.9%
2000	26,760		4.9%
2010	24,916		−6.9%
2020	24,139		−3.1%
2023 (est.)	24,105		−0.1%
U.S. Decennial Census; 2010-2020

Emporia is the principal city of the Emporia Micropolitan Statistical Area, which includes all of Lyon and Chase counties.

=== 2020 census ===
As of the 2020 census, Emporia had a population of 24,139, 9,876 households, and 5,468 families. The population density was 1,989.7 per square mile (768.2/km^{2}). There were 11,232 housing units at an average density of 925.8 per square mile (357.5/km^{2}); 12.1% of all housing units were vacant. The homeowner vacancy rate was 1.8% and the rental vacancy rate was 12.4%.

The median age was 32.3 years. 22.1% of residents were under the age of 18, 17.8% were from 18 to 24, 24.8% were from 25 to 44, 20.7% were from 45 to 64, and 14.6% were 65 years of age or older. For every 100 females there were 93.9 males, and for every 100 females age 18 and over there were 91.6 males age 18 and over.

Of the 9,876 households, 28.1% had children under the age of 18 living in them. Of all households, 38.2% were married-couple households, 23.0% were households with a male householder and no spouse or partner present, and 30.1% were households with a female householder and no spouse or partner present. About 34.6% of all households were made up of individuals, and 11.3% had someone living alone who was 65 years of age or older. The average household size was 2.3 and the average family size was 3.1.

The percent of residents with a bachelor's degree or higher was estimated to be 17.3% of the population.

99.7% of residents lived in urban areas, while 0.3% lived in rural areas.

Racial composition as of the 2020 census
Race	Number	Percent
White	16,392	67.9%
Hispanic or Latino (of any race)	6,828	28.3%
Some other race	3,624	15.0%
Two or more races	2,705	11.2%
Black or African American	630	2.6%
Asian	546	2.3%
American Indian and Alaska Native	226	0.9%
Native Hawaiian and Other Pacific Islander	16	0.1%

The 2016–2020 5-year American Community Survey estimates show that the median household income was $43,481 (with a margin of error of +/- $3,474) and the median family income was $65,264 (+/- $3,358). Males had a median income of $30,077 (+/- $2,136) versus $16,980 (+/- $1,362) for females. The median income for those above 16 years old was $22,911 (+/- $2,542). Approximately, 8.3% of families and 19.6% of the population were below the poverty line, including 16.7% of those under the age of 18 and 6.1% of those ages 65 or over.

=== 2010 census ===
As of the 2010 census, there were 24,916 people, 9,812 households, and 5,571 families residing in the city. The population density was 2,491.6 inhabitants per square mile (962.0/km^{2}). There were 11,352 housing units at an average density of 1,135.2 per square mile (438.3/km^{2}). The racial makeup of the city was 84% White, 3.2% African American, 3.1% Asian, 0.8% American Indian, 10.5% from some other race, and 3.1% from two or more races. 14.4% of the population was Hispanic or Latino of any race.

There were 9,812 households, of which 31.1% had children under the age of 18 living with them, 40.0% were married couples living together, 5.3% had a male householder with no wife present, 11.5% had a female householder with no husband present, and 43.2% were non-families. 32.1% of all households were made up of individuals, and 9.0% had someone living alone who was 65 years of age or older. The average household size was 2.39, and the average family size was 3.08.

In the city, the population was spread out, with 23.5% under the age of 18, 19.7% from 18 to 24, 24.5% from 25 to 44, 20.9% from 45 to 64, and 11.4% who were 65 years of age or older. The median age was 29.0 years. For every 100 females, there were 93.0 males. For every 100 females age 18 and over, there were 89.8 males age 18 and over.

The median income for a household in the city was $34,443, and the median income for a family was $47,500. Males had a median income of $32,873 versus $25,821 for females. The per capita income for the city was $17,485. About 12.0% of families and 22.2% of the population were below the poverty line, including 22.9% of those under age 18 and 11.9% of those age 65 or over.

== Economy ==
In addition to Emporia State University and other large public-sector employers such as the city and county governments, the public schools, and the county hospital, Emporia has several large private-sector employers. Previously, a Tyson Foods beef-packing plant employed more than 2,400 workers. Hostess Brands has a bakery in Emporia. Hopkins Manufacturing Corporation, founded in Emporia in 1953, by E.L. "Bud" Hopkins, and recognized in 2003 as the city's Large Employer of the Year, makes products for the automotive aftermarket. The Braum dairy store chain, based in Oklahoma City, originated in Emporia in 1952 under the name Peter Pan. Simmons Pet Food operates a multi-acre plant in Emporia that manufactures wet dog food.

On January 25, 2008, Tyson unexpectedly announced the layoff of 1,500 workers (more than 60 percent) by March 25, 2008. The company said it needed to move its slaughter operations closer to where the cattle are raised in western Kansas. As the city's largest employer for 37 years, the Tyson plant creates almost 10 percent of the local economy. In December 2024, Tyson announced to the 809 remaining employees that the plant in Emporia would be permanently ceasing operations on February 14, 2025. The company plans to continue their optimization strategy of consolidating operations in western Kansas.

== Education ==
=== Colleges and universities ===
Emporia is home to Emporia State University and Flint Hills Technical College. From 1882 to 1974, the private College of Emporia previously existed, and since the city had two colleges during its early years, it was sometimes called the "Athens of Kansas".

=== Primary and secondary ===
The community is served by Emporia USD 253 public school district, which has one high school (Emporia High School), one middle school, and six elementary schools, as well as an early childhood center.

The community is also served by two private schools: Emporia Christian School (preschool-8th grade) and Sacred Heart Catholic School (preschool-5th grade).

=== Library ===
The Emporia Public Library has been in operation since 1869 and is the oldest in the state of Kansas to remain in operation.

== Transportation ==
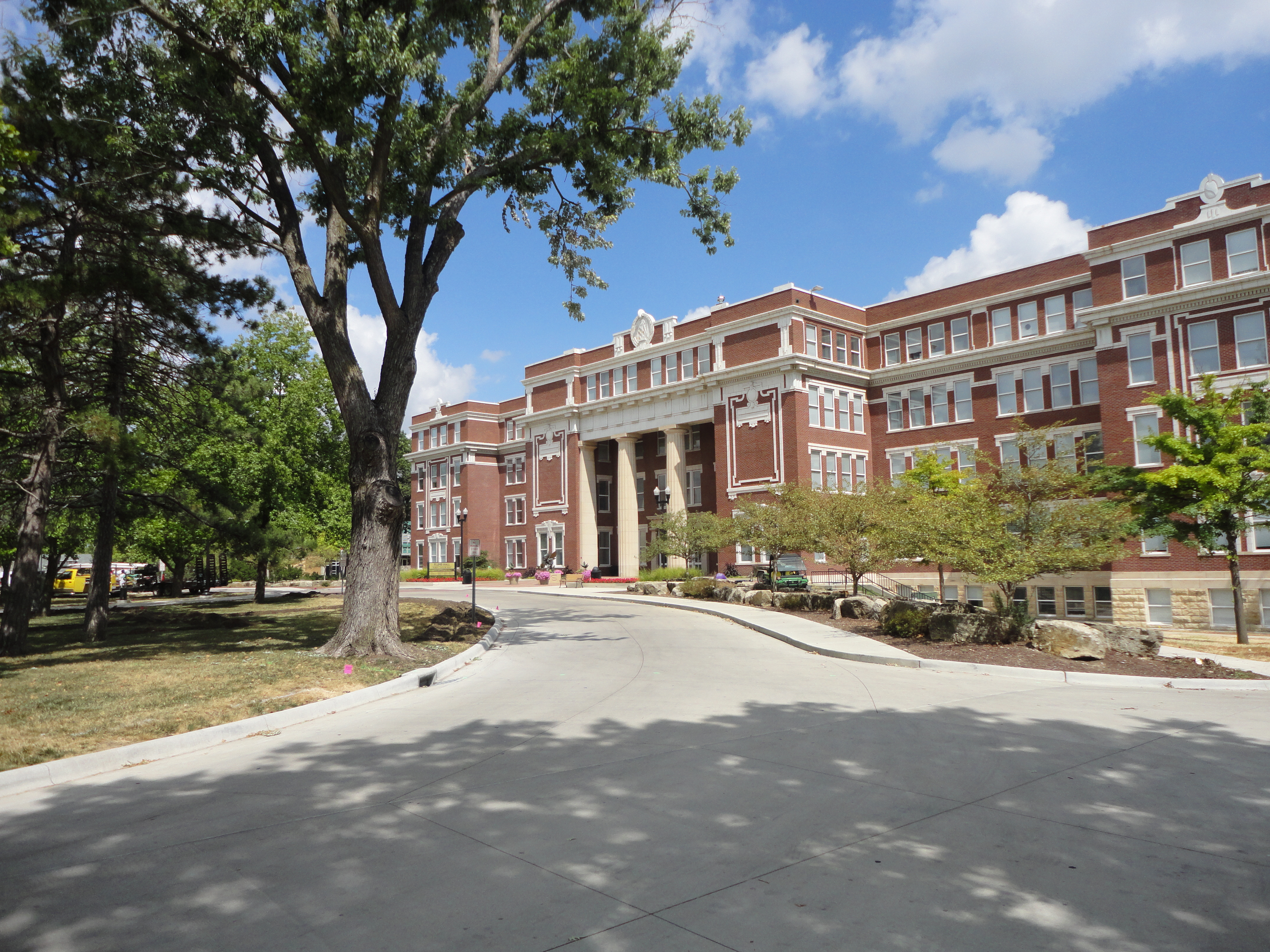
Plumb Administration Building & Albert Taylor Hall at Emporia State University (2012)

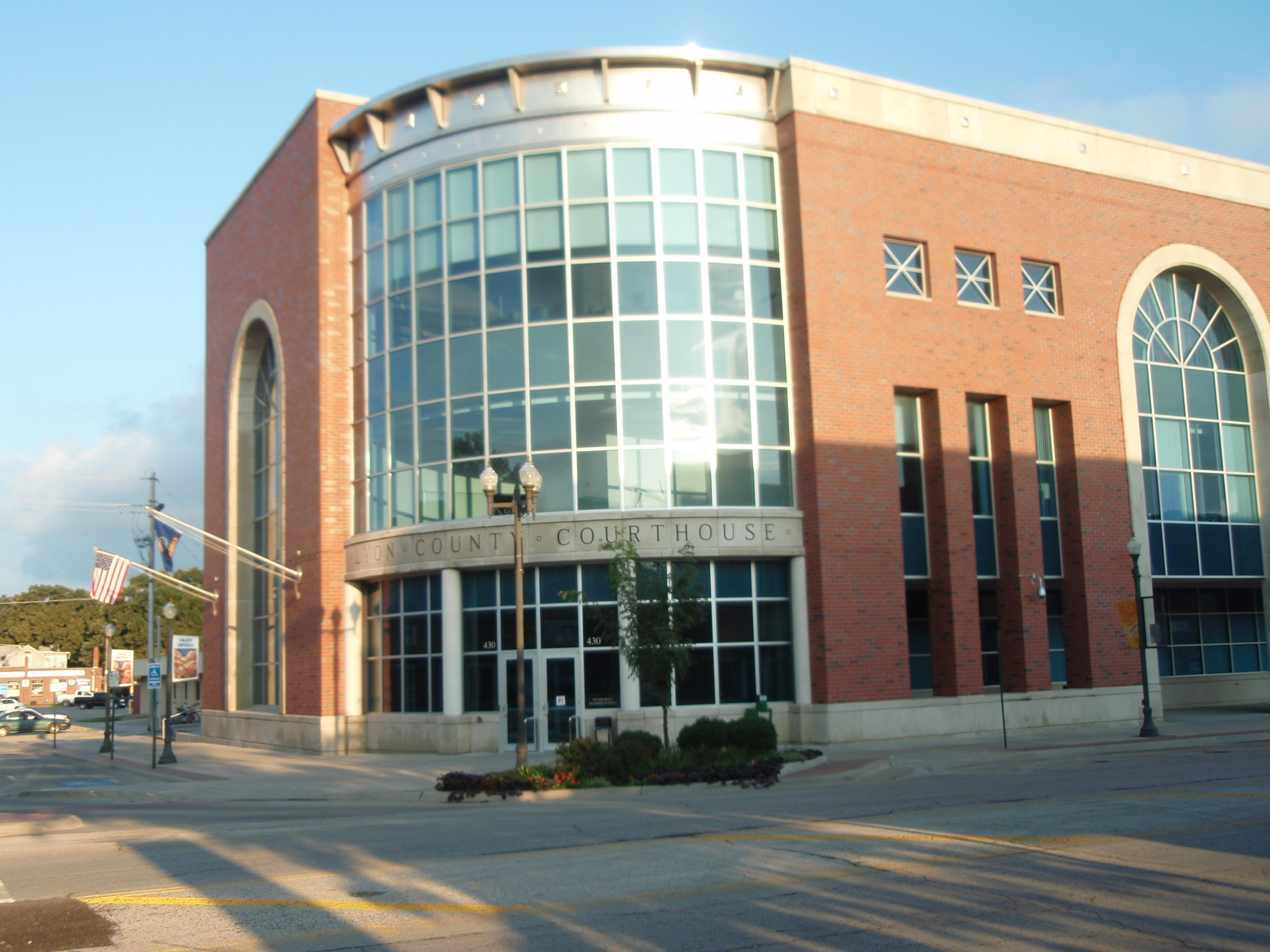
Lyon County courthouse (2009)

=== Air ===
The city is served by the Emporia Municipal Airport.

=== Bus ===
Bus service within the city is provided by LCAT, or Lyon County Area Transportation. The agency provides demand and deviated fixed-route bus services within the city of Emporia. Lyon County. The buses are a service of Lyon County, with significant support coming from the Kansas Department of Transportation.

=== Highway ===
Emporia is served by the following highways: I-35, I-335, Kansas Turnpike, US-50, K-99.

=== Train ===
The former Southern Transcon main line of BNSF Railway (ex-Santa Fe) passes east–west through Emporia. A yard is located in Emporia.

The city was served by Santa Fe passenger trains until the creation of Amtrak in 1971. The daily Southwest Chief served the city from 1971 to 1997. Service to Emporia station was eliminated in 1997, two years before a fire destroyed the 1884-built station. In 2014, local efforts were started to bring back the station. As of 2018, the future of revitalized service and a new station is still uncertain.

== Media ==
The Emporia Gazette is the city's main newspaper, published six days a week. The Gazette also publishes a Spanish language monthly paper, La Voz. Emporia State University publishes a bi-weekly student newspaper, the Emporia State University Bulletin.

Emporia is a center of broadcast media for east-central Kansas. One AM radio station and ten FM radio stations are licensed to and/or broadcast from the city. Emporia is in the Topeka, Kansas television market, and one television station, a translator of the Fox affiliate in Topeka, broadcasts from the city.

== Culture ==
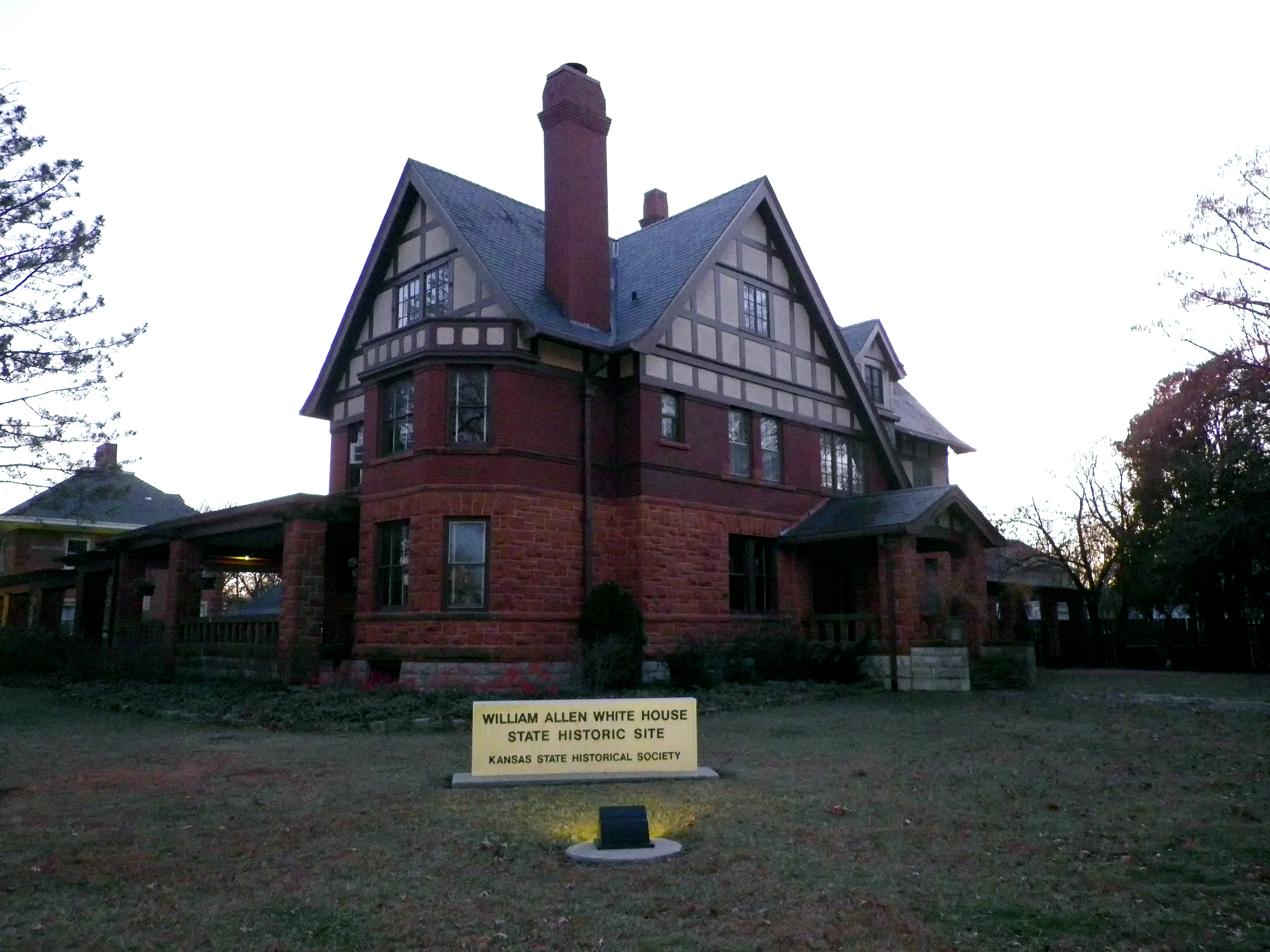
William Allen White House (2009)

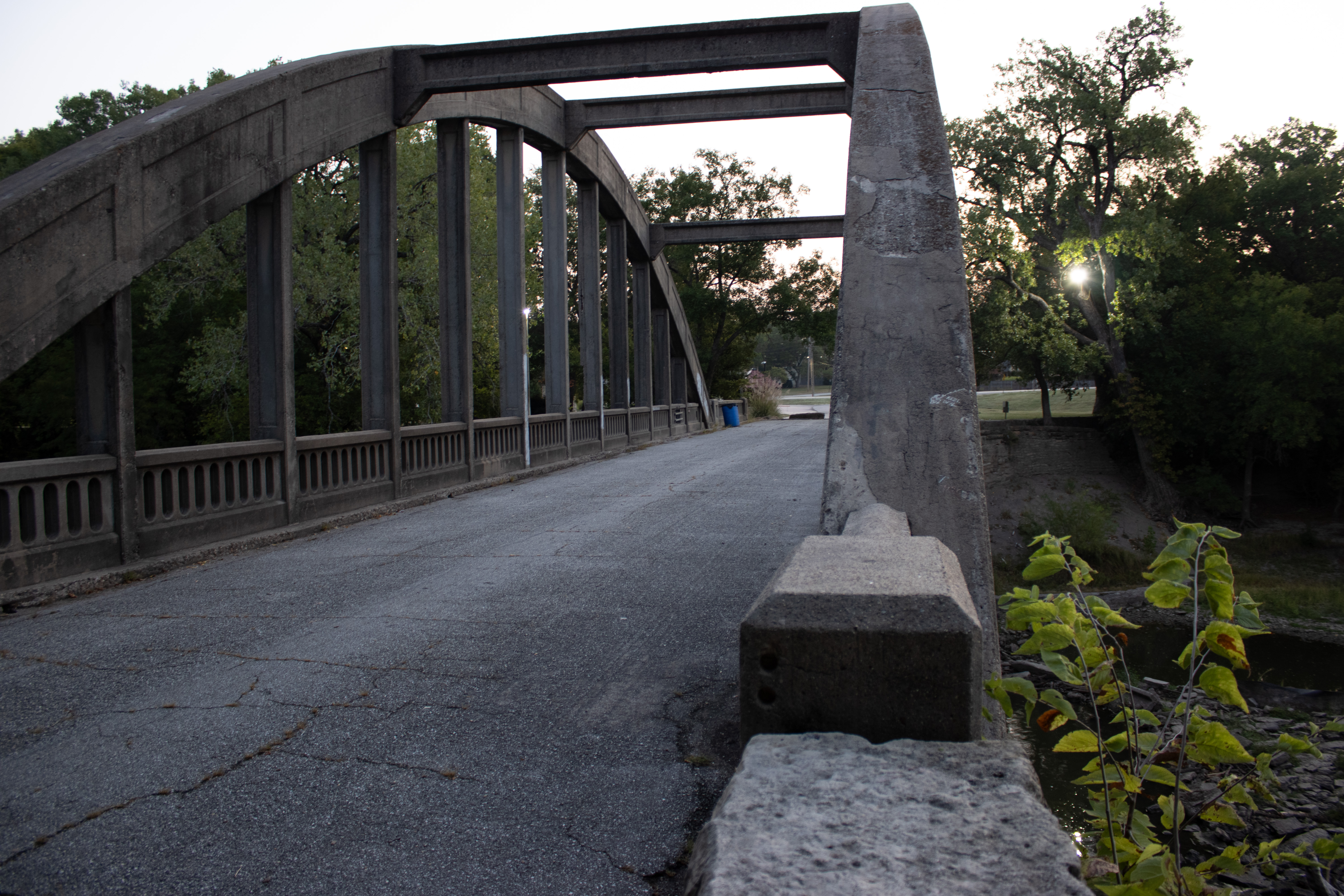
Soden's Grove Bridge (Marsh Arch Bridge)

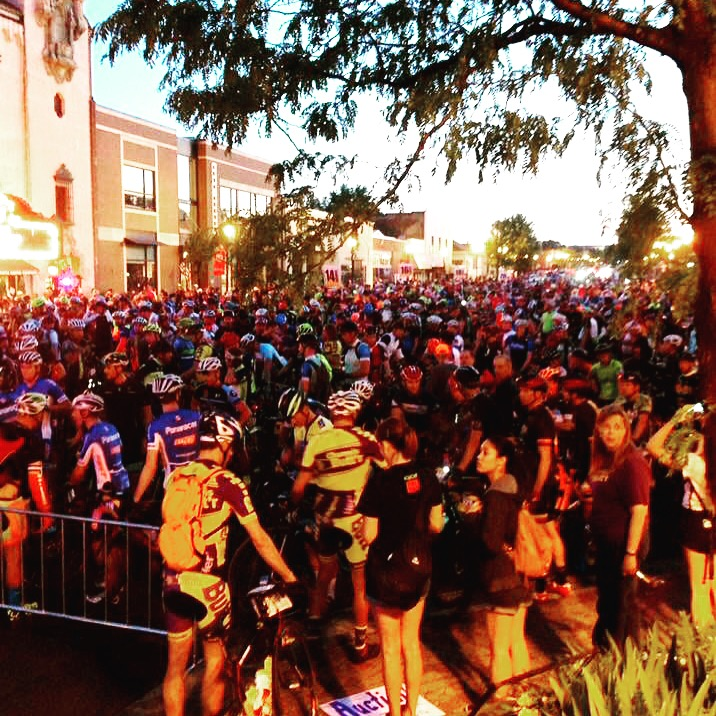
Waiting for Dirty Kanza bike race to start at sunrise in Emporia

=== Points of interest ===
Emporia has 14 structures on the National Register of Historic Places. They are the Old Emporia Public Library, the Finney (Warren Wesley) House, the Granada Theater (also known as the Fox Theater), the Harris-Borman House, the Howe (Richard) House, the Keebler-Stone House, the Kress Building, the Mason (Walt) House, the Anderson Carnegie Memorial Library, the Plumb (Mrs. Preston B.) House, the Soden's Grove Bridge (also known as the 'Marsh Arch Bridge), the Soden (Hallie B.) House, the William Allen White House (also known as Red Rocks), and the Col. Harrison C. and Susan Cross House. There is also an authentic one-room school house located on the Emporia State University campus (near Merchant Street) that is available for tours through the ESU Teachers College and The National Teachers Hall of Fame.

At the Emporia service area of the Kansas Turnpike is a Kansas Historical Marker named Emporia - Home of William Allen White.

=== Events ===
- "Unbound Gravel" (formerly Dirty Kanza) is a gravel bicycle race through the Flint Hills, starting and ending in Emporia. There are race events for 25, 50, 100, 200, 350 miles. It is held every first weekend after Memorial Day.
- "Dynamic Discs Open" is one of the largest disc golf tournaments.
- "The Taste" gives people the chance to visit with wineries, breweries and distilleries from all across Kansas and to taste their products
- "Great American Market" is a large market in downtown Emporia held on the second Saturday each September – vendors of antiques, collectibles, artwork, crafts, and food.

=== In popular culture ===
The 1987 CBS miniseries Murder Ordained was filmed in Emporia. It dramatized an actual event in Emporia involving the 1983 death of Sandra Bird.

== Notable people ==
Notable individuals who were born in and/or have lived in Emporia include actor R. Lee Ermey, journalist William Allen White, college basketball coach Dean Smith, and circus performer/tattoo artist Maud Wagner.

== See also ==
- June 1974 Great Plains tornado outbreak
- Great Flood of 1951
