= Kansas Business Hall of Fame =

Hall of fame recognizing business figures in Kansas, U.S.

- Established: 1988
- Location: Cremer Hall, Emporia State University School of Business and Technology, Emporia, Kansas, U.S.
- Coordinates: 38°24′56″N 96°10′52″W
- Type: Hall of fame
- Website: www.ksbhf.org

The Kansas Business Hall of Fame (KBHF) recognizes business leaders who have contributed to the economic growth of the state of Kansas. It was established in 1988 by the Emporia State University School of Business, where it remains housed on the second floor of Cremer Hall.

== History ==
The KBHF was established by the School of Business at Emporia State University in 1988 to recognize Kansas business leaders and create awareness of the state's history of business leadership.

The first inductees to the KBHF in 1989 were Olive Ann Beech, co-founder of Beech Aircraft; Cyrus K. Holliday, a railroad executive and one of the founders of Topeka; and Bernhard Warkentin, who introduced Turkey red wheat to Kansas. The induction ceremony was held on February 7, 1989, as part of a meeting of the Kansas Chamber of Commerce and Industry at the Ramada Inn in Topeka.

In 2019, the Kansas Department of Commerce faced criticism over the criteria for its Kansas Job Creation Program Fund awards, including $80,000 given to the KBHF in 2018, which were used as matching dollars to build a new facility.

== Inductees ==
Each year, the KBHF inducts one historical business figure and one contemporary leader.

The Historic Heritage Award is given to significant figures who have contributed to Kansas business, and the Contemporary Honors Award is awarded to those who display outstanding leadership in the contemporary business of Kansas, or a native Kansan who has earned national recognition. The KBHF also has the ability to give special awards to Kansans for unusual service to businesses.

=== Notable historical inductees ===
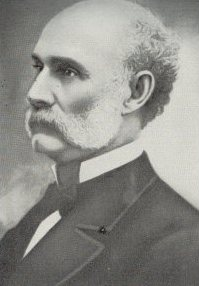
Cyrus K. Holliday

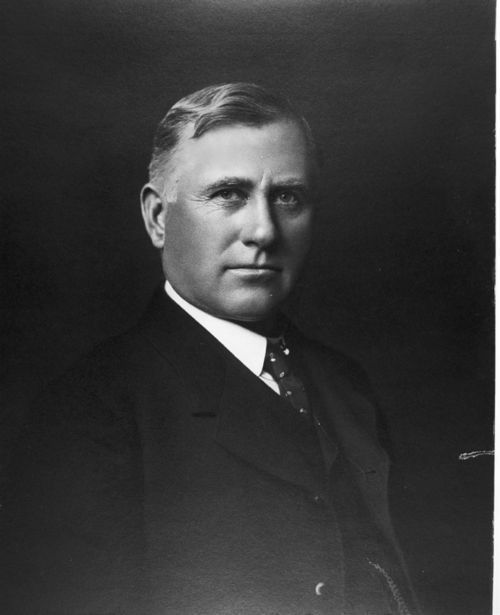
Bernhard Warkentin

The first two historical honorees of the KBHF in 1989

Nominees for the Historic Heritage Award are solicited from the general Kansas business community, and recipients must have added to the growth of Kansas, been deceased for at least ten years, and be approved by a majority of KBHF board members.

The following people have been inducted as historical figures.

- Cyrus K. Holliday (1989)
- William Coffin Coleman (1990)
- Dane G. Hansen (1990)
- Walter Chrysler (1991)
- Arthur Capper (1991)
- Clyde Cessna (1992)
- Fred C. Koch (1992)
- Kenneth A. Spencer (1995)
- Warren A. Bechtel (1997)
- Lloyd Stearman (1999)
- Alva Lease Duckwall (2000)
- Cleyson L. "C. L." Brown (2001)
- Clara and Russell Stover (2003)
- William Powell Lear (2004)
- William Allen White (2006)
- Fred Harvey (2008)
- Joseph G. McCoy (2011)
- Dwane Wallace (2012)
- William B. Strang (2014)
- Georgia Neese Clark Gray (2016)
- Henry David Lee (2019)
- Walter H. Beech (2020)
- Junius George Groves (2021)

For example, Clara Stover and her husband Russell founded Russell Stover Candies in 1923; they were inducted into the KBHF in 2003 and the company was sold in 2014 to Lindt for $1.6 billion.

Notably, this list also includes the founders of Chrysler (Walter Chrysler), Coleman (William Coffin Coleman), and the Sprint Corporation (C. L. Brown).

=== Contemporary inductees ===
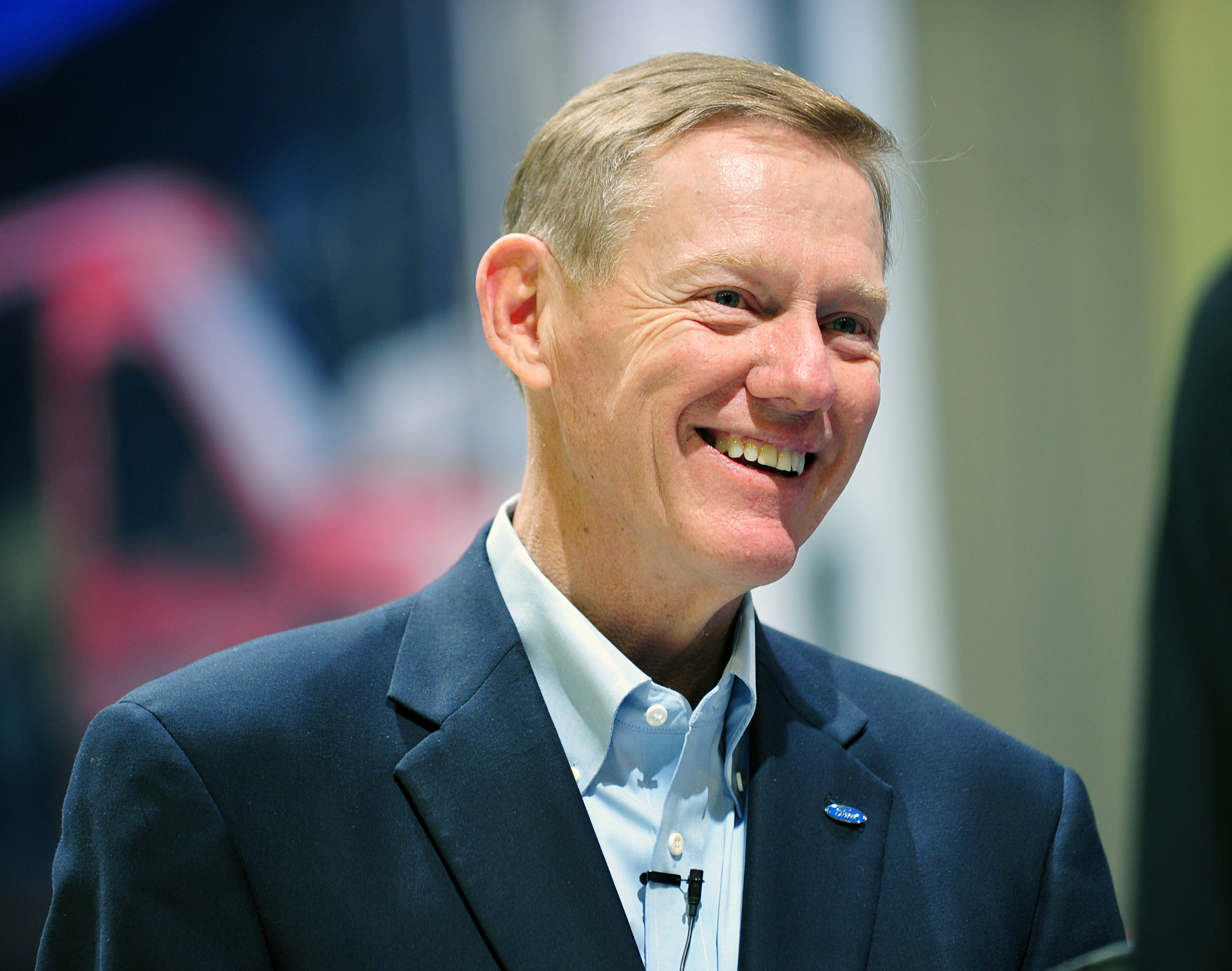
Alan Mulally, an aerospace engineer and the KBHF's 2011 contemporary inductee

Nominations for the Contemporary Honors Award come from the general business community. Recipients must be contemporary business leaders of Kansas and approved by a majority of KBHF board members. Nominees do not need to live in Kansas, but must display outstanding leadership and business excellence in Kansas.

These people have been inducted as contemporary business figures:

- Olive Ann (Mellor) Beech (1989)
- Fred Bramlage (1990)
- Ray E. Dillon (1991)
- Donald J. Hall (1992)
- Oscar S. Stauffer (1994)
- Harry Darby (1996)
- Charles G. Koch (1997)
- Philip Anschutz (2000)
- Richard K. "Dick" Davidson (2001)
- Dan and Frank Carney (2003)
- Robert J. Eaton (2005)
- Lyle E. Yost (2006)
- Roy Applequist (2010)
- Alan Mulally (2011)
- Greg Brenneman (2012)
- David Dillon (2014)
- Gary Burrell and Min Kao (2015)
- Bill Kurtis (2018)
- H. Lee Scott Jr. (2019)
- Carl Ice (2023)

As an example, the Carney brothers founded Pizza Hut in 1958 from their first outfit in Wichita, Kansas. They were honored in the KBHF in 2003 and the chain is now international.

== Board of directors ==
The KBHF board of directors is composed of representatives of the following:

- Kansas Secretary of Commerce
- President/CEO of the Kansas Chamber of Commerce
- Deans of the business programs from Kansas Board of Regents member institutions
- The business community
- Government officials
- Others necessary to "further the work of the Kansas Business Hall of Fame"

Members of the board are expected to contribute monetary donations to the KBHF annually, with contributions each year due by November 1. The board meets a minimum of two times per year, and the KBHF bylaws encourage in-person or virtual attendance at least once per year. Members are elected for a four-year term and are eligible for re-election.

== Essay contest ==
The KBHF holds an annual essay-writing contest open to high school students in grades 9–12, including home-schooled students. The contest requires each contestant to research one KBHF inductee who inspires them and write an essay of 500–1000 words. Four winners each receive a $500 prize, which is donated by the Kansas Chamber of Commerce.
