= Dane Hansen =

American businessman (1883–1965)

- Born: Dane Gray Hansen; January 6, 1883; Logan, Kansas, United States
- Died: January 6, 1965 (aged 82); Norton, Kansas, United States
- Monuments: Dane G. Hansen Museum and Plaza
- Political party: Republican
- Awards: Kansas Business Hall of Fame Historic Heritage Award

Dane Gray Hansen (January 6, 1883 – January 6, 1965) was an American businessman and political figure from Logan, Kansas.

== Family and personal life ==
In 1872, Hansen's father, Peter, emigrated from Denmark and married Alpha Gray. She gave birth to Hansen in Logan, and growing up, he assisted his family with their general store, lumberyard, Hereford cattle breeding, and ranching. He was one of six children, two of whom died as children.

Hansen had a slightly unusual sleep pattern; he would sleep until around 10 or 11 a.m., go to work at noon, and work until 2 or 3 a.m.

After high school, Hansen studied business for one year before returning home to work for his family's general store again.

== Entrepreneurial ventures ==
When the United States entered World War I, Hansen began purchasing mules from farmers in northwestern Kansas to sell to the United States Army. With the end of the war in 1918, Hansen had around 100 extra mules. (Note: The number of mules Hansen was left with is disputed; the Kansas Business Hall of Fame states that he had "nearly one hundred mules" while K-State Research and Extension mentions he had "more than 100 mules.") He used these in establishing a road construction business, which became Logan's most significant industry.

In 1941, oil was discovered near Logan, and Hansen invested in oil exploration, making him one of the largest oil producers in the state. He was the Kansas Independent Oil and Gas Association director and vice president and the Kansas Contractors Association Pension Trust Plan chairman.

== Political involvement ==
Hansen was, at one point, the mayor of Logan, which was an unpaid position. He was known for his desire to only work in politics for free due to his patriotism. He was also involved in the affairs of the Republican Party, attending every Republican National Convention for a 40-year period.

In 1954 and 1955, as former president Dwight D. Eisenhower's personal friend, Hansen served on the Study Committee on Federal Aid to Highways, which was established by the Commission on Intergovernmental Relations. He also served as the vice president of the Eisenhower Foundation board of trustees.

== Death and legacy ==
Hansen died on January 6, 1965—his 82nd birthday—at a hospital in Norton, Kansas, following a year-long illness. He was survived by his sister, Kate I. Hansen.

In 1990, Hansen was posthumously inducted as a historical honoree in the Kansas Business Hall of Fame.

Before his death, Hansen awarded college scholarships to graduates from Logan High School and donated 270 acres (110 ha) of land on the Kirwin Reservoir for the Boy Scouts of America to build the Dane G. Hansen Boy Scout Camp. He left $9 million to start the Dane G. Hansen Foundation, which continues to fund similar projects in his honor. The foundation memorialized Hansen and his family in the Dane G. Hansen Museum and Plaza, and they continue to fund scholarships and grants for people in northwest Kansas. In 2015, the foundation had over $388 million in assets and gave away over $16 million.
