= Whitman's =

American chocolate brand

- Type: Subsidiary of Russell Stover Candies
- Founded: Philadelphia, Pennsylvania, U.S. (1842)
- Founder: Stephen F. Whitman
- Headquarters: Kansas City, Missouri, U.S.
- Products: Chocolate Confections
- Owner: Lindt & Sprüngli
- Parent: Russell Stover Candies
- Website: www.russellstover.com

Whitman's is one of the largest and oldest brands of boxed chocolates in the United States. Whitman's confections have been produced since 1842, originally by Stephen Whitman in Philadelphia and currently by Kansas City, Missouri-based Russell Stover Candies.

== History ==
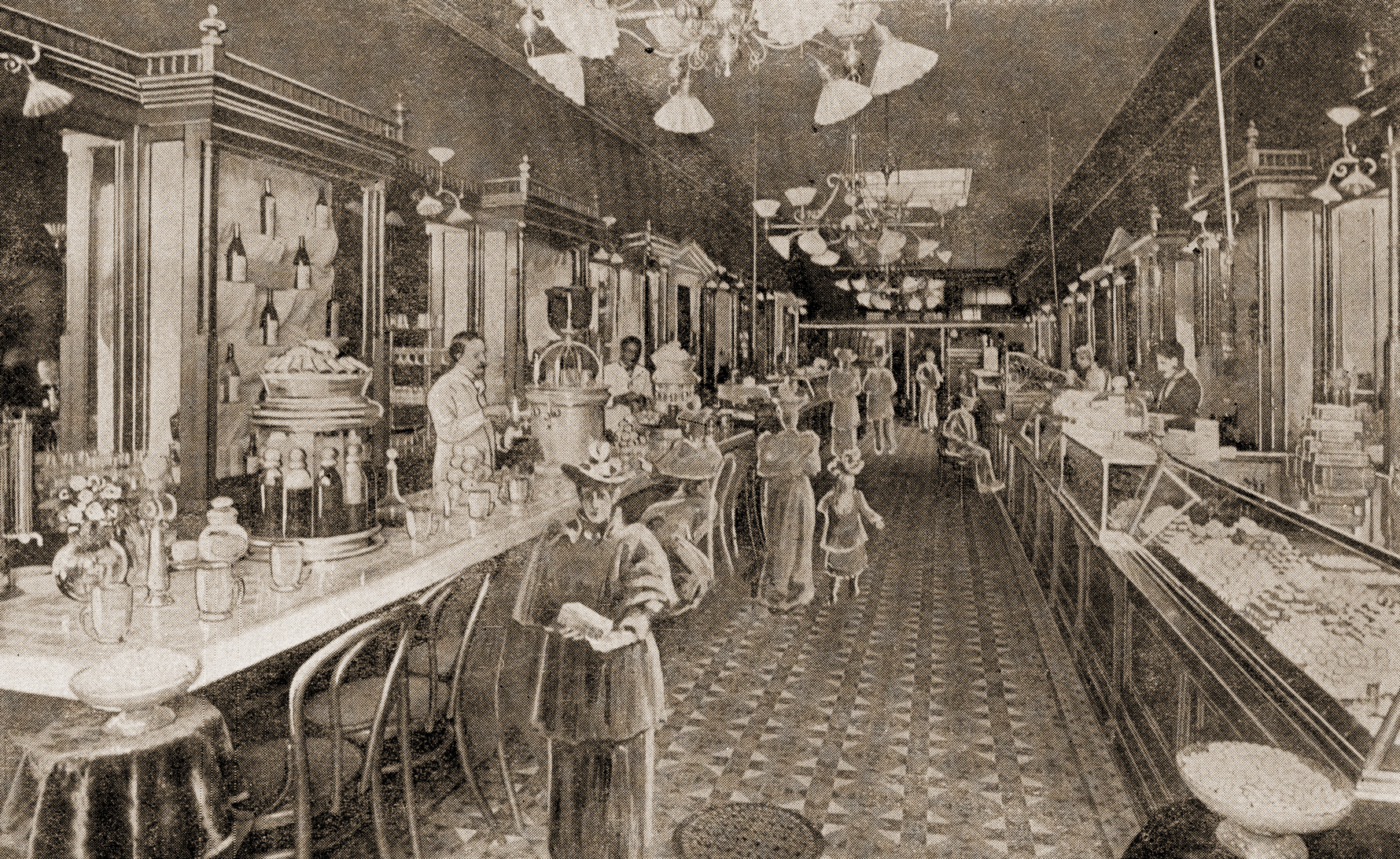
Whitman's retail store, on Chestnut St., in Center City, Philadelphia, Pennsylvania, in 1894

Whitman's confections have been produced for over 175 years. Originally a "confectionery and fruiterer shoppe" set up in 1842 by 19-year-old Stephen F. Whitman on the Philadelphia waterfront, Whitman's first became popular with traveling sailors and their wives. They would often bring imported fruits, nuts, and cocoa which were obtained during their voyages to Mr. Whitman so that he could make the popular European confections people craved in that era. Before long, Whitman's chocolates were popular throughout the northeastern United States. Whitman's produced the first pre-packaged candy in 1854—a box of sugar plums adorned with curlicues and rosebuds. Whitman's began advertising in newspapers, shortly before the beginning of the Civil War, and the business grew so large, that in 1866, the company occupied an entire building at 12th and Market Streets in Philadelphia. In 1877, he introduced Instantaneous Chocolates in tin boxes, that became much-admired. Whitman's later became Stephen F. Whitman & Son, Inc. Whitman's introduced the Whitman's Sampler in 1912, becoming the first use of cellophane by the candy industry. In 1915, the messenger boy was added to the Whitman's Sampler box, and became a symbol of quality. In 1946, the company helped General Electric develop a refrigerated display case to guard the product against warmer temperatures and extend the selling season through the summer months.

In the early 1960s, Whitman's was purchased by Pet, Inc., a manufacturer of evaporated milk as part of the company's attempt to become a food products conglomerate. Pet was taken over in 1978 by IC Industries (a holding company for the Illinois Central Railroad's non-rail assets), which eventually decided to focus on food and in 1988 took the name Whitman Corporation after the spinoff of some non-food operations because Whitman's was its best-known brand name. However, in 1991, Pet (including Whitman) was again spun off as the parent company decided to narrow its focus further (eventually becoming PepsiAmericas). In 1993, Pet sold the Whitman's brand to Russell Stover Candies, the major supplier of boxed candy in the United States. In July 2014, Russell Stover was acquired by the international company Lindt & Sprüngli. In 1984, Whitman's introduced its light chocolate. In 1987, Whitman's celebrated its 75th anniversary, and the Whitman's Sampler box had gained a new look. In 1991, the Smithsonian Institution acquired the Whitman's Chocolates Collection of print advertisements. In 1994, Whitman's teamed up with Peanuts characters to introduce its Peanuts-themed Whitman's products.

== Whitman's Sampler ==
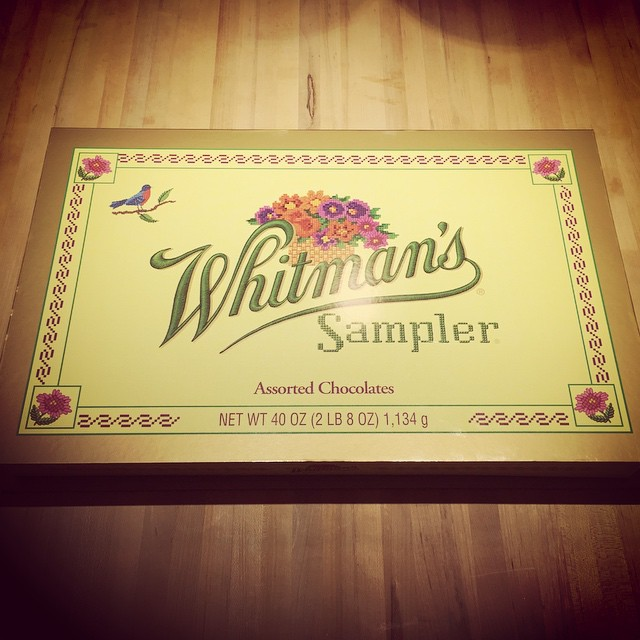
A Whitman's Sampler box of chocolates

The online Russell Stover history states that the Whitman's Sampler was introduced in 1912, and by 1915 it was the most popular of Whitman's line of candy. Also in 1915 the Messenger Boy molded chocolate piece was added to the assortment. During World War II, servicemen and women who got a Whitman's Sampler from family and friends spread the word about it once they returned home. Over the decades, it reached a level in American pop culture in that it was mentioned in many TV shows, movies, and the like. The stitching design of the package was inspired by grandma's needlework. The package of the box resembles the folk art sampler needlework of a bird on a branch, Pegasus, basket of flowers, rocking horse, rocking elephant, plants, rooster, dog, sailboat, tree, house, and a bear, hence the double entendre name of the product. It was the first box of chocolates to come equipped with an index of all the varieties of the sampler printed under the lid. Early designs of the package had "Whitman's Sampler Chocolates & Confections Started in 1842" written on it. The Sampler's contents vary from box to box, but generally contain milk and dark chocolate-covered caramel, coconut, molasses chew, chocolate-covered peanuts, almonds, cashews, clusters, cherry cordial, maple fudge, chocolate-covered toffee, and nougaty chocolate whipped candies. Seasonal flavors like strawberry cream, pumpkin marshmallow, and mint chocolate patties are occasionally included. The candies' flavors can be determined by their shapes: a square shape denotes caramels; a rectangle means nougat filling; oval chocolates typically contain fudge; the soft-centered flavors, including cherry cordials, are round; and nut clusters are easily identified by their rough surfaces. Newer samplers may no longer follow this precise format.

A Whitman's advertisement, from an 1899 newspaper.

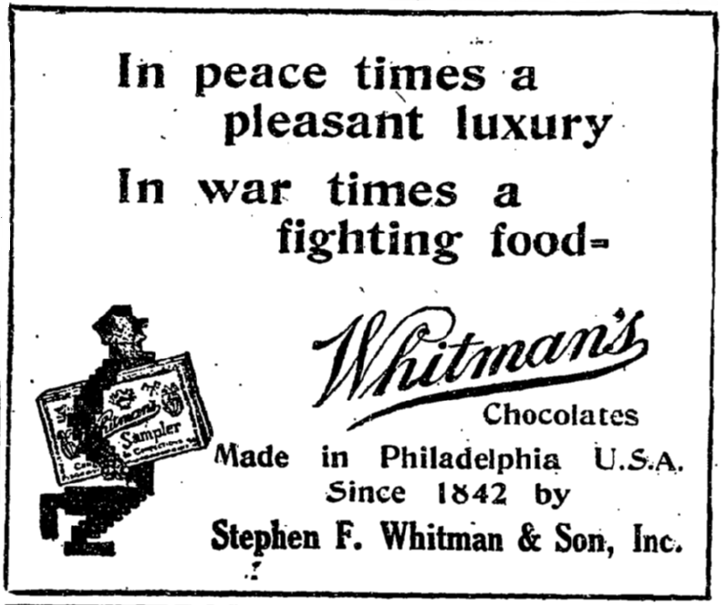
A Whitman's ad, from a WWI wartime newspaper, printed in France, circa 1918.

Whitman's 19th century advertisement

== In popular culture ==
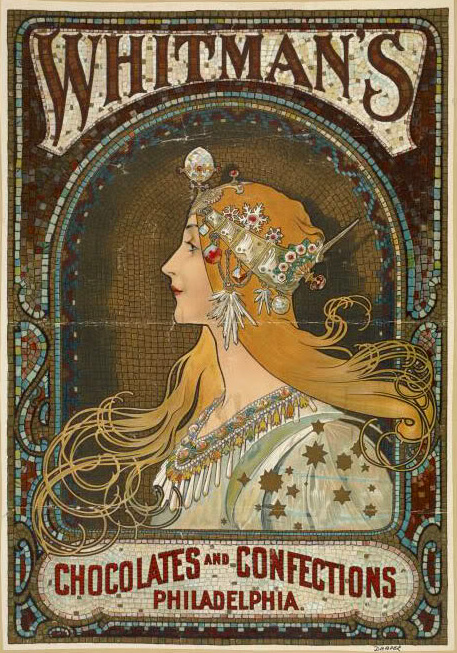
Whitman's Chocolates and Confections, Philadelphia, 19th century advertisement poster by Alphonse Mucha

- In the early 20th century, Pickaninny Peppermints were a popular Whitman confection. However, the NAACP lawyer and future Supreme Court Justice Thurgood Marshall took issue with the name. In a 1941 article directed at Whitman's published in the Afro-American, Marshall urged Whitman's Candies to realize its racial insensitivity. Whitman's denied that the term "pickaninny" was racist and responded to Marshall by saying that it meant "cute colored kid". The product was soon dropped.
- The candy was featured in Issue 32 of The Vault of Horror in the story, Ample Sample.
- The company has maintained a longstanding tradition of supporting American servicemen and servicewomen during wartime. During World War I, millions of tins were shipped to American soldiers throughout the world. During World War II, women at the Whitman's production line secretly slipped handwritten notes of encouragement into candy boxes to help soothe soldiers' homesickness.
- The G4 spinoff of The Soup called Web Soup spoofs the Whitman's Sampler package with a segment called Mixed Nuts Sampler.
- Wacky Packages parodied the Whitman's Sampler brand as "What Man's Simple Candy".
- Whitman's Sampler was mentioned by Mama Harper in the sitcom Mama's Family in the episode "Birthright", which first aired on January 31, 1987.
- A Whitman's Sampler box appears anachronistically in the film Kid Blue (1973), which is set in 1900.
- A Whitman's Sampler box was gifted by Paulie Gualtieri during a hospital visit in The Sopranos Season 3 episode "Another Toothpick". In Season 5 episode "Two Tonys", Whitman's Sampler was referenced by titular character Tony Soprano, when he sarcastically asked New York associate Johnny Sack: "What do you want, an apology? A fucking Whitman's Sampler? What?"
- In the episode "The Stall" of Seinfeld, George brings a Whitman's Sampler to Elaine's boyfriend Tony to apologize for injuring him while rock climbing. While Tony declines George's apology, he eagerly accepts the Whitman's Sampler.
- In the TV movie The Night Stalker (1972 film), reporter Carl Kolchak bribes Clark County Courthouse chief switchboard operator Helen O’Brien with a Whitman’s Sampler box in exchange for DMV information on the film’s murder suspect. The name brand on the box is surreptitiously covered with stick-on paper roses.

== See also ==
- List of bean-to-bar chocolate manufacturers

== Bibliography ==
- Williams, Juan. Thurgood Marshall American Revolutionary ISBN 0-8129-3299-4
- Baltimore Afro-American, Nov. 22 1941, p. 1
