= Alton, Kansas =

City in Osborne County, Kansas

- City
- Location within Osborne County and Kansas

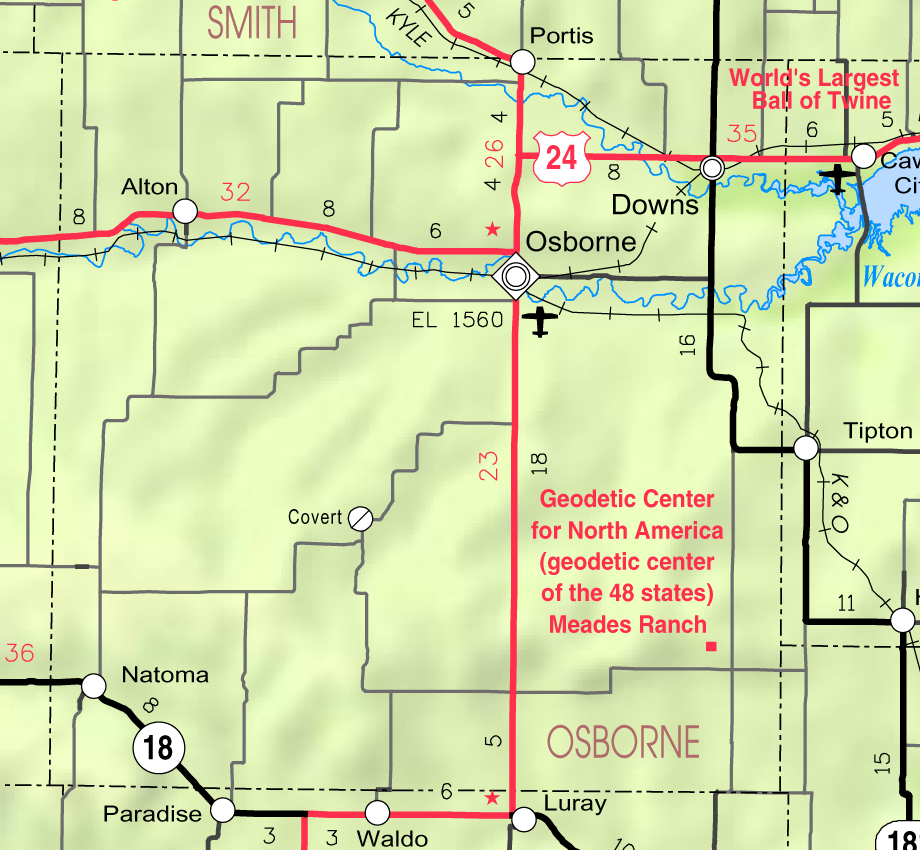
- KDOT map of Osborne County (legend)
- Coordinates: 39°28′04″N 98°56′55″W
- Country: United States
- State: Kansas
- County: Osborne
- Founded: 1870 (Bull City)
- Incorporated: 1885
- Named for: Alton, Illinois

Area
  - Total: 0.31 sq mi (0.80 km^{2})
  - Land: 0.31 sq mi (0.80 km^{2})
  - Water: 0 sq mi (0.00 km^{2})
- Elevation: 1,647 ft (502 m)

Population (2020)
  - Total: 100
  - Density: 320/sq mi (120/km^{2})
- Time zone: UTC-6 (CST)
  - Summer (DST): UTC-5 (CDT)
- ZIP Code: 67623
- Area code: 785
- FIPS code: 20-01600
- GNIS ID: 2393938

Alton is a city in Osborne County, Kansas, United States. As of the 2020 census, the population of the city was 100.

== History ==
Alton was founded in 1870 as Bull City and was named in honor of Hiram C. Bull. It was renamed Alton in 1885, after the city of Alton, Illinois because female residents didn't like the former name.

== Geography ==
According to the United States Census Bureau, the city has a total area of 0.31 square miles (0.80 km^{2}), all land.

=== Climate ===
Alton has a humid continental (Dfa/Dwa) climate typical for the central Great Plains. Its climate can also be considered humid subtropical (Cfa/Cwa) using the −3 °C (27 °F) isotherm. Summers are hot and often very humid, with heavy rain from thunderstorms not uncommon, whilst tornadoes are a frequent hazard and are often followed by heavy rainfall. Winter weather varies greatly from warm or even hot weather due to chinook winds to extreme cold when a North American High with very cold air moves southwards from Canada. The coldest temperature recorded in Alton was −31 °F or −35 °C on December 23, 1989.

One of the highest recorded temperatures in American history (and the highest in Kansas' recorded history) was recorded near Alton on July 24, 1936. On that day, the temperature maxed out at 121 °F or 49.4 °C. Only four states — California, Arizona, New Mexico and Nevada — have seen higher record temperatures. Alton's record April temperature of 106 °F or 41.1 °C on April 23, 1989, has been exceeded only by California, Arizona and Texas and tied by Nevada, Nebraska and Oklahoma. Nearby Hays holds the state record when it reached 107 °F (41.7 °C) the same day. Temperatures over 100 °F or 37.8 °C are expected on 15.9 each year and 90 °F or 32.2 °C on an average of 64.5 days per year.

The lowest temperature ever recorded in Kansas was measured in Lebanon, which sits in the adjacent Smith County, only about 35 miles away.

Climate data for Alton, Kansas, 1991–2020 normals, extremes 1902–2018
Month	Jan	Feb	Mar	Apr	May	Jun	Jul	Aug	Sep	Oct	Nov	Dec	Year
Record high °F (°C)	80 (27)	87 (31)	99 (37)	106 (41)	105 (41)	115 (46)	121 (49)	116 (47)	112 (44)	103 (39)	88 (31)	82 (28)	121 (49)
Mean maximum °F (°C)	66.0 (18.9)	72.3 (22.4)	81.0 (27.2)	87.9 (31.1)	93.1 (33.9)	101.0 (38.3)	105.3 (40.7)	103.2 (39.6)	99.2 (37.3)	90.8 (32.7)	76.8 (24.9)	66.3 (19.1)	106.7 (41.5)
Mean daily maximum °F (°C)	41.6 (5.3)	46.0 (7.8)	56.7 (13.7)	66.5 (19.2)	76.3 (24.6)	87.6 (30.9)	92.6 (33.7)	90.6 (32.6)	82.9 (28.3)	70.0 (21.1)	55.8 (13.2)	44.0 (6.7)	67.6 (19.8)
Daily mean °F (°C)	28.0 (−2.2)	31.9 (−0.1)	41.9 (5.5)	51.4 (10.8)	62.3 (16.8)	73.5 (23.1)	78.9 (26.1)	76.6 (24.8)	67.9 (19.9)	54.6 (12.6)	40.9 (4.9)	30.7 (−0.7)	53.2 (11.8)
Mean daily minimum °F (°C)	14.4 (−9.8)	17.9 (−7.8)	27.1 (−2.7)	36.4 (2.4)	48.3 (9.1)	59.5 (15.3)	65.3 (18.5)	62.6 (17.0)	52.9 (11.6)	39.3 (4.1)	25.9 (−3.4)	17.5 (−8.1)	38.9 (3.9)
Mean minimum °F (°C)	−4.4 (−20.2)	−3.3 (−19.6)	8.5 (−13.1)	20.8 (−6.2)	32.9 (0.5)	44.5 (6.9)	52.9 (11.6)	50.4 (10.2)	34.2 (1.2)	21.6 (−5.8)	8.6 (−13.0)	0.1 (−17.7)	−10.7 (−23.7)
Record low °F (°C)	−25 (−32)	−29 (−34)	−17 (−27)	4 (−16)	19 (−7)	33 (1)	41 (5)	33 (1)	18 (−8)	6 (−14)	−12 (−24)	−31 (−35)	−31 (−35)
Average precipitation inches (mm)	0.67 (17)	0.69 (18)	1.55 (39)	2.30 (58)	4.23 (107)	3.51 (89)	4.92 (125)	3.85 (98)	2.64 (67)	2.11 (54)	1.19 (30)	0.93 (24)	28.59 (726)
Average snowfall inches (cm)	3.8 (9.7)	4.8 (12)	2.0 (5.1)	1.2 (3.0)	0.0 (0.0)	0.0 (0.0)	0.0 (0.0)	0.0 (0.0)	0.0 (0.0)	0.4 (1.0)	2.1 (5.3)	3.3 (8.4)	17.6 (44.5)
Average precipitation days (≥ 0.01 in)	4.3	4.5	5.9	8.3	10.7	9.5	9.5	8.6	5.5	6.2	4.7	3.3	81.0
Average snowy days (≥ 0.1 in)	2.4	2.3	1.3	0.6	0.0	0.0	0.0	0.0	0.0	0.1	0.9	1.7	9.3
Source 1: NOAA
Source 2: National Weather Service (mean maxima/minima 1981–2010)

== Demographics ==
Historical population
Census	Pop.	Note	%±
1890	338		—
1900	287		−15.1%
1910	414		44.3%
1920	423		2.2%
1930	383		−9.5%
1940	435		13.6%
1950	317		−27.1%
1960	299		−5.7%
1970	214		−28.4%
1980	135		−36.9%
1990	115		−14.8%
2000	117		1.7%
2010	103		−12.0%
2020	100		−2.9%
U.S. Decennial Census

=== 2020 census ===
The 2020 United States census counted 100 people, 35 households, and 21 families in Alton. The population density was 323.6 per square mile (125.0/km^{2}). There were 63 housing units at an average density of 203.9 per square mile (78.7/km^{2}). The racial makeup was 97.0% (97) white or European American (96.0% non-Hispanic white), 0.0% (0) black or African-American, 0.0% (0) Native American or Alaska Native, 0.0% (0) Asian, 0.0% (0) Pacific Islander or Native Hawaiian, 1.0% (1) from other races, and 2.0% (2) from two or more races. Hispanic or Latino of any race was 1.0% (1) of the population.

Of the 35 households, 17.1% had children under the age of 18; 42.9% were married couples living together; 20.0% had a female householder with no spouse or partner present. 37.1% of households consisted of individuals and 11.4% had someone living alone who was 65 years of age or older. The average household size was 2.0 and the average family size was 3.0. The percentage of those with a bachelor's degree or higher was estimated to be 7.0% of the population.

28.0% of the population was under the age of 18, 6.0% from 18 to 24, 18.0% from 25 to 44, 30.0% from 45 to 64, and 18.0% who were 65 years of age or older. The median age was 42.5 years. For every 100 females, there were 96.1 males. For every 100 females ages 18 and older, there were 89.5 males.

The 2016–2020 5-year American Community Survey estimates show that the median household income was $47,969 (with a margin of error of +/- $13,979) and the median family income was $48,594 (+/- $8,951). The median income for those above 16 years old was $36,875 (+/- $26,308). Approximately, 17.4% of families and 21.9% of the population were below the poverty line, including 25.0% of those under the age of 18 and 11.8% of those ages 65 or over.

=== 2010 census ===
As of the census of 2010, there were 103 people, 47 households, and 22 families residing in the city. The population density was 332.3 inhabitants per square mile (128.3/km^{2}). There were 68 housing units at an average density of 219.4 per square mile (84.7/km^{2}). The racial makeup of the city was 97.1% White and 2.9% from two or more races.

There were 47 households, of which 21.3% had children under the age of 18 living with them, 38.3% were married couples living together, 8.5% had a female householder with no husband present, and 53.2% were non-families. 40.4% of all households were made up of individuals, and 21.3% had someone living alone who was 65 years of age or older. The average household size was 2.19 and the average family size was 2.77.

The median age in the city was 48.3 years. 18.4% of residents were under the age of 18; 6% were between the ages of 18 and 24; 22.4% were from 25 to 44; 25.3% were from 45 to 64; and 28.2% were 65 years of age or older. The gender makeup of the city was 52.4% male and 47.6% female.

== Education ==
Alton is served by Osborne County USD 392 public school district.

Alton High School was closed through school unification in 1970. The Alton High School mascot was Wildcats.

== Notable people ==
- Elsie Benedict – Suffrage leader, Author, Lecturer
- Hiram Bull – politician and businessman
- Len Dugan – American football player
- Bruce Goff – architect and a designer of the Boston Avenue Methodist Church
- Russell Stover – confectioner and first mass-producer of the Eskimo Pie
