= Ray E. Dillon Jr. =

American businessman (1924–2015)

- Born: May 7, 1924
- Died: August 15, 2015 (aged 91)
- Spouse: Betty Lou Lay (m. 1946; died 2014)
- Children: 3

Ray Ernest Dillon Jr. (May 7, 1924 - August 15, 2015), sometimes known by the nickname "Ace", was an American businessman. After serving in the United States Army's 492nd Fighter Squadron as a fighter pilot, he was the president of grocery chain Dillons for 18 years, overseeing its expansion outside of Kansas.

== Early childhood ==
Ray Ernest Dillon Jr. was born on May 7, 1924, to Ray Ernest Dillon Sr. and Stella Schmitt Dillon. He was their oldest child, with one younger brother named Richard W. Dillon. Dillon lived in Hutchinson, Kansas, for most of his life. He began working at Dillons as a bagger by the age of 8 or 9.

His friends coined the nickname "Ace" while he was a boy scout. To complete a merit badge, Dillon wrote about a flying ace from World War I, shared the story with his fellow scouts, and received his nickname. Dillon also reached the rank of Eagle Scout.

== Education and military service ==
When the age of 18, Dillon attended the University of Kansas for one semester before joining the United States Army as an enlisted soldier in 1944.

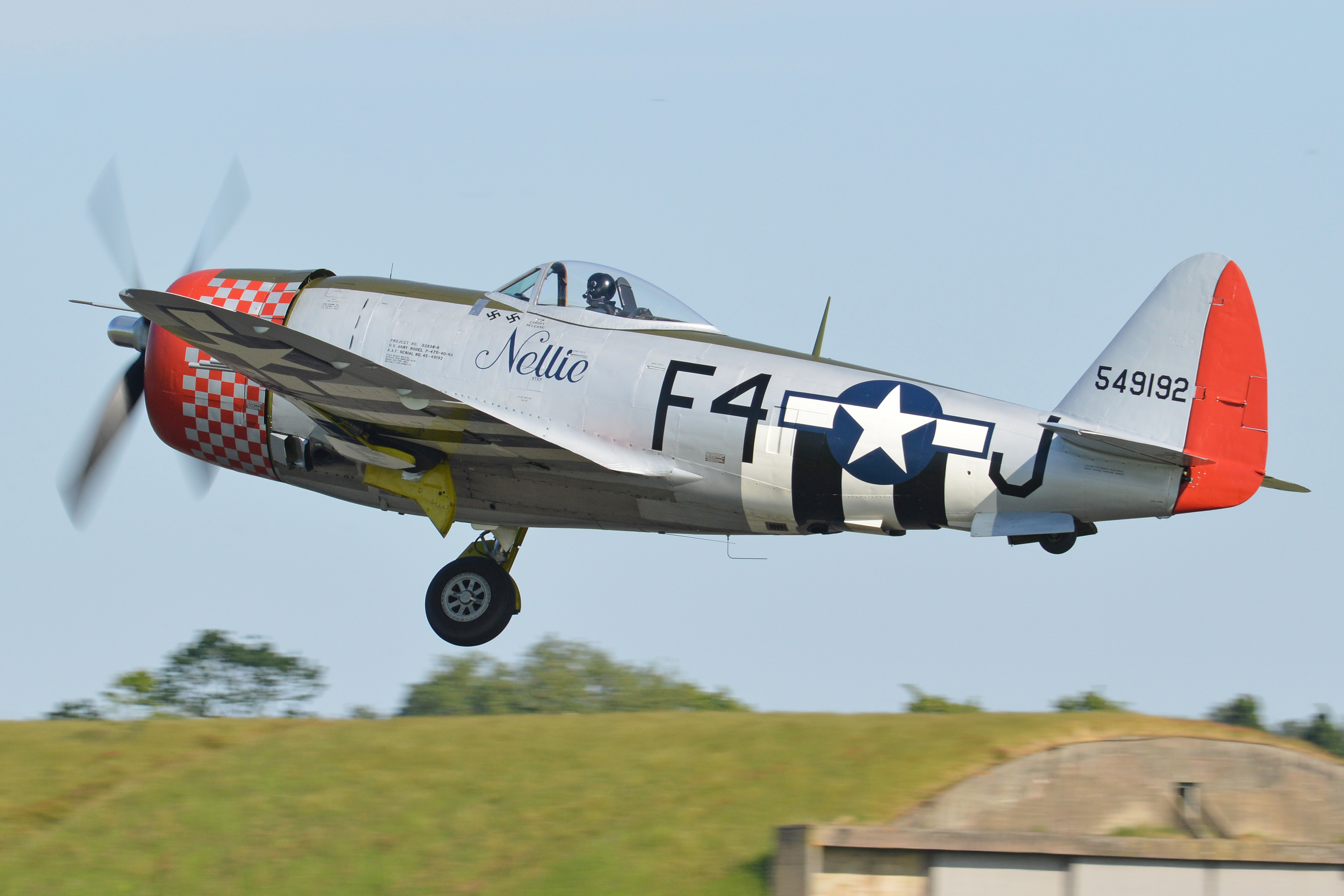
A P-47 Thunderbolt with markings from the 492nd Fighter Squadron

Dillon served in Europe in the 492nd Fighter Squadron as a fighter pilot in World War II. He flew in 92 combat operations in Republic P-47 Thunderbolts. He was awarded the Air Medal with twelve oak leaf clusters along with the Distinguished Flying Cross. He left the military in late 1945 but continued to fly for 51 years as a private pilot.

Following his military service, he returned to college for one more year.

== Career with Dillons ==
Logo of Dillons

After his time in college and the military, Dillon entered management at Dillons and later became its president and CEO. He was the chain's president for 18 years, overseeing its expansion outside of Kansas to nearby states. In 1980, he became the company's board chairperson after his father's retirement the year prior.

In 1991, Dillon was inducted into the Kansas Business Hall of Fame for his contributions to the business prestige of Kansas.

== Personal life ==
In 1946 in Wichita, Kansas, Dillon married Betty Lou Lay. They had three children, named Diane Buehler, Butch Dillon, and Janet Duval. Betty died in September 2014.

Ray Dillon Jr. died in his home on August 15, 2015, when he was 91 years old.
