= Hiram C. Bull =

American politician

Hiram C. Bull (August 19, 1820 – October 12, 1879) was an American businessman, politician, and military officer.

Born in Laona, Chautauqua County, New York, he went to school in Fredonia, New York, where he also studied law. He was admitted to the New York bar in 1843 and practiced law. He moved to Johnstown, Pennsylvania and then to Milwaukee, Wisconsin. He lived briefly in California. Bull then opened lumberyards in Milwaukee as well as Janesville and Madison, Wisconsin. Bull served in the second Wisconsin Constitutional Convention of 1847–1848. He then served in the Wisconsin State Senate, from Madison, Wisconsin, in 1857 and 1858 as a Republican. He served as adjutant-general of Wisconsin. Bull also was involved with the Wisconsin Historical Society. In 1859, he moved to St. Louis, Missouri and then to Arizona Territory and New Mexico Territory. He served in the 9th Iowa Volunteer Infantry Regiment during the American Civil War. After the war, Bull opened a lumberyard in Leavenworth, Kansas. In 1870, he helped found the town of Bull City, Kansas in Osborne County, Kansas. In 1872, Bull served as probate judge for Osborne County. From 1877 until his death in 1879, Bull served in the Kansas House of Representatives as a Republican. On October 12, 1879, Bull was gored to death by an elk at his home in Bull City.
