= Russell Stover =

American businessman (1888–1954)

- Born: Russell William Stover; May 6, 1888; Alton, Kansas
- Died: May 11, 1954 (aged 66); United States
- Occupation: Confectioner
- Known for: Co-Founder, Russell Stover Candies
- Spouse: Clara Mae Lewis
- Website: http://www.russellstover.com/

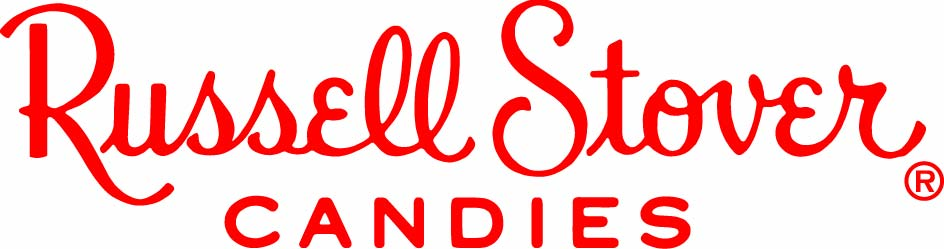

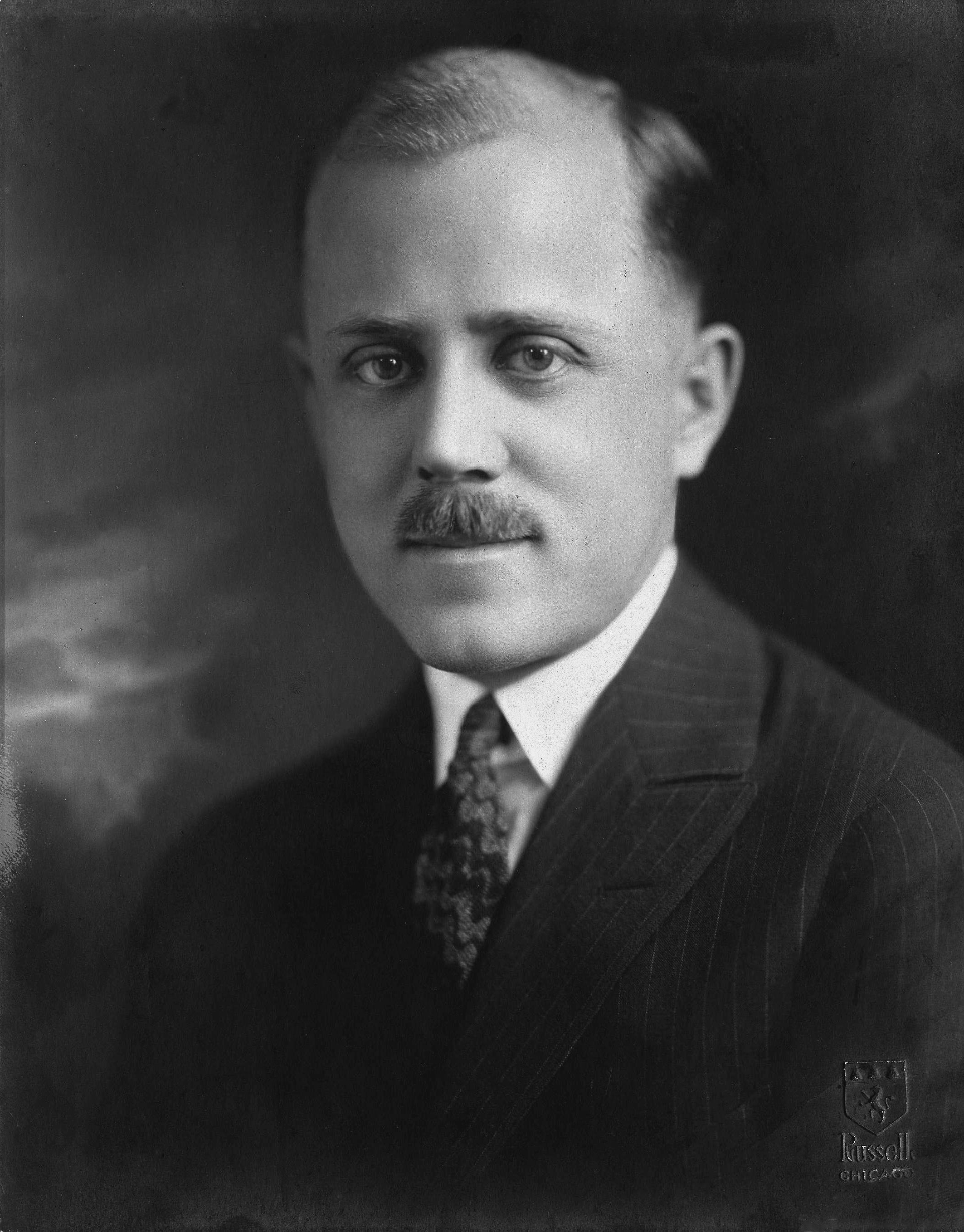
Christian Kent Nelson, co-founder with Russell Stover, of the "Eskimo Pie" ice cream bar, portrait from 1922

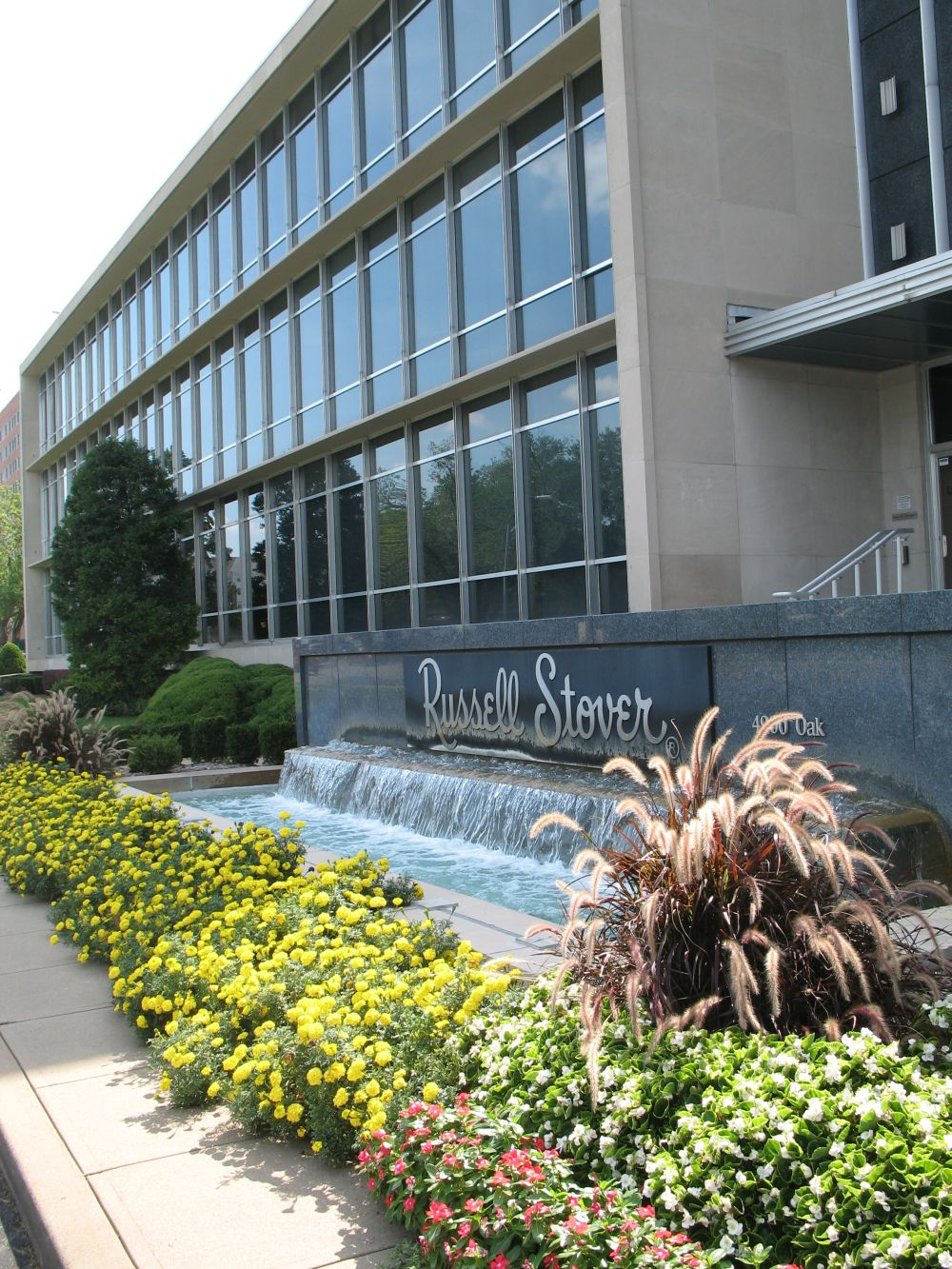
Russell Stover headquarters in Kansas City, Missouri

Russell William Stover (May 6, 1888 – May 11, 1954) was an American chemist and entrepreneur, and co-founder, with his wife Clara, of Russell Stover Candies.

== Early life ==
In 1911, Stover married Clara Mae Lewis, whom he had met at the Iowa City Academy, and they moved to a 580-acre (2.3 km^{2}) farm in Saskatchewan, Canada, which they received as a wedding gift. On the farm, they raised wheat and flax but after a year, they considered the venture to have been a failure and, in 1912, they moved to Winnipeg.

Stover then entered the candy industry. He first went to work for a Minnesota candy company and then for the A. G. Morris Candy Company in Chicago. In 1918, the couple moved to Des Moines, where Stover worked for the Irwin Candy Company, and then they moved to Omaha, Nebraska.

== Eskimo Pie ==
On July 31, 1921, Christian Nelson of Onawa, Iowa, pitched the concept of mass-producing a chocolate-covered ice cream treat called the I-Scream Bar to Russell Stover. Seven companies had previously rejected the idea because the confection easily melted away.

Stover went into partnership with Nelson, and their agreement was signed on the letterhead of the Graham Ice Cream Company of Omaha. Stover renamed the I-Scream Bar to Eskimo Pie and took out the stick to make it a sandwich. Stover has also been credited, through his knowledge of chemistry, with devising the formula for the chocolate shell that hardens on exposure to cold and holds the ice cream contents within. Nelson patented the confection on January 24, 1922.

The Eskimo Pie immediately became so successful, the factory could not keep up with demand and the company licensed the formula to 1,500 manufacturers in exchange for a royalty of one cent per dozen sold. The treat was marketed under the brand of Russell Stover Company and, in April 1922, The New York Times stated that the partners had received US$30,000 a week in royalties in the first year.

Following the success of the Eskimo Pie, competing manufacturers soon came up with similar, but different, processes for making frozen ice cream pies, and at one point Stover and Nelson were paying $4,000 per day in legal fees to defend their patent, a battle which they ultimately lost.

== Russell Stover Candies ==
In 1923, Russell Stover sold his share of the Eskimo Pie company for $25,000 and moved to Denver, Colorado, where he and his wife started a new company, Mrs. Stover's Bungalow Candies, which operated out of Clara Stover's kitchen in their bungalow, making boxed chocolates. In 1925, the couple opened a candy factory in Denver and another one in Kansas City, Missouri. In 1931, the company moved its headquarters to Kansas City.

During the 1940s, the name of the company was officially changed to Russell Stover Candies.

When Russell Stover died in 1954, five days after his 66th birthday, the company that bore his name was producing 11 million pounds of candy annually and selling its products through 40 Russell Stover shops and in about 2,000 department stores. Clara Stover operated the company until 1960, when it was sold to Louis Ward for $7.5 million. At the time of the purchase, Mr. Ward owned a box company that had Russell Stover Candies as an important customer.

The Ward family owned the brand until July 14, 2014, when the Swiss chocolate-maker Lindt bought Russell Stover Candies. At the time of the sale, Lindt reported the revenue of Russell Stover Candies at $500 million.
