= Len Dugan =

American football player (1910–1967)

No. 5, 22, 46, 27, 39
- Position: Center / Linebacker

Personal information
- Born: February 19, 1910; Alton, Kansas, U.S.
- Died: June 20, 1967 (aged 57); Olmsted County, Minnesota, U.S.
- Listed height: 6 ft 0 in (1.83 m)
- Listed weight: 218 lb (99 kg)

Career information
- High school: McCracken (McCracken, Kansas)
- College: Wichita State (1932–1935)
- NFL draft: 1936: undrafted

Career history
- New York Giants (1936); Paterson Panthers (1936); Chicago Cardinals (1937–1939); Pittsburgh Pirates (1939)
- Stats at Pro Football Reference

Leonard Mack Dugan (February 19, 1910 – June 20, 1967) was an American professional football player who played four seasons in the National Football League (NFL) with the New York Giants, Chicago Cardinals and Pittsburgh Pirates. He played college football at Wichita State University.

== Early life and college ==
Leonard Mack Dugan was born on February 19, 1910, in Alton, Kansas. He attended McCracken High School in McCracken, Kansas.

Dugan was a member of the Wichita State Shockers of Wichita State University from 1932 to 1935.

== Professional career ==
Dugan went undrafted in the 1936 NFL draft. He signed with the New York Giants on August 3, 1936. He played in three games, starting one, for the Giants during the 1936 season before being released that year. Dugan also played in one game for the Paterson Panthers of the American Association in 1936.

Dugan was signed by the Chicago Cardinals in 1937. He appeared in all 11 games, starting five, for the Cardinals in 1937. The team finished the year with a 5–5–1 record. He played in eight games, starting three, during the 1938 season. Dugan appeared in four games for the Cardinals in 1939.

On November 1, 1939, it was reported that Dugan had been purchased from the Cardinals by the Pittsburgh Pirates. He broke his ankle on his first play as a Pirate and never played in the NFL again.

== Personal life ==
Dugan served in the United States Army. He died on June 20, 1967, in Olmsted County, Minnesota.
