= Clara Stover =

American businesswoman and chocolatier (1882–1975)

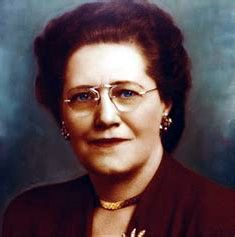
- Born: Clara Mae Lewis; 1882; Oxford, Iowa, U.S.
- Died: 1975 (aged 92–93); Kansas City, Missouri
- Occupations: Candy maker, company owner
- Years active: 1910s–1960
- Known for: Co-founding with husband Russell Stover the Russell Stover Candies company

Clara Mae Stover (1882–1975) was the wife of candy maker Russell Stover, and co-founder of Russell Stover Candies. A lifelong participant in the business, she ran the company for six years following Russell's death.

== Early life ==
Clara Mae Stover was born in Oxford, Iowa, in 1882. She was raised on a farm with three sisters, and strongly influenced by one of her grandmothers to be self-reliant.

Clara and Russell Stover met as students at the Iowa City Academy in Iowa City, Iowa. They were married in 1911. They bought a 580-acre wheat and flax farm in Saskatchewan, Canada, but the heavy rains destroyed their crops.

== Career ==
=== Introduction to candy industry ===
Russell Stover was hired by a candy company in Winnipeg, Manitoba, Canada. Some years later the couple returned to the United States, where Russell worked for confectioners, in Des Moines, Iowa, and Chicago, Illinois, during the balance of the 1910s.

=== Naming the "Eskimo Pie" ===
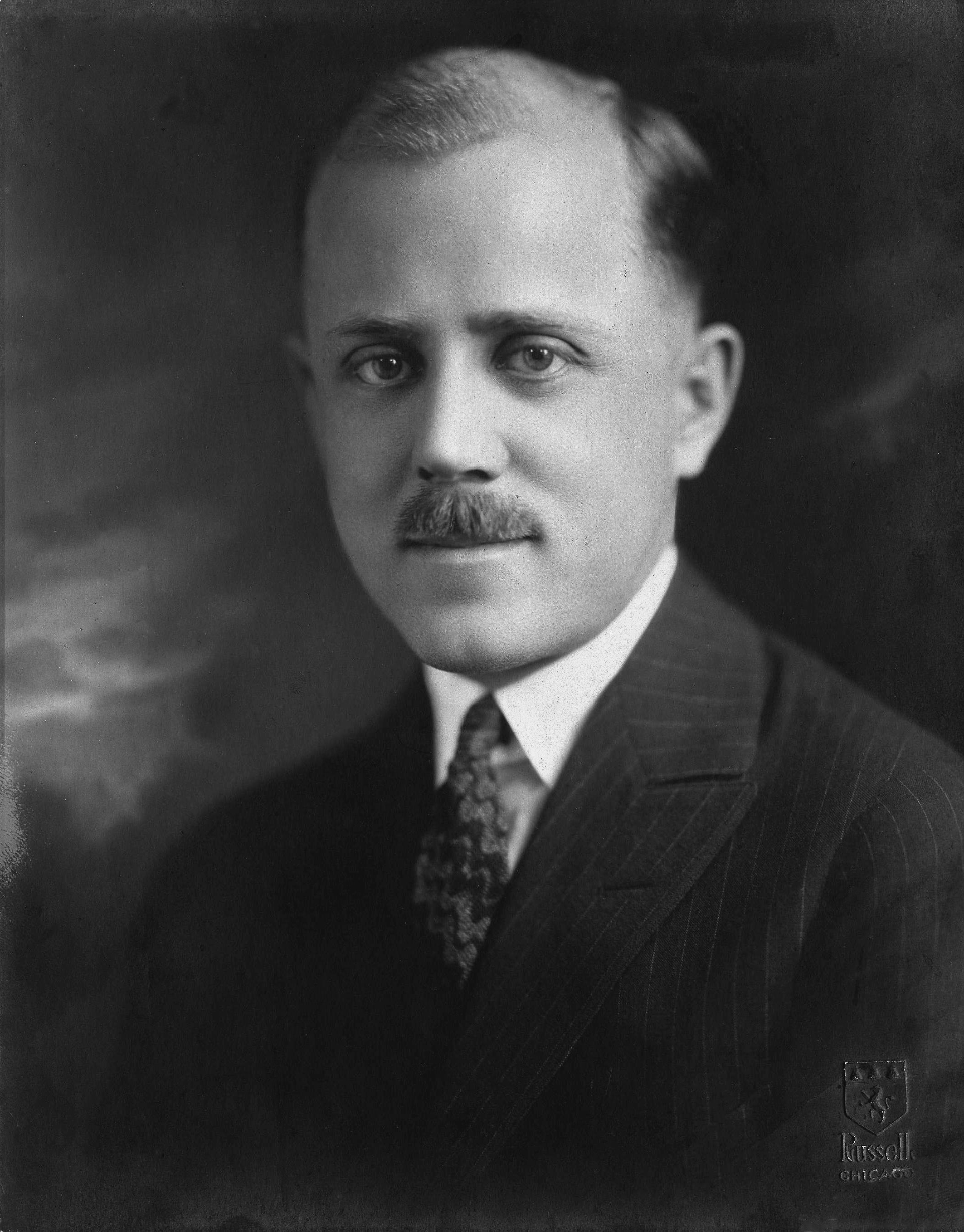
"Eskimo Pie" inventor Christian Kent Nelson, who partnered with Russell Stover to create the chocolate-covered ice cream bar (Image, 1922)

Iowa schoolteacher Christian Nelson had the idea of enrobing a block of vanilla ice cream with melted chocolate. He partnered with Russell Stover, then studying chemistry at the University of Iowa, to develop a workable process of doing so without melting the ice cream. In 1921, a patent was granted, allowing Nelson's concept to be mass produced. At a dinner party, Clara suggested calling the novelty an "Eskimo Pie", which became a national sensation. Russell was soon offered licensing agreements, which he accepted, and buyout offers into the millions of dollars, which he refused; instead, he focused on suing imitators. Ultimately he waited too long, imitators thrived, the initial craze wore down, and licensed sales plummeted into the mere thousands of dollars.

=== The Russell Stover Candy Company ===
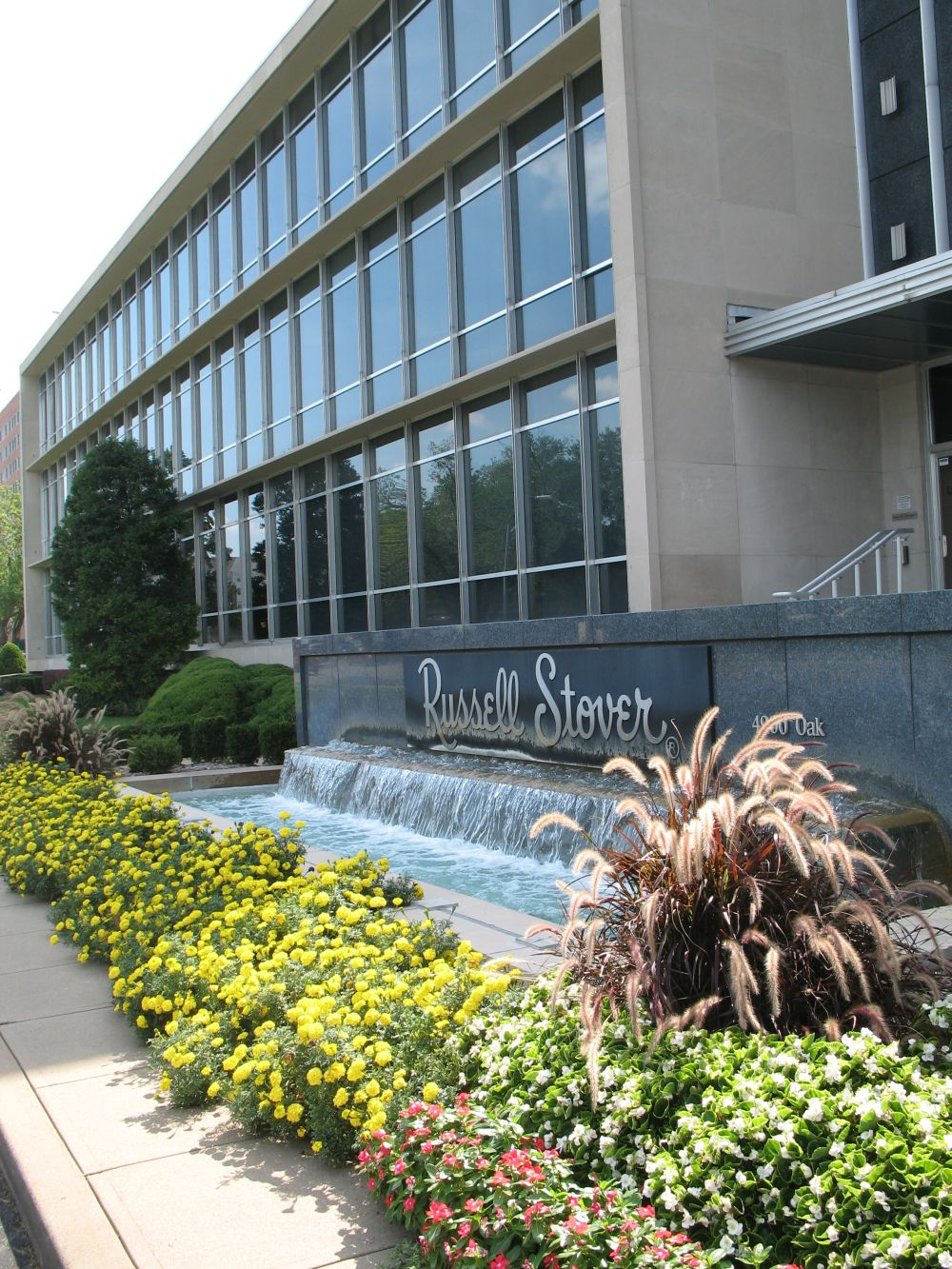
Russell Stover headquarters in Kansas City, Missouri

The Stovers relocated to Denver, Colorado, and used their meager earnings to create their own confectionery company, "Mrs. Stover's Bungalow Candies". With success came factories in Denver and Kansas City, Missouri. By 1932, all operations were relocated to Kansas City, sales having increased from 20,000 to 11 million pounds. In 1943, the company was renamed "Russell Stover Candies".

=== Later years with the company ===
In 1954, Russell Stover died. At the time there were 40 company-owned stores and their candy was sold in 2,000 pharmacies and department stores nationwide. Clara took over and ran the business until 1960. That year, Louis Ward, a box-maker who had been supplying packaging materials to the company, purchased a controlling interest and took the business public.

== Personal life ==
Clara Stover died in Kansas City in 1975, where she had lived with her husband. Her cremated remains are interred with those of her husband and daughter at Mount Moriah Cemetery in Kansas City.
