= Kansas Chamber of Commerce =

- Founded: 1924
- Type: Non-Profit
- Coordinates: 39.049191°N 95.669117°W
- Region served: Kansas
- Key people: Alan Cobb (President & CEO)
- Website: www.kansaschamber.org
- Formerly called: Kansas Association of Chambers of Commerce; Kansas State Chamber of Commerce; Kansas Association of Commerce and Industry

Kansas Chamber of Commerce (KCC) is a statewide business and industrial coalition in the state of Kansas.

== History ==
KCC was founded in 1924 by representatives of 40 local chambers of commerce, who met in Hutchinson, Kansas. The founders focused on improving the state's highways. Its initial name was the Kansas Association of Chambers of Commerce.

In 1925, it was renamed the Kansas Chamber of Commerce. The group adopted a new constitution, and expanded to also promote the development of agriculture, waterways, and natural resources; advertising Kansas and its resources; and assisting member organizations.

In 1927 Chamber headquarters moved from Kansas City, Kansas to office space in the capital of Topeka for proximity to Kansas legislators.

The chamber created a number of committees in 1930: agriculture; industry; tourist travel; advertising and publicity; research and conservation; forestation and recreation; and education.

The group changed its name to the Kansas State Chamber of Commerce in 1938; it adopted the name Kansas Association of Commerce and Industry in 1972.

In 1987, it took the name Kansas Chamber of Commerce and Industry.

It 2004, it returned to its 1925 name, Kansas Chamber of Commerce.

== Mission statement ==
The Kansas Chamber of Commerce "is to continually strive to improve the economic climate for the benefit of every business and citizen and to safeguard our system of free, competitive enterprise. Join us in making Kansas the best state in America to do business."

The chamber says it aims to represent the interests of small, medium, and large employers from all industry sectors. It strives to build meaningful coalitions and collaborative partnerships that influence Kansas legislation, according to the organization. Its annual legislative agenda is based upon member input.

Major programs under the Kansas Chamber Education Foundation include the Kansas Retail Council, Kansas Manufacturing Council, and Leadership Kansas. It also has a Chamber Political Action Committee which focuses on recruiting, supporting, and endorsing candidates who are committed to the free-enterprise system and support Kansas Chamber policy objectives. .

== Board of directors ==
The Kansas Chamber of Commerce Board of Directors is composed of members around the state of Kansas and represent various industries and professions. They oversee the operations of the organization.
