= Logan, Kansas =

City in Phillips County, Kansas

- City
- Location within Phillips County and Kansas

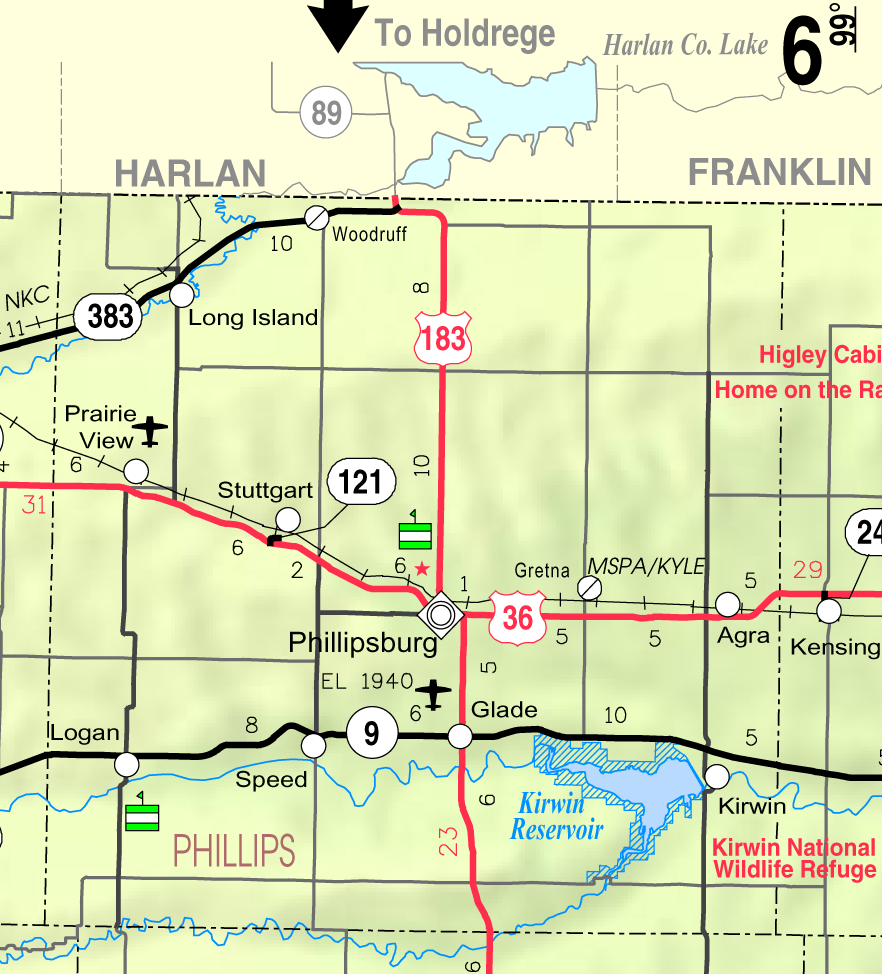
- KDOT map of Phillips County (legend)
- Coordinates: 39°39′42″N 99°34′02″W
- Country: United States
- State: Kansas
- County: Phillips
- Founded: 1870
- Incorporated: 1880
- Named for: Gen. John Logan

Area
  - Total: 1.50 sq mi (3.89 km^{2})
  - Land: 1.50 sq mi (3.89 km^{2})
  - Water: 0 sq mi (0.00 km^{2})
- Elevation: 1,959 ft (597 m)

Population (2020)
  - Total: 460
  - Density: 310/sq mi (120/km^{2})
- Time zone: UTC-6 (CST)
  - Summer (DST): UTC-5 (CDT)
- ZIP Code: 67646
- Area code: 785
- FIPS code: 20-42100
- GNIS ID: 2395745
- Website: discoverlogan.com

Logan is a city in Phillips County, Kansas, United States. As of the 2020 census, the population of the city was 460.

== History ==
Logan was founded in 1870. It was named for Gen. John A. Logan. The first post office in Logan was established in March 1872.

Logan experienced growth when, circa 1880, the railroad was built through the town. It was removed in the mid 1990s.

== Geography ==
According to the United States Census Bureau, the city has a total area of 1.51 square miles (3.91 km^{2}), all land.

== Demographics ==
Historical population
Census	Pop.	Note	%±
1880	275		—
1890	390		41.8%
1900	449		15.1%
1910	714		59.0%
1920	585		−18.1%
1930	743		27.0%
1940	703		−5.4%
1950	859		22.2%
1960	846		−1.5%
1970	760		−10.2%
1980	720		−5.3%
1990	633		−12.1%
2000	603		−4.7%
2010	589		−2.3%
2020	460		−21.9%
U.S. Decennial Census

=== 2020 census ===
The 2020 United States census counted 460 people, 223 households, and 111 families in Logan. The population density was 306.7 per square mile (118.4/km^{2}). There were 285 housing units at an average density of 190.0 per square mile (73.4/km^{2}). The racial makeup was 92.61% (426) white or European American (90.0% non-Hispanic white), 0.0% (0) black or African-American, 0.43% (2) Native American or Alaska Native, 0.22% (1) Asian, 0.0% (0) Pacific Islander or Native Hawaiian, 1.52% (7) from other races, and 5.22% (24) from two or more races. Hispanic or Latino of any race was 6.09% (28) of the population.

Of the 223 households, 15.2% had children under the age of 18; 45.7% were married couples living together; 26.9% had a female householder with no spouse or partner present. 46.6% of households consisted of individuals and 25.6% had someone living alone who was 65 years of age or older. The average household size was 2.4 and the average family size was 3.0. The percent of those with a bachelor's degree or higher was estimated to be 28.5% of the population.

19.8% of the population was under the age of 18, 5.2% from 18 to 24, 19.3% from 25 to 44, 23.9% from 45 to 64, and 31.7% who were 65 years of age or older. The median age was 51.3 years. For every 100 females, there were 103.5 males. For every 100 females ages 18 and older, there were 108.5 males.

The 2016–2020 5-year American Community Survey estimates show that the median household income was $51,500 (with a margin of error of +/- $6,745) and the median family income was $47,813 (+/- $13,816). Males had a median income of $32,656 (+/- $10,049) versus $19,764 (+/- $7,682) for females. The median income for those above 16 years old was $30,402 (+/- $10,098). Approximately, 30.4% of families and 28.2% of the population were below the poverty line, including 50.6% of those under the age of 18 and 9.1% of those ages 65 or over.

=== 2010 census ===
As of the census of 2010, there were 589 people, 261 households, and 169 families residing in the city. The population density was 390.1 inhabitants per square mile (150.6/km^{2}). There were 311 housing units at an average density of 206.0 per square mile (79.5/km^{2}). The racial makeup of the city was 99.3% White, 0.5% from other races, and 0.2% from two or more races. Hispanic or Latino of any race were 1.5% of the population.

There were 261 households, of which 24.9% had children under the age of 18 living with them, 53.3% were married couples living together, 6.9% had a female householder with no husband present, 4.6% had a male householder with no wife present, and 35.2% were non-families. 33.7% of all households were made up of individuals, and 18.4% had someone living alone who was 65 years of age or older. The average household size was 2.26 and the average family size was 2.85.

The median age in the city was 45.2 years. 27% of residents were under the age of 18; 2.6% were between the ages of 18 and 24; 20.3% were from 25 to 44; 26.9% were from 45 to 64; and 23.3% were 65 years of age or older. The gender makeup of the city was 45.7% male and 54.3% female.

== Education ==
The community is served by Logan USD 326 public school district.

The Logan Trojans won the Kansas State High School boys class 1A basketball championship in 1970.
