= Louis Ward =

American businessman (1919–1996)

- Born: Louis Larrick Ward; November 18, 1919; Lenora, Kansas, U.S.
- Died: February 10, 1996 (aged 76); Kansas City, Missouri, U.S.
- Education: Stanford University (BS)
- Known for: Leading and owning Russell Stover Candies
- Spouse: Adelaide Selby Cobb (m. 1955; died 1996)
- Children: 3

Louis Larrick Ward (November 18, 1919 – February 10, 1996) was an American businessman who successfully turned the Russell Stover Candies company into an international brand after purchasing the company in 1960.

== Early life and education ==
Ward was born November 18, 1919, in Lenora, Kansas, to Carter William and Fern Alpha Ward (née Larrick). He initially attended the University of Kansas from 1937 to 1938 before ultimately transferring and in 1941 earning a bachelor's degree in chemical engineering from Stanford University.

== Career ==
Since 1946, Ward has been with multiple employers in the chemical industry such as Drexel, Harriman & Company and Spencer Chemical Company. In 1960, he acquired Russell Stover Candies and built into an internationally known brand. He also served as a director to the First National Bank in Kansas City, Missouri.

== Personal life ==
On December 15, 1955, Ward married Adelaide Selby Cobb (1933-2022), later chair of the Ward Family Foundation. They had three children:

- Linda Larrick Ward
- Scott Hardman Ward
- Thomas Selby Ward

Louis L. Ward died on February 10, 1996, aged 76, in Kansas City, Missouri.
