= Russell Stover Candies =

Candy manufacturer

Russell Stover Chocolates
- Company type: Subsidiary
- Industry: Chocolate confections
- Founded: 1923; 103 years ago Denver, Colorado, U.S.
- Founders: Russell William Stover; Clara Stover
- Headquarters: Kansas City, Missouri, U.S.
- Number of locations: Manufacturing – Iola, Kansas; Abilene, Kansas; Corsicana, Texas
- Products: Chocolate Confections
- Owner: Lindt & Sprüngli
- Parent: Lindt & Sprüngli
- Subsidiaries: Whitman's and Pangburn's Chocolates
- Website: www.russellstover.com

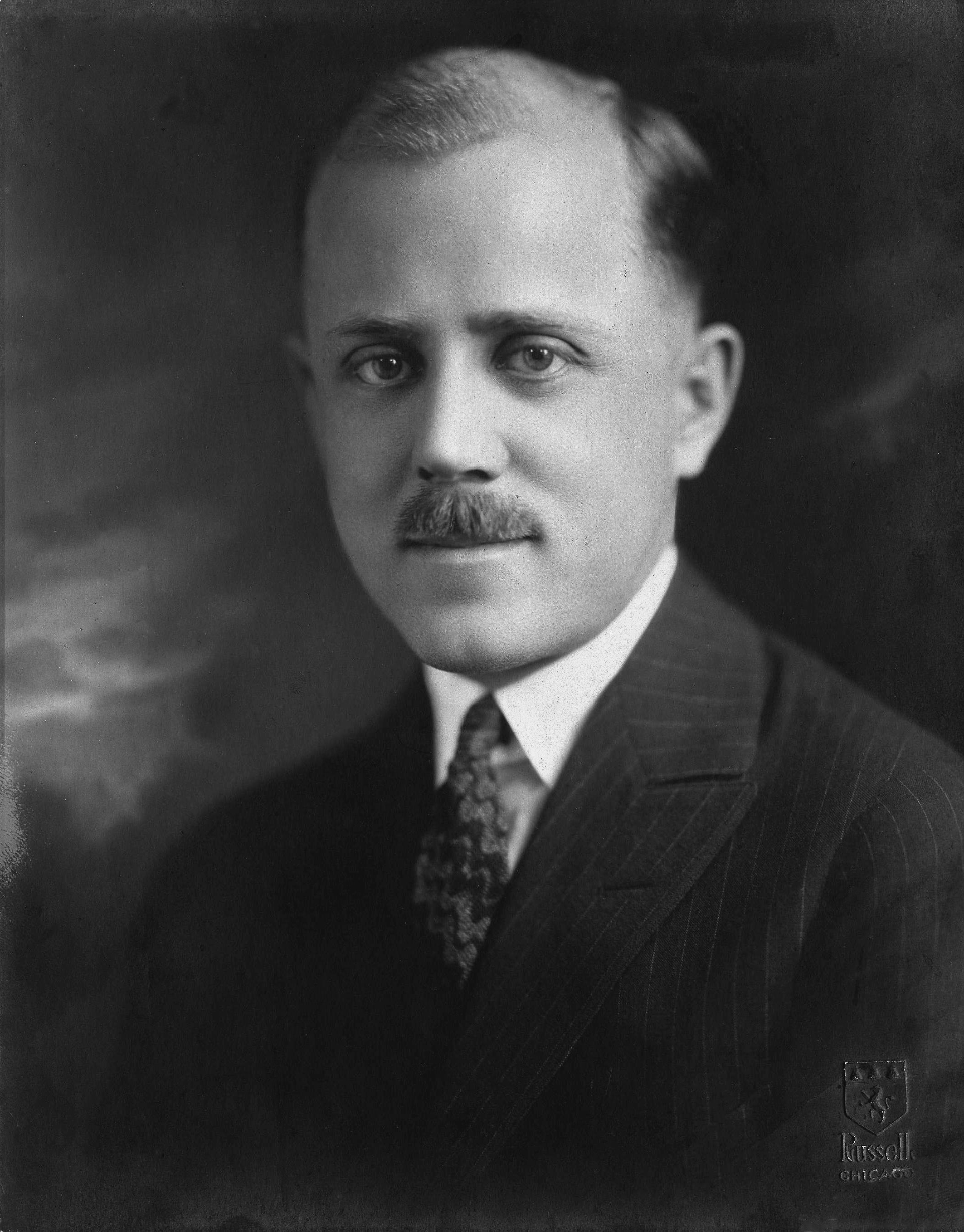
1922 photo of Eskimo Pie inventor Christian Kent Nelson, who partnered with Russell Stover to develop the product

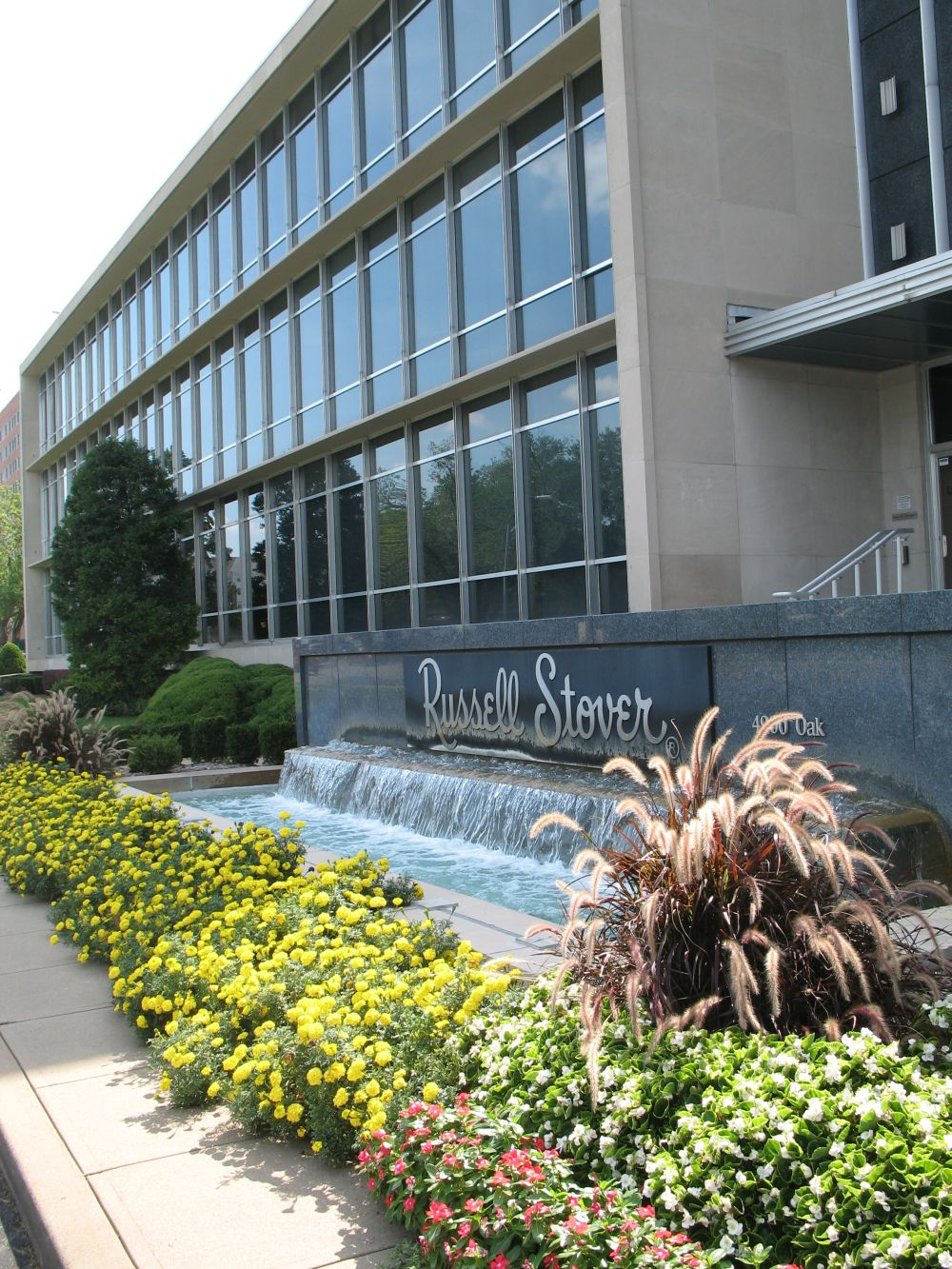
Russell Stover headquarters in Kansas City, Missouri

Russell Stover Chocolates, Inc. is an American manufacturer of candy, chocolate, and confections. Founded by Russell Stover, an American chemist and entrepreneur, and his wife, Clara, in 1923. It is an independent subsidiary of Swiss chocolatier Lindt & Sprüngli. The Kansas City, Missouri-based company was acquired from the Ward family in July 2014 for $1.6 billion.

== History ==
In 1921, Russell Stover and his partner at the time, the Eskimo Pie inventor Christian Kent Nelson, an Iowa schoolteacher, created a chocolate-dipped ice cream sandwich. The product proved successful, and was licensed to manufacturers to produce it.

When other companies soon began to release similar chocolate-dipped ice cream products, Russell Stover was nearly forced out of business. The Stovers sold their share of the company for $25,000 and moved to Denver, Colorado. In 1923, Russell and Clara created a new company from their home, Mrs. Stover's Bungalow Candies, which packaged and sold boxed chocolates. In 1943 it was renamed Russell Stover Candies.

=== Expansion ===
Louis Ward and a partner bought the company for $7.5 million in 1960. He served as the company's chairman and president until 1993, when he retired after suffering a stroke. His sons, Scott H. and Thomas Ward, took over the business. The company expanded its chocolate brands by acquiring Whitman's that year and Pangburn's in 1999.

=== Acquisition by Lindt & Sprüngli and restructuring ===
Swiss chocolate maker Lindt bought Russell Stover Chocolates from the Ward family on July 14, 2014. Integrating Russell Stover Chocolates into Lindt group resulted in a structural reorganization of the company; this included tripling its marketing team and shifting focus away from seasonal products.

Attention was also given to developing its offering of sugar-free products. Stevia, a natural sweetener, replaced the artificial sweetener sucralose by 2019, and the packaging was redesigned to attract a wider audience, hoping to reverse a three-year trend of declining sales. In 2020, Russell Stover Chocolates was the top sugar-free chocolate company in the United States.

Spurred by strong sales in 2019, Russell Stover Chocolates announced plans to expand its Iola, Kansas, Abilene, Kansas, and Corsicana, Texas facilities. It also announced that its facility in Montrose, Colorado and several retail stores and distribution centers across the US would close in 2021.

=== 2020–present ===
The company was among those that participated in a July 2020 virtual job fair hosted by the Kansas public workforce program, designed to allow jobseekers impacted by the COVID pandemic to find employment while still practicing social distancing measures.

In September 2020 the company laid off 300 employees, due to the effects of the pandemic. The closure of the Montrose plant eliminated around 300 jobs.

In April 2021, Russell Stover entered an agreement with Topeka Correctional Facility to form a work release program, hiring 150 inmates to work at their Iola and Abilene facilities in Kansas. This happened as part of a general response from US employers to a perceived labor shortage related to the pandemic.
