= Emporia State University School of Business and Technology =

Business school of the Emporia State University

- Type: Business school
- Established: 1917
- Parent institution: Emporia State University
- Dean: Ed Bashasw
- Location: Emporia, Kansas, U.S. 38.417684°N 96.180722°W
- Website: www.emporia.edu/school-business/

The Emporia State University School of Business and Technology is a public business school located on the main campus of the Emporia State University in Emporia, Kansas that is accredited by the Association to Advance Collegiate Schools of Business, and was founded in 1917.

== Student organizations and programs ==
There are seven student organizations for School of Business students to be involved in, several of which include fraternities or sororities.

- Beta Alpha Psi
- Beta Gamma Sigma
- IS Club
- MBA Association
- Phi Beta Lambda
- Pi Omega Pi
- Marketing Club
- Enactus

=== Koch Center for Leadership and Ethics ===
The Koch Center for Leadership and Ethics focuses on the ethics within the business world. The School of Business received a quarter of a million dollar grant from the Fred and Mary Koch Foundation and Koch Industries. It has since disbanded.

=== Small Business Development Center ===
The Small Business Development Center trains students and the public on how to start a business.

== Notable alumni ==
- William Coffin Coleman – founder of Coleman Company. Taught school at Ottawa University for a year before serving as principal of Blue Rapids schools for a year. Coleman also served as mayor of Wichita in 1923 and 1924.
