= Ice cream bar =

Frozen dessert on a stick

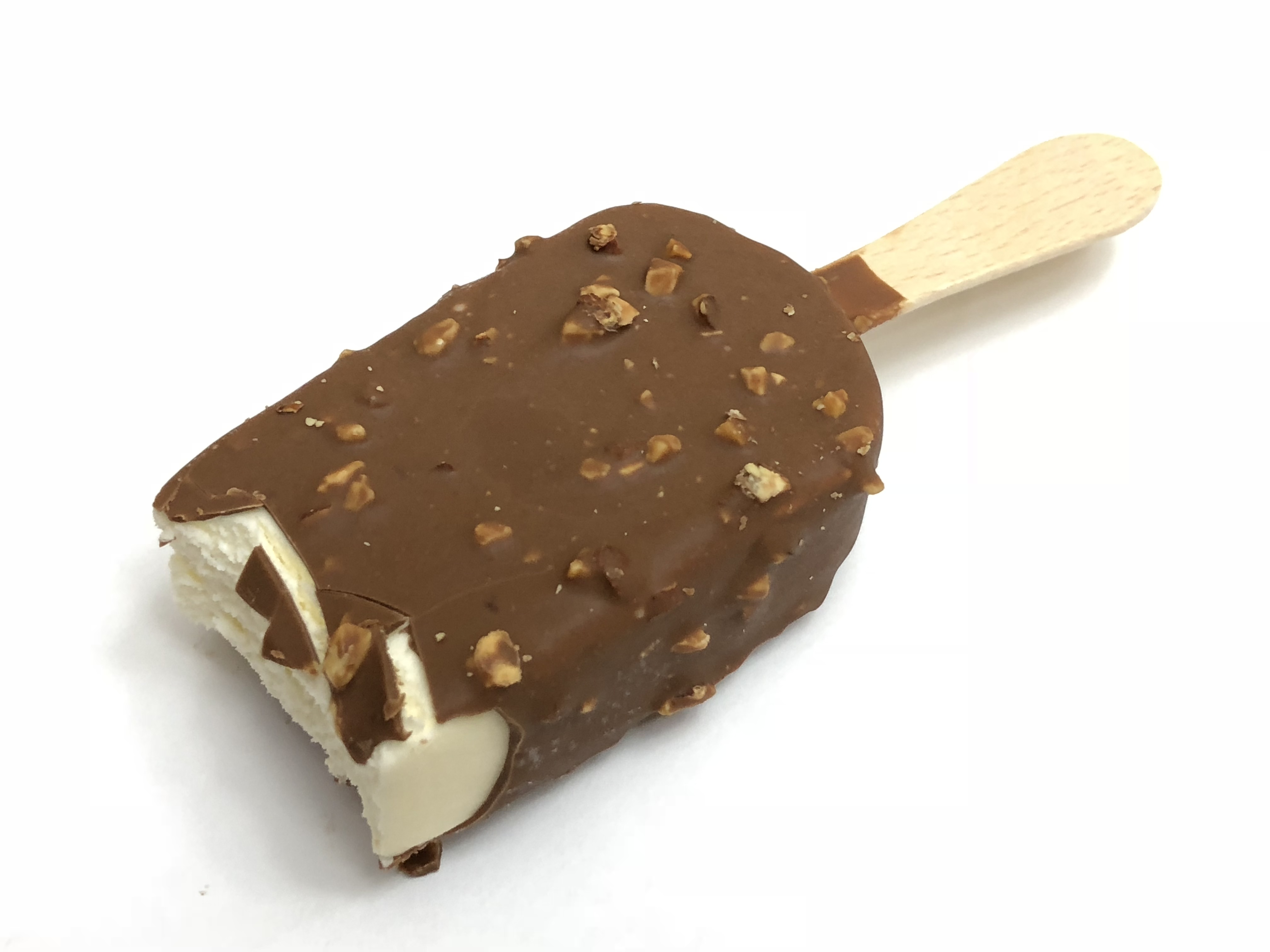
- Course: Dessert
- Serving temperature: Cold
- Main ingredients: Ice cream

An ice cream bar is a frozen dessert featuring ice cream on a stick. The confection was patented in the US in the 1920s, with one invalidated in 1928.

== Description ==
An ice cream bar is a frozen dessert on a stick. It features ice cream, distinguishing it from an ice pop, which does not contain any ice cream. Ice cream bars are often dipped and covered in chocolate.

== History ==
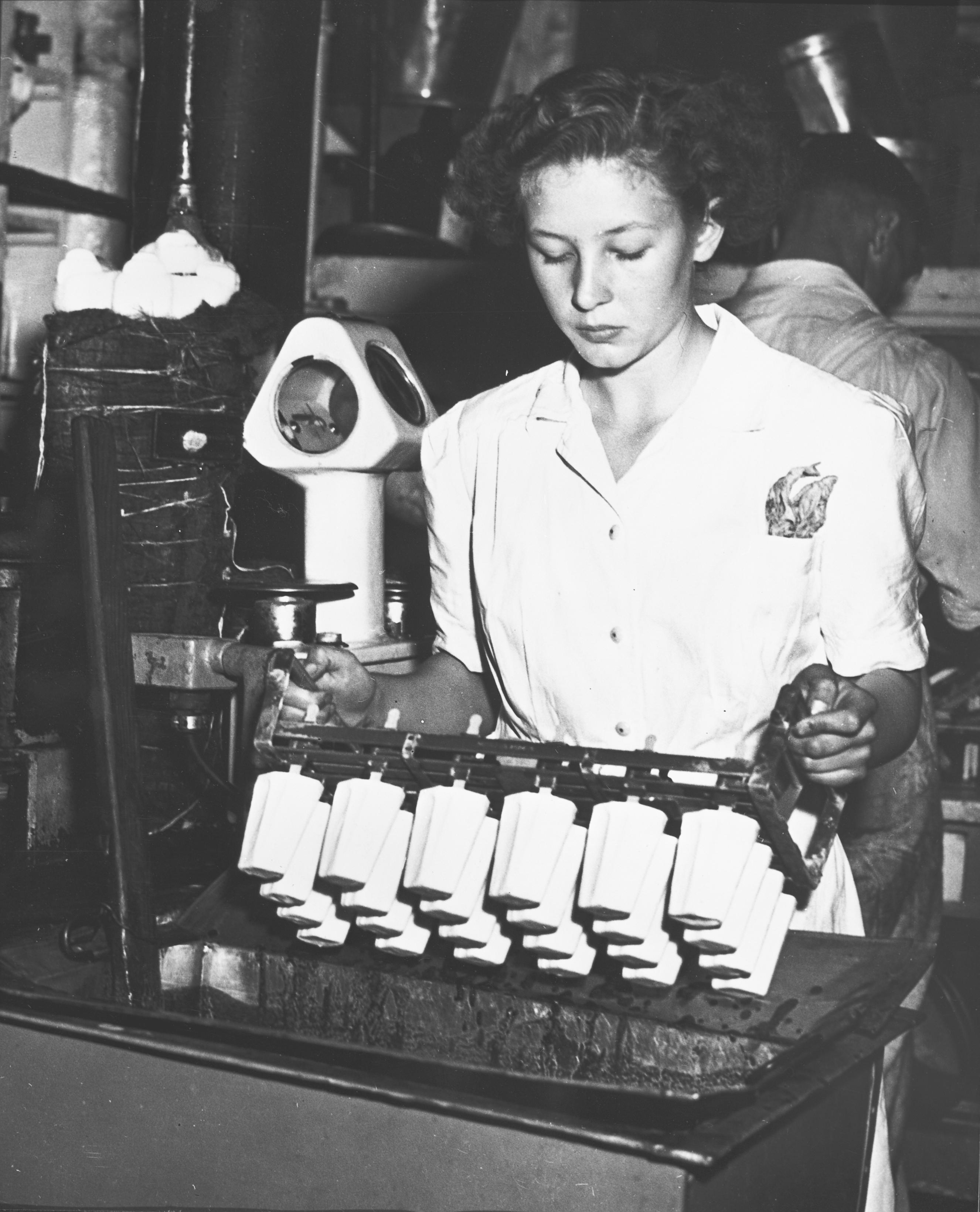
Making ice cream bars

In the US, the Eskimo Pie chocolate bar was invented in Iowa by a pharmacy owner named Chris Nelson, who was inspired by a boy named Douglas Ressenden who could not decide between candy and ice cream. They were named "I-Scream-Bars" in the original test run. One of the earliest advertisements for Eskimo Pies appeared in the November 3, 1921 issue of the Iowa City Press-Citizen. A patent was awarded in 1922, but invalidated in 1928.

According to the Good Humor ice cream company, confectioner Harry Burt invented ice cream on a stick in 1920, and was granted a patent in 1923. This product also was enrobed in chocolate, and other products were produced.

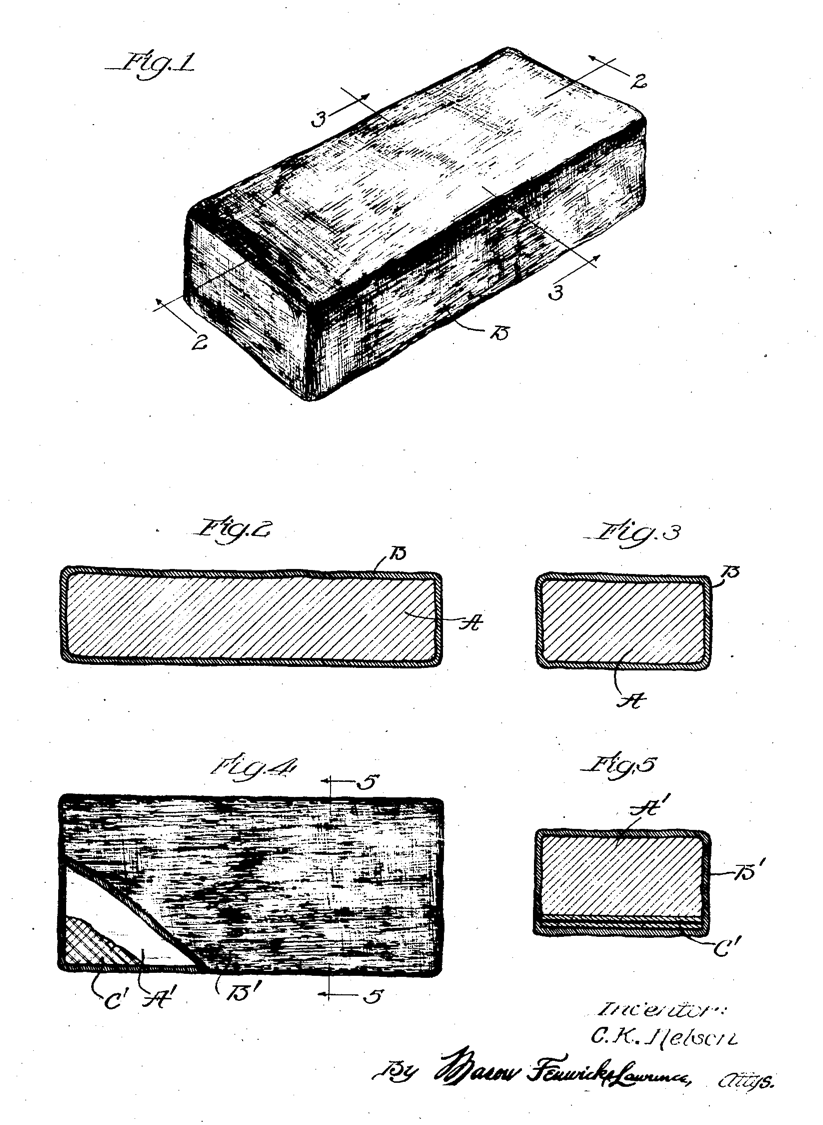
Chris Nelson's drawing from his patent

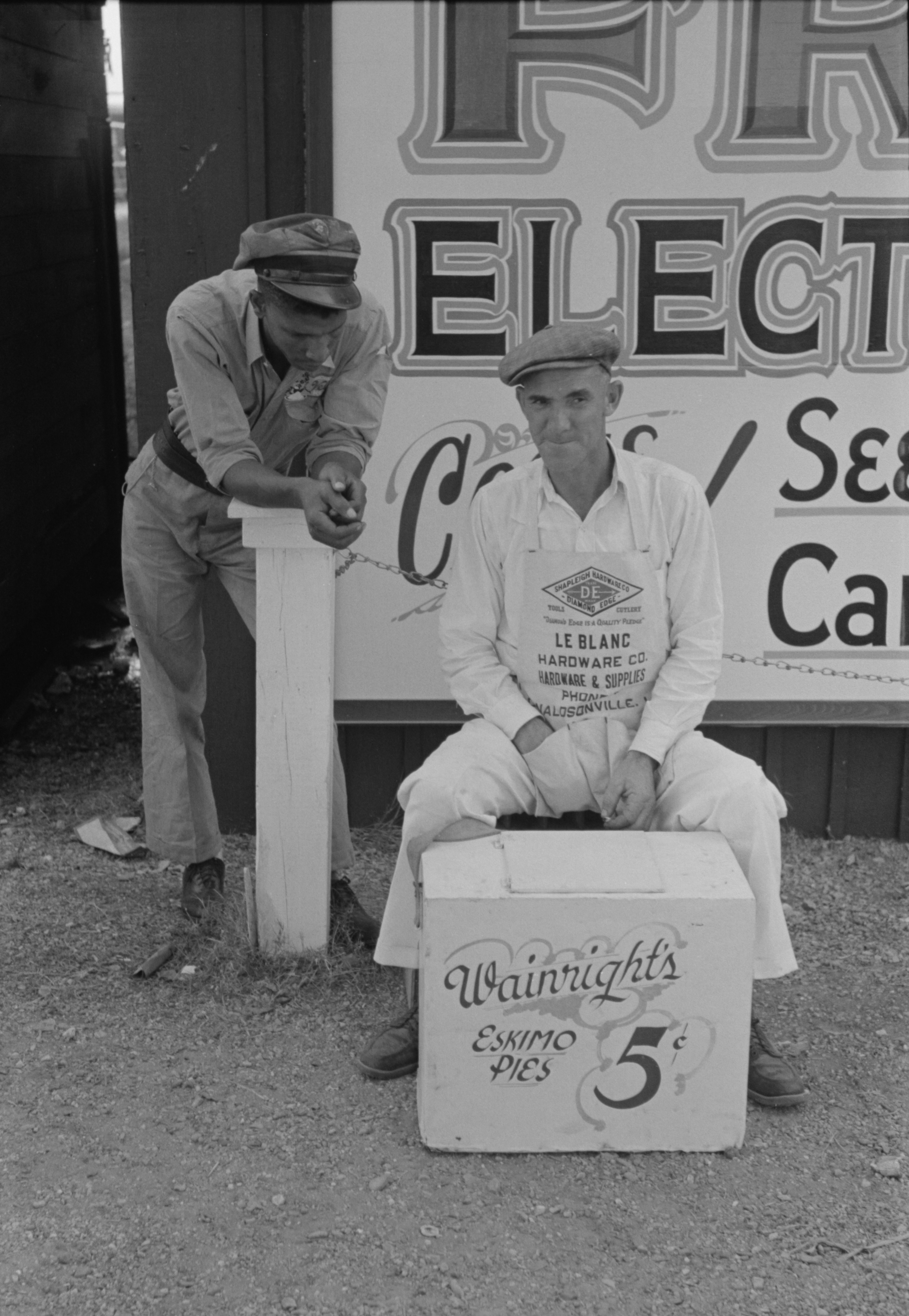
Man selling Eskimo Pies in Louisiana, 1938

== Gallery ==
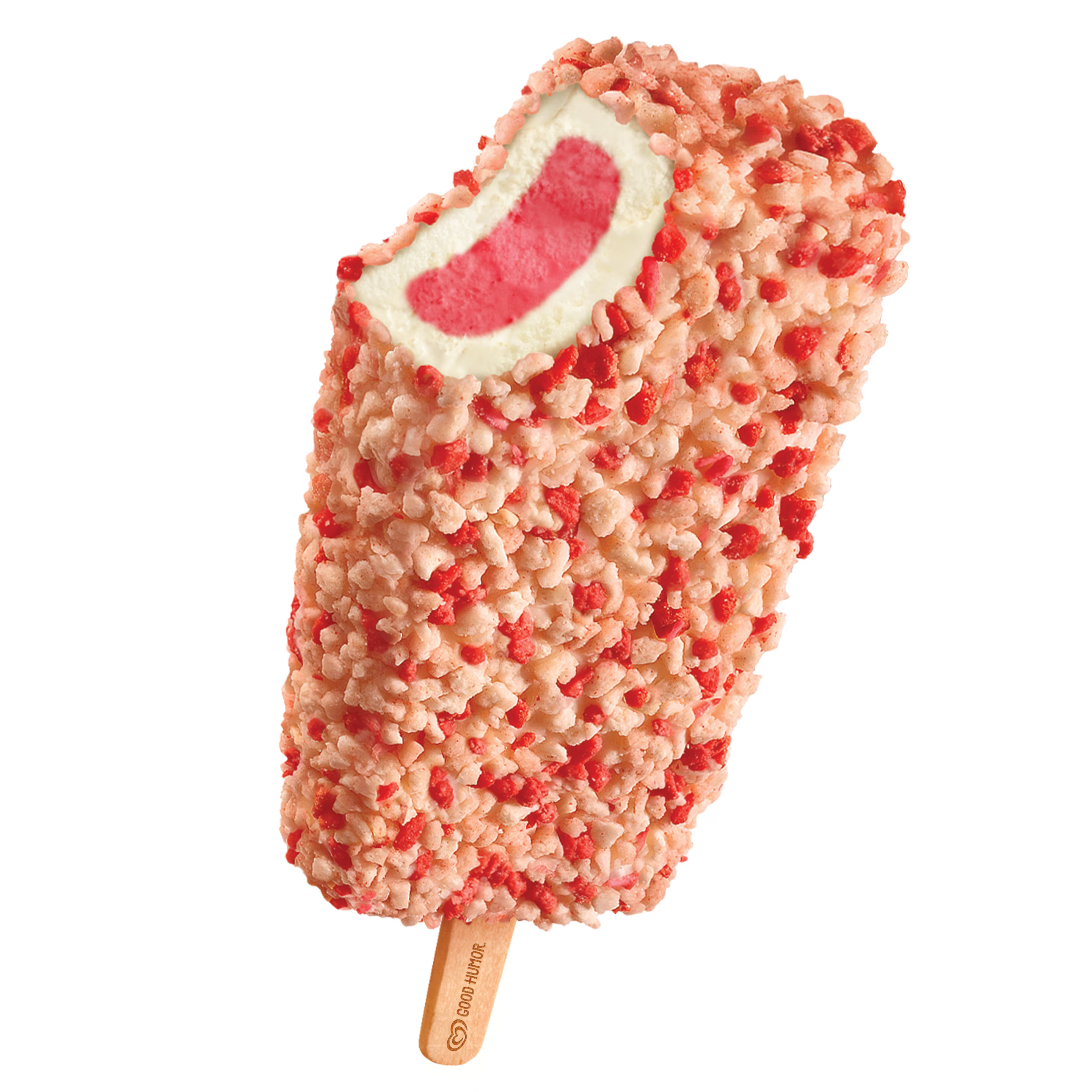
Strawberry shortcake ice cream bar

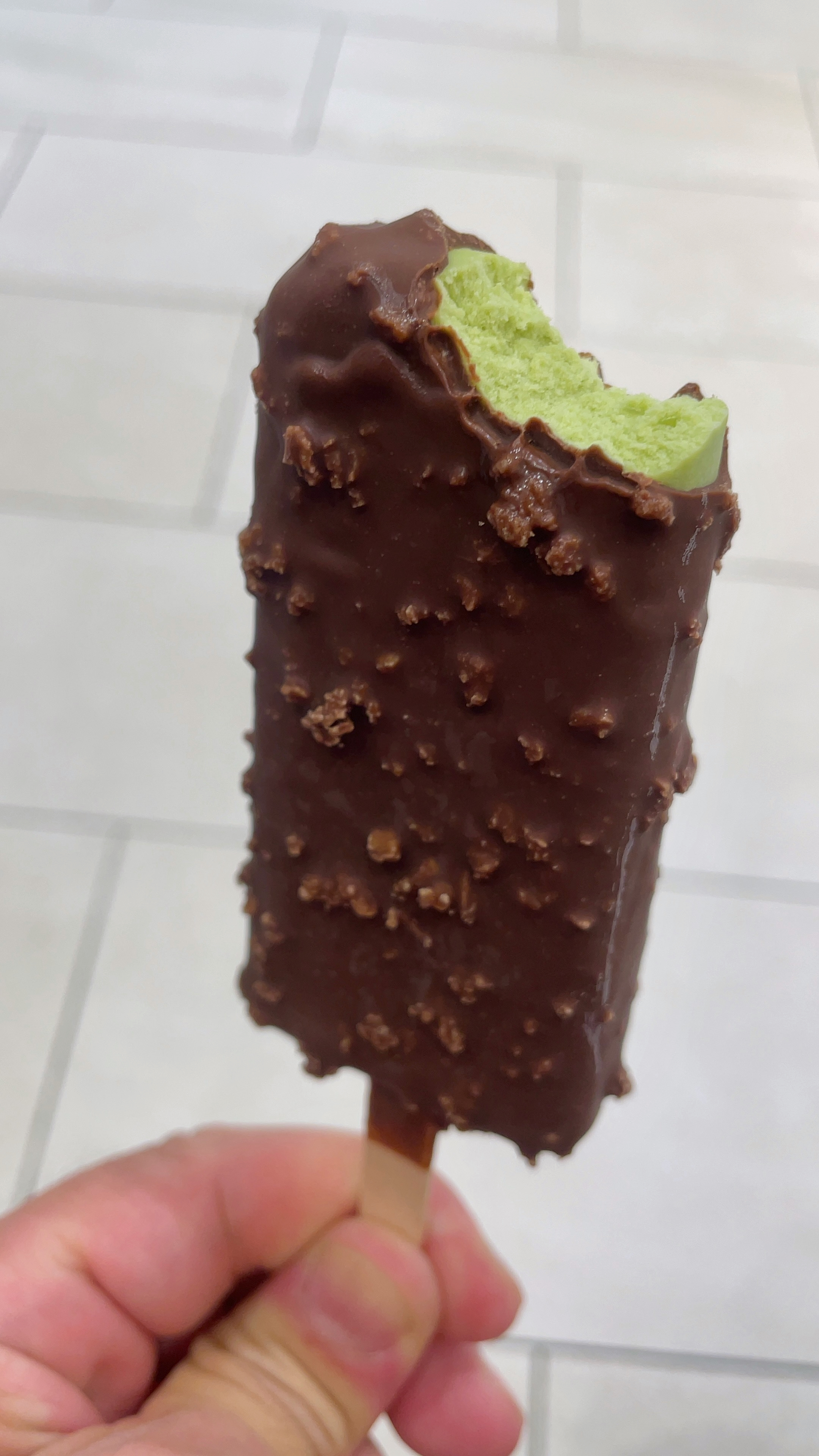
Green tea ice cream bar

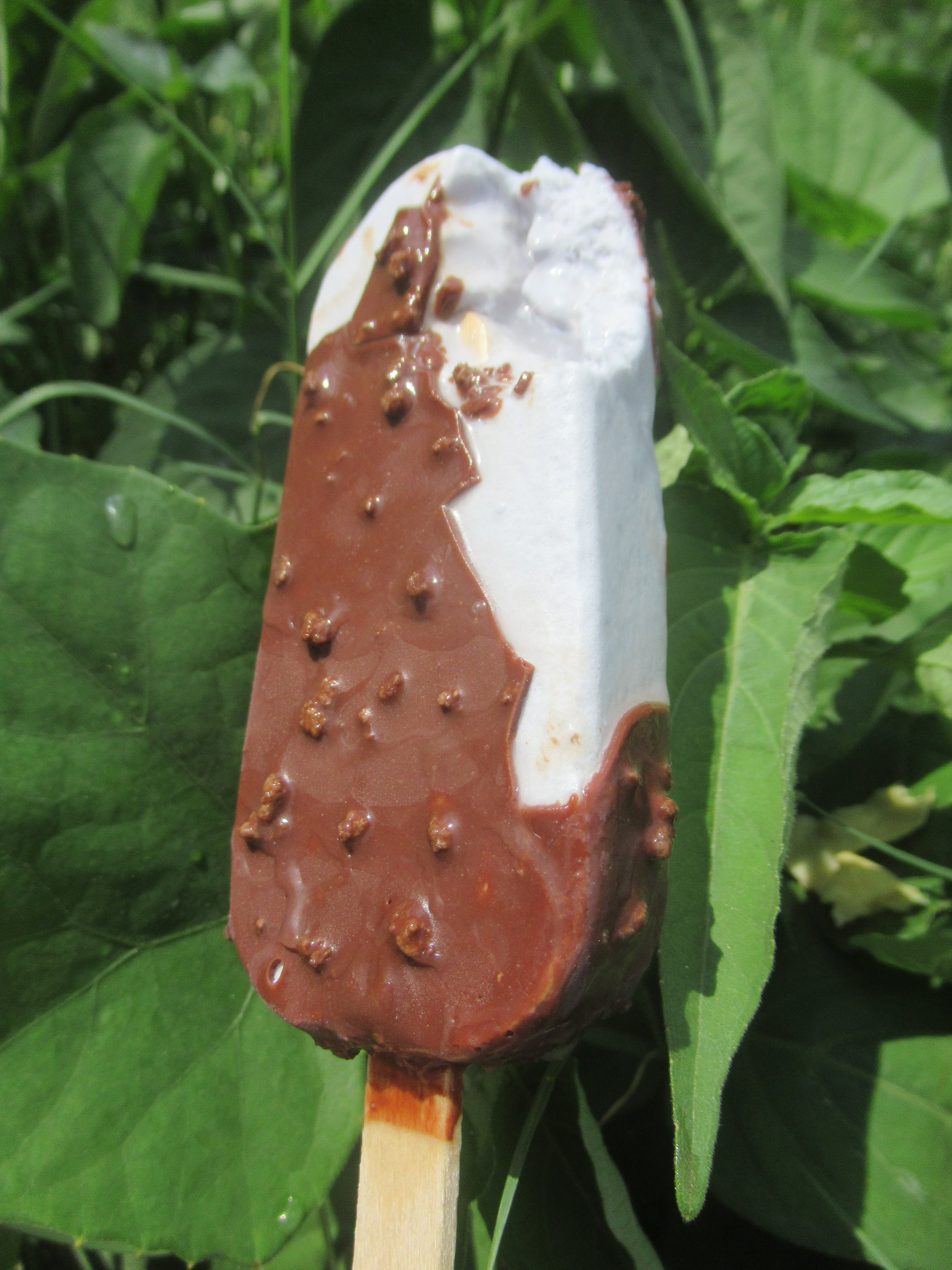
Taro ice cream bar

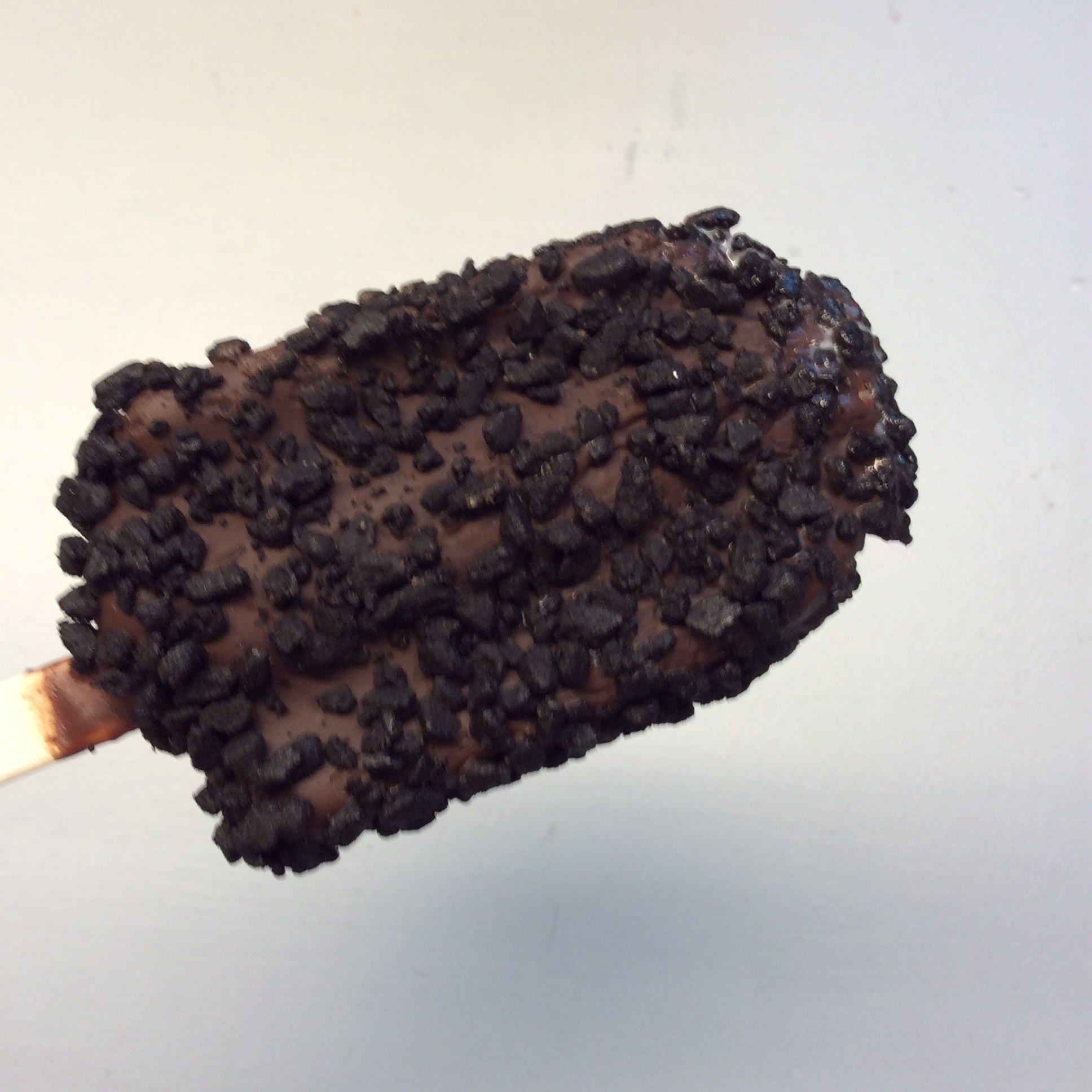
Crunky ice cream bar

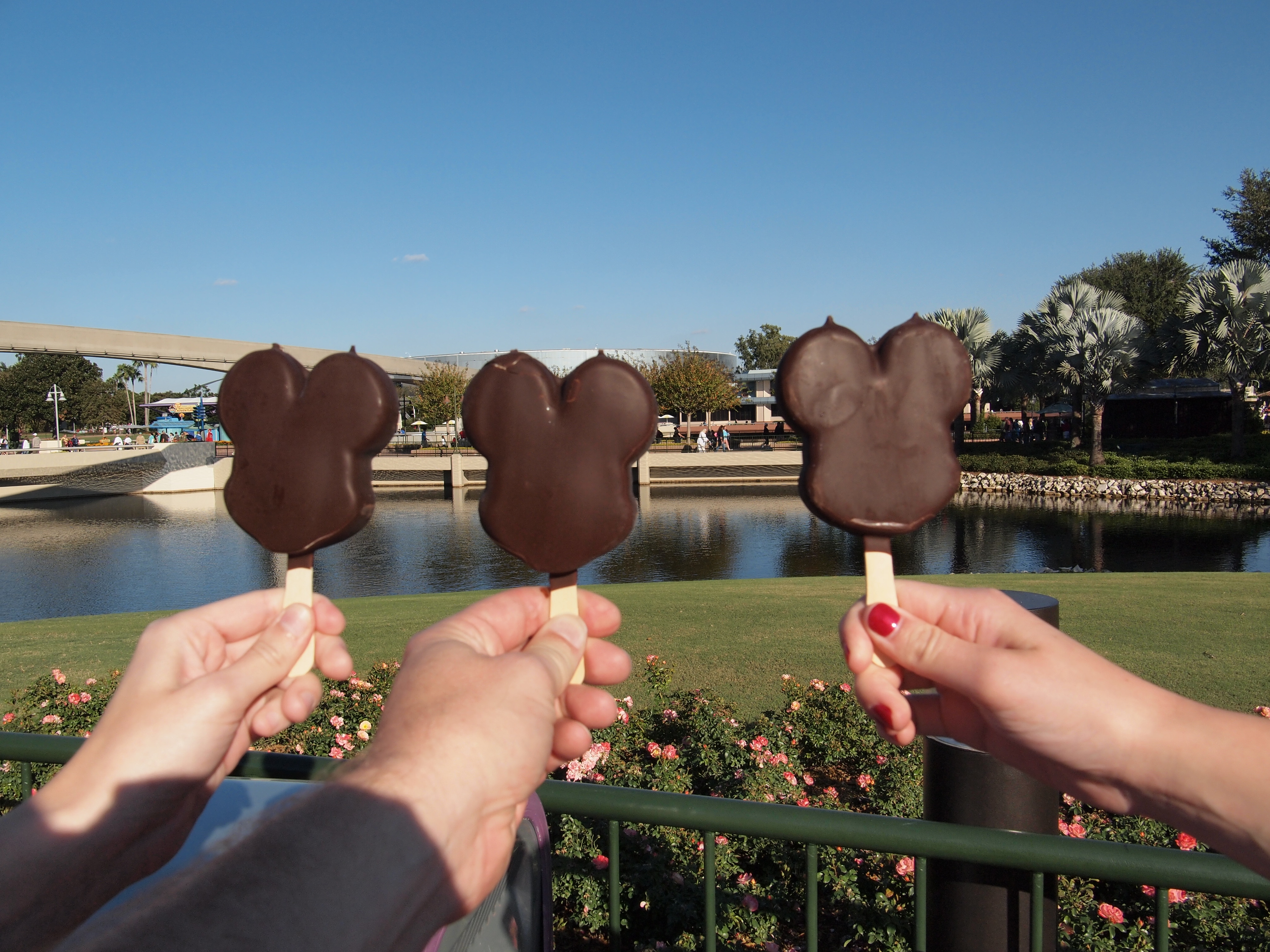
Ice cream bars shaped like the silhouette of Mickey Mouse's head.

== See also ==
- Choc ice
- Magnum
