= List of Emporia State University people =

Emporia State's "Power E" logo

Emporia State University is a public university in Emporia, Kansas, United States, east of the Flint Hills. Established in March 1863 and originally known as the Kansas State Normal School, Emporia State is the third-oldest public university in the state of Kansas. Emporia State is one of six public universities governed by the Kansas Board of Regents.

== Notable alumni ==
=== Academics ===
- H. Edward Flentje – professor at Wichita State University; interim president of Emporia State University
- Ken Hush – Emporia State's 18th president; held multiple executive positions at Koch Minerals and Carbon
- Harry Levinson – chairman emeritus and founder of the Levinson Institute; clinical professor of psychology (emeritus) at Harvard Medical School
- Barbara Kiefer Lewalski – Guggenheim Fellow in 1967; William R. Kenan, Jr. Professor of History and Literature and of English, emeritus at Harvard University
- W. Ann Reynolds – chancellor of the California State University and City University of New York
- Jackie Vietti – president of Butler Community College for 17 years; interim president of Emporia State University in 2015
- Lloyd P. Young, president of what is now Keene State College

=== Art ===
- James Pringle Cook – Western landscape painter
- Barry Johnson – artist
- Evan Lindquist – artist given Lifetime Achievement Award by the Society of American Graphic Artists (SAGA) in 2010

=== Business ===
- Dan Busby – president of the Evangelical Council for Financial Accountability
- William Coffin Coleman – founder of Coleman Company; taught at Ottawa University for a year before serving as principal of Blue Rapids schools for a year; mayor of Wichita in 1923 and 1924

=== Entertainment ===
- Kay Alden – five-time Emmy award-winning television writer
- Curt Dawson (1960) – stage and television actor
- Katie A. Keane – theatrical/television actress

=== Law ===
- Dale Emerson Saffels – United States District Court for the District of Kansas; member of the Kansas House of Representatives
- Harold See – associate justice of the Alabama Supreme Court
- Sam V. Stewart – Montana Supreme Court justice

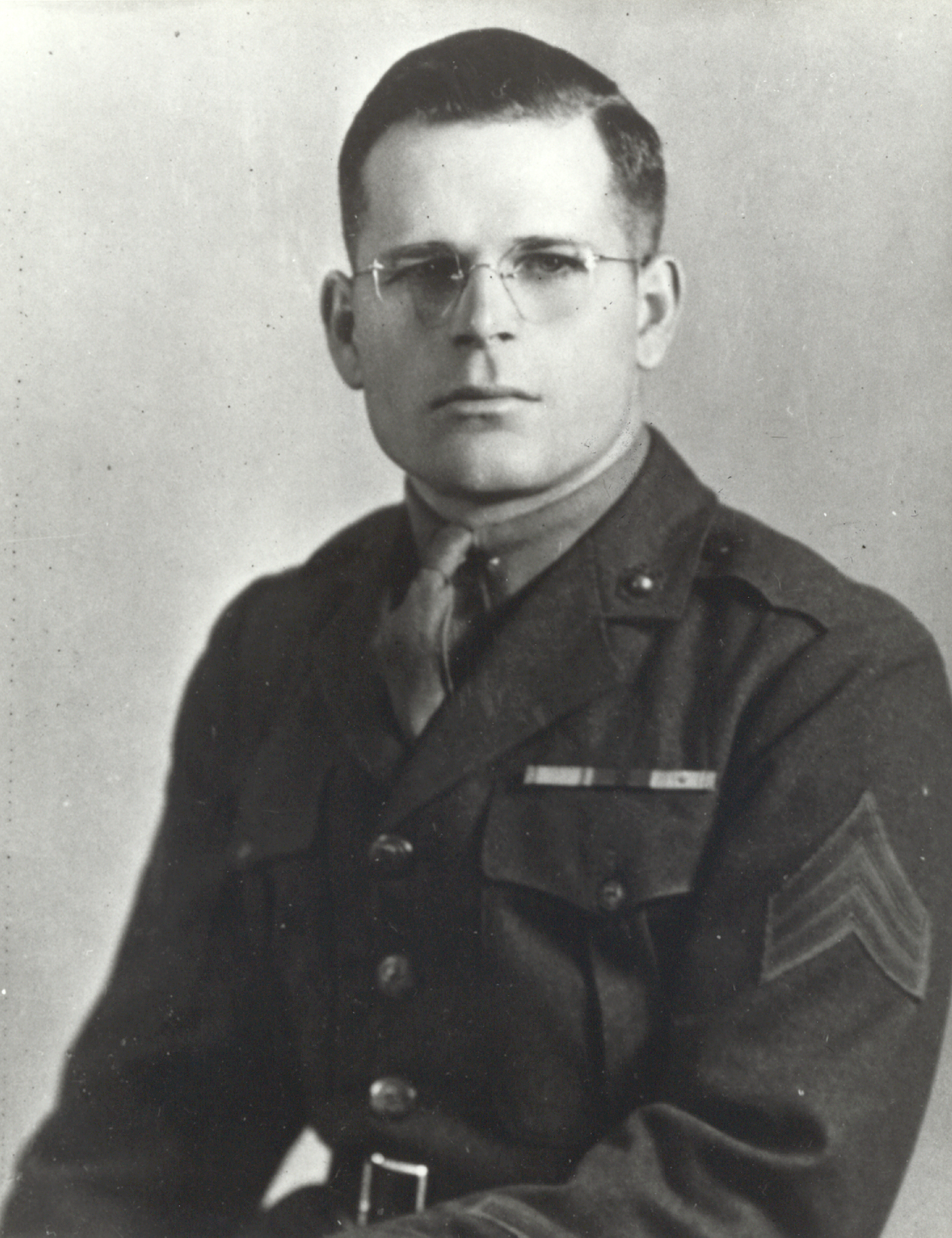
Grant F. Timmerman

=== Military ===
- Roscoe Cartwright – first black field artilleryman promoted to brigadier general
- Grant F. Timmerman – awarded Medal of Honor posthumously for heroism during Battle of Saipan

=== Politics and government ===
- Jim Barnett – physician and former Kansas senator; Republican nominee for governor in 2006
- Stephanie Clayton – member of the Kansas House of Representatives
- William J. Durham – attorney and leader in the civil rights movement
- Thompson Benton Ferguson – governor of Oklahoma Territory (1901–1906)
- Stan Frownfelter – member of the Kansas House of Representatives
- L. M. Gensman – former U.S. representative from Oklahoma
- Lea Giménez – Minister of Finance (Paraguay)
- Jim Kelly – member of the Kansas House of Representatives
- Jeff Longbine – member of the Kansas Senate
- John Conover Nichols – former U.S. rep. from Oklahoma
- Roy Wilford Riegle – Kansas Senate member
- Mark Schreiber – member of the Kansas House of Representatives
- Jack Sinagra – mayor, state senator, chair of Port Authority of New York and New Jersey
- Vern Swanson – Kansas House of Representatives House District 64
- Annie Tietze – Kansas House of Representatives House District 53
- Mark Treaster – former member of Kansas House of Representatives
- Ed Trimmer – Kansas House of Representatives House District 79
- Bob Whittaker – United States House of Representatives

=== Literature ===
- Louis F. Burns – Osage Nation/Osage Indian historian and author
- Hattie Horner Louthan – author of five books and contributor to newspapers and magazines
- Deborah Raney – women's fiction writer
- Randall J. Stephens – author and historian

=== Science and technology ===
- William T. Frankenberger – soil scientist
- Panos Zavos – reproduction specialist

=== Sports ===
- Frank Anderson – former head baseball coach for the Oklahoma State Cowboys, now an assistant for the University of Tennessee
- Ross Bjork – two-year starter at fullback on ESU Hornet football team, former athletic director at University of Mississippi; former athletic director at Texas A&M University; current athletic director at Ohio State University
- Dale Burnett – former NFL player; played for the New York Giants and was on 1932 World Championship team
- Glenn Campbell – NFL player for New York Giants, Philadelphia Eagles and Pittsburgh Pirates
- Jory Collins – 6th head women's basketball coach at Emporia State 2010–2018
- Eldon Danenhauer – NFL player for Denver Broncos
- John Davis – NFL player for Tampa Bay Buccaneers, Minnesota Vikings and Chicago Bears
- Don Dennis – pitched for St. Louis Cardinals in 1965 and 1966
- Al Feuerbach – former Olympian and world record holder in the shot put
- Bob Fornelli – head baseball coach at Emporia State (2004–2018)
- Kelly Goodburn – NFL player for Kansas City Chiefs and Washington Redskins; played in XXIV Super Bowl when Washington won World Championship

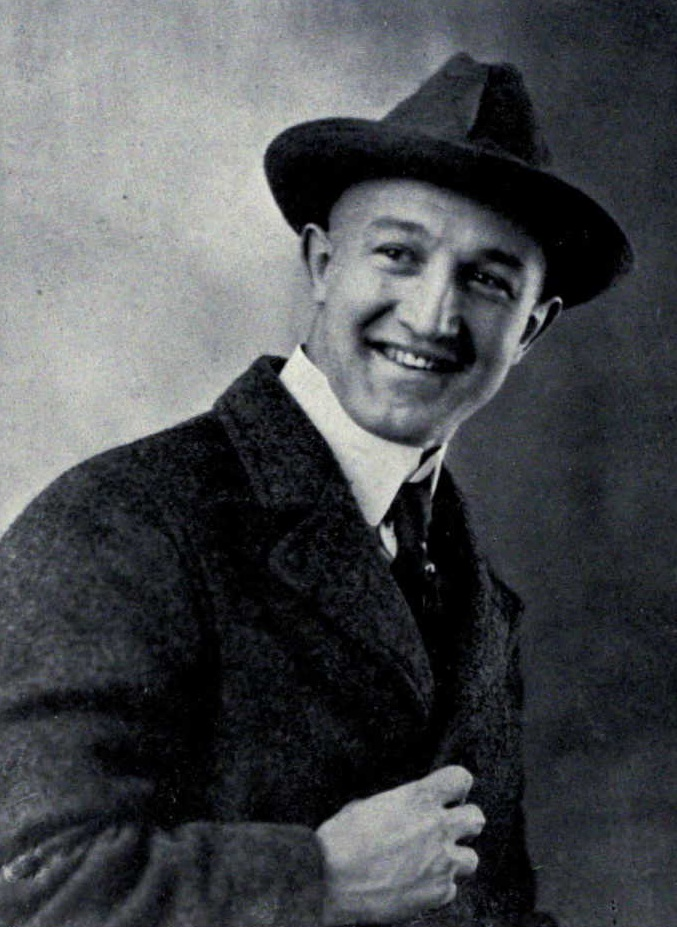
Homer Woodson Hargiss

- Homer Woodson Hargiss – head football coach for 12 years and compiled a 62-23-11 record; his 1926 squad produced a 7-0-0 record, the only perfect season in ESU history
- Steve Henry – drafted by the NFL St. Louis Cardinals in 1979; played one year each for the Cardinals, the New York Giants, and the Baltimore Colts
- Garin Higgins – current head football coach at Emporia State
- Brad Hill – head baseball coach at Kansas State University (2004–2018)
- Gene Johnson – head basketball coach at Wichita State University and Kansas Wesleyan University, won two AAU national titles and was assistant coach for the 1936 gold medal Olympic basketball team; credited with inventing the full-court zone press
- Fred Kipp – played baseball for the New York Yankees, Brooklyn Dodgers, and Los Angeles Dodgers
- Ryan Kohlmeier – played on various Major League Baseball teams, as well as Minor League Baseball teams; current dentist in Emporia, KS
- John Kuck – gold medal winner in the shot put at the 1928 Summer Olympics in Amsterdam
- Bob Leahy – played in the NFL for the Pittsburgh Steelers and also coached in the NFL
- Leon Lett – helped Hornets to the NAIA National Championship game in 1989; played for Dallas Cowboys in 3 Super Bowls
- John Lohmeyer – defensive end for Emporia State and former Kansas City Chiefs player; currently Director of Development for the Emporia State University foundation
- George Munday – NFL player for Cleveland Indians, New York Giants, Cincinnati Reds and St. Louis Gunners
- Archie San Romani – won the national collegiate mile in 1935 and the 1,500-meter run in 1936; anchored distance medley relay that set world record in 1936; was fourth in the 1,500-meter run at the 1936 Olympics in Berlin; set a world record in the 2,000-meter run in 1937 that stood for 25 years
- Brian Shay – running back for ESU; won the 1998 Harlon Hill Trophy; broke 17 NCAA Division II records; played for the Berlin Thunder and Orlando Rage; was a member of the 1999 Kansas City Chiefs practice squad
- Steve Shifflett – major league baseball player for Kansas City Royals
- Harry Short – baseball player and manager
- Bill Tidwell – four-time NAIA national cross country champion; Emporia State athletics director 1971–1979, cross country and track & field coach 1979–1984
- Fran Welch – quarterbacked ESU football team to a 24-1-2 record; in 24 years as a football coach, compiled a 116-81-15 mark; his track and cross country teams claimed 18 league crowns, four NAIA cross country championships, one NAIA track title, and one NCAA small college cross country title
- Austin Willis – football player

== Presidents ==
These persons have served as presidents or interim presidents of Kansas State Normal School (1863–1923), Kansas State Teachers College (1923–1974), Emporia Kansas State College (1974–1977), and Emporia State University (1977–present).

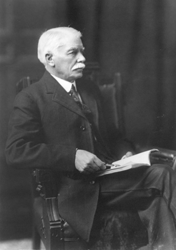
Lyman Beecher Kellogg:
1st president of Kansas State Normal School

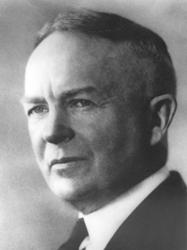
Thomas W. Butcher:
8th president of Kansas State Teachers College

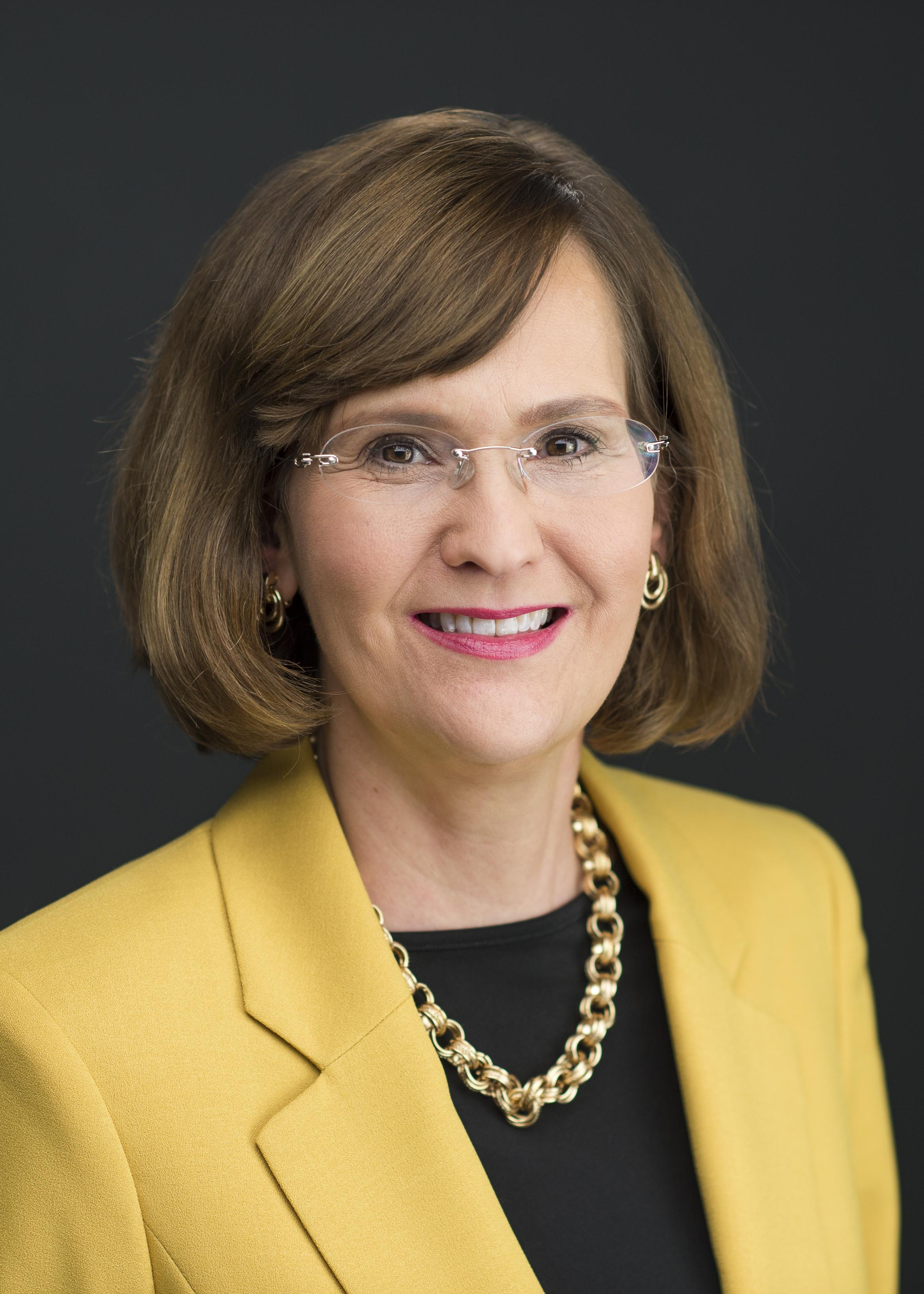
Allison Garrett:
17th president of Emporia State University

== See also ==
- Lists of people from Kansas
- Emporia State University School of Business
- Emporia State University Teachers College
- Emporia State Hornets
  - List of Emporia State Hornets head football coaches
  - Emporia State Hornets basketball
