= President of Emporia State University =

- Seal of the President
- Incumbent; Matt Baker since March 2, 2026
- Emporia State University
- Residence: Emporia, Kansas
- Appointer: Kansas Board of Regents
- Formation: February 15, 1865
- First holder: Lyman Beecher Kellogg
- Website: Office of the President

The President of Emporia State University is the chief administrator of the university. Each is appointed by and is responsible to the other members of that body, who delegate to him or her the day-to-day running of the university. The president of Emporia State is selected by the Kansas Board of Regents, the governing board for public universities in the state of Kansas, after a nationwide search.

Emporia State University is a public university in Emporia, Kansas, United States, east of the Flint Hills. Established in March 1863 and originally known as the Kansas State Normal School, Emporia State is the third oldest public university in the state of Kansas. Emporia State is one of six public universities governed by the Kansas Board of Regents. The university offers degrees in more than 80 courses of study through 4 colleges: the School of Business, College of Liberal Arts and Sciences, School of Library and Information Management, and The Teachers College. The Teachers College is one of only four post–secondary institutions in the nation to be identified as an Exemplary Model Teacher Education program by Arthur Levine in his 2006 national study of teacher education programs.

To date, the youngest president of Emporia State University has been Lyman Beecher Kellogg, who was the first president of what was the Kansas State Normal. When appointed as the first president of the new state normal school in January 1865, he was only 23 years old. The longest-serving president of the university was Thomas W. Butcher, who held the office for thirty years from 1913 to 1943. The first university alumnus to become its president was Joseph H. Hill in 1906.

As of 17 September 2026, Emporia State is led by Matthew Baker, who assumed his position on March 2, 2026, after his appointment was announced in December 2025.

Prior to Baker, Ken Hush served as the 18th president from June 2022 to December 2025. Garrett replaced the sixteenth president, Michael Shonrock, and interim president, Jackie Vietti, and assumed her position on January 4, 2016. Garrett, who was previously the executive vice president at Abilene Christian University, was selected as Emporia State University's 17th president on October 22, 2015. Using the university's counting method (interim presidents are not numbered), Garrett was the seventeenth president of the university. Seventeen men and two women have served as the university's permanent president, and four men and two women have served as its interim president pending the appointment of a permanent successor.

Each president is a qualified academic professor in some department of the university and will, on occasion, teach courses.

== List of presidents ==
These persons have served as presidents or interim presidents of Kansas State Normal School (1863–1923), Kansas State Teachers College (1923–1974), Emporia Kansas State College (1974–1977), and Emporia State University (1977–present).

Presidents of Emporia State University
No.	Portrait	President	Tenure	Background and accomplishments
Kansas State Normal School (1863–1923)
1		Lyman Beecher Kellogg	1865–71	Kellogg was the first president of the newly established normal school in Kansas, and he opened the first class of 18 students with the Lord's Prayer on February 15, 1865. Because funding, facilities, and teaching materials were limited, Kellogg was the only teacher besides being the president and emphasized in Latin and English. In fall of 1865, he added Henry Brace Norton, also an Illinois Normal University graduate, to the faculty.
2		George W. Hoss	1871–73	Hoss was able to secure funds from the state legislature to construct a new building, as the number of enrolled students had increased to 200; however, the assembly room in the old building could only accommodate 100. In 1872, Hoss invited members of the state House of Representatives to visit the KSN. The day after their visit, the House passed a $50,000 appropriation, with the provision that the city provide $10,000. The new building was constructed in front of the old building, facing Commercial street, during the fall and winter of 1871 to 1872.
3		Charles Rhodes Pomeroy	1874–79	Pomeroy served as president during a financial crisis forcing him to work without salary, the only unpaid president. Pomeroy also had no funds to work with, either, due to the financial crisis. Faculty worked off a very small salary until July 2, 1879, when the board voted that bonds on the school's lands would be distributed to teachers.
4		Rudolph B. Welch	1879–82	Welch's administration was housed in two temporary buildings due to a fire and tornado in 1878. Welch traveled the state of Kansas to promote the school and under Welch's management, the school saw a notable increase in attendance.
5		Albert R. Taylor	1882–1901	Taylor was a president who focused on students and based on that, made an effort to expand the student population by offering reimbursement for students who travelled 100+ miles to attend the school. Taylor also established programs which included 10-week sessions, summer school, commercial courses, and military drills. He also upgraded the history, economics, and psychology departments.
6		Jasper N. Wilkinson	1901–06	During Wilkinson's term, he forbid students failing to continue their program at the school and changed the policies of earning a degree. In the fall of 1901, the men's basketball team competed in its first game at the school. In 1903, a new library was opened.
7		Joseph H. Hill	1906–13	Hill, the university's first alumnus president, was able to build two new buildings on campus and have them opened including the science hall in 1907 and a gymnasium. The other new building that opened during Hill's administration was the new gymnasium, opening in 1910. In 1909, a $20,000 approval to purchase and reconstruct a property on the east side of campus to house the music department was granted from the Kansas State Legislature.
Kansas State Teachers College (1923–1974)
8		Thomas W. Butcher	1913–43	Butcher, Emporia State's longest serving president to this day, accomplished many things while at the Kansas State Teachers College. In 1914, a "work study" program was started, which is still used today. The new four stories high administrative building, named Plumb Hall, was completed in 1917. It also houses a 2,500-seat auditorium, named Albert Taylor Hall after the fifth president of KSN Albert R. Taylor. Under Butcher's administration, the Memorial Union was built in 1922, and in 1938 a new football stadium, later named Francis G. Welch Stadium, was completed.
9		James F. Price	1943–45	Price was president during World War II. Price created many committees during his tenure to focus on the needs of the students.
10		David L. MacFarlane	1945–53	MacFarlane was able to gain funds to build the William Allen White Library on the south side of campus and build new residence halls on the north side of campus. In 1952, MacFarlane suffered from heart problems and later died on January 3, 1953, while still in office, making him the first, and only first sitting president at Emporia State to die in office.
–		John Jacobs (interim)	1953	Jacobs became the first interim president of KSTC after MacFarlane died of heart problems. Jacobs began on January 16, 1953, and his last day at KSTC was July 31, 1953.
11		John E. King	1953–66	King served 13 years as president and oversaw KSTC's enrollment increase to the school's largest enrollment in school history. Scholarships were also increased in number.
–		Larry Boylan (interim)	1966–67	Boylan served as the interim president of KSTC from August 1966 to February 1967.
Emporia Kansas State College (1974–1977) and Emporia State University (April 1977–present)
12		John E. Visser	1967–84	Visser established both the faculty and student senates and valued strong transparency between the students and administration. Visser also reorganized the school into different academic schools with departments and divisions inside the schools. Visser's also saw the school reach a new enrollment figure of 7,150 students in 1969, the school's largest, as well as helped transition them to a university with name changes in 1974 – Emporia Kansas State College – and to its current name, Emporia State University in April 1977, when the school was granted university status.
13		Robert E. Glennen	1984–97	Glennen began at Emporia State on July 1, 1984, at a time when universities were facing budget cuts – in this case, ESU with $1 million – and ESU was facing declining enrollment, and even the threat of closing of the university. One of his most notable events during Visser's tenure was the establishment of the National Teachers Hall of Fame, a non-profit organization that honors exceptional school teachers throughout the United States.
14		Kay Schallenkamp	1997–2006	Schallenkamp was the first woman president to serve Emporia State University, as well as in the Kansas Board of Regents system. During her tenure at ESU, she was able to keep enrollment stabilized after several years of decline. She also created a brand identity for the university, including the famous "Power E", which is the commonly seen with the athletics teams. The new identity replaced multiple logos and helped make Emporia State more recognizable throughout the world. Schallenkamp also increased the financial pool within the university's foundation and established the Presidential Scholars program with intent to help recruit students for Emporia State.
–		John O. Schwenn (interim)	2006	Schwenn began his career as the Interim President of ESU on July 1, 2006, and serving until October 31, 2006. Previously, Schwenn served multiple positions at Emporia State with holding the office of provost before becoming the interim president.
15		Michael R. Lane	2006–11	Lane began in November 2006 and oversaw the largest on campus renovation project of the Memorial Union. On June 30, 2011, Lane stepped down to return to teaching accounting at Emporia State, after many of the alumni and community members questioned his commitment to the university.
–		H. Edward Flentje (interim)	2011	Flentje began his five-month term on July 1, 2011, as the interim president of Emporia State. He served until December 31, 2011. During Fientje's tenure, he helped establish $7.5 million in new scholarships for new students, freshmen, and transfer students.
16		Michael Shonrock	2012–15	Shonrock began his tenure on January 3, 2012. One year later to kick-off Emporia State's sesquicentennial year, Shonrock and his administration launch the largest fundraising campaign in Emporia State history, with a $45 million goal in five-to-seven years. Also during Shonrock's tenure, Emporia State saw seven consecutive increased semesters of enrollment growth, and received additional money from the Government of Kansas for an honors college. Shonrock also led the development of a campus master plan and The Adaptive University Strategic Plan, instituted a new statewide and regional marketing campaign, and communications with alumni were enhanced and new community partnerships were established. Shonrock also started a bi-weekly radio segment called ESU Buzz on KVOE, which always had guest and discussed a variety of issues and events at Emporia State.
–		Jackie Vietti (interim)	2015	Vietti served as interim president from June 1 to December 31, 2015. During Vietti's term, she helped the university begin to move forward to become a more diverse university after an assistant professor from the School of Library and Information Management (SLIM) claimed a racial note was written aimed at him and his wife in April 2015. In September 2015, Vietti released a statement saying two investigations concluded that no hate crime occurred; however, as a result, the assistant professor filed a federal lawsuit against the university and its officials in October 2015. Vietti also formed a relationship between the university and Lyon County and City of Emporia governments with both governments donating a $375,000 each year for the next five years.
17		Allison Garrett	2016–2021	Garrett began her career as the 17th president of Emporia State University on January 4, 2016. Garrett previously served as the executive vice president at Abilene Christian University, and before that as the senior vice president at Oklahoma Christian University. Garrett helped Emporia State achieve increased enrollment in graduate school, set a fundraising record for the university, and helped oversee the projects of an aquatic research center, new house for the university president, a new tennis complex, and a new residence hall.
18		Ken Hush	2022	Hush was appointed as interim president at ESU in November 2021. He was named the 18th president of Emporia State University on June 22, 2022.
–		Taylor Kriley (interim)	2025–2026	Kriley, executive vice president for enrollment management and student success, served as interim president from December 2025 to March 2026.
19		Matt Baker	2026–present	Baker was announced as the 19th president in December 2025, after serving in numerous capacities at Northwest Missouri State University.

== See also ==
- List of Emporia State University people
