= H. Edward Flentje =

American educator (born 1942)

Interim President of Emporia State University
- In office July 1, 2011 – December 31, 2011
- Preceded by: Michael R. Lane
- Succeeded by: Michael D. Shonrock

Personal details
- Born: H. Edward Flentje; August 26, 1942 (age 84) Bluff City, Kansas
- Spouse: Marla
- Education: Emporia State University (B.S.); George Washington University (M.S.); University of Kansas (PhD)
- Occupation: Education

H. Edward Flentje (born August 26, 1942) is a former American educator at Wichita State University, who has served multiple positions across the state of Kansas. Most recently, Flentje served as Emporia State University's interim president in 2011 and before that, Interim City manager for Wichita, KS in 2008.

== Biography ==
=== Education ===
Flentje began his education at the Kansas State Teachers College, known today as Emporia State University, graduating in 1964. He continued at George Washington University, graduating in 1965, and finished with his doctorate from University of Kansas (KU) in 1970.

== Career ==
=== Higher education ===
After graduating from George Washington University, Flentje spent five years in Illinois. In Illinois, he served as either a visiting professor or professor at several institutions including City Colleges of Chicago from 1970 to 1971, Southern Illinois University from 1972 to 1975, and was a lecturer of political science at KU in 1976.In 1979, Flentje started full-time at Wichita State University as a visiting research and associate professor, and then later promoted to a professor in 1986 in the Hugo Wall School of Public Affairs. In the summer of 1993, Flentje was a visiting scholar at the University of California at Berkeley. In 1999, Flentje was promoted to Director of the Hugo Wall School of Public Affairs, where he served for nine years.

=== Other careers ===
Flentje served on two Kansas governors cabinet. In 1975, Flentje began his first of two careers in the Kansas State Cabinet, serving as the director of planning and research, under Gov. Robert Bennett's administration, and resigned in 1979, and in 1986, Flentje started his two-year career as the secretary of administration under Gov. Mike Hayden's administration.

=== Interim careers ===
In 2008, Flentje was named the Wichita, Kansas interim city manager, after George Kolb took the interim job at Valley Center, Kansas. Flentje served from January 2 to July 11, 2008. From July 1, 2011 until December 31, 2011, Flentje served a five-month career as Emporia State University's interim president. During Fientje's tenure at Emporia State, he helped establish $7.5 million in new scholarships for new students, freshmen, and transfer students.
