= Jackie Vietti =

American educator (born 1948)

Jacqueline Vietti
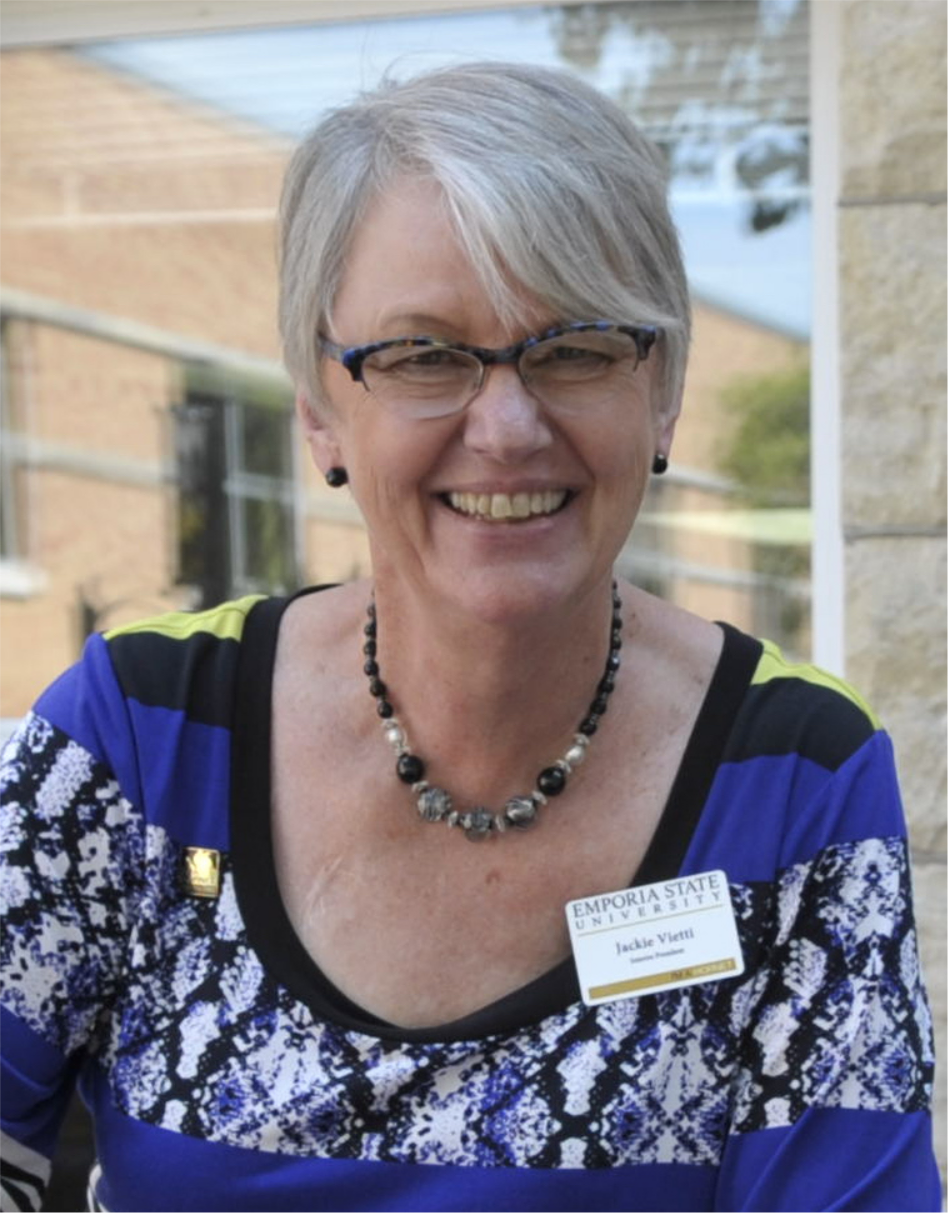
- Vietti at Emporia State in 2015

Acting President of Kansas City Kansas Community College
- Incumbent
- Assumed office August 1, 2026
- Preceded by: Greg Mosier
- In office July 19, 2017 – June 30, 2018
- Preceded by: Doris Givens
- Succeeded by: Greg Mosier

Interim President of Emporia State University
- In office June 1, 2015 – December 31, 2015
- Preceded by: Michael Shonrock
- Succeeded by: Allison Garrett

4th President of Butler Community College
- In office October 1, 1995 – December 31, 2012
- Preceded by: Rodney V. Cox
- Succeeded by: Kimberly Krull

Personal details
- Born: Jacqueline A. Basham; July 24, 1948 (age 78) Eureka, Kansas
- Spouse: Ray Vietti (m. 1970; w. 2015)
- Children: 5
- Education: Kansas State University; Emporia State University; Pittsburg State University
- Occupation: Educator

Jacqueline A. Vietti (born July 24, 1948) is an American retired educator, most notably serving as Butler Community College's president in El Dorado, Kansas, for nearly two decades. Besides serving as president of Butler, Vietti served as Dean of Instruction at Labette Community College in Kansas, Emporia State University's interim president from June to December 2015, and was Kansas City Kansas Community College's acting president from July 2017 to June 2018.

== Biography ==
=== Early life and education ===
Vietti was born on July 24, 1948, in Eureka, Kansas. After graduating high school, Vietti graduated from Kansas State University as a biology major in 1970, Emporia State University in 1971 with her secondary teaching certificate, and completed her master's of science at Pittsburg State University in 1982. In 1991, she finished her doctorate from Kansas State. Following graduation, she worked at Labette County Community College until 1995.

=== Career ===
==== Butler Community College presidency ====
In October 1995, Vietti became Butler Community College's fourth president, as well as its first woman president. During her time as president, Vietti increased enrollment between 1995 and 2010 when the college had reached a total of 10,116 students, an increase of 21%, making it one of the largest public community colleges in Kansas.

During her tenure, Vietti was responsible for the construction of a $12 million sports complex in partnership with the El Dorado Public Schools and city of El Dorado. Vietti also created a partnership that involves nearly 20 higher education institutions in the Midwest in hopes of increasing certificate/degree completion rates. Vietti retired on December 31, 2012.

==== Retirement ====
Since Vietti retired in 2012, she has served as a lecturer, a Higher Learning Commission evaluator, as well as serving on local boards.

==== Emporia State University interim presidency ====
In May 2015, the Kansas Board of Regents named Vietti as Emporia State University's interim president, a position she held from June 1 to December 31, 2015. During Vietti's term, she helped the university begin to move forward to become a more diverse university after an assistant professor from the School of Library and Information Management (SLIM) claimed a racial note was written aimed at him and his wife in April 2015. In September 2015, Vietti released a statement saying two internal investigations concluded that no hate crime occurred; and, as a result, the assistant professor filed a federal lawsuit against the university and its officials in October 2015. The federal court found Emporia State University guilty of retaliation towards the Hales under Title VII, making it the first self-represented litigant to defeat a public university.

Vietti also formed a relationship between the university and Lyon County and City of Emporia governments with both governments donating a $375,000 each year for the next five years.

==== Kansas City Kansas Community College ====
On July 19, 2017, the board of trustees for Kansas City Kansas Community College announced they had hired Vietti as the acting president while their current president was originally on administrative leave before being fired. Vietti's tenure at KCKCC will end on June 30, 2018, when the incoming president takes office. Vietti's last day was June 30, 2018.

She was named interim president again, effective August 1, 2026.

== Personal life ==
Vietti and her late-husband Ray have five children:Dana Vietti MD, Angela Vietti O'Kane, Mike Vietti, James Vietti Esq., and Christopher Vietti.
