= Schwenn =

Schwenn is a surname. Notable people with the name include:

- Helmuth Schwenn (1913–1983), German water polo
- John O. Schwenn (born 1949), American education administrator

== See also ==
- Dixon-Globe Opera House-Robinson-Schwenn Building, a registered historic building in Hamilton, Ohio
