= John E. Jacobs =

American educator

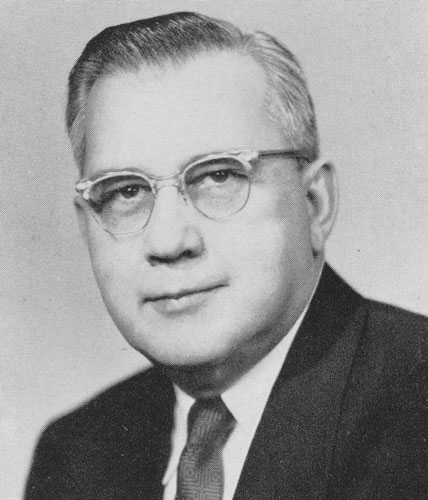

Interim President of the Kansas State Teachers College
- In office January 16, 1953 – July 31, 1953
- Preceded by: David L. MacFarlane
- Succeeded by: John E. King

Personal details
- Born: John Earl Jacobs; November 29, 1903 Independence, Kansas
- Died: May 24, 1971 (aged 67) Hollywood, California
- Resting place: Emporia, Kansas
- Spouse: Doris Marguerite Latta
- Education: Pittsburg State University (B.S.); University of Kansas (M.S.; PhD)
- Occupation: Educator

John Earl Jacobs (November 29, 1903 – May 24, 1971) was an American educator most notably for serving as an administrator at what is now known as Emporia State University. Before serving as the Kansas State Teachers College (KSTC) interim president of, Jacobs was the Supervisor of Secondary Education at KSTC and served as principal of a couple of high schools before coming to Emporia.

== Biography ==
=== Early life and education ===
Jacobs was born on November 29, 1903, in Independence, Kansas. After graduating high school, Jacobs attended KSTC in Pittsburg, now known as Pittsburg State University, Jacobs completed his bachelor of science in 1925, and both his master's and doctorate from the University of Kansas (KU). After graduating with his master's degree, Jacobs was a guest lecturer at the KU, and was later the principal of the university's high school. A few years later after educating in the Burlingame Public Schools, Jacobs became principal of Osawatomie High School. He was principal of Lawrence Junior High School from 1934 to 1941.

=== Kansas State Teachers College ===
Jacobs started in 1947 at the KSTC as the Supervisor of Secondary Education and on January 16, 1953, Jacobs became the interim president of KSTC after David L. MacFarlane, the incumbent president, died of heart problems. Jacobs's last day at KSTC was July 31, 1953.

=== State office ===
After serving as the interim president of KSTC, Jacobs served as the Director of Special Education, a newly created division at the time, for the Kansas Department of Public Instruction for four years before moving to California. He served that position until his retirement in 1971.
