= John O. Schwenn =

American education administrator

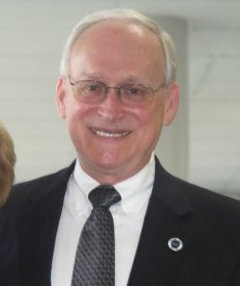

4th President of Dalton State College
- In office March 1, 2008 – December 31, 2014
- Preceded by: James A. Burran
- Succeeded by: Margaret H. Venable

Interim President of Emporia State University
- In office July 1, 2006 – October 31, 2006
- Preceded by: Kay Schallenkamp
- Succeeded by: Michael R. Lane

Vice President for Academic Affairs at Emporia State University
- In office 1997 – February 29, 2008

Personal details
- Born: August 19, 1949 (age 77) La Crosse, Wisconsin
- Spouse: Judy Schwenn
- Education: University of Wisconsin–La Crosse (B.S.); University of Wisconsin–Madison (M.S.; PhD)
- Occupation: Education

John O. Schwenn (born August 19, 1949) is an American former education administrator who was Dalton State College's fourth president from 2009 until his retirement in 2014. He had previously held various positions at Emporia State University and Delta State University

== Biography ==
=== Education ===
In 1971, Schwenn graduated as a psychology major from University of Wisconsin–La Crosse. From 1973 to 1976, Schwann attended the University of Wisconsin–Madison, graduating from the graduate school and with a doctoral degree.

=== Early career and Emporia State University ===
In 1976, Schwann began his nearly forty-year career in higher education as the Delta State University Director of Special Education. Thirteen years later in 1989, Schwenn moved to Emporia, Kansas to become Emporia State University's (ESU) associate chair of the Psychology department. Schwenn held various positions including the Chair of Psychology Department, and the academic affairs associate vice president. In 1997 when the university received a new president, Schwenn began his ten-year career as the academic affairs vice president and provost. In July 2006, Schwenn began his career as the Emporia State interim president, serving until October 31, 2006.

=== Dalton State College president ===
In November 2007, Schwann was selected as Dalton State College's fourth president of, beginning in March 2008. While Schwenn was president of Dalton State, undergraduate programs were increased from six to 17, increased graduation rates, expanded the college with a satellite campus in Gilmer County, Georgia and established the first residence hall on Dalton State's campus in 2010. Schwenn retired in December 2014.
