= Joseph H. Hill =

American educator

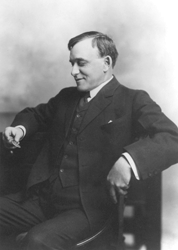

7th President of the Kansas State Normal
- In office July 1, 1906 – June 30, 1913
- Preceded by: Jasper N. Wilkinson
- Succeeded by: Thomas W. Butcher

Personal details
- Born: Joseph Henry Hill; May 21, 1858 Stockton, Pennsylvania
- Died: February 13, 1927 (aged 68) Independence, Missouri
- Resting place: Independence, Missouri
- Spouse: Frances Meldrus (m. 1892–1927)
- Education: Kansas State Normal; Northwestern University; Baker University
- Occupation: Educator

Joseph Henry Hill (May 21, 1858 – February 13, 1927) was an American educator, most notable for serving as the Kansas State Normal School's seventh president in Emporia, Kansas.

== Biography ==
=== Early life and education ===
Hill, born May 21, 1858, in Pennsylvania, and his family moved to Kansas shortly after he was born. In 1876, Hill graduated from Kansas State Normal School (KSN). In 1886, he graduated from Northwestern University, as well as in 1889. After attending Northwestern University, Hill moved back to Kansas in 1887 to teach at KSN, holding various positions including vice president of KSN until 1906. Hill graduated with his doctorate from Baker University in 1906.

=== Kansas State Normal presidency ===
Hill, the first president to graduate from the Kansas State Normal, became the next president of the Normal school in 1906 after Jasper N. Wilkinson resigned. During Hill's administration, several new buildings were built on the campus. The Kansas State Legislature granted more funding for the school to establish the music department in 1909. Several years later on June 30, 1913, Hill resigned to become a Boston University professor.
