= James F. Price =

American academic

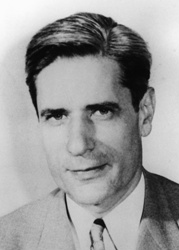

10th Chancellor of the University of Denver
- In office April 1948 – October 1948
- Preceded by: Caleb Frank Gates
- Succeeded by: Albert Charles Jacobs

President of Kansas State Teachers College
- In office July 1, 1943 – June 30, 1945
- Preceded by: Thomas W. Butcher
- Succeeded by: David L. MacFarlane

Personal details
- Born: May 28, 1906 Manhattan, Kansas, U.S.
- Died: March 29, 1994 (aged 87) San Diego County, California, U.S.
- Education: Kansas State College; Stanford University
- Occupation: lawyer, businessman, broker

James Francis Price (May 28, 1906 – March 29, 1994) was an American academic. He succeeded Caleb Gates as the ninth chancellor of the University of Denver. He had served as acting chancellor for eight months, assuming the official chancellorship in 1947. He resigned six months later for health reasons. Price was born in Manhattan, Kansas in 1906. He graduated from Kansas State College in 1927 and then from Stanford University with a law degree in 1930 and a masters in law in 1937. He worked in the business sector and in private law practice for six years before entering the education field. He spent three years as a legal adviser and vice president of the Raven Trust Company in Shanghai, China. Upon his return to the United States he became a partner in the Chicago brokerage firm Hedge and Price. In December 1940 he was invited to become Dean of the law school at Washburn Municipal College at Topeka, Kansas where he served from 1941 to 1943. He then became the president of Kansas State Teachers College. Price joined the University of Denver staff on July 1, 1945 as the dean of the law school. He also served dean of the College of Business Administration and director of Public Administration at the university. He became acting chancellor on September 1, 1947 upon the retirement of Caleb Gates. During his chancellorship enrollment increased to almost 11,000 students. He was succeeded by Dr. Alfred C. Nelson. He died in San Diego County, California in 1994.
