= Lillian Hoxie Picken =

American educator (1852–1913)

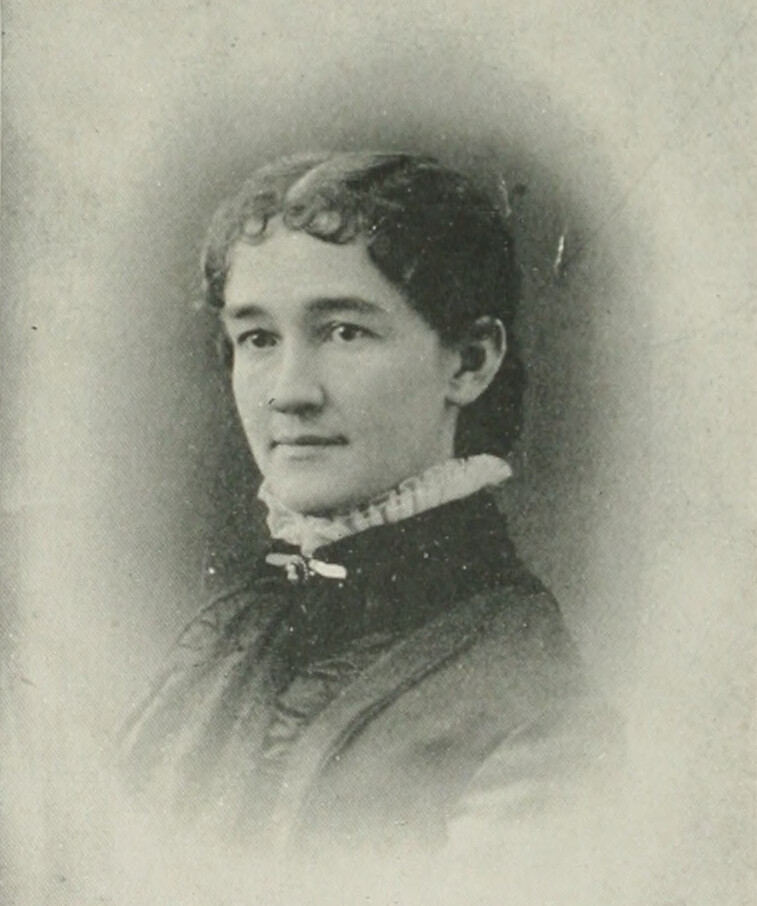
- Portrait photo from A Woman of the Century
- Born: Lillian Hoxie; December 23, 1852; Clarksville, Mercer County, Pennsylvania, U.S.
- Died: November 18, 1913; Hays, Kansas, U.S.
- Occupations: educator; textbook editor
- Employer: Emporia State Normal School
- Notable work: The Crane Reader series

Signature
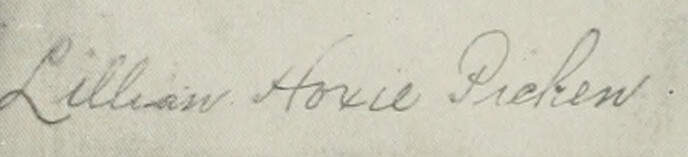

Lillian Hoxie Picken (1852–1913) was an American educator and textbook editor. She taught in every grade of public schools, including at Parsons, Kansas and Fort Scott, Kansas, in the Emporia State Normal School (now Emporia State University Teachers College), and in two colleges, besides conducting more than 20 institutes in Kansas. In 1902 and 1903, Picken compiled five illustrated textbooks into a children's reading series for the State of Kansas.

== Early life and education ==
Lillian Hoxie was born in Lancaster County, Pennsylvania, December 23, 1852. (Note: According to Lillian's obituary in The Topeka State Journal (1913), she was born in Lancaster County, Pennsylvania, December 23, 1852. In A Woman of the Century (1893), Willard & Livermore record that Lillian was born in Clarksville, Mercer County, Pennsylvania, December 24, 1856. The census data in FamilySearch supports the former, not the latter year.) She was the fourth child of the six children of James L. and Charity S. Hoxie.

Her family moved to Michigan, and in that State, she received a normal and university education.

== Career ==
After graduation, Picken taught for 20 years, 18 of which were with the educational interests of Kansas. Her work covered all the grades of schools, including six years in the Emporia State Normal School. She was an instructor in 23 normal institutes, and she conducted the majority of them.

In 1902 and 1903, Picken compiled five illustrated textbooks as a children's reading series, illustrated by three different artists, also containing biographies of noted authors, written by Margaret Hill McCarter. Picken also contributed to educational and literary periodicals for many years.

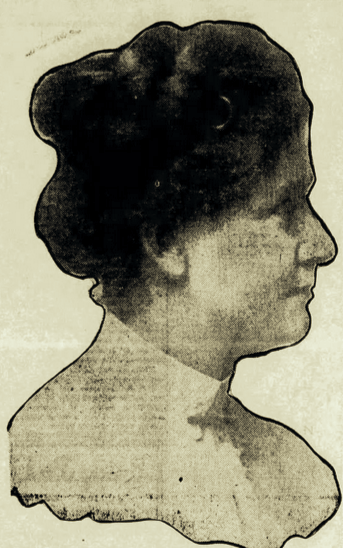
(1913)

In September 1913, Picken became Secretary of the 3,800 member YWCA of Kansas City, Missouri.

== Personal life ==
On June 19, 1886, at Emporia, Kansas, she married William Samuel Picken (1862–1926), and they lived in Iola, Kansas. Their children were Chat and Lucie Lillian.

Lillian Hoxie Picken died in Hays, Kansas, November 18, 1913.

== Selected works ==
- The Crane First Reader, 1902 (text)
- The Crane Second Reader, 1903 (text)
- The Crane Third Reader, 1903 (text)
- The Crane Fourth Reader, 1902 (text)
- The Crane Fifth Reader, 1902 (text)
