= George W. Hoss =

American educator

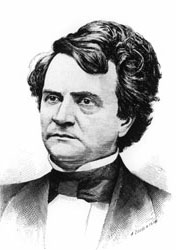

2nd President of the Kansas State Normal
- In office July 1, 1871 – December 31, 1873
- Preceded by: Lyman Beecher Kellogg
- Succeeded by: Charles Rhodes Pomeroy

8th Indiana Superintendent of Public Instruction
- In office 1864–1868
- Preceded by: Samuel L. Rugg
- Succeeded by: Barnabas C. Hobbs

Personal details
- Born: George Washington Hoss; November 6, 1824 Brown County, Ohio
- Died: April 22, 1906 (aged 81) Wichita, Kansas
- Party: Democratic
- Spouse(s): Harriet J. Mitchell (m. 1850; died 1886) May Engstrom (m. 1888–1906)
- Education: Indiana Asbury University
- Occupation: Educator

George Washington Hoss (November 6, 1824 – April 11, 1906) was an American educator serving many positions at several institutions. Hoss was most notable for being an Indiana Superintendent of Public Instruction and the Kansas State Normal School's (KSN) second president.

== Biography ==
=== Early life and education ===
Hoss' parents, Jacob and Jane Kinney Hoss, moved his family to Indiana in 1836, twelve years after Hoss was born in 1824. Hoss attended Indiana Asbury University, where he graduated in 1850 and 1853.

=== Principal, professor, state educator ===
After graduating college, Hoss became the principal at Muncie Academy, located in Muncie, Indiana, from 1850 to 1852. After leaving Muncie Academy, he then went to serve as a professor of mathematics at the Indiana Females College in Indianapolis, Indiana from 1852 to 1856 before leaving to become a professor at Butler University from 1856 to 1864. In 1864, Hoss became the eighth superintendent of the Indiana Department of Education. He resigned in 1968.

=== Kansas State Normal president ===
On July 1, 1871, Hoss replaced Lyman Beecher Kellogg, to become the Kansas State Normal School's second president. While president, Hoss was able to secure funds needed from the Kansas Legislature to build another building, and the school's enrollment increased to 200. In 1872, Hoss hosted state representatives at KSN, which concluded with the House securing $50,000 for the school with city of Emporia providing $10,000, the day after their visit.

In April 1873, Hoss reported issues with the professors to the Kansas Board of Regents and advised that everyone employed should submit their resignations and for the Board to decide who was to be rehired; the Board decided in May 1873, to rehire Hoss, along with only one other faculty member. In August 1873, Hoss announced his resignation as president to become a professor at Indiana University. He continued until December 31 of that year.

=== After the normal school presidency ===
After Hoss resigned from the Normal School in 1873, him and his family returned to Indiana where he became a professor at Indiana University. Seven years later in 1880, Hoss returned to Topeka, Kansas, purchasing The Educationist. In 1884, Hoss became a professor and chair of the English Department at Baker University.

In 1880 after being in Baldwin for six years, Hoss and his second wife, May Engstrom, moved to Wichita, Kansas and founded the Western School of Elocution and Oratory. The Hoss family remained there until his death in 1906.

== Personal life ==
After graduating from Indiana Asbury, Hoss was married to his first wife, Harriet Mitchell, in 1850 and had a son together named Melville Mitchell in 1853. Hoss and Harriet were married until 1886 when she died due to an illness. In 1888, Hoss and May Engstrom united in marriage, in which they had one son named Wendell born in 1892.

On April 11, 1906, Hoss died in Wichita.
