= Thomas W. Butcher =

American educator

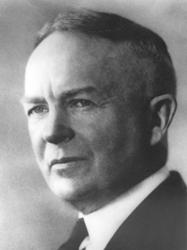

8th President of the Kansas State Teachers College
- In office July 1, 1913 – June 30, 1943
- Preceded by: Joseph H. Hill
- Succeeded by: James F. Price

6th President of Central State Normal School
- In office 1906–1908
- Preceded by: Frederick Howard Umholtz
- Succeeded by: James Argyle McLauchlin

Personal details
- Born: Thomas Walter Butcher; July 3, 1867 Macomb, Illinois
- Died: July 14, 1947 (aged 80) Emporia, Kansas
- Resting place: Emporia, Kansas
- Spouse: Mary W. Peck (m. 1900–1947)
- Education: University of Kansas (B.A.); Harvard University (M.A.)
- Occupation: Education administrator

Thomas Walter Butcher (July 3, 1867 – July 14, 1947) was an American educator most notably for serving as president at what is now known as Emporia State University. Before serving as the Kansas State Normal School's president, Butcher served various state-level education administrator jobs.

== Biography ==
=== Early life and education ===
Butcher was born to Boman Rilea Butcher and Adeline Vail in Macomb, Illinois. Butcher attended The University of Kansas (KU), where he later graduated in 1894. Butcher began his career in education as a principal of a couple of high schools in Oklahoma, and in 1904, Butcher received his master of arts from Harvard University. Two years after graduating from Harvard, Butcher became Central State Normal School's sixth president in Edmond, Oklahoma, and served until 1908. After resigning from Central State in 1908, Butcher left for Frederick William University in Germany. In 1909 after a year in Germany, Butcher served as a superintendent in Enid, Oklahoma, from 1909 to 1913, and was later named Kansas State Normal's president in 1913.

=== KSN–Kansas State Teachers College presidency ===
In 1914, Butcher started a work study program, which would give students on-campus jobs to help them attend school. 1917 saw the completion of the administrative building, Plumb Hall. Albert Taylor Hall, named after the fifth president of KSN, Albert R. Taylor, is an auditorium located within the building. Under Butcher's administration, the Memorial Union was built in 1922, named to honor veterans of World War I. Butcher also helped the Normal School transition a name change; the new name would Kansas State Teachers College to focus on teaching. In 1938, a new stadium, later named Francis G. Welch Stadium, opened, as well as a bell tower known today as Silent Joe. Butcher retired on June 30, 1943, as the longest serving president in the history of Emporia State University.

== Personal life ==
Butcher united in marriage with Mary W. Peck on July 3, 1900, in Wellington, Kansas, and had three children. On July 14, 1947, Butcher died in Emporia. Butcher Education Center, which houses the Sociology, Anthropology, and Crime and Delinquencies department, is named after him.
