= Kay Schallenkamp =

American education administrator

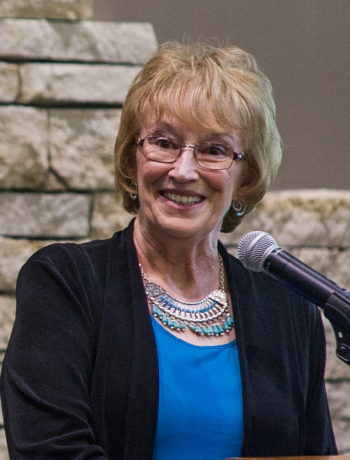
- Schallenkamp in 2017

9th President of Black Hills State University
- In office July 1, 2006 – June 30, 2014
- Preceded by: Thomas Flickema
- Succeeded by: Tom Jackson Jr.

14th President of Emporia State University
- In office August 1, 1997 – June 30, 2006
- Preceded by: Robert E. Glennen
- Succeeded by: Michael R. Lane

Personal details
- Born: December 9, 1949 (age 76) Salem, South Dakota
- Spouse: Ken Schallenkamp
- Education: Northern State University (B.S.); University of South Dakota (M.S.); University of Colorado Boulder (PhD)
- Occupation: Education

Kay Schallenkamp (born December 9, 1949) is an American education administrator, most recently serving as Black Hills State University's ninth president in Spearfish, South Dakota. Before her job at Black Hills State, Schallenkamp also served as the fourteenth president at Emporia State University, provost and vice-chancellor at the University of Wisconsin–Whitewater, Chadron State College, and multiple positions at Northern State University.

== Biography ==
=== Education ===
Schallenkamp received her bachelor's degree at Northern State University, her master's at the University of South Dakota, and her doctorate from the University of Colorado Boulder in 1982.

=== Early career ===
Schallenkamp started in higher education in 1973 at Northern State University as a professor. She was then the chair of the department from 1982 to 1984, following as the graduate studies and research dean in 1984. Schallenkamp was selected as Chadron State College provost in 1988, and four years later in 1992, she became the University of Wisconsin–Whitewater's provost.

=== Emporia State University ===
The "Power E" in which Schallenkamp helped set as the university's first permanent logo

On August 1, 1997, Schallenkamp began as Emporia State University's 14th president, making her the first woman to head a Kansas Board of Regents school. During Schallenkamp's tenure at Emporia State, she reversed the decline enrollment from the past several years. Schallenkamp became most notable at Emporia State for creating a new graphic identity for Emporia State, including the "Power E", which is the current athletics logo for Emporia State University. Schallenkamp also increased the ESU Foundation's endowment. In 2006, she left to become Black Hills State University's president.

On February 16, 2018, Founders Day at Emporia State, 17th president Allison Garrett announced that the new residence hall – which will open in August 2019 – will be named after Schallenkamp.

=== Black Hills State University ===
On July 1, 2006, Schallenkamp began her second presidency as Black Hills State University's (BHSU) ninth president, and the university's first woman president. During Schallenkamp tenure at BHSU, the university increased enrollment rates, as well as graduation rates, established new academic programs, and increased funding. Schallenkamp also built and strengthened partnerships with the communities. Schallenkamp received an honorary doctorate, Doctor of Public Service, in June 2014 for her work at BHSU. Schallenkamp retired on June 30, 2014.

== Personal life ==
Schallenkamp is married to Ken Schallenkamp and they have two daughters, both of whom followed their mother into education. The Schallenkamps have four grandchildren.
