= Rudolph B. Welch =

American lawyer (1850–1906)

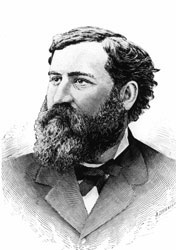

4th President of the Kansas State Normal
- In office August 20, 1879 – June 30, 1882
- Preceded by: Charles Rhodes Pomeroy
- Succeeded by: Albert R. Taylor

Personal details
- Born: Rudolph Bair Welch; July 23, 1850 Spencerville, Indiana
- Died: October 12, 1906 (aged 56) Topeka, Kansas
- Resting place: Topeka, Kansas
- Spouse: Margaret Hammond (m. 1870–1906)
- Education: Illinois Wesleyan University
- Occupation: Educator, attorney

Rudolph Blair Welch (July 23, 1850 – October 12, 1906) was an American educator and attorney most notable for serving as the fourth president of the Kansas State Normal School (KSN), now known as Emporia State University, in Emporia, Kansas.

== Biography ==
=== Early life and career ===
Rudolph Blair Welch was born on July 23, 1850, in Spencerville, Indiana. Welch graduated from Illinois Wesleyan University in 1877 with an education degree. After graduating, Welch immediately became the superintendent of schools in Pontiac, Illinois, serving for 12 years.

=== Kansas State Normal presidency ===
On August 20, 1879, just fourteen days after Charles Rhodes Pomeroy's resignation, Welch became the fourth president of the Kansas State Normal School. In 1878, a year before he became president, a fire and tornado struck the administration building on campus. Shortly after taking over as president, the school built two temporary buildings due to the tornado and fire the previous year.

Welch traveled the state of Kansas to promote the school and under Welch's guidance, enrollment grew. On March 6, 1882, Welch resigned to practice law, which would be effective June 30, 1882.

=== Political career ===
From 1889 to 1893, he served as Shawnee County Attorney, succeeding Charles Curtis, who would later become Vice President of the United States. He also served as president of the Topeka Board of Education.
