= Jasper N. Wilkinson =

American educator and businessman in Kansas

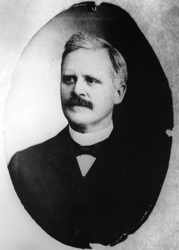

6th President of the Kansas State Normal
- In office June 7, 1901 – June 30, 1906
- Preceded by: Albert R. Taylor
- Succeeded by: Joseph H. Hill

Personal details
- Born: Jasper Newton Wilkinson; September 19, 1851 Vinton County, Ohio
- Died: January 11, 1933 (aged 81) Muskogee, Oklahoma
- Resting place: Muskogee, Oklahoma
- Spouse: Nellie Reynolds (m. 1879–1933)
- Education: Illinois Normal School
- Occupation: Educator, businessman

Jasper Newton Wilkinson (September 19, 1851 – January 11, 1933) was an American educator and businessman, most notable for serving as the Kansas State Normal School's (KSN) sixth president in Emporia, Kansas.

== Biography ==
=== Early life and education ===
Wilkinson, born September 19, 1851, to Jackson and Mary, began his career in education at sixteen. In 1874, Wilkinson graduated from Illinois Normal School. After graduating from college, Wilkinson was the principal of the Buda, Illinois school district until 1879. Wilkinson moved to Emporia, Kansas in 1884 to become a professor at the Normal school and later became vice-president.

=== Kansas State Normal presidency ===
Wilkinson took over as the Kansas State Normal School's sixth president on June 7, 1901, following Albert R. Taylor's resignation. Shortly after becoming president, Wilkinson decided that students who were failing would not continue at the Normal school and only those who completed a four-year program would graduate. In 1901, the school's first men's basketball event was played in Emporia. In 1903, a library opened, along with new bleachers for the football fields in 1905.

=== Later life ===
After resigning in June 1906 from the Normal School, Wilkinson bought and became the president of the Citizens Bank in Oklahoma until 1910. In January 1911, Wilkinson died.
