= Brent Sommerhauser =

American sculptor, glassblower and artist

- Born: United States
- Education: Butler Community College; Emporia State University; Ohio State University
- Known for: Sculpture glass art visual art
- Website: http://brentsommerhauser.com/

Brent Sommerhauser is an American sculptor, glassblower, and artist based in Las Vegas, Nevada. He is known for his large-scale sculptures and his glass art, as well as for sculptural drawings.

He has been an instructor at the College for Creative Studies, Hastings College, the Kansas City Art Institute, Pilchuck Glass School, and Ohio State University, and is an assistant professor at the University of Nevada, Las Vegas.

== Education ==
Sommerhauser attended Butler Community College, Emporia State University, and Ohio State University. He received a bachelor's degree in psychology and a Master of Fine Arts.

While studying for his master's degree, Sommerhauser began to analyze interiors of architectural spaces and study how they are used to describe psychic or mental space, drawing upon Emily Dickinson's poetry and Carl Jung's theories. He began entering homes that had been designated for demolition and cutting holes in floors and walls to explore what he saw as a merging of psychology, poetry and stories.

== Work ==
Sommerhauser is described as an organic artist. His installations include large-scale sculptures that mimic towers and sinkholes, the latter being inspired by Sommerhauser seeing a photograph of a dam's spillway. He also makes use of found materials, such as a discarded door, and flooring materials which have been re-engineered to create organic visual effects.

His displays are often designed to interact with the architecture of the gallery displaying them.
