= Charles Rhodes Pomeroy =

American educator

Charles R. Pomeroy
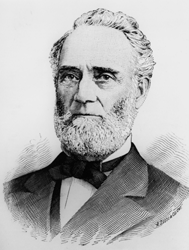

3rd President of the Kansas State Normal
- In office January 1, 1874 – August 6, 1879
- Preceded by: George W. Hoss
- Succeeded by: Rudolph B. Welch

Personal details
- Born: Charles Rhodes Pomeroy; June 15, 1830 Weybridge, Vermont
- Died: June 25, 1916 (aged 86) Vashon, Washington
- Resting place: Vashon, Washington
- Spouse: Mary J. Meeker (m. 1854; died 1913)
- Education: Wesleyan University (B.A.; M.A.); Simpson Centenary College (D.D.)
- Occupation: Educator

Charles Rhodes Pomeroy (June 15, 1830 – June 25, 1916) was an American educator most notable for serving as the Kansas State Normal School's (KSN) third president in Emporia, Kansas.

== Biography ==
=== Early life and education ===
Pomeroy was born in Weybridge, Addison County, Vermont on June 15, 1830. In 1856 Pomeroy graduated from Wesleyan University with a bachelor's and master's of arts, and 1875, he graduated from Simpson Centenary College in Indianola, Iowa with a doctorate.

=== Early career ===
In 1854, Pomeroy started his long career in education by teaching Greek at Fort Edward Institute in Fort Edward, New York. From 1855 to 1860, Pomeroy served as a principal at four different institutions: Union Village Academy for one year, Rochester High School for two years, and Genesee Wesleyan Seminary for one year.

=== Kansas State Normal School presidency ===
The Kansas Board of Regents selected Pomeroy as the Kansas State Normal School's third president in October 1873. He would begin his tenure on January 1, 1874. Because the economy was poor, Pomeroy was unable to pay the professors and staff and also had to work without salary; the board voted that bonds would be paid to teachers as a way of thanking them for their service during the school year on July 2, 1879.

During Pomeroy's tenure, a tornado had hit in April 1878 and destroyed the main building on campus, which was followed by a fire that destroyed the two buildings at the school. On August 6, 1879, Pomeroy resigned as president.

=== Later career ===
After serving four years as president of the Normal School in Emporia, Pomeroy became Callahan College's president for six years. From 1886 to 1899, Pomeroy served as the Dean and a professor at the University of Puget Sound in Washington (state).

== Personal life ==
On December 2, 1854, Pomeroy married Mary J. Meeker and had one child, Charles Harrington Pomeroy on March 28, 1863.
