= Emporia State University Teachers College =

Public college in Emporia, Kansas, US

Emporia State University The Teachers College
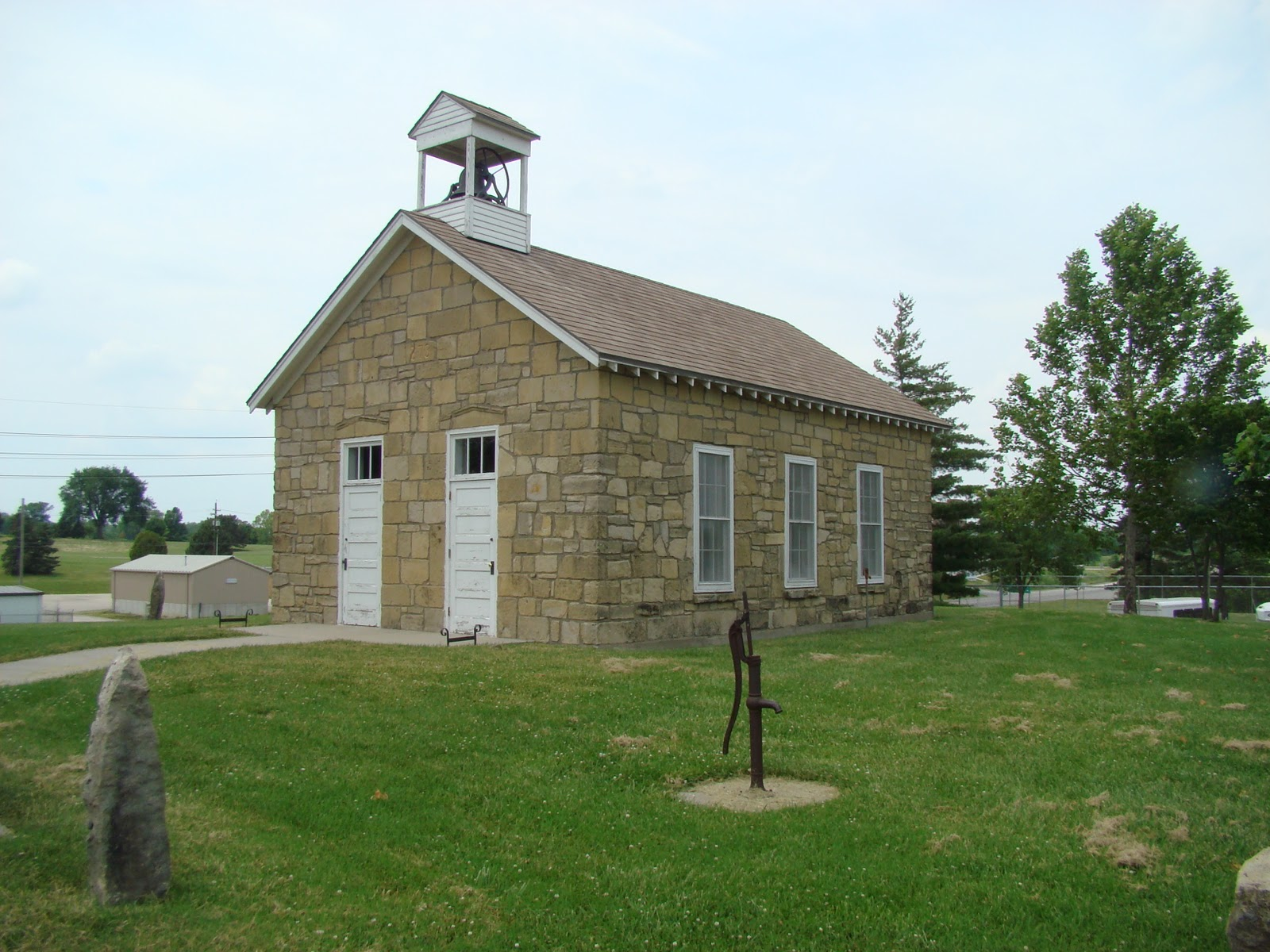
- One-room schoolhouse on the ESU Campus
- Motto: Continuing the Legacy of Excellence in Teacher Education
- Type: School of education
- Established: February 15, 1863
- Parent institution: Emporia State University
- Dean: Sara Schwerdtfeger
- Location: Emporia, Kansas, U.S. 38.4179°N 96.1813°W
- Website: www.emporia.edu/teachers-college/

The Teachers College at Emporia State University is an education college located in Emporia, Kansas, United States. It is a part of Emporia State University.

== History ==
The university was established in 1863 as Kansas State Normal School. University history gives 1907 as the first date that teacher training was organized as a department.

Since then, The Teachers College has been through a few name changes:

- 1907–1929: Department of Pedagogy;
- 1929–1969: Department of Education;
- 1969–1983: School of Education and Psychology;
- 1983–1988: College of Education;
- 1988–present: The Teachers College

== Departments and services ==
- Counselor Education (art therapy, mental health counseling, rehabilitation counseling, rehabilitation services education, school counseling)
- Elementary Education/Early Childhood/Special Education
- Health, Physical Education, and Recreation (athletic training, health education, health promotion, physical education, recreation, coaching education)
- Instructional Design & Technology
- Jones Institute for Educational Excellence
- Literacy Center
- Office of Field Placement & Licensure
- Psychology (experimental psychology concentration, industrial organizational psychology concentration, clinical psychology, school psychology)
- School Leadership / Middle & Secondary Teacher Education

== National Teachers Hall of Fame ==
The National Teachers Hall of Fame (NTHF) is a non-profit organization that honors exceptional school teachers. The NTHF was established in 1989 by a consortium of organizations including Emporia State, the Alumni Association of the school, the City of Emporia, Emporia Public Schools, as well as the Emporia Area Chamber of Commerce. The NTHF has a museum on Emporia State's campus that honors the teachers inducted. Every June, the Hall of Fame inducts five of the most outstanding educators in the United States.

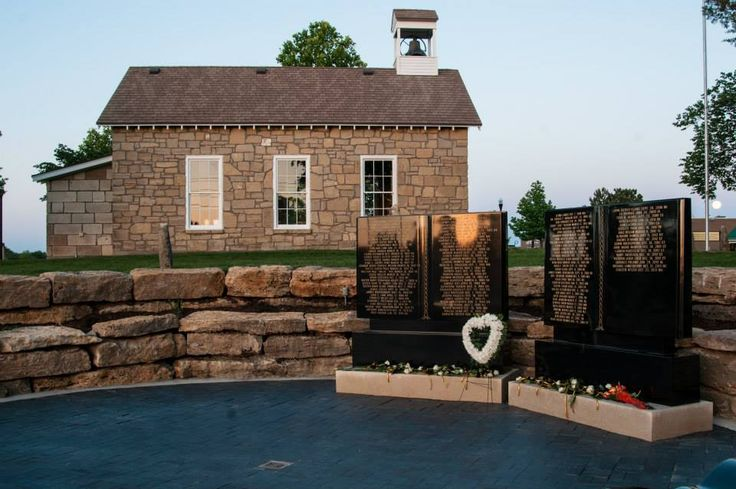
Memorial for Fallen Educators with the one-room school house in the background

=== Memorial for Fallen Educators ===
On June 13, 2013, the NTHF executive director Carol Strickland, along with former ESU President Michael Shonrock, Bill Maness, representing U.S. Sen. Jerry Moran, and former mayor Rob Gilligan, broke ground by the one-room school house located on the Emporia State campus to build a memorial for the teachers that have fallen in the "line of duty". The Sandy Hook Elementary School shooting was the main inspiration for the memorial. On June 6, 2014, the granite memorial markers were placed along with granite benches. The official dedication was on June 12, 2014.

On September 21, 2015, United States Senator Jerry Moran introduced a bill to the United States Congress to designate the memorial as the "National Memorial to Fallen Educators". Since the bill was passed by both the United States House of Representatives and Senate, the memorial was signed by the President of the United States, and the memorial did not become a part of the National Park Service nor are federal funds used.

== Accolades and rankings ==
The Teachers College at Emporia State University is one of only four post-secondary institutions in the nation—along with Alverno College, Stanford University, and University of Virginia—to be identified as an Exemplary Model Teacher Education program by Arthur Levine in his 2006 national study of teacher education programs Educating School Teachers.

== Notable people ==
- Lillian Hoxie Picken (1852-1913), educator and textbook author

== See also ==
- Kansas State Department of Education
- United States Department of Education
