= Lyman Beecher Kellogg =

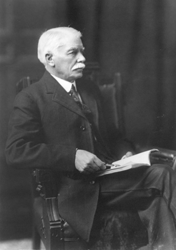

14th Kansas Attorney General
- In office January 14, 1889 – January 12, 1891
- Governor: Lyman U. Humphrey
- Preceded by: Simeon Briggs Bradford
- Succeeded by: John Nutt Ives

1st President of the Kansas State Normal
- In office February 15, 1865 – June 30, 1871
- Preceded by: Position established
- Succeeded by: George W. Hoss

Personal details
- Born: Lyman Beecher Kellogg; September 28, 1841 Lorain County, Ohio
- Died: October 8, 1918 (aged 77) Emporia, Kansas
- Party: Republican
- Spouse(s): Abigail Homer (m. 1867; died 1873) Jennie Mitchell (m. 1878; died 1911)
- Children: Vernon Lyman Kellogg
- Education: Illinois Normal University
- Occupation: Politician

Lyman Beecher Kellogg (September 28, 1841 – October 8, 1918) was the first president, as well as the first teacher, of Kansas State Normal (KSN), now known as Emporia State University, in Emporia, Kansas, United States. After serving as KSN's president, Kellogg went on to become an attorney, state representative and senator, and the Kansas Attorney General.

== Biography ==
=== Early life ===
Kellogg was born to Hiram Kellogg and Delia Rose Beecher. Soon after his birth, his family moved to Bloomington, Illinois, where he attended the State Normal University, graduating in June 1865. In January 1865, Kellogg was appointed as Kansas State Normal's first president.

=== Kansas State Normal presidency ===
After being named president of the newly established normal school in Kansas, Kellogg's first class, which consisted of only 18 students, opened with the "Lord's Prayer" on February 15, 1865. Because funding, facilities, and teaching materials were limited, Kellogg was the sole teacher, besides being the president. In August 1865, he added Henry Brace Norton, who graduated from Illinois Normal University, as a faculty member.

=== Political career ===
In June 1871, Kellogg left the Normal School and moved to Arkansas City, Kansas. While there, Kellogg turned to practicing law and later returned to Emporia in April 1875 to continue practicing law. After returning to Emporia, he served as a State Representative 1877 to 1879. After the state legislature, he was a Lyon County probate judge from 1879 to 1885, and returned to the legislature as a state senator from 1885 to 1889. After being a state senator for four years, Kellogg won election for Attorney General as a Republican, serving from January 14, 1889 to January 12, 1891.

== Personal life ==
While at Kansas State Normal, Kellogg married Abigail "Abbie" Homer, with whom he had two children, Vernon Lyman and Fred Homer. After moving to Arkansas City in 1871, Abbie became ill and died of tuberculosis in 1873. Five years later, Kellogg married Mary Virginia Mitchell, mostly known as Jennie Mitchell Kellogg, with whom he had three children, Charles Mitchell (1879), Mary Virginia (1883), and Joseph Mitchell (1885). Jennie was Deputy Kansas Attorney General under Kellogg.

Legal offices
Preceded by Simeon Briggs Bradford	Attorney General of Kansas; 1889–1891	Succeeded by John Nutt Ives
