= Butler Community College =

Public college in El Dorado, Kansas, U.S.

- Type: Public community college
- Established: 1927
- President: Tamara Daniel
- Academic staff: 1,200
- Students: 6,574 (fall 2023)
- Location: El Dorado, Kansas, United States; 37°48′24″N 96°52′59″W
- Campus: Rural
- Colors: Purple and Gold
- Nickname: Grizzlies
- Sporting affiliations: NAIA – KJCCC
- Website: butlercc.edu

Butler Community College (BCC) is a public community college in El Dorado, Kansas, United States.

== History ==
In 1927, El Dorado Junior College was founded. The college name has evolved over the years: Butler County Junior College, Butler County Community Junior College, Butler County Community College (BCCC), then finally to its current name of Butler Community College.

=== Leaders ===
During the first 40 years of the college, Butler's leaders were known as the dean. That changed in 1963, as Edwin Walbourn was named President when the school became a community college.

Presidents

- Tamara Daniel, 2025–present
- Jackie Vietti, 2025 (interim)
- Kimberly Krull, 2013–2025
- Karla Fisher, 2012–2013 (interim)
- Jackie Vietti, 1995–2012
- Rodney V. Cox Jr., 1988–1995
- Walter Browe, 1987–1988 (interim)
- Carl Heinrich, 1976–1987
- Edwin J. Walbourn, 1963–1976

Deans

- Edwin J. Walbourn, 1960–1963
- Tilghman Aley, 1955–1960
- Max Beckford, 1947–1955
- Hubert A. Shumway, 1946–1947
- Earl Walker, 1927–1946

== Campus ==
The main campus is locate on the western side of El Dorado along Haverhill Road. There are branch campuses throughout Kansas, in Andover, Council Grove, Marion, McConnell, Rose Hill, and distance-learning sites in high schools.

== Academics ==
Butler is the second largest community college in Kansas, with 13,000 students annually across six campus locations. Most are commuters. The school is accredited by the Higher Learning Commission, the Accreditation Council of Business Schools and Programs, the National League of Nursing, and the Kansas State Board of Nursing.

== Athletics ==
The school mascot is the grizzly bear, colors are purple (PMS 2627) and gold (PMS 465 or 871), cross country, football, basketball (men and women), track, women's soccer, volleyball, baseball, and softball, as well as a spirit squad.

Butler has won 10 NJCAA national championships, including six in football (1981, 1998, 1999, 2003, 2007, and 2008). Butler also has won national titles in men's basketball (1953), men's cross country (1970, 1995), women's cross country (2002), and softball (2016).

Butler Softball won 88 consecutive games, dating back to March 3, 2016 when the Grizzlies beat Barton Community College 9–1. This includes the 2016 NJCAA Div. I National Championship.

The softball team finished third nationally in 2013 after being ranked number 1 nationally for much of the season. That team won a program-record 54 games (54–4).

The Grizzlies finished third in the 2008 NATYCAA standings, which award points to each sports team based on their finish at national competition. It is Butler's highest finish in the NATYCAA standings.

Women's soccer has been among the final four twice as they reached the national semifinals in 2013 and 2015 and went to the national tournament in Melbourne, Florida, for six straight years (2011–2016).

The baseball team finished third in the 1994 NJCAA Division I World Series in Grand Junction, Colorado.

The women's basketball team was selected as an at-large team for the 2014 NJCAA Division I national tournament held in Salina. The Grizzlies won two games and reached round of eight before being beaten by Chipola (Fla.). The Grizzlies were 34–3 that season, a school record for wins.

Troy Morrell was the head football coach from 2000–2014. He compiled a record of 154–22 in 15 seasons and won three national titles (2003, 2007, 2008) in that span. Morrell has since been inducted into the NJCAA Hall of Fame as well as the Kansas Sports Hall of Fame.

== Notable people ==
=== Alumni ===
- John Grange, member of Kansas House of Representatives from 2005 to 2013
- Stephen Jackson, professional basketball player
- Roger Marshall, obstetrician, former US Rep for the Kansas 1st District (2017–2021), US Senator of Kansas
- Lee Nailon, professional basketball player
- Dennis Rader, serial killer known as "BTK"
- David Rickels, professional mixed martial artist
- Brent Sommerhauser, artist, sculptor, glassblower

=== Faculty ===
- Jackie Vietti, BCC president from 1993 to 2012
