= Albert R. Taylor =

American educator

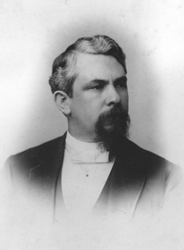
- Albert Taylor as president of KSN

1st President of Millikin University
- In office 1901–1920
- Preceded by: Position established
- Succeeded by: George Emory Fellows

5th President of Emporia State University
- In office July 1, 1882 – June 6, 1901
- Preceded by: Rudolph B. Welch
- Succeeded by: Jasper N. Wilkinson

Personal details
- Born: Albert Reynolds Taylor; October 16, 1846 Magnolia, Illinois
- Died: August 11, 1929 (aged 82) Decatur, Illinois
- Resting place: Emporia, Kansas
- Spouse: Minerva Dent (m. 1873–1929)
- Education: Lincoln University (B.S.; Ph.D)
- Occupation: Educator

Albert Reynolds Taylor (October 16, 1864 – August 11, 1929) was an American educator serving as president and professor at several institutions. Taylor was most notable for being a founder and the first president of Millikin University. Before serving as president of Millikin University, Taylor served as the Kansas State Normal School's fifth president.

== Biography ==
=== Early life and education ===
Taylor was born in 1846. Taylor originally attended Illinois State Normal in 1864, but left for Wenona Seminary and did not graduate. After various jobs, Taylor decided to return to school and attended Knox College before graduating in 1872 from Lincoln University. Taylor started his career in education as a professor.

=== Kansas State Normal ===
On July 1, 1882, Taylor succeeded Rudolph B. Welch as the fifth next president of the Kansas State Normal. Two years after becoming president, Taylor moved the school from a two-year institution to a four-year institution. Taylor decided that in order for enrollment grow, he would reimburse students who travelled more than a hundred miles to attend the school. Taylor resigned on June 6, 1901, to become president of Millikin University in Decatur, Illinois.

=== Millikin University ===
In 1901 Taylor became the first president of Millikin University. During his administration, many things happened on campus including United States President Theodore Roosevelt dedicated the new college, 562 students attended opening day, degrees awarded to the first four-year graduating class, a women's residence hall opened, and another U.S. President William Howard Taft gave a speech. Taylor resigned in 1913, but later returned in 1915 as president serving until 1920.

== Personal life ==
Taylor Minerva Dent in 1873 and had two daughters. On August 11, 1929, Taylor died.
