= Ken Hush =

American university president (born 1959)

18th President of Emporia State University
- In office November 17, 2021 – December 17, 2025; Interim: November 17, 2021–June 22, 2022
- Provost: George Arasimowicz (2021–2022); Brent Thomas (2022–2025)
- Preceded by: Allison Garrett
- Succeeded by: Matt Baker

Personal details
- Born: Kenneth James Hush; August 1, 1959 (age 67) Emporia, Kansas
- Party: Libertarian
- Spouse(s): Michelle Morris (m. 1986–2014) Patricia Miller (m. 2015, annulled)
- Children: 2
- Education: Emporia State University
- Profession: Businessman

Kenneth James Hush (born August 1, 1959) is an American retired businessman and 18th president of Emporia State University. Prior to serving as the president, Hush served as interim president from November 2021 to June 2022, and held multiple executive titles at Koch Minerals and Carbon. Hush is a former tennis player for Emporia State. Hush retired on December 17, 2025.

== Biography ==
=== Education ===
Born and raised in Emporia, Kansas, Hush graduated from Emporia State University with a business administration and marketing degree in 1982, and competed on the men's tennis team where he helped lead his team to four Central States Intercollegiate Conference championships and made three National Association of Intercollegiate Athletics national tournament appearances, making him the first alumni to serve as the university president and be in the Athletics Hall of Fame. Hush later served on the Emporia State University Foundation Board of Trustees, where he served as chairman, as well as serving on the Wichita State University Board of Trustees.

=== Early career ===
After college, Hush began his long career at Koch Industries working in the Minerals and Carbon division where he served in different leadership capacities. After leaving there, he became the general manager at Senior Commodity Company, and later returned to Emporia where he was owner and CEO of BLI Rentals.

=== Emporia State University ===
On November 17, 2021, Hush was announced as the interim president at Emporia State. On June 22, 2022, Hush was named the 18th president of Emporia State.

Hush, with no professional background in education, came under fire when his administration utilized the Kansas Board of Regents new policy allowing any employee to be fired for any reason – including tenured professors – and fired 33 professors from the university, citing budget restraints. Additionally, this led to restructuring the university's schools and colleges, as well as staff, to focus on core areas of the university's mission and reduce costs.

Hush announced that he was retiring on December 27, 2025.
