= Michael R. Lane =

American education admin (born 1952)

Michael Lane
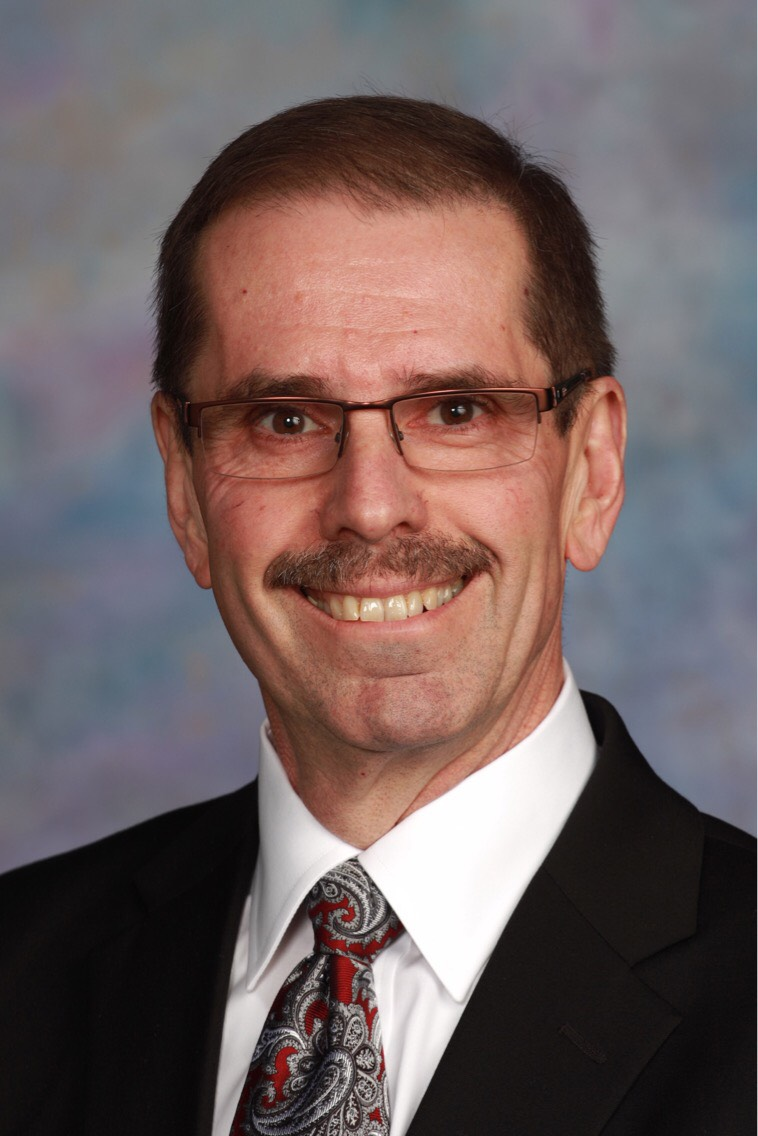

Dean of Craig School of Business at Missouri Western State University
- In office August 15, 2013 – June 30, 2018
- Preceded by: Philip Nitse
- Succeeded by: Logan Jones

15th President of Emporia State University
- In office November 1, 2006 – June 30, 2011
- Preceded by: Kay Schallenkamp; John O. Schwenn (interim)
- Succeeded by: Michael Shonrock

Personal details
- Born: Michael Robert Lane; May 1, 1952 (age 74) Melrose, Massachusetts
- Spouse: Peggy Lane
- Education: Lowell Technological Institute (BS); Northeastern University (MS); Texas A&M University (PhD)
- Occupation: Education

Michael Robert Lane (born May 1, 1952) is an American retired education administrator, ending his career as the dean of Missouri Western State University's Steven L. Craig School of Business in Saint Joseph, Missouri. Before becoming the dean at Missouri Western, Lane was Emporia State University's fifteenth president and an accounting professor from 2006 to 2011, and provost/vice president at several institutions.

== Biography ==
=== Education ===
Lane graduated as a business major from the Lowell Technological Institute and went on to graduate school at Northeastern University. After graduating for Northeastern University, Lane graduated with his doctorate from Texas A&M University.

=== Early career ===
Lane began his career in higher education in Boston at Northeastern University's College of Administration as an assistant professor. After three years at Northeastern, Lane various positions at Bradley University business school. In 1994, Lane became the dean of the Indiana University – Purdue University Fort Wayne School of Business. After serving as the dean at IUPFW, Lane then served as the Berry College Campbell School of Business dean in Rome, Georgia. After Berry College, Lane moved to Pennsylvania to become Mansfield University's provost and academic affairs vice president for four years. Then from 2005 to 2006, Lane served as the University of Arkansas – Fort Smith provost and the academic affairs vice chancellor.

=== Emporia State University ===
Lane began his five-year career as Emporia State University's fifteenth president, on November 1, 2006. Lane succeeded Kay Schallenkamp who left for Black Hills State University. During his tenure at Emporia State, Lane oversaw the largest renovation project, on campus, of the Memorial Union. On June 30, 2011, Lane stepped down to return to teaching accounting at Emporia State.
