= Albert C. Jacobs =

American academic, university chancellor

Albert Charles Jacobs served as the eleventh chancellor for University of Denver from 1949 to 1953. During his tenure of office, the student body increased in terms of both quantity and quality, admission standards were raised and new facilities were created. Jacobs was born on May 21, 1900, in Birmingham, Michigan. In 1921 he received his degree from the University of Michigan. That same year he entered Oriel College, Oxford as a Rhodes Scholar. From Oxford he earned his Bachelor of Civil Law and his Master of Arts degrees. In 1927, Jacobs joined the faculty of law at Columbia University specializing in property and family law. After World War II he returned to Columbia to accept the post of assistant to the president for administrative affairs. He was elected provost for the university a year later. Jacobs was a law professor and administrator at Columbia for twenty-five years. He became chancellor of University of Denver beginning in 1949. In 1953 Jacobs left the University of Denver to accept the position of president of Trinity College in Hartford, Connecticut, where he worked until 1968. After his retirement he served as president of the University of Michigan Emeritus Club from 1973 to 1974. Jacobs died on October 29, 1976.
