= John E. King =

American academic administrator (1913–2008)

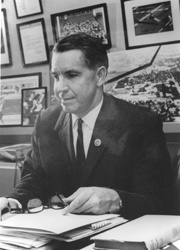

14th President of the University of Wyoming
- In office 1966–1967
- Preceded by: John T. Fey
- Succeeded by: William D. Carlson

11th President of the Kansas State Teachers College
- In office August 1, 1953 – July 31, 1966
- Preceded by: David L. MacFarlane
- Succeeded by: John E. Visser

Personal details
- Born: John Ethelbert King Jr. July 29, 1913 Oklahoma City, Oklahoma
- Died: June 28, 2008 (aged 94) West Columbia, South Carolina
- Resting place: West Columbia, South Carolina
- Spouse: Glennie Beanland (m. 1937)
- Relatives: W. Ann Reynolds (daughter)
- Education: North Texas State University; University of Arkansas; Cornell University
- Occupation: Educator

John Ethelbert King Jr. (July 29, 1913 – June 28, 2008) was an American educator and academic administrator who was provost of University of Minnesota Duluth from 1947 to 1953, before serving as president of what is now Emporia State University from 1953 to 1966 and then the University of Wyoming from 1966–1967.

== Professional life ==
King was raised in Texas and was educated in University of North Texas with an undergraduate degree. He received his M.S. degree from University of Arkansas in 1937 and went on to earn his Ph.D. degree from Cornell University in 1941. During World War II he served as lieutenant in the United States Navy and was released from active service in 1946.

After the War, he served as the provost of University of Minnesota Duluth for six years before becoming the 11th president of Kansas State Teachers College, now Emporia State University in 1953. During his 13 year tenure as president, the enrollment increased six-fold, reaching its highest enrollment ever and scholarships are also increased in number.

In 1966, he left Emporia State to take a position as president of the University of Wyoming. From 1968 to 1970, he served as professor and chair of educational administration and foundations at Southern Illinois University (SIU), then becoming chair of the higher education department in 1970. He chaired or served on approximately 200 master’s or doctoral committees during his term at SIU.

He was recognized as an expert in teacher education and higher education governance, and was a pioneer in making higher education accessible to students with physical disabilities. President John F. Kennedy appointed him to the National Citizens' Advisory Committee on Vocational Rehabilitation in 1961 and President Lyndon B. Johnson appointed him to the National Committee on Employment of the Handicapped in 1964.

John E. King Hall at the Emporia State University, which houses the Theatre Department, and the Arts and Communication Departments, is named in his honor.

== Personal life ==
On Christmas day 1936 he married Glennie and went on to have two daughters Wynetka Ann and Rebecca and lived in West Columbia, South Carolina.
