= Dan Busby =

American accountant and president of the ECFA (1941–2022)

- Born: 1941; Kansas, U.S.
- Died: September 28, 2022 (aged 81); Winchester, Virginia, U.S.
- Education: Emporia State University (MBA)
- Occupation: Accountant
- Spouse: Claudette Busby (m. 1964)
- Children: 2

Dan Busby (1941 – September 28, 2022) was an American accountant. He served as president of the Evangelical Council for Financial Accountability from 2008 to 2020, the longest-serving president to date. Before he became president, he worked as an accountant for various organizations and founded his own accounting firm in 1975. Busby joined the ECFA in 1989 and became a full time staff member and senior vice president ten years later.

Busby's presidency of the ECFA saw memberships nearly double and a 97% retention rate. However, critics like Julie Roys point out that the ECFA under Busby failed to quickly suspend member organizations with significant financial mismanagement.

== Life and career ==
Busby was born in 1941 to Howard and Bertha Orr Busby. Raised in Lamont, Kansas, his mother worked as a schoolteacher and his father was a pastor of a Wesleyan Church. As a child, he frequently attended camp meetings and committed his life to Christianity at a meeting when he was fourteen years old. Busby also developed an interest in baseball, studying with a Minor League Baseball umpire so he could become a professional umpire himself.

Busby studied accounting at Emporia State University and received his Master of Business Administration there. In 2014, the university named him a distinguished alumnus. In 1964, Busby became a certified public accountant and married Claudette, with whom he would have two children. In the 1970s, Dan and Claudette produced three albums of gospel music and held over 200 concerts together. After receiving his MBA, Busby worked at the University of Kansas Medical Center as a comptroller and later founded a Kansas City accounting firm now known as Keller and Owens in 1975. The firm's clients were predominantly Christian ministries and Busby became an expert on accounting matters related to fundraising. Busby then stepped down from his position at the firm in 1985 to work as the chief financial officer at the Wesleyan Church.

In 1989, Busby joined the Evangelical Council for Financial Accountability as a volunteer member of their standards committee. Ten years later, he joined the ECFA staff and was elected senior vice president of the organization. In 2008, he became president. He was the first certified public accountant to lead the ECFA and strove to further professionalize the ministry and raise its standards. Under his leadership, the ECFA saw membership levels nearly double and the organization maintained a 97% retention rate.

When Senator Chuck Grassley initiated an investigation into six prosperity gospel ministries for misuse of donations in 2007, Busby convinced him in 2011 that additional financial regulations would infringe religious liberty and that self-regulation was the best response. Busby also helped form the Commission on Accountability and Policy for Religious Organizations in response to Grassley's investigation which recommended that ministries give "reasonable" compensation to leaders and that compensation information be available to donors upon request.

Busby grew wary of internet watchdogs and bloggers, believing their criticisms of church ministries to be reckless and unfair. In 2016, Busby was fined $9,000 for the unlicensed use of the CPA title. He had not renewed his Kansas CPA license since 2000 and had moved to Virginia two years earlier. Busby received another CPA license from the Virginia board of Accountancy in December 2016. Busby also came under fire from reporters like Julie Roys in 2019 for being slow to revoke accreditation to organizations with serious financial mismanagement. In 2020, he retired and became president emeritus, having been longest-serving president as of 2025.

After his retirement, Busby wrote books about Babe Ruth and Jackie Robinson based on memorabilia of the era; his final book was published a month before his death. Throughout his life, he visited every Major League Baseball stadium, including twenty no longer in existence. He was also a longtime member of the Society for American Baseball Research. After battling cancer, Busby died on September 28, 2022, at age 81, in his house in Winchester, Virginia.

== Selected bibliography ==
- Busby, Dan; Laue, Vonna; Martin, Michael; Van Drunen, John (1992). Zondervan's minister's tax and financial guide. Zondervan. OCLC 25140319.
- Busby, Dan (2015). Trust: The Firm Foundation for Kingdom Fruitfulness. ECFA Press. ISBN 9781936233229.
- Busby, Dan (2018). Before and after Babe Ruth: A story of the New York Yankees told through the lens of Tickets and Passes. Foundation for Baseball Ticket Research. ISBN 9781732469105.
- Busby, Dan; Pearson, John (2019). Lessons from the Church Boardroom: 40 Insights for Exceptional Governance. EFCA Press. ISBN 9781949365153.
- Busby, Dan (2022). Before and After Jackie Robinson, A Story of the Brooklyn Dodgers Told Through the Lens of Tickets and Passes. Foundation for Baseball Ticket Research. ISBN 9781732469112.
