= Michael Shonrock =

American academic

Michael D. Shonrock

22nd President of Lindenwood University
- In office June 1, 2015 – February 8, 2019
- Preceded by: James D. Evans
- Succeeded by: John R. Porter

16th President of Emporia State University
- In office January 3, 2012 – May 29, 2015
- Preceded by: Michael R. Lane
- Succeeded by: Allison Garrett

Personal details
- Born: August 6, 1957 (age 69) Chicago, Illinois
- Spouse: Karen Corkery
- Education: Western Illinois University; Pittsburg State University; University of Kansas
- Profession: Professor

Michael D. Shonrock (born August 6, 1957 in Chicago, Illinois) is an American academic and former administrator. He was the president of Lindenwood University, located in St. Charles, Missouri, June 2015 to February 2019. Shonrock previously served as Emporia State University's 16th president from January 3, 2012 to May 28, 2015, and before that as Texas Tech University's vice president for student affairs and enrollment management in Lubbock, Texas.

== Education ==
Shonrock received his bachelor of science in 1979 from Western Illinois University, and attended Pittsburg State University for his master's of science in 1981 and Ed.S. in 1987, and graduated from University of Kansas in 1991 with his doctorate. During his time as an undergraduate, Shonrock was a member of Delta Tau Delta fraternity.

== Career ==
=== Texas Tech University ===
After graduating from KU, Shonrock began his career in education in 1991, as an assistant professor in the Texas Tech University College of Education. Shonrock was mostly known in the 2008 planning of Texas Tech's $3-million on-campus chapel and announced that "no religious affiliations will be included and there will be stained-glass windows without religious images, and movable chairs, rather than pews." Shonrock was involved in the leadership of the Lubbock Area United Way, the Lubbock Chamber of Commerce, and the University Medical Center. He attended the United Methodist Church.

He has held leadership positions in the National Association of State Universities and Land-Grant Colleges; in 2000 he received the Texas Tech University President's Quality Service Award.

=== Emporia State University presidency ===
Shonrock was named Emporia State's 16th president in December 2011, in which he would begin January 2, 2012. During Shonrock’s administration at Emporia State, the university launched a $45 million fundraising campaign, the largest in Emporia State's history, increased enrollment growth, and received additional funding from the Government of Kansas for an honors college. Shonrock also led the development of a new ten-year campus master plan, a new university strategic plan, a new marketing campaign, better communication with alumni, and created new partnerships with the community. Shonrock also started a bi-weekly radio segment called ESU Buzz with President Michael Shonrock on KVOE, which always had special guest and discussed current events happening at Emporia State University. Shonrock's last day at Emporia State was May 28 as he left to become the President of Lindenwood University. He was removed a couple of years later due to extremely poor performance and creating a toxic environment.
