= Government of Kansas =

State government of the United States

- Logo of the Kansan government Great Seal of the State of Kansas
- Part of: United States of America
- Constitution: Constitution of Kansas

The government of the U.S. state of Kansas, established by the Kansas Constitution, is a republican democracy modeled after the Federal Government of the United States. The state government has three branches: the executive, the legislative, and the judicial. Through a system of separation of powers, or "checks and balances," each of these branches has some authority to act on its own, and also some authority to regulate the other two branches, so that all three branches can limit and balance the others' authority.

The state government is based in Topeka, Kansas.

== General principles ==
The state government of Kansas is divided into an executive, a legislative and a judicial branch. The Governor, the state's chief executive, has a degree of direct executive power, but must share executive power with other statewide elected officers. The lieutenant governor serves as the first-in-line successor to the governorship, should a vacancy occur.

The Legislature comprises the House of Representatives and the Senate. It passes statutes, votes on the budget, and controls the action of the executive through oversight and the power of impeachment. The President of the Kansas Senate presides over the Senate and the Speaker of the House presides over the House of Representatives. Both officers are in line behind the lieutenant governor to succeed to the governorship in the event of a vacancy.

The independent judiciary is based on the common law system which evolved from use in the British Empire. It is divided into the two courts of last resort, one (the Supreme Court) dealing with civil law and the other (the Court of Appeals) dealing with criminal law. The Court of Impeachment monitors the activities of all statewide elected officials, including the Justices of the Supreme Court.

The people of the state reserve the right to directly participate in the government by referendum, recall, and ratification.

== Constitution ==
The Wyandotte Constitution was approved in a referendum by a vote of 10,421 to 5,530 on October 4, 1859. In April 1860, the United States House of Representatives voted 134 to 73 to admit Kansas under the Wyandotte Constitution; however, Senators from slave-holding states resisted passing the measure in the United States Senate. As the Civil War escalated and slave-holding states seceded from the Union, senators from the slave-holding states began to withdraw from their seats. On January 21, 1861, after several more senatorial withdrawals, the remaining members of the Senate passed the bill, and President James Buchanan signed it on January 29, 1861, officially admitting Kansas as a free state.

== Executive branch ==
The executive branch of Kansas's government is headed by the Governor of Kansas, who is assisted in managing the executive branch by Cabinet Secretaries appointed by the governor with the consent of the Kansas Senate. The Lieutenant Governor of Kansas is in line to succeed to the governorship in the event of a vacancy. The governor determines the role that the lieutenant governor performs.

=== Elected officials ===
Elected executive officials in Kansas
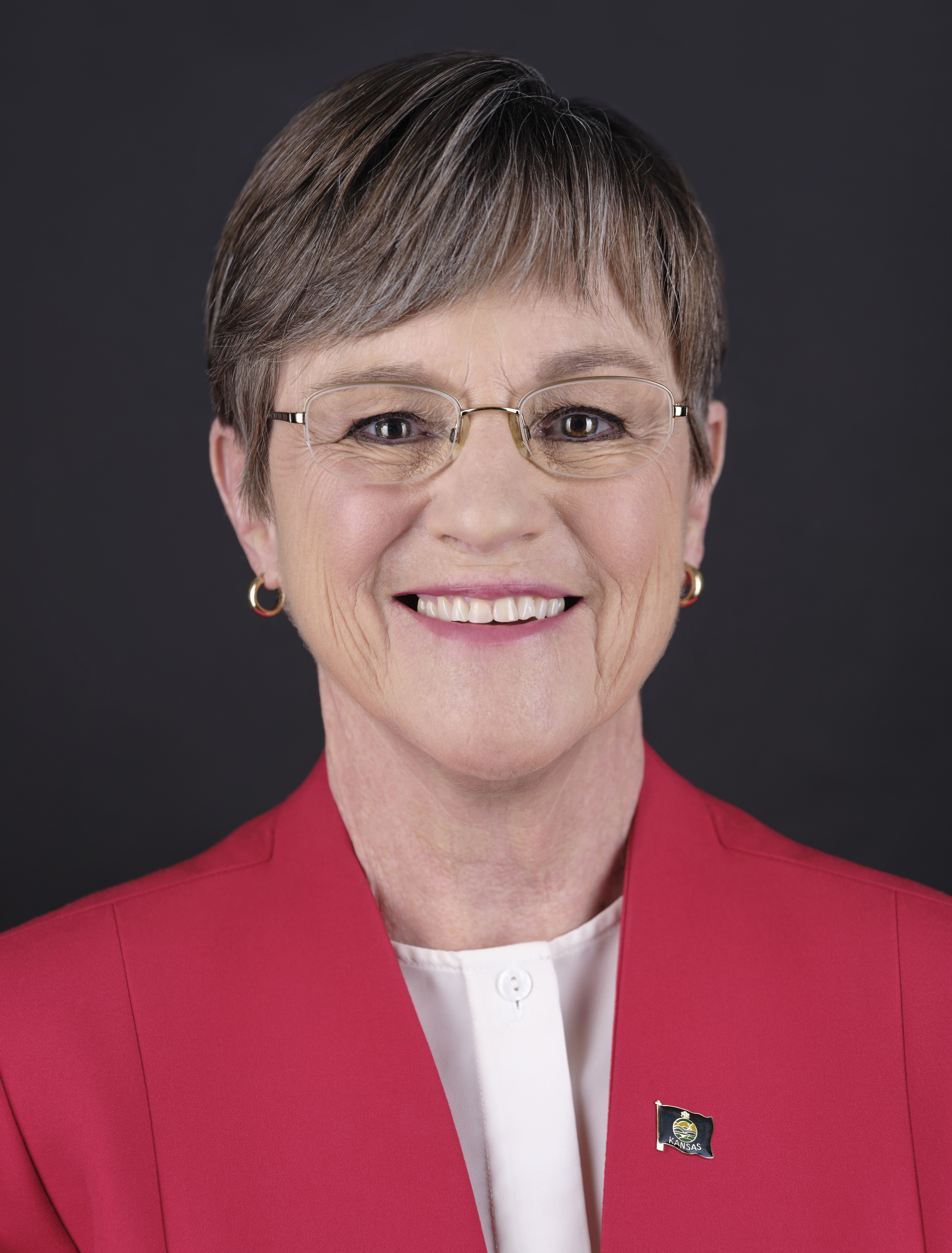
Laura Kelly (D)
Governor

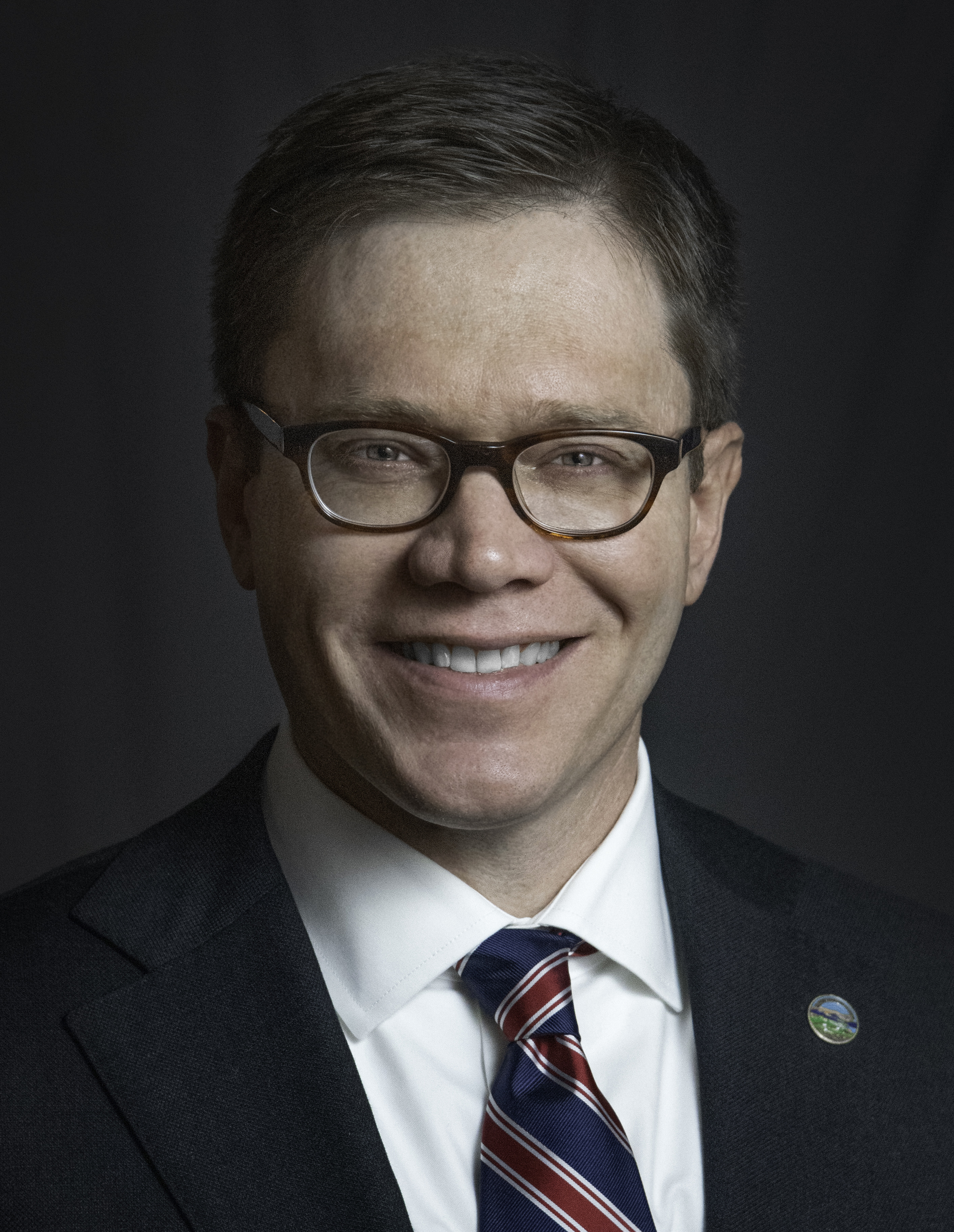
David Toland (D)
Lieutenant Governor

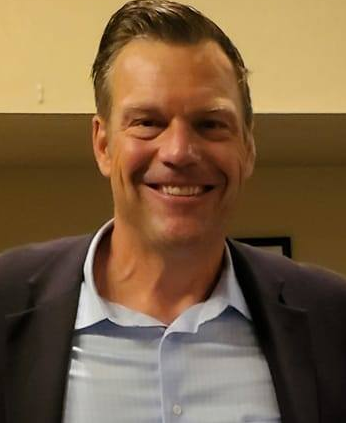
Kris Kobach (R)
Attorney General

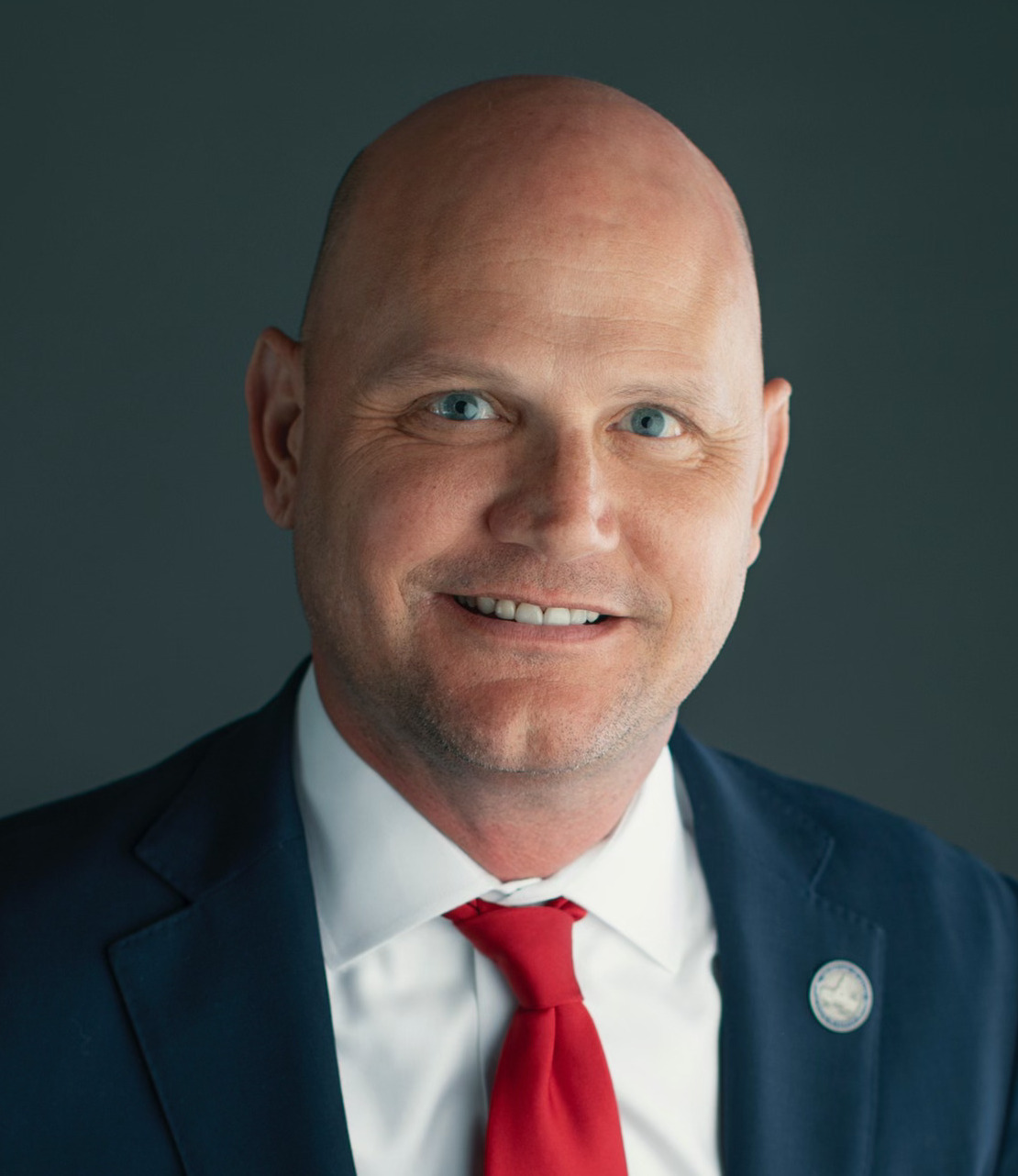
Scott Schwab (R)
Secretary of State

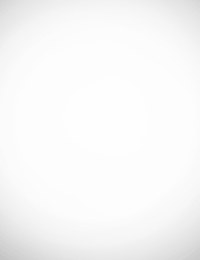
Steven Johnson (R)
State Treasurer

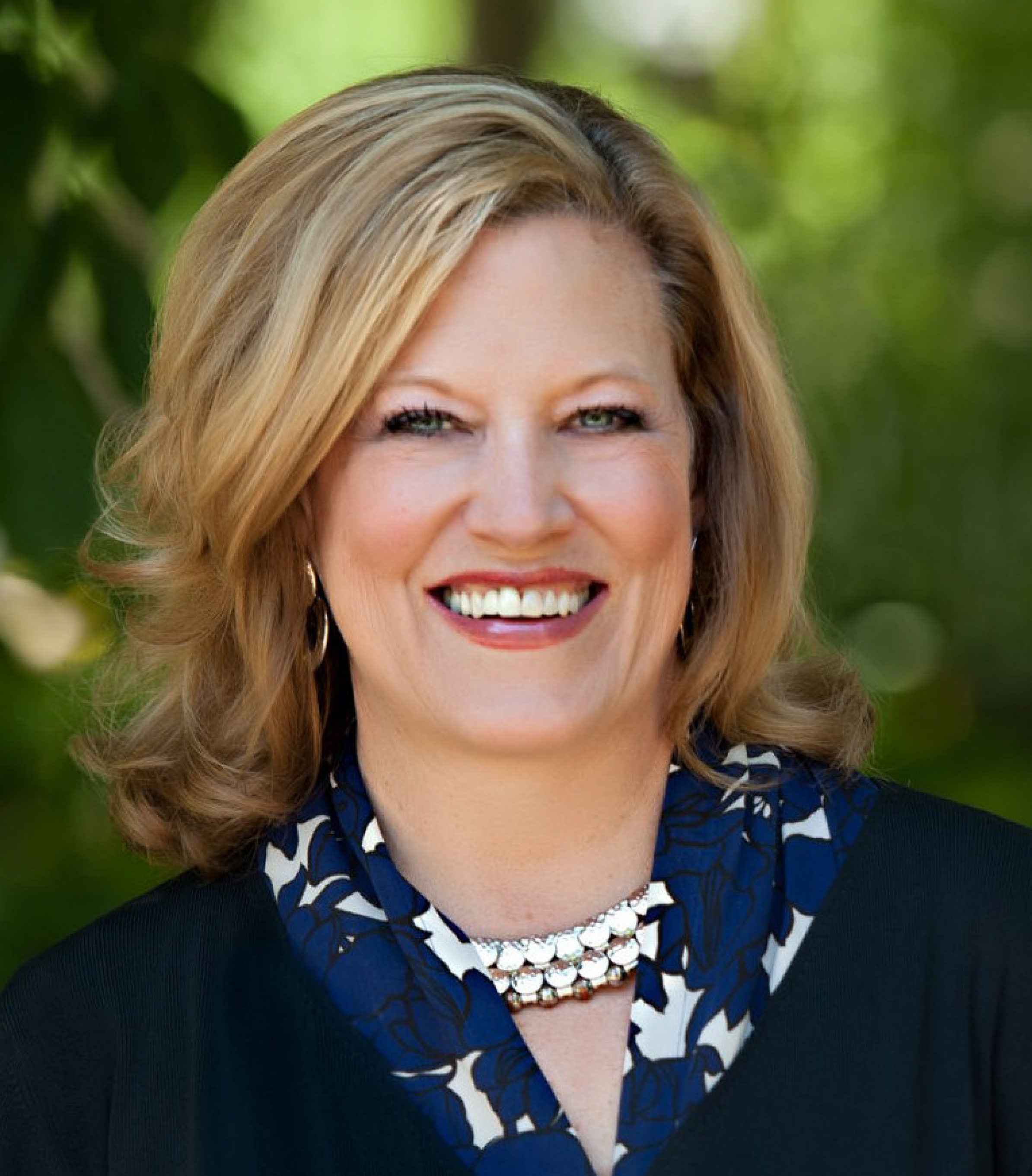
Vicki Schmidt (R)
Insurance Commissioner

=== Governor of Kansas ===
The governor is both head of state and head of government for Kansas. Under the constitution, the governor is elected to serve a four-year term. The governor presides over the executive branch, commands the militia of the state, and makes sure that the laws of the state are enforced and that the peace is preserved. The governor is the state's chief representative and spokesperson to the other states within the United States, the Federal Government of the United States, and all foreign nations. The governor must sign all bills passed by the legislature in order for those bills to become law. Should the governor veto a bill, the legislature may override the governor's veto with a two-thirds vote.

Normally, the governor may not enact legislation, but when empowered to do so by the legislature, the governor may issue executive orders which are binding throughout the State. Even so, such executive orders do not have the force of law and may only be issued when related directly to the governor's duties. Of course, if the legislature is controlled by the governor's political party, the governor may strongly suggest the adoption of certain legislation, or request other executive officers to take such actions as the governor sees fit. In certain emergencies the governor may assume special, comprehensive powers. These powers involve greater police power and near-absolute control over state, county, and local agencies and resources.

In order to be elected governor, any gubernatorial candidate is required to obtain a statewide plurality of all votes cast in their election. Given the dominance of the two-party system in Kansas (between the Democrats and the Republicans), the plurality is often a majority as well. However, in the event that two or more candidates have an equal number of votes, the legislature, by joint ballot, elects one of those candidates governor.

The state constitution names the governor the state's chief magistrate and vests supreme executive power in them. As a consequence, the governor is the preeminent figure in Kansas politics. Though the governor shares power with many other executive officers, in the event of a vacancy anywhere in the executive branch, the governor appoints their successor. The governor appoints the heads of most all state departments and agencies, as well as the members of most state commissions and boards. However, these appointments do require Senate approval. Some serve at the governor's pleasure, while others serve fixed terms.

=== Lieutenant governor ===
The lieutenant governor is the second-highest official in the Kansas government and the first in line to succeed to the governorship in the event of a vacancy. The lieutenant governor is elected for a four-year term that runs concurrent with that of the governor. In the absence of the governor, the lieutenant governor assumes all powers and duties of office of governor. However, this only happens when the governor leaves the state or becomes incapable of discharging his/her duties as governor.

== Legislative branch ==
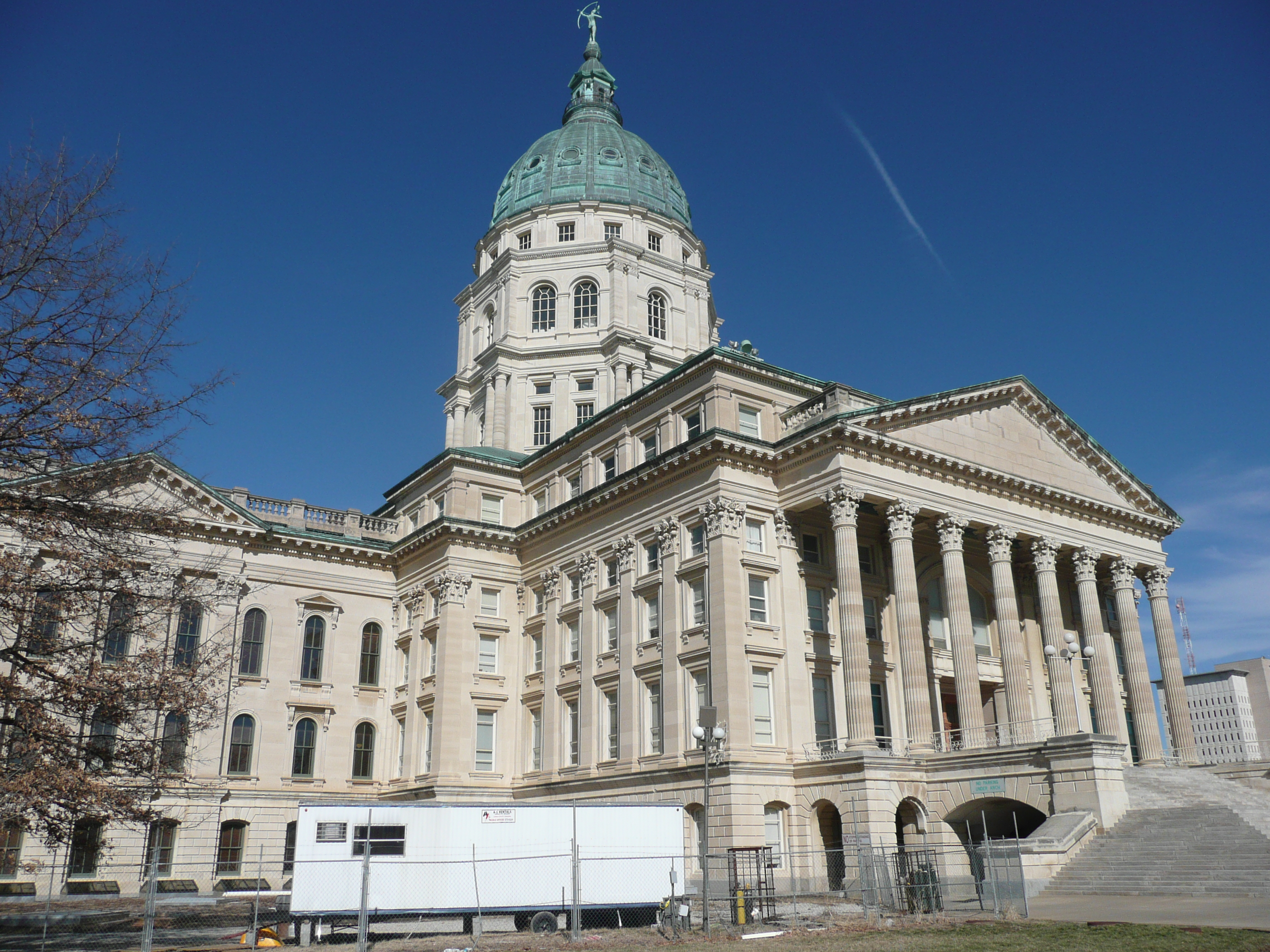
The Kansas Legislature meets in the Kansas State Capitol.

The Kansas Legislature, the state's legislative branch, consists of two chambers: the Senate and the House of Representatives. All of the State's legislative authority is vested within the legislature. The most important of these powers are the powers to levy and collect taxes, borrow money, and raise and maintain the militia of the State. The constitution grants the legislature the authority to legislate on all rightful subjects of legislation.

The legislature meets normally once a year. Meetings begin in January and usually will last for a period of 90 days. Under special circumstances, the governor can call special sessions. The governor has a strong influence in shaping the agenda of the legislature. All acts of the legislature must be approved by a majority in both houses and signed by the governor to be enacted into law. However, should the governor veto the bill, the legislature, by a two-thirds vote in both houses, may over turn the governor's veto and the bill be enacted into law without the governor's signature. On appropriations bills, the governor has a line-item veto.

=== Senate ===
The Senate is the upper house of the legislature, with its 40 seats divided equally among the state's 40 senatorial districts. The State Senators serve a four-year staggered term, with half of the Senate up for reelection every even-numbered year. The lieutenant governor does not preside over the Senate; rather, the Senate elects its own President, who, in addition to their legislative duties, is third in line to succeed the governor.

=== House of Representatives ===
The House of Representatives is the lower house of the legislature, with its 125 seats divided proportionally according to each county's population. Each member serves for a two-year term, with the entire House up for reelection every even numbered year. The presiding officer in the House is the Speaker of the Kansas House of Representatives, who is fourth in line to succeed the governor after the lieutenant governor and President of the Senate.

All bills for raising revenue must originate in the House of Representatives, though the Senate may alter and amend them as the body sees fit.

== Judicial branch ==
The judicial system of Kansas is the branch of the Kansas state government that interprets the state's laws and constitution. Headed by the Kansas Supreme Court, the judiciary consists of two courts of last resort, courts of general jurisdiction, and courts of limited jurisdiction. Also, the Kansas judiciary contains two independent courts.

All judges and justices requiring appointment are appointed by the governor. Candidates must first go through a nominating process through the Kansas Judicial Nominating Commission, which selects three candidates to submit to the governor for a single selection to the office.

=== Supreme Court ===
The Supreme Court consists of a chief justice and seven associate justices, who are appointed by the governor from a list of three judges submitted by the Judicial Nomination Commission. Justices are also ratified by the electorate at the next general election following their appointment and at the end of each six-year term. Justices serve until they resign or fail to be retained in office. The Supreme Court's decisions are binding on all lower state courts.

The court has original jurisdiction, and has general superintendent control over all inferior courts in the judiciary, as well as all agencies, commissions and boards exercising power under the constitution. The court has appellate jurisdiction co-extensive with that of the state's borders on all cases "at law and in equity" except criminal cases, in which the Court of Criminal Appeals has exclusive appellate jurisdiction. If in any event there is any conflict in determining which court has jurisdiction, the Supreme Court is granted the power to determine which court has jurisdiction, with no appeal from the court's determination.

The Supreme Court is headquartered in the Kansas Judicial Center in Topeka, Kansas and hears oral arguments every year.

The Supreme Court supervises the lower courts through the Administrative Office of the Courts, and it also supervises Kansas's legal profession through the Kansas Bar Association. All lawyer admissions and disbarments are done through recommendations of the association, which are then routinely ratified by the Supreme Court. The association has 6,900 members, including lawyers, judges, law students, and paralegals.

Four of the seven justices are required to affirm, modify, or overturn any ruling of any lower court. Once the court has reached a decision, one justice is selected to write the court's opinion. Once published, the opinion becomes the controlling factor in the state's law surrounding the issue(s) it addresses. This is known as stare decisis.

The Kansas Constitution designates that the justice who has the longest continuous term of service on the Court will serve as the chief justice, unless the justice declines or resigns the position. The Chief Justice of Kansas is responsible for the administration of all courts in the Kansas Judiciary and establishes rules for all courts to follow. The Chief Justice also oversees all practicing attorneys in the State.

== County government ==
The county is the primary administrative division of Kansas. They are bodies politic and corporate. There are one hundred and five counties in the state. Counties contain a number of towns and cities, as well as all unincorporated land in the state. Every county has a county seat, often a populous or centrally located city or town, where the county government is headquartered.

In traditional Midwestern fashion, counties in Kansas possess a moderate scope of power. As extensions of the state government, counties are primarily administrative bodies which possess executive and limited judicial powers, but not legislative powers. Their primary responsibilities are related to managing, planning for, and governing all unincorporated land within their borders. These include overall planning, police service, and some legal services. The counties keep records of deaths, births, marriages, divorces, property ownership, and court activities within the county. The counties must also maintain a court system, law enforcement, road and bridge construction, and voter registration.

As extensions of the state government, the counties are responsible for six major services:

- Maintaining the peace and protecting life and property
- Assessing and collecting taxes to operate the county
- Compiling, recording, and preserving public records essential to maintaining individual property rights
- Building and maintaining public roads, highways, and bridges
- Providing facilities for courts and the administration of justice through the District Court system
- Stimulate economic development and private sector job creation in all areas of the state, participate in the development of a capital formation system, and have a limited role in such system through investment of state funds authorized in accordance with law
- Caring for the needy and indigent, orphaned children, and the aged

Each county government is composed of eight elected officials and a district attorney. All county officials serve four-year terms beginning on the first Monday in January following their election.

== See also ==
- List of cities in Kansas
- List of townships in Kansas
