= David L. MacFarlane =

American educator

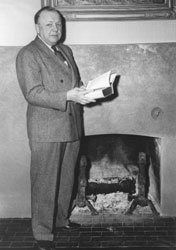

10th President of the Kansas State Teachers College
- In office July 1, 1945 – January 3, 1953
- Preceded by: James F. Price
- Succeeded by: John E. King

Personal details
- Born: David L. MacFarlane; March 13, 1893 Dundee, Scotland
- Died: January 3, 1953 (aged 59) Emporia, Kansas
- Resting place: Emporia, Kansas
- Spouse: Mildred S. MacFarlane
- Education: Northwestern University; University of Edinburgh
- Occupation: Educator

Military service
- Branch/service: Army
- Years of service: 1916–1928
- Rank: 2nd LTC
- Battles/wars: World War I

David L. MacFarlane (March 13, 1893 – January 3, 1953) was an American educator most notable for serving as president of the Kansas State Teachers College (KSTC), now known as Emporia State University. Before heading the Kansas State Teachers College, MacFarlane was a professor of history in a couple of institutions in Kansas.

== Biography ==
=== Early life and education ===
David L. MacFarlane was born on March 13, 1893, in Dundee, Scotland and moved to West Warren, Massachusetts, at the age of five. He received both his Bachelor of Arts and Master of Arts from Northwestern University, graduating in 1916 and 1917. He received his doctorate in 1931 from the University of Edinburgh.

During World War I, MacFarlane joined the United States Army serving as a second lieutenant of the infantry. He also served in the United States Army Reserve until 1928. In 1922, he became a professor and head of the history department at Southwestern College from 1922 to 1935.

=== Kansas State Teachers College ===
In 1935, MacFarlane was hired as a professor in history at the Kansas State Teachers College in Emporia, Kansas. In 1936, he became dean of men at KSTC and held that position for nine years until being selected as KSTC's tenth president. During MacFarlane's tenure, he was able to gain funds to build the William Allen White Library on the south side of campus and build new residence halls on the north side of campus. in 1952, MacFarlane suffered from heart problems and later died, on January 3, 1953, while still in office.
