= Allison Garrett =

American attorney (born 1964)

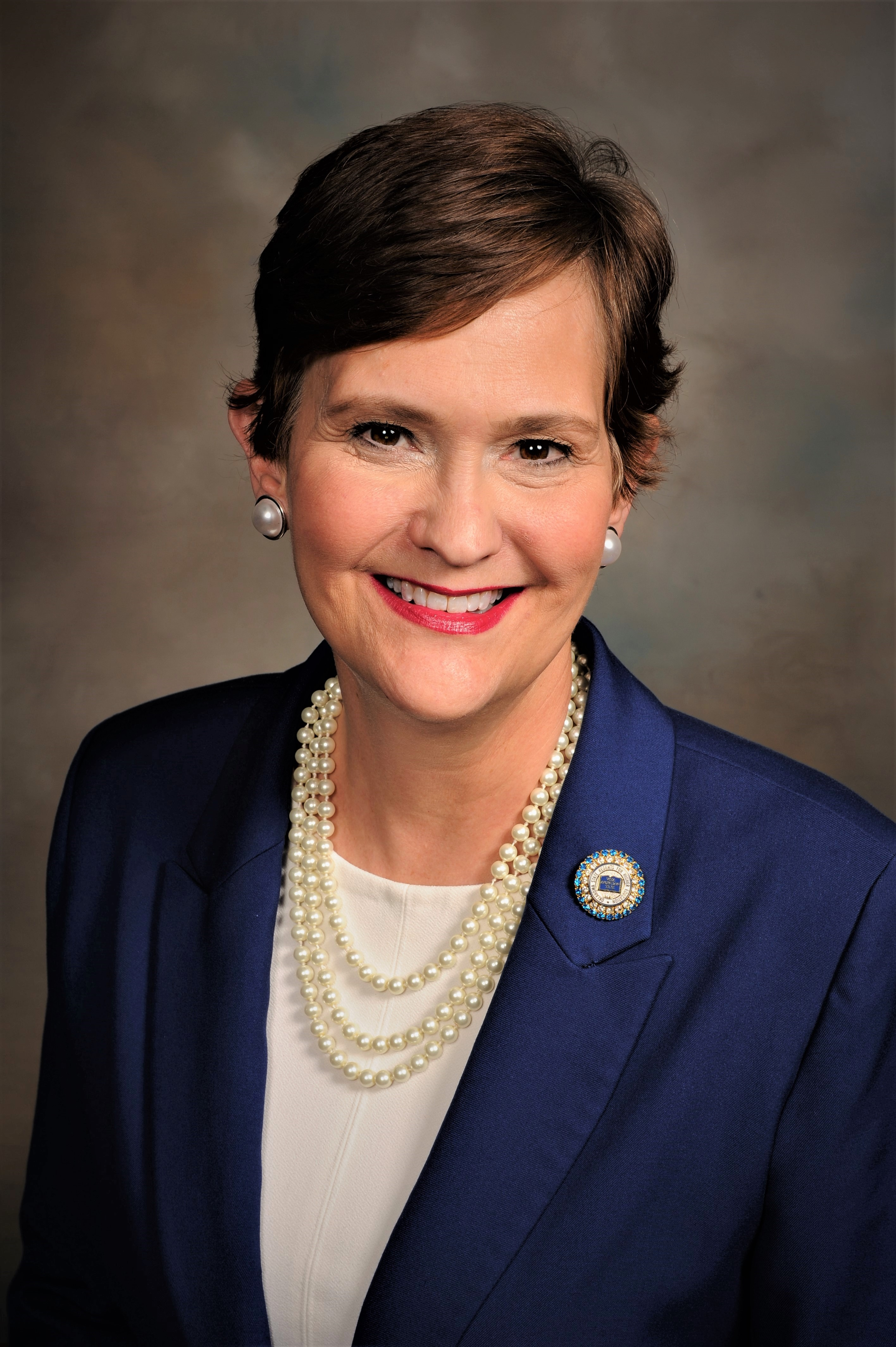

9th Chancellor of the Oklahoma State System of Higher Education
- In office November 8, 2021 – December 2, 2024
- Preceded by: Glen D. Johnson Jr.
- Succeeded by: Sean Burrage

17th President of Emporia State University
- In office January 4, 2016 – October 15, 2021
- Provost: David Cordle (2016–2021); George Arasimowicz (2021)
- Preceded by: Michael Shonrock
- Succeeded by: Ken Hush

Executive Vice President of Abilene Christian University
- In office August 20, 2012 – December 23, 2015
- Preceded by: Phil Schubert
- Succeeded by: Kevin Campbell

Personal details
- Born: Allison Dabbs; 1964 (age 61–62) Neosho, Missouri, U.S.
- Spouse: Chip
- Children: 3
- Education: Oklahoma Christian College; University of Tulsa; Georgetown University
- Profession: Attorney and Educator
- Salary: $415,000

Allison Dabbs Garrett (born 1964) is an American attorney, inventor, educator, and the former chancellor of the Oklahoma State System of Higher Education. She previously served as the 17th president of Emporia State University from January 2016 to October 2021. Prior to her time at Emporia State, Garrett served as Abilene Christian University's executive vice president, a position she held from August 20, 2012, to December 23, 2015. Garrett has held several vice president positions in both education and the private sector.

== Biography ==
=== Education ===
Born and raised in Neosho, Missouri, Garrett graduated from Oklahoma Christian College as an English major in 1984, as well as the University of Tulsa's College of Law in 1987 with her Doctor of Jurisprudence. Her Master of Laws degree came from the Georgetown University's Law Center in 1992.

=== Career ===
==== Early and pre-education career ====
While attending Georgetown Law, Garrett worked at the U.S. Securities and Exchange Commission from 1988 to 1991 as a staff attorney. In 1994, Garrett moved to Bentonville, Arkansas to work for Walmart Stores, Inc., where she served as vice president and general counsel for the corporate division and as vice president of benefits compliance and planning. Garrett also holds a U.S. patent for a media disk holder, granted in 2003.

==== Education ====
After spending a decade with Walmart, Garrett moved to Montgomery, Alabama to serve as an assistant professor of law at Faulkner University's Thomas Goode Jones School of Law. Three years later in April 2007, Garrett was named Oklahoma Christian University's senior vice president for academic affairs in Oklahoma City, Oklahoma. While at Oklahoma Christian, Garrett oversaw the colleges, the school's library, the Honors program, and various other programs.

On August 20, 2012, Garrett began her three-and-a-half-year term at Abilene Christian University. While at ACU, Garrett oversaw the financial operations, enrollment, and marketing, as well as the university's facilities. Garrett also worked with academics, advancement and athletics, as well as chairing several university committees. On October 22, 2015, Garrett was named Emporia State University's 17th president. She began her work as ESU's president in January 2016.

During her time at Emporia State, Garrett helped Emporia State achieve increased enrollment in the graduate school, set fundraising records for the university, and helped oversee projects including an aquatic research center, a new house for the university president, a new tennis complex, and a new residence hall. As ESU president, she served as vice chair of the NCAA Board of Governors and as chair of the NCAA Division II Presidents’ Council.

On September 24, 2021, she was named the first woman and ninth chancellor of the Oklahoma State System of Higher Education. Garrett led a state system comprising 25 state colleges and universities, 11 constituent agencies, one university center, and independent colleges and universities coordinated with the state system. She reported to a constitutional board whose nine members are appointed by the governor and confirmed by the Senate. Garrett directed 20 statewide scholarship programs, including the Oklahoma's Promise scholarship program, and statewide GEAR UP efforts. She was appointed by Gov. Kevin Stitt in November 2021 to serve a three-year term as an Oklahoma designee to the Southern Regional Education Board (SREB). In April 2024, Garrett was named by The Journal Record as one of Oklahoma's Most Admired CEOs. In November 2024, Garrett received the Oklahoma National Guard's Oklahoma Thunderbird Medal, which is the highest honor presented to a civilian.

On July 2, 2024, Garrett announced her intention to retire. Following a national search, she worked with her successor, Sean Burrage, during a "near-seamless" transition. Garrett's retirement took effect December 2, 2024.
