= 2018–19 Emporia State Lady Hornets basketball team =

Intercollegiate basketball season

2018–19 Emporia State Lady Hornets basketball

NCAA Central Regional, L, 65–71
- Conference: Mid-America Intercollegiate Athletics Association
- Record: 22–9 (13–6 The MIAA)
- Head coach: Toby Wynn (1st season)
- Assistant coaches: Kiel Unruh; Brooke Costley (GA)
- Home arena: William L. White Auditorium

The 2018–19 Emporia State Lady Hornets basketball team represented Emporia State University in the 2018–19 NCAA Division II women's basketball season, which was the 45th Lady Hornets basketball season. The Lady Hornets were led by first-year head coach Toby Wynn. The team played their home games on Slaymaker Court William L. White Auditorium in Emporia, Kansas, the home court since 1974. Emporia State is a member of the Mid-America Intercollegiate Athletics Association.

== Preseason outlook ==
The Lady Hornets enter the 2018–19 season after finishing with a 17–11 overall, 11–8 in conference play last season under Jory Collins. Losing in the MIAA Tournament caused the team's first Tournament loss in 16 games, winning the tournament for the past 5 years.

Collins announced his resignation on March 12, 2018 to become an assistant coach for former boss and former Lady Hornet basketball coach, Brandon Schneider, at the University of Kansas. On April 6, 2018, Toby Wynn, head coach of the Seward County Saints women's basketball program, was announced as the seventh head coach in Lady Hornet history. Wynn had a winning record of 349–84 .806 while at Seward County and won four Kansas Jayhawk Community College Conference championships.

On October 9, 2018, the Lady Hornets were chosen to finish third in the coaches poll and fourth in the media poll in the MIAA.

== 2018–19 Roster ==
2018–19 Emporia State Hornets women's basketball team
Players
Coaches

Pos.	#	Name	Height	Year	Previous school	Hometown
G	3	Tre'Zure Jobe	5 ft 7 in (1.7 m)	Fr	Wichita South HS	Wichita, Kansas
G	10	Kali Martin	5 ft 8 in (1.73 m)	So	Circle HS	El Dorado, Kansas
F	12	Morgan Laudan	5 ft 10 in (1.78 m)	Jr	Paola HS	Paola, Kansas
G	13	Brittany Kramer	5 ft 9 in (1.75 m)	RS Sr	Hesston College	Melvern, Kansas
G	14	Karsen Schultz	5 ft 10 in (1.78 m)	Fr	Wabaunsee HS	Alma, Kansas
F/C	20	Tiana Moala	6 ft 3 in (1.91 m)	Sr	Paola HS	Paola, Kansas
G	21	Jessica Wayne	5 ft 9 in (1.75 m)	Jr	Piper HS	Kansas City, Kansas
G	24	Addie Lackey	5 ft 9 in (1.75 m)		Hillsboro HS	Hillsboro, Kansas
F	30	Daley Handy	6 ft 0 in (1.83 m)	Jr	Maize HS	Wichita, Kansas
F	31	Tatum Graves	6 ft 2 in (1.88 m)	Sr	Shawnee Mission Northwest HS	Shawnee, Kansas
G/F	33	Kyrstie Miller	5 ft 10 in (1.78 m)		Holton HS	Holton, Kansas
F	35	Tyra Jones	6 ft 0 in (1.83 m)	Sr	Labette CC	Detroit, Michigan
G/F	44	Emily Miller	5 ft 10 in (1.78 m)	Sr	Drury University	Columbia, Missouri

Head coach

Toby Wynn

Assistant coach(es)

Kiel Unruh
Brooke Costley (GA)

Legend

- (C) Team captain
- (S) Suspended
- (I) Ineligible
- (W) Walk-on
- Injured
- Current redshirt

Roster
Last update: September 28, 2018

== Media ==
The Lady Hornets basketball games are broadcast on KFFX-FM, Mix 104.9.

== Schedule ==
Date time, TV	Rank^{#}	Opponent^{#}	Result	Record	Site city, state
Exhibition
November 5, 2018*; 5:30 pm		Bethel	W 89–36	–	William L. White Auditorium (1,327); Emporia, Kansas
Non-conference regular season
November 9, 2018*; 5:30 pm		at No. 20 Southwestern Oklahoma State; MIAA/GAC Challenge	W 68–60	1–0	Noble Complex (169); Shawnee, Oklahoma
November 10, 2018*; 4:00 pm		at Oklahoma Baptist; MIAA/GAC Challenge	W 88–61	2–0	Noble Complex; Shawnee, Oklahoma
November 15, 2018*; 7:00 pm		at Northwestern Oklahoma State	W 93–47	3–0	Percefull Fieldhouse (746); Alva, Oklahoma
November 19, 2018*; 5:30 pm		at Cameron	W 86–72	3–1	Aggie Gym (394); Lawton, Oklahoma
November 23, 2018*; 7:30 pm	No. 24	Arkansas–Fort Smith; Thanksgiving Classic	W 66–60	4–1	William L. White Auditorium (1,264); Emporia, Kansas
November 24, 2018*; 3:30 pm	No. 24	Northern State; Thanksgiving Classic	W 72–60	5–1	William L. White Auditorium (1,179); Emporia, Kansas
December 1, 2018*; 5:30 pm	No. 25	Newman	W 82–64	6–1	William L. White Auditorium (1,257); Emporia, Kansas
MIAA regular season
December 6, 2018; 5:30 pm	No. 24	at Nebraska–Kearney	W 72–64	7–1 (1–0)	William L. White Auditorium (1,202); Emporia, Kansas
December 8, 2018; 1:30 pm	No. 24	at No. 9 Fort Hays State	W 84–74	7–2 (1–1)	Gross Memorial Coliseum (2,617); Hays, Kansas
December 17, 2018*; 5:00 pm	No. 23	at Puerto Rico–Río Piedras; Puerto Rico Classic	W 67–39	8–2	Rafael A. Mangual Coliseum (50); San Juan, Puerto Rico
December 18, 2018*; 5:30 pm	No. 23	at Puerto Rico–Bayamón; Puerto Rico Classic	W 67–38	9–2	Unknown (50); Bayamón, Puerto Rico
December 30, 2018*; 5:30 pm	No. 23	No. 23 Baker	W 84–54	10–2 (1–1)	William L. White Auditorium (1,028); Emporia, Kansas
January 5, 2019; 5:30 pm	No. 23	Washburn; Turnpike Tussle	W 96–88 ^{2 OT}	10–3 (1–2)	William L. White Auditorium (2,467) [Emporia, Kansas
January 9, 2019; 5:30 pm		at Northwest Missouri State	W 54–41	11–3 (2–2)	Bearcat Arena (627); Maryville, Missouri
January 12, 2019; 1:30 pm		at Missouri Western	L 66–68	11–4 (2–3)	MWSU Fieldhouse at Looney Complex (781); St. Joseph, Missouri
January 16, 2019; 5:30 pm		No. 3 Fort Hays State	W 54–51	12–4 (3–3)	William L. White Auditorium (2,024); Emporia, Kansas
January 19, 2019; 1:30 pm		Nebraska–Kearney	L 62–64	12–5 (3–4)	William L. White Auditorium (1,028); Emporia, Kansas
January 23, 2019; 5:30 pm		at No. 23 Pittsburg State	W 77–71	13–5 (4–4)	John Lance Arena (1,383); Pittsburg, Kansas
January 26, 2019; 1:30 pm		at Missouri Southern	W 76–61	14–5 (5–4)	Leggett & Platt Athletic Center (1,262); Joplin, Missouri
January 31, 2019; 5:30 pm		Lindenwood	W 83–63	15–5 (6–4)	William L. White Auditorium (1,476); Emporia, Kansas
February 2, 2019; 1:30 pm		Lincoln (MO)	W 92–62	16–5 (7–4)	William L. White Auditorium (1,392); Emporia, Kansas
February 7, 2019; 5:30 pm		at Southwest Baptist	W 80–77	17–5 (8–4)	Meyer Sports and Wellness Center; Bolivar, Missouri
February 9, 2019; 1:30 pm		at No. 21 Central Missouri	W 65–62	18–5 (9–4)	UCM Multipurpose Building (2,000); Warrensburg, Missouri
February 14, 2019; 5:30 pm		Central Oklahoma	W 71–64	19–5 (10–4)	William L. White Auditorium (1,248); Emporia, Kansas
February 16, 2019; 1:30 pm		Northeastern State	W 66–60	20–5 (11–4)	William L. White Auditorium (1,479); Emporia, Kansas
February 21, 2019; 5:30 pm		Pittsburg State	L 76–82	20–6 (10–5)	William L. White Auditorium (1,863); Emporia, Kansas
February 23, 2019; 3:00 pm		Missouri Southern	W 76–56	21–6 (11–5)	William L. White Auditorium (1,689); Emporia, Kansas
February 28, 2019; 5:30 pm		at Northeastern State	W 68–59	22–6 (12–5)	NSU Event Center (767); Tahlequah, Oklahoma
March 2, 2019; 1:30 pm		at Central Oklahoma	L 62–78	22–7 (12–6)	Hamilton Field House (597); Edmond, Oklahoma
2019 MIAA Tournament
March 8, 2019; 6:00 pm		vs. Washburn	L 53–61	22–8	Municipal Auditorium; Kansas City, Missouri
2019 NCAA Central Regional Tournament
March 15, 2019; 2:30 pm		vs. Southwestern Oklahoma State	L 65–71	22–9	Gross Memorial Coliseum; Hays, Kansas
*Non-conference game. ^{#}Rankings from WBCA/USA Today Coaches Poll. (#) Tournament seedings in parentheses. All times are in CST.
