= 2017–18 Emporia State Lady Hornets basketball team =

Intercollegiate basketball season

2017–18 Emporia State Lady Hornets basketball
- Conference: Mid-America Intercollegiate Athletics Association
- Record: 17–11 (11–8 MIAA)
- Head coach: Jory Collins (8th season)
- Assistant coaches: Kiel Unruh; Brooke Costley (GA); Marissa Preston (GA)
- Home arena: William L. White Auditorium

The 2017–18 Emporia State Lady Hornets basketball team represented Emporia State University in the 2017–18 NCAA Division II women's basketball season, which was the 44th Lady Hornets basketball season. The Lady Hornets were led by eighth-year head coach Jory Collins. The team played their home games on Slaymaker Court at William L. White Auditorium in Emporia, Kansas, the home court since 1974. Emporia State was a member of the Mid-America Intercollegiate Athletics Association.

== Preseason outlook ==
The Lady Hornets enter the 2017–18 season after finishing with a 29–5 overall, 15–4 in conference play last season under Collins. In the previous season, the Lady Hornets finished tied for second in regular conference play, won the MIAA Basketball Tournament for the fifth consecutive year, and advanced to their sixth straight NCAA Sweet 16, which they lost to Harding Bison.

The Lady Hornets were chosen to finish third in the MIAA Preseason Coaches Poll. On October 31, 2017, the Women's Basketball Coaches Association released their preseason poll with Emporia State as the eleventh ranked team.

== 2017–18 Roster ==
2017–18 Emporia State Hornets women's basketball team
Players
Coaches

Pos.	#	Name	Height	Year	Previous school	Hometown
G	10	Kali Martin	5 ft 8 in (1.73 m)	Fr	Circle HS	El Dorado, Kansas
F	12	Morgan Laudan	5 ft 10 in (1.78 m)	So	Paola HS	Paola, Kansas
G	13	Brittany Kramer	5 ft 9 in (1.75 m)	RS Jr	Marais des Cygnes Valley HS/Hesston College	Melvern, Kansas
F/C	20	Tiana Moala	6 ft 3 in (1.91 m)	Jr	Paola HS	Paola, Kansas
G	21	Jessica Wayne	5 ft 9 in (1.75 m)	So	Piper HS	Kansas City, Kansas
G	22	Jacee Kramer	5 ft 9 in (1.75 m)	Sr	Jefferson County North HS	Winchester, Kansas
G	24	Addie Lackey (injured)	5 ft 9 in (1.75 m)	Sr	Hillsboro HS	Hillsboro, Kansas
F	25	Madison Ralston	6 ft 0 in (1.83 m)	Fr	Argyle HS	Argyle, Texas
F	30	Daley Handy	6 ft 0 in (1.83 m)	So	Maize HS	Wichita, Kansas
F	31	Tatum Graves	6 ft 2 in (1.88 m)	Jr	Shawnee Mission Northwest HS	Shawnee, Kansas
G/F	33	Kyrstie Miller (injured)	5 ft 10 in (1.78 m)	Sr	Holton HS	Holton, Kansas
F	35	Tyra Jones	6 ft 0 in (1.83 m)	Jr	Cody HS/Duquesne University/Labette CC	Detroit, Michigan
G/F	44	Emily Miller	5 ft 10 in (1.78 m)	Jr	Hickman HS/Drury University	Columbia, Missouri

Head coach

Jory Collins

Assistant coach(es)

Kiel Unruh
Brooke Costley (GA)
Marissa Preston (GA)

Legend

- (C) Team captain
- (S) Suspended
- (I) Ineligible
- (W) Walk-on
- Injured
- Current redshirt

Roster
Last update: October 29, 2017

== Media ==
The Lady Hornets basketball games are broadcast on KFFX-FM, Mix 104.9.

== Schedule ==
Date time, TV	Rank^{#}	Opponent^{#}	Result	Record	Site city, state
Exhibition
October 29, 2017*; 2:00 pm		at Kansas	L 49–69	–	Allen Fieldhouse (1,632); Lawrence, Kansas
November 3, 2017*; 5:30 pm	No. 11	at Kansas State	W 87–65	–	Bramlage Coliseum (3,470); Manhattan, Kansas
Non-conference regular season
November 10, 2017*; 2:00 pm	No. 11	vs. Southwestern Oklahoma State; MIAA/GAC Challenge	W 88–76	0–1	Leggett & Platt Athletic Center (435); Joplin, Missouri
November 11, 2017*; 1:00 pm	No. 11	vs. Oklahoma Baptist; MIAA/GAC Challenge	W 86–64	1–1	Leggett & Platt Athletic Center (215); Joplin, Missouri
November 14, 2017*; 5:30 pm	No. 11	at Arkansas–Fort Smith	W 63–49	2–1	Stubblefield Center (635); Fort Smith, Arkansas
November 20, 2017*; 7:00 pm	No. 11	at Newman	W 74–66	2–2	Fugate Gymnasium (927); Wichita, Kansas
November 25, 2017*; 1:30 pm	No. 22	Texas Woman's	W 88–81	3–2	William L. White Auditorium (1,012); Emporia, Kansas
November 29, 2017*; 7:00 pm		Oklahoma Christian	W 107–88	4–2	William L. White Auditorium (1,605); Emporia, Kansas
MIAA regular season
December 7, 2017; 5:30 pm		Nebraska–Kearney	W 85–64	5–2 (1–0)	William L. White Auditorium (1,714); Emporia, Kansas
December 9, 2017; 1:30 pm		Fort Hays State	W 73–70	6–2 (2–0)	William L. White Auditorium (1,686); Emporia, Kansas
December 16, 2017; 1:30 pm		at Lincoln	W 72–50	7–2 (3–0)	Jason Gymnasium (377); Jefferson City, Missouri
December 18, 2017; 5:30 pm		at Lindenwood	L 72–93	7–3 (3–1)	Robert F. Hyland Performance Arena (421); Saint Charles, Missouri
December 30, 2017*; 1:00 pm		Pittsburg State	W 82–75	8–3 (3–1)	William L. White Auditorium (2,214); Emporia, Kansas
January 6, 2018; 5:30 pm		at Washburn; Turnpike Tussle	W 70–62	9–3 (4–1)	Lee Arena (2,981); Topeka, Kansas
January 10, 2018; 5:30 pm		Central Oklahoma	W 61–53	10–3 (5–1)	William L. White Auditorium (1,863); Emporia, Kansas
January 13, 2018; 1:30 pm		Northeastern State	W 88–66	11–3 (6–1)	William L. White Auditorium (1,753); Emporia, Kansas
January 17, 2018; 5:30 pm		at Pittsburg State	W 78–66	12–3 (7–1)	John Lance Arena (1,180); Pittsburg, Kansas
January 20, 2018; 1:30 pm		at Missouri Southern	W 62–55	12–4 (7–2)	Leggett & Platt Athletic Center (1,135); Joplin, Missouri
January 24, 2018; 5:30 pm		No. 7 Central Missouri	W 78–61	12–5 (7–3)	William L. White Auditorium (1,972); Emporia, Kansas
January 28, 2018; 1:30 pm		Southwest Baptist	W 81–67	13–5 (8–3)	William L. White Auditroim (1,996); Emporia, Kansas
January 31, 2018; 5:30 pm		at Fort Hays State	W 90–63	13–6 (8–4)	Gross Memorial Coliseum (2,187); Hays, Kansas
February 3, 2018; 1:30 pm		at Nebraska–Kearney	L 84–91	13–7 (8–5)	Health and Sports Center (2,139); Kearney, Nebraska
February 7, 2018; 5:30 pm		Northwest Missouri State	W 76–62	14–7 (9–5)	William L. White Auditorium (1,587); Emporia, Kansas
February 10, 2018; 5:00 pm		Missouri Western	W 60–40	15–7 (10–5)	William L. White Auditorium (1,776); Emporia, Kansas
February 13, 2018; 5:30 pm		Washburn; Turnpike Tussle	W 74–59	15–8 (10–6)	William L. White Auditorium (2,612); Emporia, Kansas
February 15, 2018; 5:30 pm		at Southwest Baptist	W 77–63	16–8 (11–6)	Myer Wellness & Sports Center (525); Bolivar, Missouri
February 22, 2018; 5:30 pm		at Northeastern State	W 75–67	16–9 (11–7)	NSU Arena; Tahlequah, Oklahoma
February 24, 2018; 1:30 pm		at Central Oklahoma	W 87–86	16–10 (11–8)	Hamilton Field House (874); Edmond, Oklahoma
2018 MIAA Tournament
February 26, 2018; 7:00		vs. Northeastern State	W 72–62	17–10	William L. White Auditorium (1,044); Emporia, Kansas
March 1, 2018		vs. Fort Hays State	W 57–54	17–11	Municipal Auditorium; Kansas City, Missouri
*Non-conference game. ^{#}Rankings from WBCA/USA Today Coaches Poll. (#) Tournament seedings in parentheses. All times are in CST.

== Rankings ==
+ Regular season polls	Poll	Pre- season	Week 2	Week 3	Week 4	Week 5	Week 6	Week 7	Week 8	Week 9	Week 10	Week 11	Week 12	Week 13	Week 14	Week 15	Week 16	Week 17	Final
Coaches	11	22	–	–	–	–	–	–	–	–	–	–	–	–	–	–	–	–	

Legend
	Increase in ranking
	Decrease in ranking
	No change
(RV)	Received votes
(NR)	Not ranked
