= 2014–15 Emporia State Lady Hornets basketball team =

Intercollegiate basketball season

2014–15 Emporia State Lady Hornets basketball

NCAA Central Regional Champions MIAA tournament champions

NCAA Tournament, Final Four
- Conference: Mid-America Intercollegiate Athletics Association

Ranking
- Coaches: No. 4
- Record: 29–5 (15–4 MIAA)
- Head coach: Jory Collins (5th season)
- Assistant coaches: Brian McIntosh; Laura Patrick (GA)
- Home arena: William L. White Auditorium

The 2014–15 Emporia State Lady Hornets basketball team represented Emporia State University in the 2014–15 NCAA Division II women's basketball season, which was the Lady Hornets' 41st basketball season. The Lady Hornets were led by head coach Jory Collins, who finished his fifth season at the helm of the Lady Hornets. The team played its home games on Slaymaker Court at William L. White Auditorium in Emporia, Kansas, its home court since 1974. Emporia State is a member of the Mid-America Intercollegiate Athletics Association.

== Preseason outlook ==
On October 22, the MIAA released its Preseason Coaches Poll. On November 6, the Lady Hornets were ranked 7th in the nation. The Lady Hornets have finished in the top three of the MIAA or have advanced to the MIAA tournament championship game in each of the last 12 years and 16 of the last 17 years. On November 18, the Lady Hornets were picked No. 1 in the Central Region in the inaugural NCAA Division II Women's Basketball DII SIDA Regional Poll.

== 2014–15 Roster ==
2014–15 Emporia State Hornets women's basketball team
Players
Coaches

Pos.	#	Name	Height	Year	Previous school	Hometown
G	2	Kelly Moten	5 ft 8 in (1.73 m)	RS So	Roosevelt	Gary, Ind.
G	3	Brooke Costley (redshirt)	5 ft 6 in (1.68 m)	RS So	Mexico	Mexico, Mo.
G	4	Kelsey Barnwell	5 ft 7 in (1.7 m)	Jr	Kansas HS/UMKC	Kansas, Okla.
F	5	Whitney Gordan	6 ft 2 in (1.88 m)	Jr	Marion HS/Univ. of Wyoming	Marion, Kan.
G	14	Megan Holloway	5 ft 9 in (1.75 m)	So	Salina	Salina, Kan.
F	20	Ashton Bruner	5 ft 11 in (1.8 m)	Jr	McPherson/Barton CC	McPherson, Kan.
G	22	Jacee Kramer	5 ft 8 in (1.73 m)	Fr	Jefferson County North	Winchester, Kan.
G	24	Addie Lackey	5 ft 9 in (1.75 m)	Fr	Hillsboro	Hillsboro, Kan.
F	30	Kathryn Flott	6 ft 1 in (1.85 m)	RS So	Olpe	Olpe, Kan.
G/F	33	Kyrstie Miller	5 ft 10 in (1.78 m)	Fr	Holton	Holton, Kan.
F	35	Merissa Quick	6 ft 3 in (1.91 m)	Sr	Cheney	Cheney, Kan.
F	45	Amber Vandiver (injured)	6 ft 2 in (1.88 m)	Sr	Capital HS/Boise St.	Westminster, Col.

Head coach

Jory Collins

Assistant coach(es)

Brian McIntosh
Laura Patrick (GA)

Legend

- (C) Team captain
- (S) Suspended
- (I) Ineligible
- (W) Walk-on
- Injured
- Current redshirt

Roster
Last update: 2014-11-03

== Media ==
The Lady Hornets basketball games were broadcast on KFFX-FM, Mix 104.9.

== Schedule ==
Date time, TV	Rank^{#}	Opponent^{#}	Result	Record	Site city, state
Exhibition
11/03/2014*; 7:00 pm, Cox Kansas	No. 7	at Kansas State	L 50–54	0–1	Bramlage Coliseum; Manhattan, KS
11/06/2014*; 6:00 pm	No. 7	Evangel	W 73–41	1–1	White Auditorium; Emporia, KS
Regular season
11/14/2014*; 5:00 pm	No. 7	Texas Woman's	W 76–61	1–0	D.L. Ligon Coliseum; Wichita Falls, TX
11/15/2014*; 7:00 pm	No. 7	at Midwestern State	W 62–51	2–0	D.L. Ligon Coliseum; Wichita Falls, TX
11/22/2014*; 7:00 pm	No. 7	Southwestern College (KS)	W 91–40	3–0	White Auditorium; Emporia, KS
11/25/2014*; 7:00 pm	No. 2	Henderson State	W 93–53	4–0	White Auditorium; Emporia, KS
11/29/2014*; 3:30 pm	No. 2	Southwestern Oklahoma State	W 63–56	5–0	White Auditorium; Emporia, KS
12/03/2014; 5:30 pm	No. 1	Northwest Missouri State	W 80–44	6–0 (1–0)	White Auditorium; Emporia, KS
12/06/2014*; 5:30 pm	No. 1	Newman (Kansas)	W 85–49	7–0 (1–0)	White Auditorium; Emporia, KS
12/13/2014; 1:30 pm	No. 1	at Southwest Baptist	W 74–63	8–0 (2–0)	Meyer Sports Center; Bolivar, MO
12/17/2014*; 6:00 pm	No. 1	at Southern Arkansas	W 85–42	9–0 (2–0)	W.T. Watson Athletic Center; Magnolia, AR
12/20/2014; 12:00 pm	No. 1	at No. 22 Missouri Southern	W 75–53	10–0 (3–0)	Leggett & Platt Athletic Center; Joplin, MO
01/03/2015; 1:30 pm	No. 1	Lincoln (MO)	W 99–57	11–0 (4–0)	White Auditorium; Emporia, KS
01/05/2015; 5:30 pm	No. 1	Lindenwood	W 97–52	12–0 (5–0)	White Auditorium; Emporia, KS
01/08/2015; 5:30 pm	No. 1	at Missouri Western	W 57–56	13–0 (6–0)	MWSU Fieldhouse; St. Joseph, MO
01/10/2015; 1:30 pm	No. 1	at Central Missouri	L 61–62	13–1 (6–1)	UCM Multipurpose Building; Warrensburg, MO
01/14/2015; 5:30 pm	No. 3	at No. 2 Pittsburg State	W 65–61 ^{OT}	14–1 (7–1)	John Lance Arena; Pittsburg, KS
01/21/2015; 5:30 pm	No. 2	at Northeastern State	W 69–36	15–1 (8–1)	NSU Event Center; Tahlequah, OK
01/24/2015; 1:30 pm	No. 2	at Central Oklahoma	W 63–53	16–1 (9–1)	Hamilton Field House; Edmond, OK
01/28/2015; 5:30 pm	No. 2	No. 6 Fort Hays State	L 55–65	16–2 (9–2)	White Auditorium; Emporia, KS
02/01/2015; 1:00 pm	No. 2	Nebraska–Kearney	W 80–49	17–2 (10–2)	White Auditorium; Emporia, KS
02/04/2015; 5:30 pm	No. 6	Washburn; Turnpike Tussle	W 62–55	18–2 (11–2)	White Auditorium; Emporia, KS
02/07/2015; 2:00 pm	No. 6	at No. 3 Fort Hays State	L 62–72	18–3 (11–3)	Gross Memorial Coliseum; Hays, KS
02/12/2015; 5:30 pm	No. 9	Northeastern State	L 56–58 ^{OT}	18–4 (11–4)	White Auditorium; Emporia, KS
02/14/2015; 1:30 pm	No. 9	Central Oklahoma	W 80–67	19–4 (12–4)	White Auditorium; Emporia, KS
02/19/2015; 5:30 pm	No. 13	at Nebraska–Kearney	W 73–57	20–4 (13–4)	Health and Sports Center; Kearney, NE
02/21/2015; 5:00 pm	No. 13	at Washburn; Turnpike Tussle	W 73–54	21–4 (14–4)	Lee Arena; Topeka, KS
02/25/2015; 5:30 pm	No. 12	No. 11 Pittsburg State	W 62–58	22–4 (15–4)	White Auditorium; Emporia, KS
2015 MIAA Tournament
03/06/2015; 6:00 pm	No. 10	vs. Missouri Western	W 77–60	23–4	Municipal Auditorium; Kansas City, MO
03/07/2015; 8:15 pm	No. 10	No. 13 Pittsburg State	W 67–53	24–4	Municipal Auditorium; Kansas City, MO
03/08/2015; 3:30 pm	No. 10	No. 4 Fort Hays State	W 49–46	25–4	Municipal Auditorium; Kansas City, MO
2015 NCAA Tournament
03/13/2015*; 2:30 pm	No. 9	Arkansas Tech; Central Regional First round	W 68–51	26–4	Gross Memorial Coliseum; Hays, KS
03/14/2015*; 5:00 pm	No. 9	No. 16 Pittsburg State; Central Regional semifinals	W 65–54 ^{OT}	27–4	Gross Memorial Coliseum; Hays, KS
03/16/2015*; 7:00 pm	No. 9	No. 6 Fort Hays State; Central Regional final	W 66–61	28–4	Gross Memorial Coliseum; Hays, KS
03/24/2015*; 2:30 pm	No. 9	No. 5 West Texas A&M; Elite 8	W 62–50	29–4	Sanford Pentagon; Sioux Falls, SD
03/25/2015*; 6:00 pm, CBS Sports Network	No. 9	No. 14 California (Pa.); Final Four	L 46–51	29–5	Sanford Pentagon; Sioux Falls, SD
*Non-conference game. ^{#}Rankings from WBCA/USA Today Coaches Poll. (#) Tournament seedings in parentheses. All times are in CST.

== Rankings ==
Regular season Polls
Poll	Pre- Season	Week 2	Week 3	Week 4	Week 5	Week 6	Week 7	Week 8	Week 9	Week 10	Week 11	Week 12	Week 13	Week 14	Week 15	Week 16	Week 17	Final
Coaches	7	7	7	2	1	1	1	1	3	2	2	6	9	13	12	10	9	4

Legend
	Increase in ranking
	Decrease in ranking
	No change
(RV)	Received votes
(NR)	Not ranked
