= 2016–17 Emporia State Lady Hornets basketball team =

Intercollegiate basketball season

2016–17 Emporia State Lady Hornets basketball

MIAA Tournament

NCAA Sweet 16, L, 56–58
- Conference: Mid-America Intercollegiate Athletics Association

Ranking
- Coaches: No. 6
- Record: 29–5 (15–4 MIAA)
- Head coach: Jory Collins (7th season)
- Assistant coaches: Kiel Unruh; Dayon Hall (GA)
- Home arena: William L. White Auditorium

The 2016–17 Emporia State Lady Hornets basketball team represented Emporia State University in the 2016–17 NCAA Division II women's basketball season, which was the 43rd Lady Hornets basketball season. The Lady Hornets were led by 7th-year head coach, Jory Collins. The team played their home games on Slaymaker Court at William L. White Auditorium in Emporia, Kansas, the home court since 1974. Emporia State was a member of the Mid-America Intercollegiate Athletics Association.

== Preseason outlook ==
The Lady Hornets entered the 2016–17 season after finishing with a 28–5 overall, 17–5 in conference play last season under Collins. In the previous season, the Lady Hornets finished third in regular conference play, won the MIAA Basketball Tournament for the fourth consecutive year, and advanced to their fifth straight NCAA Sweet 16, which they lost to in-state rival, Pittsburg State.

The Lady Hornets were chosen as the favorite to win in the MIAA Preseason Coaches Poll. On November 1, 2016, the Women's Basketball Coaches Association released their preseason poll with Emporia State as the fourth ranked team.

== 2016–17 Roster ==
2016–17 Emporia State Hornets women's basketball team
Players
Coaches

Pos.	#	Name	Height	Year	Previous school	Hometown
G	2	Kelly Moten	5 ft 9 in (1.75 m)	RS Sr	Roosevelt HS	Gary, Indiana
G	3	Maria Moylan	5 ft 6 in (1.68 m)	So	St. Marys HS	St. Marys, Kansas
F	12	Morgan Laudan	5 ft 10 in (1.78 m)	Fr	Paola HS	Paola, Kansas
G	13	Brittany Kramer	5 ft 9 in (1.75 m)	RS So	Marais des Cygnes Valley HS	Melvern, Kansas
G	14	Megan Holloway	5 ft 9 in (1.75 m)	Sr	Salina South HS	Salina, Kansas
F/C	20	Tiana Moala	6 ft 3 in (1.91 m)	So	Paola HS	Paola, Kansas
F	21	Jessica Wayne	5 ft 9 in (1.75 m)	Fr	Piper HS	Kansas City, Kansas
G	22	Jacee Kramer	5 ft 9 in (1.75 m)	Jr	Jefferson County North HS	Winchester, Kansas
F	23	Shelby Baker	6 ft 1 in (1.85 m)	So	Spring Hill HS	Spring Hill, Kansas
G	24	Addie Lackey	5 ft 9 in (1.75 m)	Jr	Hillsboro HS	Hillsboro, Kansas
F	30	Kathryn Flott	6 ft 1 in (1.85 m)	RS Sr	Olpe HS	Olpe, Kansas
F	31	Tatum Graves	6 ft 2 in (1.88 m)	So	Shawnee Mission NW HS	Shawnee, Kansas
G/F	33	Kyrstie Miller	5 ft 10 in (1.78 m)	Jr	Holton HS	Holton, Kansas

Head coach

Jory Collins

Assistant coach(es)

Kiel Unruh
Dayon Hall (GA)

Legend

- (C) Team captain
- (S) Suspended
- (I) Ineligible
- (W) Walk-on
- Injured
- Current redshirt

Roster
Last update: November 1, 2016

== Media ==
The Lady Hornets basketball games are broadcast on KFFX-FM, Mix 104.9.

== Schedule ==
Date time, TV	Rank^{#}	Opponent^{#}	Result	Record	Site city, state
Exhibition
January 11, 2016*; 7:00 pm	No. 4	at No. 4 Baylor	L 60–89	–	Ferrell Center (5,165); Waco, TX
Non-conference regular season
December 11, 2016*; 7:30 pm	No. 4	Southwestern Oklahoma State; MIAA/GAC Challenge	W 87–65	1–0	William L. White Auditorium (1,623); Emporia, KS
November 13, 2016*; 4:00 om	No. 4	Oklahoma Baptist; MIAA/GAC Challenge	W 102–50	2–0	William L. White Auditorium (1,233); Emporia, KS
November 15, 2016*; 7:00 pm	No. 4	Tabor	W 108–42	3–0	William L. White Auditorium (1,063); Emporia, KS
November 19, 2016*; 5:30 pm	No. 4	Kansas Christian College	W 122–40	4–0	William L. White Auditroium (1,213); Emporia, KS
November 25, 2016*; 7:45 pm	No. 2	at Truman; Drury Thanksgiving Classic	W 89–68	5–0	O'Reilly Family Event Center (141); Springfield, MO
November 26, 2016*; 7:00 pm	No. 2	at No. 18 Drury; Drury Thanksgiving Classic	W 74–59	6–0	O'Reilly Family Event Center (1,318); Springfield, MO
November 30, 2016*; 7:00 pm	No. 1	Arkansas–Fort Smith	W 112–60	7–0	William L. White Auditorium (1,287); Emporia, KS
March 12, 2016*; 1:00 pm	No. 1	Lubbock Christian	W 60–50	8–0	William L. White Auditorium (2,033); Emporia, KS
MIAA regular season
August 12, 2016; 5:30 pm	No. 1	at Nebraska–Kearney	W 75–50	9–0 (1–0)	Health and Sports Center (1,572); Kearney, NE
October 12, 2016; 2:00 pm	No. 1	at Fort Hays State	L 51–54	9–1 (1–1)	Gross Memorial Coliseum (2,931); Hays, KS
December 17, 2016; 5:30 pm	No. 5	Lincoln	W 85–59	10–1 (2–1)	William L. White Auditorium (572); Emporia, KS
December 19, 2016; 5:30 pm	No. 5	Lindenwood	W 85–51	11–1 (3–1)	William L. White Auditorium (1,723); Emporia, KS
December 31, 2016*; 1:00 pm	No. 5	at No. 3 Pittsburg State	W 78–70	12–1 (3–1)	John Lance Arena (2,208); Pittsburg, KS
July 1, 2017; 5:30 pm	No. 2	Washburn; Turnpike Tussle	W 75–49	13–1 (4–1)	William L. White Auditorium (3,102); Emporia, KS
December 1, 2017; 5:30 pm	No. 2	at No. 16 Central Oklahoma	L 64–70	13–2 (4–2)	Hamilton Field House (441); Edmond, OK
January 14, 2017; 1:30 pm	No. 2	at Northeastern State	W 71–51	14–2 (5–2)	NSU Event Center (696); Tahlequah, OK
January 18, 2017; 5:30 pm	No. 9	No. 3 Pittsburg State	W 77–67	15–2 (6–2)	William L. White Auditorium (2,863); Emporia, KS
January 22, 2017; 3:00 pm	No. 9	Missouri Southern	W 74–65	16–2 (7–2)	William L. White Auditorium (2,154); Emporia, KS
January 25, 2017; 5:30 pm	No. 7	at No. 19 Central Missouri	L 56–61 ^{OT}	16–3 (7–3)	UCM Multipurpose Building (1,200); Warrensburg, MO
January 28, 2017; 5:30 pm	No. 7	at Southwest Baptist	W 84–77	17–3 (8–3)	Myer Wellness & Sports Center (1,079); Bolivar, MO
January 2, 2017; 5:30 pm	No. 12	Fort Hays State	W 59–38	18–3 (9–3)	William L. White Auditorium (2,124); Emporia, KS
April 2, 2017; 1:30 pm	No. 12	Nebraska–Kearney	W 81–67	19–3 (10–3)	William L. White Auditorium (2,022); Emporia, KS
August 2, 2017; 5:30 pm	No. 11	at Northwest Missouri State	W 86–48	20–3 (11–3)	Bearcat Arena (935); Maryville, MO
November 2, 2017; 1:30 pm	No. 11	at Missouri Western	L 59–68	20–4 (11–4)	MWSU Fieldhouse (1,171); St. Joseph, MO
February 14, 2017; 5:30 pm	No. 13	at Washburn; Turnpike Tussle	W 73–61	21–4 (12–4)	Lee Arena (1,822); Topeka, KS
February 16, 2017; 5:30 pm	No. 13	Southwest Baptist	W 84–67	22–4 (13–4)	William L. White Auditorium (1,330); Emporia, KS
February 23, 2017; 5:30 pm	No. 13	Northeastern State	W 98–52	23–4 (14–4)	William L. White Auditorium (1,863); Emporia, KS
February 25, 2017; 1:30 pm	No. 13	No. 24 Central Oklahoma	W 76–60	24–4 (15–4)	William L. White Auditorium (2,956); Emporia, KS
2017 MIAA Tournament
March 3, 2017; Noon	No. 3	vs. No. 6 Fort Hays State	W 78–62	25–4	Municipal Auditorium; Kansas City, MO
April 3, 2017; 6:00 pm	No. 3	vs. No. 2 Central Missouri	W 58–50	26–4	Municipal Auditorium; Kansas City, MO
May 3, 2017; 3:30 pm	No. 3	vs. No. 5 Central Oklahoma; MIAA Tournament Championship Game	W 62–54	27–4	Municipal Auditorium; Kansas City, MO
2017 NCAA Tournament
March 10, 2017*; Noon	No. 6	Northern State; NCAA Division II Central Regional Tournament	W 71–68	28–4	Rhodes Field House (602); Searcy, Arkansas
March 11, 2017*; 5 pm	No. 6	No. 11 Pittsburg State; NCAA Division II Central Regional Quarterfinals	W 65–57	29–4	Rhodes Field House (802); Searcy, Arkansas
March 13, 2017*; 7 pm	No. 6	No. 10 Harding; NCAA Division II Central Regional Championship	L 56–58	29–5	Rhodes Field House; Searcy, Arkansas
*Non-conference game. ^{#}Rankings from WBCA/USA Today Coaches Poll. (#) Tournament seedings in parentheses. All times are in CST.

== Rankings ==
+ Regular season polls	Poll	Pre- Season	Week 2	Week 3	Week 4	Week 5	Week 6	Week 7	Week 8	Week 9	Week 10	Week 11	Week 12	Week 13	Week 14	Week 15	Week 16	Week 17	Final
Coaches	4	2	1	5	5	2	2	9	7	12	11	13	13	8	6				

Legend
	Increase in ranking
	Decrease in ranking
	No change
(RV)	Received votes
(NR)	Not ranked
