= MIAA women's basketball tournament =

Mid-America Intercollegiate Athletics Association women's basketball tournament
- Conference basketball championship
- Sport: Basketball
- Conference: Mid-America Intercollegiate Athletics Association
- Format: Single-elimination tournament
- Played: 1983–present
- Current champion: Washburn (10th)
- Most championships: Washburn (10)
- Official website: MIAA women's basketball

The Mid-America Intercollegiate Athletics Association women's basketball tournament (formerly Missouri Intercollegiate Athletics Association women's basketball tournament) is the annual conference women's basketball championship tournament for the Mid-America Intercollegiate Athletics Association. The tournament has been held annually since 1983. It is a single-elimination tournament and seeding is based on regular season records.

The winner receives the MIAA's automatic bid to the NCAA Division II women's basketball tournament.

Washburn have been the most successful team at the MIAA tournament, with ten championships.

== History ==
MIAA women's basketball tournament
Year	Champions	Score	Runner-up	Venue
Missouri Intercollegiate Athletics Association
1983	Central Missouri State (1)	91–69	Northwest Missouri State	UCM Multipurpose Building (Warrensburg, MO)
1984	Central Missouri State (2)	88–65	Southeast Missouri State	UCM Multipurpose Building (Warrensburg, MO)
1985	Central Missouri State (3)	72–67	Southeast Missouri State	UCM Multipurpose Building (Warrensburg, MO)
1986	Central Missouri State (4)	77–69	Southeast Missouri State	Houck Field House (Cape Girardeau, MO)
1987	Southeast Missouri State (1)	78–55	Central Missouri State	Houck Field House (Cape Girardeau, MO)
1988	Central Missouri State (5)	80–68	Southeast Missouri State	Show Me Center (Cape Girardeau, MO)
1989	Central Missouri State (6)	68–64	Southeast Missouri State	UCM Multipurpose Building (Warrensburg, MO)
Mid-America Intercollegiate Athletics Association
1990	Central Missouri State (7)	72–60	Southeast Missouri State	UCM Multipurpose Building (Warrensburg, MO)
1991	Southeast Missouri State (2)	85–83	Central Missouri State	UCM Multipurpose Building (Warrensburg, MO)
1992	Washburn (1)	54–46	Pittsburg State	John Lance Arena (Pittsburg, KS)
1993	Washburn (2)	78–65	Missouri Southern	Lee Arena (Topeka, KS)
1994	Missouri Southern State (1)	81–79	Missouri Western	MWSU Fieldhouse (St. Joseph, MO)
1995	Missouri Western State (1)	76–62	Washburn	MWSU Fieldhouse (St. Joseph, MO)
1996	Missouri Southern State (2)	68–61	Southwest Baptist	Meyer Center (Bolivar, MO)
1997	Missouri Western State (2)	53–46	Central Missouri State	MWSU Fieldhouse (St. Joseph, MO)
1998	Emporia State (1)	91–80	Missouri Western State	William L. White Auditorium (Emporia, KS)
1999	Emporia State (2)	84–74	Missouri Western State	William L. White Auditorium (Emporia, KS)
2000	Emporia State (3)	88–76	Missouri Western State	William L. White Auditorium (Emporia, KS)
2001	Emporia State (4)	78–52	Missouri Western State	William L. White Auditorium (Emporia, KS)
2002	Missouri Western State (3)	54–51	Washburn	MWSU Fieldhouse (St. Joseph, MO)
2003	Washburn (3)	71–60	Missouri Western State	Municipal Auditorium (Kansas City, MO)
2004	Northwest Missouri State (1)	76–62	Emporia State	Municipal Auditorium (Kansas City, MO)
2005	Washburn (4)	63–41	Emporia State	Municipal Auditorium (Kansas City, MO)
2006	Washburn (5)	75–71	Central Missouri State	Municipal Auditorium (Kansas City, MO)
2007	Washburn (6)	71–70	Missouri Western State	Municipal Auditorium (Kansas City, MO)
2008	Northwest Missouri State (2)	82–58	Southwest Baptist	Municipal Auditorium (Kansas City, MO)
2009	Washburn (7)	78–69	Emporia State	Municipal Auditorium (Kansas City, MO)
2010	Washburn (8)	68–56	Central Missouri	Municipal Auditorium (Kansas City, MO)
2011	Northwest Missouri State (3)	79–63	Emporia State	Municipal Auditorium (Kansas City, MO)
2012	Washburn (9)	68–59	Emporia State	Municipal Auditorium (Kansas City, MO)
2013	Emporia State (5)	67–51	Central Missouri	Municipal Auditorium (Kansas City, MO)
2014	Emporia State (6)	75–71	Central Missouri	Municipal Auditorium (Kansas City, MO)
2015	Emporia State (7)	49–46	Fort Hays State	Municipal Auditorium (Kansas City, MO)
2016	Emporia State (8)	80–66	Pittsburg State	Municipal Auditorium (Kansas City, MO)
2017	Emporia State (9)	62–54	Central Oklahoma	Municipal Auditorium (Kansas City, MO)
2018	Lindenwood (1)	58–51	Fort Hays State	Municipal Auditorium (Kansas City, MO)
2019	Fort Hays State (1)	63–56	Central Missouri	Municipal Auditorium (Kansas City, MO)
2020	Central Missouri (8)	82–75	Emporia State	Municipal Auditorium (Kansas City, MO)
2021	Nebraska–Kearney (1)	57–51	Fort Hays State	Gross Memorial Coliseum (Hays, KS)
2022	Fort Hays State (2)	48–42	Missouri Southern State	Memorial Auditorium (Kansas City, MO)
2023	Missouri Southern (3)	78–63	Central Missouri	Memorial Auditorium (Kansas City, MO)
2024	Pittsburg State (1)	63–53	Fort Hays State	Memorial Auditorium (Kansas City, MO)
2025	Pittsburg State (1)	81–73	Fort Hays State	Memorial Auditorium (Kansas City, MO)
2026	Washburn (10)	53–44	Central Missouri	Memorial Auditorium (Kansas City, MO)

== Championship records ==
School	Finals Record	Finals	Years
Washburn	10–2	12	1992, 1993, 2003, 2005, 2006, 2007, 2009, 2010, 2012, 2026
Emporia State	9–6	15	1998, 1999, 2000, 2001, 2013, 2014, 2015, 2016, 2017
Central Missouri (Central Missouri State)	8–10	18	1983, 1984, 1985, 1986, 1988, 1989, 1990, 2020
Northwest Missouri State	3–1	4	2004, 2008, 2011
Missouri Southern (Missouri Southern State)	3–2	5	1994, 1996, 2023
Missouri Western (Missouri Western State)	3–7	10	1995, 1997, 2002
Southeast Missouri State	2–6	8	1987, 1991
Fort Hays State	2–5	7	2019, 2022
Pittsburg State	2–2	4	2024, 2025
Nebraska–Kearney	1–0	1	2021
Lindenwood	1–0	1	2018
Central Oklahoma	0–1	1	
Southwest Baptist	0–2	2	

- Arkansas–Fort Smith, Newman, Northeastern State (OK), and Rogers State have not yet qualified for the MIAA tournament finals
- Lincoln (MO), Missouri–Rolla (Missouri S&T), UMSL, Nebraska–Omaha (Omaha), and Truman (Northeast Missouri State) never won the tournament as MIAA members
- Schools highlighted in pink are former members of the MIAA

== See also ==
- MIAA men's basketball tournament
