= 2009–10 Emporia State Lady Hornets basketball team =

Intercollegiate basketball season

2009–10 Emporia State Lady Hornets basketball

National Champions MIAA tournament champions

NCAA Women's tournament championship game, W 65–53 v. Fort Lewis
- Conference: Mid-America Intercollegiate Athletics Association

Ranking
- Coaches: No. 1
- Record: 30–5 (16–4 MIAA)
- Head coach: Brandon Schneider (12th season)
- Assistant coaches: Jory Collins; Kiel Unruh
- Home arena: William L. White Auditorium

2009–10 Mid-America Intercollegiate Athletics Association women's basketball standings
	Conf.				Overall
Team	W		L	PCT	W		L	PCT
Washburn^{†}	17	–	3	.850	27	–	4	.871
Emporia State^{‡}	16	–	4	.800	30	–	5	.857
Central Missouri	13	–	7	.650	19	–	12	.613
Pittsburg State	12	–	8	.600	14	–	14	.500
Missouri Southern	9	–	11	.450	15	–	3	.833
NW Missouri State	9	–	11	.450	14	–	15	.483
Fort Hays State	8	–	12	.400	15	–	3	.833
Nebraska–Omaha	8	–	13	.381	12	–	15	.444
Southwest Baptist	8	–	12	.400	10	–	18	.357
Truman	6	–	14	.300	11	–	16	.407
Missouri Western	5	–	15	.250	7	–	20	.259
† 2010 MIAA Tournament^{‡} 2010 NCAA National Champions winner As of March 2010

The 2009–10 Emporia State Lady Hornets basketball team represented Emporia State University in the 2009–10 NCAA Division II women's basketball season, which was the team's 36th basketball season. Led by Head Coach Brandon Schneider, who finished his 12th season at Emporia State, the Lady Hornets won the 2010 NCAA Women's Division II Basketball Tournament, claiming the school's first national title in any sport. The team played its home games at William L. White Auditorium in Emporia, Kansas, its home court since 1974. Emporia State is a member of the Mid-America Intercollegiate Athletics Association.

== 2009–10 Roster ==
2009–10 Emporia State Hornets women's basketball team
Players
Coaches

Pos.	#	Name	Height	Year	Previous school	Hometown
G	1	Cassondra Boston	5 ft 6 in (1.68 m)	RS Sr	Hoover	Des Moines, Iowa
G	4	Rachel Hanf	5 ft 9 in (1.75 m)	RS Fr	Paola	Paola, Kan.
F	5	Jocelyn Cummings	5 ft 10 in (1.78 m)	Fr	Shawnee Mission South	Overland Park, Kan.
G	10	Jamie Augustyn	5 ft 6 in (1.68 m)	Sr	Burlington	Burlington, Kan.
G	11	Lacy Corker	5 ft 6 in (1.68 m)	Jr	Bishop Meige	Shawnee, Kan.
G	13	Kelsey Newman	5 ft 8 in (1.73 m)	Fr	Lincoln East	Lincoln, Neb.
G	15	Brittney Miller	5 ft 10 in (1.78 m)	So	Paola	Paola, Kan.
G	20	Sophia Lenard	5 ft 9 in (1.75 m)	Sr	Central Arizona CC	Wilmington, Calif.
F	22	Ashley Ferrell	5 ft 10 in (1.78 m)	RS Jr	Kilgore College	Fort Worth, Texas
C	23	Negesti Taylor	6 ft 2 in (1.88 m)	Jr	Iowa Western CC	Harrisburg, Penn.
G/F	32	Kayla Krueger	5 ft 9 in (1.75 m)	Jr	Olpe	Olpe, Kan.
F	45	Dava Logsdon	5 ft 10 in (1.78 m)	Jr	Newman University	Wichita, Kan.
F	50	Alli Volkens	6 ft 2 in (1.88 m)	Jr	Gladbrook–Reinbeck	Reinbeck, Iowa.

Head coach

Brandon Schneider

Assistant coach(es)

Jory Collins
Kiel Unruh

Legend

- (C) Team captain
- (S) Suspended
- (I) Ineligible
- (W) Walk-on
- Injured
- Current redshirt

Roster
Last update: 2015-06-06

== Media ==
The Lady Hornets basketball games were broadcast on KFFX-FM, Mix 104.9.

== Schedule ==
Date time, TV	Rank^{#}	Opponent^{#}	Result	Record	Site city, state
Exhibition
11/08/2009*		at Kansas	L 48–85	0–1	Allen Fieldhouse; Lawrence, KS
Regular season
11/17/2009*		Bendedictine	W 89–49	1–0	White Auditorium; Emporia, KS
11/20/2009*		Eastern New Mexico; ESU Tip-off Classic	W 82–50	2–0	White Auditorium; Emporia, KS
11/21/2009*		Evangel; ESU Tip-off Classic	W 84–59	23–0	White Auditorium; Emporia, KS
11/27/2009*		at Arkansas–Fort Smith; MSSU Thanksgiving Classic	W 88–43	4–0	Leggett & Platt Athletic Center; Joplin, MO
11/28/2009*		at Avila; MSSU Thanksgiving Classic	W 84–50	5–0	Leggett & Platt Athletic Center; Joplin, MO
12/02/2009		at Northwest Missouri State	L 76–88	5–1 (0–1)	Bearcat Arena; Maryville, MO
12/05/2009		at Missouri Western	W 71–62	6–1 (1–1)	MWSU Fieldhouse; St. Joseph, MO
12/12/2009		Central Missouri	W 72–66	7–1 (2–1)	White Auditorium; Emporia, KS
12/21/2009*		at Cal State East Bay	W 100–61	8–1 (2–1)	Pioneer Gym; Hayward, CA
12/22/2009*		at San Francisco State	W 55–48	9–1 (2–1)	Main Gymnasium; San Francisco, CA
12/28/2009		Truman	W 75–55	10–1 (3–1)	White Auditorium; Emporia, KS
12/31/2009		at Nebraska–Omaha	W 76–42	11–1 (4–1)	Lee & Helene Sapp Fieldhouse; Omaha, NE
01/02/2010		at Southwest Baptist	W 76–54	12–1 (5–1)	Myer Wellness & Sports Center; Bolivar, MO
01/06/2010		at Missouri Southern	W 55–52	13–1 (6–1)	Leggett & Platt Athletic Center; Joplin, MO
01/09/2010		Pittsburg State	W 79–62	14–1 (7–1)	White Auditorium; Emporia, KS
01/16/2010		at Washburn; Turnpike Tussle	W 54–47	15–1 (8–1)	Lee Arena; Topeka, KS
01/20/2010		Fort Hays State	W 88–67	16–1 (9–1)	White Auditorium; Emporia, KS
01/24/2010		Northwest Missouri State	W 91–62	17–1 (10–1)	White Auditorium; Emporia, KS
01/27/2010		Missouri Western	W 110–68	18–1 (11–1)	White Auditorium; Emporia, KS
01/30/2010		at Truman	W 76–60	19–1 (12–1)	Pershing Arena; Kirksville, MO
02/03/2010		at Central Missouri	L 60–64	19–2 (12–2)	UCM Multipurpose Building; Warrensburg, MO
02/06/2010		at Nebraska–Omaha	W 96–78	20–2 (13–2)	White Auditorium; Emporia, KS
02/10/2010		Southwest Baptist	W 103–90 ^{OT}	21–2 (14–2)	White Auditorium; Emporia, KS
02/13/2010		Missouri Southern	W 97–54	22–2 (15–2)	White Auditorium; Emporia, KS
02/17/2010		at Pittsburg State	L 66–71	22–3 (15–3)	John Lance Arena; Pittsburg, KS
02/24/2010		Washburn; Turnpike Tussle	L 51–63	22–4 (15–4)	White Auditorium; Emporia, KS
02/28/20102		at Fort Hays State	W 87–80	23–4 (16–4)	Gross Memorial Coliseum; Hays, KS
2010 MIAA Tournament
03/04/2010		Fort Hays State	W 72–66	24–4	Municipal Auditorium; Kansas City, MO
03/06/2010		Central Missouri	L 74–79	24–5	Municipal Auditorium; Kansas City, MO
2010 NCAA Tournament
03/12/2010*		Tarleton State; Central Regional First round	W 90–71	25–5	First United Bank Center; Canyon, TX
03/13/2010*		West Texas A&M; Central Regional semifinals	W 65–54 ^{OT}	26–5	First United Bank Center; Canyon, TX
03/15/2010*		Northeastern State; Central Regional final	W 76–45	27–5	First United Bank Center; Canyon, TX
03/23/2010*		Michigan Tech; Elite 8	W 62–50	28–5	St. Joseph Civic Arena; St. Joseph, MO
03/24/2010*		Gannon University; Final Four	W 97–94	29–5	St. Joseph Civic Arena; St. Joseph, MO
03/26/2010*		Fort Lewis; National championship game	W 65–53	30–5	St. Joseph Civic Arena; St. Joseph, MO
*Non-conference game. (#) Tournament seedings in parentheses. S=South Central. All times are in CST.
