= 2015–16 Emporia State Lady Hornets basketball team =

Intercollegiate basketball season

2015–16 Emporia State Lady Hornets basketball

MIAA Tournament

NCAA Tournament (Sweet 16), L 74–48
- Conference: Mid-America Intercollegiate Athletics Association

Ranking
- Coaches: No. 16
- Record: 28–6 (17–5 MIAA)
- Head coach: Jory Collins (6th season)
- Assistant coaches: Kiel Unruh; Dayon Hall (GA)
- Home arena: William L. White Auditorium

The 2015–16 Emporia State Lady Hornets basketball team represented Emporia State University in the 2015–16 NCAA Division II women's basketball season, which was the 42nd Lady Hornets basketball season. The Lady Hornets were led by 6th year head coach, Jory Collins. The team played its home games on Slaymaker Court at William L. White Auditorium in Emporia, Kansas, its home court since 1974. Emporia State is a member of the Mid-America Intercollegiate Athletics Association.

== Preseason outlook ==
The Lady Hornets were chosen as the favorite to win in the D-II Bulletin Preseason National Poll that was released on October 5, 2015. The only other MIAA member ranked was Fort Hays State at #5. On October 22, 2015, the MIAA released its Preseason Coaches Poll, with the Lady Hornets tabbed as the favorite to win.

On November 3, 2015, the Women's Basketball Coaches Association released their preseason poll with Emporia State as the top ranked team.

== 2015–16 Roster ==
2015–16 Emporia State Hornets women's basketball team
Players
Coaches

Pos.	#	Name	Height	Year	Previous school	Hometown
G	2	Kelly Moten	5 ft 9 in (1.75 m)	RS Jr	Roosevelt	Gary, Indiana
G	3	Maria Moylan	5 ft 5 in (1.65 m)	Fr	St. Marys HS	St. Marys, Kansas
G	4	Kelsey Barnwell	5 ft 7 in (1.7 m)	Sr	Kansas HS/UMKC	Kansas, Oklahoma
F	5	Sandra Ngoie	6 ft 2 in (1.88 m)	Sr	Georgia Tech/George Mason	Stockholm, Sweden
G	13	Brittany Kramer (redshirt)	5 ft 9 in (1.75 m)	RS So	Marais des Cygnes Valley HS	Melvern, Kansas
G	14	Megan Holloway	5 ft 9 in (1.75 m)	Jr	Salina South HS	Salina, Kansas
F/C	20	Tiana Moala	6 ft 2 in (1.88 m)	Fr	Paola HS	Paola, Kansas
G	22	Jacee Kramer	5 ft 9 in (1.75 m)	So	Jefferson County North HS	Winchester, Kansas
F	23	Shelby Baker	6 ft 2 in (1.88 m)	Fr	Spring Hill HS	Spring Hill, Kansas
G	24	Addie Lackey	5 ft 9 in (1.75 m)	So	Hillsboro HS	Hillsboro, Kansas
F	30	Kathryn Flott	6 ft 1 in (1.85 m)	RS Jr	Olpe HS	Olpe, Kansas
F	31	Tatum Graves	6 ft 2 in (1.88 m)	Fr	Shawnee Mission Northwest HS	Shawnee, Kansas
G/F	33	Kyrstie Miller	5 ft 9 in (1.75 m)	So	Holton HS	Holton, Kansas

Head coach

Jory Collins

Assistant coach(es)

Kiel Unruh
Dayon Hall (GA)

Legend

- (C) Team captain
- (S) Suspended
- (I) Ineligible
- (W) Walk-on
- Injured
- Current redshirt

Roster
Last update: 2015-10-30

== Media ==
The Lady Hornets basketball games are broadcast on KFFX-FM, Mix 104.9.

== Schedule ==
Date time, TV	Rank^{#}	Opponent^{#}	Result	Record	Site city, state
Exhibition
11/08/2015*; 2:00 pm		at Kansas	L 57–68	–	Allen Fieldhouse (2,871); Lawrence, KS
Non-Conference regular season
11/13/2015*; 5:30 pm	No. 1	at Southwestern Oklahoma State; SWOSU Classic	W 72–63	1–0	Rankin Williams Fieldhouse; Weatherford, OK
11/14/2015*; Noon	No. 1	at Oklahoma Baptist; SWOSU Classic	W 80–63	2–0	Rankin Williams Fieldhouse (207); Weatherford, OK
11/17/2015*; 5:30 pm	No. 1	Cameron	W 86–50	3–0	William L. White Auditorium (1,287); Emporia, KS
11/21/2015*; 4:30 pm	No. 1	Science and Arts	W 109–39	4–0	William L. White Auditroium; Emporia, KS
11/26/2015*; 4:00 pm (CT)	No. 1	vs. Hawaii Pacific; Oahu Classic	W 63–53	5–0	McKinley High School (76); Honolulu, HI
11/27/2015*; 1:00 pm (CT)	No. 1	vs. Hawaii–Hilo; Oahu Classic	W 82–53	6–0	McKinley High School (70); Honolulu, HI
MIAA regular season
12/3/2015; 5:30 pm	No. 1	at Nebraska–Kearney	W 73–64	7–0 (1–0)	Health and Sports Center (1,265); Kearney, NE
12/5/2015; 2:00 pm	No. 1	at No. 5 Fort Hays State	L 70–71	7–1 (1–1)	Gross Memorial Coliseum (2,750); Hays, KS
12/12/2015; 3:30 pm	No. 3	Central Missouri	W 71–55	8–1 (2–1)	William L. White Auditorium (2,023); Emporia, KS
12/16/2015; 5:30 pm	No. 3	at Missouri Southern	L 58–71	8–2 (2–2)	Leggett & Platt Athletic Center (1,025); Joplin, MO
12/19/2015; 1:30 pm	No. 3	at Pittsburg State	W 90–69	9–2 (3–2)	John Lance Arena (1,370); Pittsburg, KS
1/2/2016; 1:30 pm	No. 3	Lincoln (MO)	W 101–76	10–2 (4–2)	William L. White Auditorium (1,973); Emporia, KS
1/4/2016; 5:30 pm	No. 3	Lindenwood	W 87–58	11–2 (5–2)	William L. White Auditorium (1,993); Emporia, KS
1/7/2016; 5:30 pm	No. 8	at Central Oklahoma	W 74–63	12–2 (6–2)	Hamilton Field House (301); Edmond, OK
1/9/2016; 1:30 pm	No. 8	at Northeastern State	W 87–58	13–2 (7–2)	NSU Event Center (782); Tahlequah, OK
1/13/2016; 5:30 pm	No. 9	Northwest Missouri St.	W 96–54	14–2 (8–2)	William L. White Auditorium (2,225); Emporia, KS
1/16/2016; 1:30 pm	No. 9	No. 10 Missouri Western	L 64–73	14–3 (8–3)	William L. White Auditorium (2,297); Emporia, KS
1/23/2016; 5:00 pm	No. 12	at Washburn; Turnpike Tussle	W 53–41–	15–3 (9–3)	Lee Arena (2,979); Topeka, KS
1/28/2016; 5:30 pm	No. 11	at Southwest Baptist	W 78–61	16–3 (10–3)	Myer Wellness & Sports Center (479); Bolivar, MO
1/30/2016; 1:30 pm	No. 11	at Central Missouri	L 64–69	16–4 (10–4)	UCM Multipurpose Building (1,800); Warrensburg, MO
2/3/2016; 5:30 pm	No. 16	Missouri Southern	W 71–61	17–4 (11–4)	William L. White Auditorium (2,276); Emporia, KS
2/6/2016; 3:30 pm	No. 16	Pittsburg State	L 66–74	17–5 (11–5)	William L. White Auditorium (2,864); Emporia, KS
2/10/2016; 5:30 pm	No. 21	Southwest Baptist	W 88–72	18–5 (12–5)	William L. White Auditorium (1,722); Emporia, KS
2/13/2016; 1:30 pm	No. 21	at Lincoln (MO)	W 99–45	19–5 (13–5)	Jason Gymnasium (480); Jefferson City, MO
2/18/2016; 5:30 pm	No. 22	Central Oklahoma	W 68–59	20–5 (14–5)	William L. White Auditorium (1,795); Emporia, KS
2/20/2016; 1:30 pm	No. 22	Northeastern State	W 79–46	21–5 (15–5)	William L. White Auditorium (1,863); Emporia, KS
2/24/2016; 5:30 pm	No. 22	at Northwest Missouri St.	W 69–63	22–5 (16–5)	Bearcat Arena (761); Maryville, MO
2/27/2016; 1:30 pm	No. 22	Washburn; Turnpike Tussle	W 98–61	23–5 (17–5)	William L. White Auditorium (2,754); Emporia, KS
2016 MIAA Tournament
03/03/2016; 8:15 pm	No. 20	vs. Central Oklahoma	W 65–54	24–5	Municipal Auditorium; Kansas City, MO
03/05/2016; 2:15 pm	No. 20	vs. No. 7 Missouri Western	W 85–74	25–5	Municipal Auditorium; Kansas City, MO
03/06/2016; 1:00 pm, MIAA Network	No. 20	vs. No. 19 Pittsburg State; MIAA Tournament Championship Game	W 80–66	26–5	Municipal Auditorium; Kansas City, MO
2016 NCAA Tournament
03/11/2015*; 2:30 pm	No. 18	Northern State; Central Regional First Round	W 74–68	27–5	John Lance Arena; Pittsburg, KS
03/12/2015*; 5:00 pm	No. 18	No. 7 Winona State; Central Regional Second Round	W 66–62	28–5	John Lance Arena; Pittsburg, KS
03/12/2015*; 7:00 pm	No. 18	No. 19 Pittsburg State; NCAA Sweet 16	L 74–78	28–6	John Lance Arena; Pittsburg, KS
*Non-conference game. ^{#}Rankings from WBCA/USA Today Coaches Poll. (#) Tournament seedings in parentheses. All times are in CST.

== Rankings ==
+ Regular season polls	Poll	Pre- Season	Week 2	Week 3	Week 4	Week 5	Week 6	Week 7	Week 8	Week 9	Week 10	Week 11	Week 12	Week 13	Week 14	Week 15	Week 16	Week 17	Final
Coaches	1	1	3	3	3	8	9	12	11	11	16	21	22	22	22	20	18	16	

Legend
	Increase in ranking
	Decrease in ranking
	No change
(RV)	Received votes
(NR)	Not ranked
