= Val Schierling =

American basketball coach (born 1946)

Biographical details
- Born: January 31, 1946 (age 80); Sedan, Kansas, U.S.
- Education: Emporia State

Coaching career (HC unless noted)
- 1974–1981: Chaparral HS
- 1981–95: Emporia State (HC)

Head coaching record
- Overall: 212–189 (.529)

Accomplishments and honors

Championships
- 2 CSIC Regular Season & Tournament Championships (1981–82, 1984–85)

Awards
- 2nd All-time winningest women's basketball coach – Emporia State

Val Schierling (born January 31, 1946) is an American former college women's basketball coach. He coached at Emporia State University from 1981 to 1995. Before coaching at his alma mater, Schierling coached the Chaparral High School girls' basketball team for seven years.

== Career ==
=== Playing career ===
Schierling attended Emporia State from 1964–68, competing on the school's track and field team. During his career at Emporia State, Schierling won four Central Intercollegiate Athletic Conference hurdle championships, and set several school records. Schierling was also an NAIA All-American in both 1967 and 1968. Schierling is a member of Emporia State's Athletic Hall of Fame. He won the 400-meter hurdles race at the Canadian Track and Field Championships in 1968.

=== Coaching career ===
In his fourteen seasons at helm of the Lady Hornets program, Schierling had won two Central States Intercollegiate Conference regular season and tournaments and combined a record of 212–189 overall and a 23–41 record in the MIAA. While head coach at Emporia State, the school transitioned from a National Association of Intercollegiate Athletics school to a National Collegiate Athletic Association school. Schierling was also the winningest coach in Emporia State's history up until the 2006–07 season, when Brandon Schneider passed Schierling. In 1995, after four consecutive losing seasons, Schierling was fired.

Record table
Season	Team	Overall	Conference	Standing	Postseason
Val Schierling (Central States Intercollegiate Conference) (1981–1995)
1981–82	Val Schierling	17–10			
1982–83	Val Schierling	16–10			
1983–84	Val Schierling	17–12			
1984–85	Val Schierling	16–3			
1985–86	Val Schierling	15–15			
1986–87	Val Schierling	11–17			
1987–88	Val Schierling	20–9			
1988–89	Val Schierling	11–19			
NCAA Independent
1989–90	Val Schierling	21–9			
1990–91	Val Schierling	23–4			
Mid-America Intercollegiate Athletics Association
1991–92	Val Schierling	14–17	8–8		
1992–93	Val Schierling	10–16	6–10		
1993–94	Val Schierling	10–16	4–12		
1994–95	Val Schierling	11–15	5–11		
Total:		212–189			
National champion Postseason invitational champion Conference regular season champion Conference regular season and conference tournament champion Division regular season champion Division regular season and conference tournament champion Conference tournament champion
