= Jory Collins =

American basketball coach (born 1978)

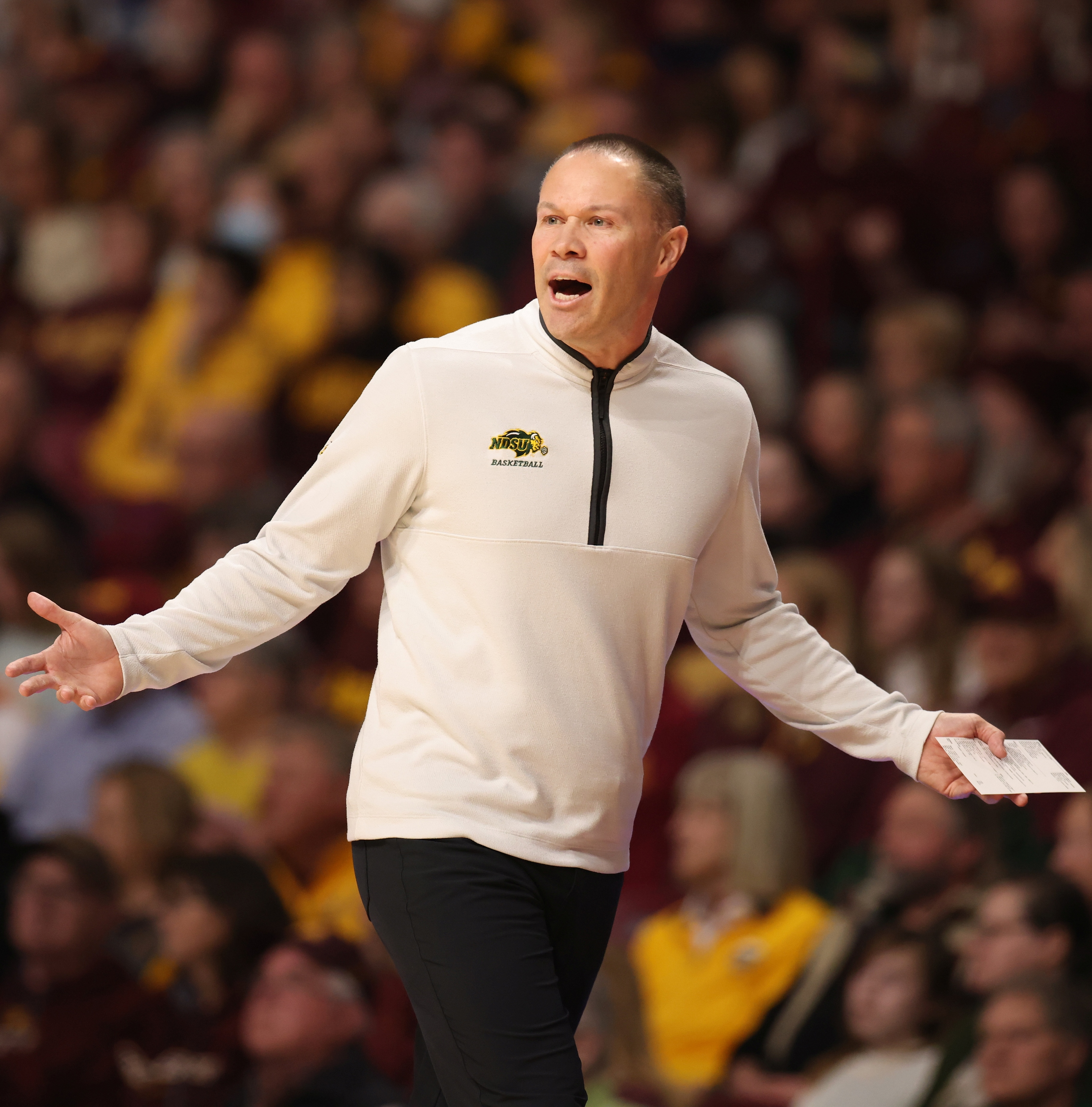
- Collins in 2024

Current position
- Title: Head coach
- Team: North Dakota State
- Conference: Summit League
- Record: 127–87 (.593)
- Annual salary: $164,913

Biographical details
- Born: October 14, 1978 (age 47); Holton, Kansas, U.S.

Coaching career (HC unless noted)
- 2000–2010: Emporia State (assist.)
- 2010–2018: Emporia State
- 2018–2019: Kansas (assist.)
- 2019–present: North Dakota State

Head coaching record
- Overall: 326–145 (.692)
- Tournaments: 34–9 (.791)

Accomplishments and honors

Championships
- 5× MIAA Tournament championships (2013–17); Central Regional championship (2015); Summit League regular season championship (2026)

Awards
- WBCA Region 7 Coach of the Year (2014); KBCA Coach of the Year (2015); Summit League Coach of the Year (2026); Kay Yow Award (2026)

Jory Michael Collins (born October 14, 1978) is an American women's college basketball coach currently serving as the head coach for the North Dakota State program. From 2010 until 2018, he was the head coach at Emporia State University. He led the Emporia State Lady Hornets to eight consecutive winning seasons. Collins is the second winningest coach in Emporia State history with a record of 199–58 (.774).

== Coaching career ==
In April 2010, Collins was selected as the head basketball coach of the Emporia State women's basketball program, following the resignation of then-head coach Brandon Schneider, who had announced that he had accepted a position at Stephen F. Austin. Previously, Collins served as the assistant for Emporia State. Before becoming a full-time assistant for the team, he held several positions with the team, including student assistant and volunteer coach. In the 2004–05 season, he was a graduate assistant, and in 2006 he was promoted to full-time assistant.

=== Emporia State University (2010–2018) ===
During his eight seasons at the helm of the Lady Hornets program, Collins won five consecutive MIAA tournaments from 2013 to 2017, and finished with a combined record of 199–58 overall and a 123–44 record in the MIAA. He is the first coach in Emporia State history to advance to six conference tournament championships and four regional championships in five years.

==== 2010–11 season ====
In his first season, Collins led the Lady Hornets to a 20–9 overall, and 15–7 conference winning season. He led them to the MIAA Tournament title game, which they lost to the Northwest Missouri Bearcats.

==== 2011–12 season ====
The following season, Collins led the Lady Hornets to a 23–9 overall, and 14–6 conference winning season. The Lady Hornets advanced to their second consecutive MIAA Tournament title game, which they lost. They also advanced on to the NCAA Sweet 16, where they lost to the Pittsburg State Gorillas.

==== 2012–13 season ====
In 2012–13, the Lady Hornets were preseason ranked 19 in the WBCA poll. During the 2012–13 season, Collins led the Lady Hornets to an overall record of 23–9, and 13–5 conference winning season. They went on to their third consecutive MIAA tournament title game, which they won against the University of Central Missouri Jennies 67–51. This was their fifth tournament win, and their first since the tournament moved to Kansas City, Missouri in 2003. They again made it to the NCAA Sweet 16, where they lost to the Augustana Vikings 75–74.

==== 2013–14 season ====
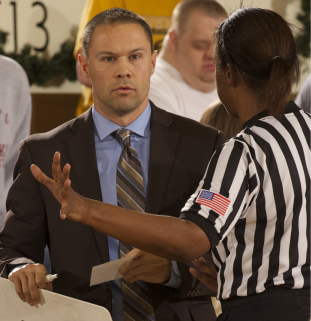
Collins during a game in 2015

In 2013–14, the Lady Hornets were preseason ranked 9 in the Women's Division II Bulletin Preseason Top 10 Rankings poll. During the 2013–14 season, Collins led the Lady Hornets to an overall record of 30–4, and 16–3 conference winning season. For the fourth consecutive season, Collins coached the Lady Hornets to their fourth MIAA tournament title game, which they won against the Central Missouri Jennies. The Lady Hornets went to the NCAA Regionals, which they lost to the Concordia–St. Paul Golden Bears 70–67. At the end of the season in March 2014, Collins was selected as the NCAA Division II Region 7 Russell Athletic/WBCA Coach of the Year.

==== 2014–15 season ====
In 2014–15, the Lady Hornets were preseason ranked 7th in the Women's Division II Bulletin Preseason Top 10 Rankings poll. During the 2014–15 season, Collins led the Lady Hornets to an overall record of 29–5, and 15–4 conference winning season. For the fifth consecutive season, Collins coached the Lady Hornets to their fifth MIAA tournament title game, which they won their third straight game against the Fort Hays State Tigers 49–46. The Lady Hornets went to the NCAA Regionals, where they again beat Fort Hays State in the finals to advance to the Elite Eight. Collins then led the team to the Final Four, where they lost to the California Vulcans. In post-season honors, Collins won the Kansas Basketball Coaches Association "Coach of the Year".

==== 2015–16 season ====
Geing into the 2015–16 season, the Lady Hornets were chosen as the national favorite in both the D-II Bulletin Preseason National Poll and the Women's Basketball Coaches Association poll, as well as the MIAA polls. The first loss of the season came in December against Fort Hays State; the Tigers defeated Emporia State 71–70. The Lady Hornets then lost four more times by 15 or less points. They ended the regular season 23–5 (17–5 in conference play), finishing in fourth place in the MIAA standings. The Lady Hornets competed in the MIAA Conference Tournament in Kansas City, Kansas, where they won their fourth straight conference tournament championship. The Lady Hornets ended the postseason in their fifth straight Sweet 16, losing to conference rival Pittsburg State, and finished with an overall record of 28–6.

==== 2016–17 season ====
After winning their fourth straight conference tournament championship, the Lady Hornets entered the 2016–17 season ranked fourth in the nation and the favorite to win in the MIAA. As was the case in the previous season, their first loss of the season came in December to Fort Hays State; the Tigers defeated the Lady Hornets by three points. The Lady Hornets finished the regular season by losing only three more times and winning most games by 10 or more points, finishing 24–4 overall, 15–4 in conference play, tying for second place in the MIAA. The Lady Hornets won their fifth straight MIAA Conference Tournament Championship, and finished the postseason by losing the Sweet 16 to Harding.

==== 2017–18 season ====
The 2017–18 season brought some challenges to the team. Two of the team's seniors were out with knee and ankle injuries that had occurred prior to the season. Collins led the Lady Hornets to an overall record of 17–11, and 11–8 conference record, ending a five-consecutive MIAA Tournament championship streak and marking the first time the team did not make the NCAA postseason since 2011.

=== North Dakota State (2019–present) ===
On April 29, 2019, Collins was named the next head coach for the North Dakota State Bison women's basketball program after serving one year as a women's assistant basketball coach at the University of Kansas. He took over a struggling NDSU program; their last winning record season was 2009–10.

==== 2019–20 season ====
In the 2019–20 season, Collins led the Bison to an 11–19 overall record and a 7–9 Summit League record. The season did not feature many improvements, but the Bison were able to win their quarterfinal matchup against Denver in the Summit League tournament. They lost in the semifinals against South Dakota State.

==== 2020–21 season ====
Due to the COVID-19 pandemic, the 2020–21 season did not start until December 2. Collins was able to make the most of a weird season, pushing the Bison to finish with a 15–9 overall record and a 9–7 conference record. NDSU finished with a winning record for the first time since 2010. This featured wins over Northern Iowa and Kansas. Yet again, Collins' Bison team was able to beat their quarterfinal opponent in the Summit League tournament; however, this time they were seeded as the three seed, and repeat opponent Denver was the sixth seed. They fell the following day against South Dakota in the semifinals.

==== 2021–22 season ====
After seeing an improvement from his first season to his second, Collins' third season at North Dakota State was a step back. The Bison finished with an 11–18 overall record and a 7–11 Summit League record. Also, unlike the previous two seasons, they failed to win a game in the Summit League tournament.

==== 2022–23 season ====
The 2022–23 season started off on a high note for the Bison, winning their first six games. This season was characterized by real improvement in a standard season. It was highlighted by wins over Minnesota and Boise State, and a season sweep of South Dakota for the first time in several seasons. In the Summit League tournament, the Bison entered as the 2 seed for the first time ever, and played tenth-seeded Kansas City in the quarterfinal. NDSU lost that open round matchup, but got their first taste of postseason play when they received an at-large bid to the 2023 Women's National Invitation Tournament. They fell to Oregon in the first round.

==== 2023–24 season ====
In the 2023–24 season, Collins continued to improve the Bison program, as they experienced more firsts. They swept South Dakota for the second season in a row, and the Bison got the second seed in the Summit League tournament again. However, for the first time in program history, NDSU made it to the tournament championship game against their rivals in South Dakota State. The Bison fell to the Jacks in a mostly close game, but this also led to them receiving another at-large bid to the 2024 Women's National Invitation Tournament. This time, NDSU got a bye in the first round and hosted in the second round. They defeated Montana in that second round home game, winning their first Division I postseason game. They fell in the next round, the Super 16, to Minnesota.

==== 2024–25 season ====
The 2024–25 season was less of an improvement on the previous season, and more a return of the same. Collins led the Bison to an 21–12 record and an 11–5 conference record. North Dakota State fell to Kansas City again in the Summit League tournament. However, they received an at-large bid to the 2025 Women's National Invitation Tournament, for the third year in a row. This time, they hosted all the games they played in the tournament, and they won their second round and Super 16 games to reach their first Great 8 game in the WNIT. Collins' Bison fell to Troy in their Great 8 game, in overtime.

==== 2025–26 season ====
In the 2025–26 season, Collins led North Dakota State to its most successful Division I season yet, and their best season overall since 1995–96. The Bison went go 2–2 in their first four games, before rattling off 23 wins in a row. This included a win over South Dakota State in Brookings, South Dakota for the first time since January 4, 2015, which snapped a 24-game losing streak to the Jacks. South Dakota State was the team to snap the Bison win streak. However, this was enough for the Bison to win their first Summit League regular season title outright. In the Summit League tournament, NDSU ran through their first two opponents in the quarterfinal and semifinal, but they ran into South Dakota State yet again in the championship. NDSU fell to SDSU again, and the Bison did not receive an at-large bid to the NCAA tournament. Since they were the regular season champion for the Summit League and did not make the NCAA tournament, they received an automatic bid to the 2026 Women's Basketball Invitation Tournament, their first. They were the top seed in their region as well, and won their first round game against Chattanooga. However, they fell to Columbia in the second round. Collins' North Dakota State team finished with a 29–5 overall record, and a 15–1 Summit League record, both being NDSU Division I bests. At the end of the season, Collins received the 2026 Kay Yow Award.

== Head coaching record ==
Record table
Season	Team	Overall	Conference	Standing	Postseason
Emporia State Lady Hornets (Mid-America Intercollegiate Athletics Association) (2010–2018)
2010–11	Emporia State	20–9	18–7		
2011–12	Emporia State	23–9	14–8		NCAA Sweet 16
2012–13	Emporia State	23–9	14–5		NCAA Sweet 16
2013–14	Emporia State	30–4	19–3	T–2nd	NCAA Regionals
2014–15	Emporia State	29–5	15–4	T–2nd	NCAA Final Four
2015–16	Emporia State	28–6	17–5	4th	NCAA Sweet 16
2016–17	Emporia State	29–5	15–4	3rd	NCAA Sweet 16
2017–18	Emporia State	17–11	11–8	T–6th	
Emporia State:		199–58	123–44		
North Dakota State Bison (Summit League) (2019–present)
2019–20	North Dakota State	11–19	7–9	6th	
2020–21	North Dakota State	15–9	9–7	3rd	
2021–22	North Dakota State	11–18	7–11	6th	
2022–23	North Dakota State	18–12	12–6	2nd	WNIT First Round
2023–24	North Dakota State	22–12	13–3	2nd	WNIT Super 16
2024–25	North Dakota State	21–12	11–5	3rd	WNIT Great 8
2025–26	North Dakota State	29–5	15–1	1st	WBIT Second Round
2026–27	North Dakota State				
North Dakota State:		127–87	64–42		
Total:		326–145			
National champion Postseason invitational champion Conference regular season champion Conference regular season and conference tournament champion Division regular season champion Division regular season and conference tournament champion Conference tournament champion

== Personal life ==
Collins and his wife, Casey, have two sons, Jett and Jude.

Collins competed in high school sports.

He received his bachelor's of science from ESU in 2002 and his master's degree in 2006.
