= Emporia State Lady Hornets basketball =

Emporia State Lady Hornets
2024–25 Emporia State Lady Hornets basketball team
- University: Emporia State University
- First season: 1974–75
- Athletic director: Steve Rodecap
- Head coach: MJ Baker (1st season)
- Location: Emporia, Kansas
- Arena: William L. White Auditorium (capacity: 5,000)
- Conference: The MIAA
- Nickname: Lady Hornets
- Colors: Black and gold
- Student section: E-Zone
- All-time record: 1018–479 (.680)

NCAA Division I tournament champions
- 2010
Other NCAA Division I tournament results
Final Four	1998, 1999, 2010, 2015
Elite Eight	1998, 1999, 2000, 2006, 2010, 2015
Sweet Sixteen	2001, 2005, 2008, 2010, 2012, 2013, 2014, 2015, 2016, 2017
Appearances	1997, 1998, 1999, 2000, 2001, 2003, 2004, 2005, 2006, 2007, 2008, 2009, 2010, 2012, 2013, 2014, 2015, 2016, 2017, 2019, 2020, 2021

Conference tournament champions
- Central States Intercollegiate Conference; 1979, 1980, 1981, 1982, 1985 Mid-America Intercollegiate Athletics Association; 1998, 1999, 2000, 2001, 2013, 2014, 2015, 2016, 2017

Conference regular-season champions
- Central States Intercollegiate Conference; 1979, 1980, 1981, 1982, 1985 Mid-America Intercollegiate Athletics Association; 1997, 1998, 1999, 2000, 2001, 2004, 2008, 2009

Uniforms
Home	Away	Alternate

The Emporia State Lady Hornets basketball team represents Emporia State University and competes in the Mid-America Intercollegiate Athletics Association (MIAA) of the NCAA Division II. On April 15, 2025, MJ Baker was announced as the ninth head coach.

== Overview ==
The Lady Hornets annually play a nineteen-game conference schedule that is preceded by an out-of-conference schedule that includes one exhibition game between the Kansas Jayhawks or the Kansas State Wildcats, switching every other year. The conference schedule consists of playing every MIAA member at least once, some twice. Emporia State does, however, play the Washburn Ichabods in the rivalry known as the Turnpike Tussle and the Pittsburg State Gorillas twice a year.

== History ==
Emporia State Coaching History
Tenure	Coach	Won	Lost	Pct.
1974–1976	Caruthers	30	12	.714
1976–1981	Jones	89	43	.674
1981–1995	Schierling	212	182	.538
1995–1998	Stein	65	25	.722
1998–2010	Schneider	306	72	.810
2010–2018	Collins	199	58	.774
2018–2023	Wynn	93	52	.641
2023–2025	Ostermann	24	35	.407
2025–present	Baker	0	0	–
Total: 50 seasons	9 coaches	1018–479		.680

Emporia State's women's basketball program was established in 1974, one-hundred and eleven years after the university was founded. Since 1974, the Lady Hornets have belonged to three conferences. When the school was a National Association of Intercollegiate Athletics, they participated in the Great Plains Athletic Conference until 1976, Central States Intercollegiate Conference from 1976 to 1989, back to the Rocky Mountain Athletic Conference from 1989 to 1991, and when the university was recognized as an NCAA Division II school in 1991, they joined the MIAA.

=== Early history ===
==== Linda Caruthers era: 1974–1976 ====
Linda Caruthers became the program's first head coach, earning a 30–12 record over two seasons from 1974 to 1976. The inaugural game was a 73–52 win against the Washburn Lady Blues, a future-MIAA rival from Topeka, Kansas. ESU would then go on to lose their next game, and first loss of the program, to Fort Hays State – 61–80. For the next five seasons, Debbie Jones took over the helm of the program.

==== Debbie Jones era: 1976–1981 ====
During Jones' first year, the Lady Hornets went 10–10, but then improved to a 15–8 record the following year. For the next three seasons, the Lady Hornets had a combined record of 64–24, leaving Jones with an 89–43 record. While Jones was the head coach, Emporia State won three conference championships.

Record table
Early Years 1974–1981 — Year-by-year record
Season	Team	Overall	Conference	Standing	Postseason
Linda Caruthers (Great Plains Athletic Conference) (1974–1976)
1974–75	Linda Caruthers	13–8			
1975–76	Linda Caruthers	17–4			
Linda Caruthers:		30–12			
Debbie Jones (Central States Intercollegiate Conference) (1976–1981)
1976–77	Debbie Jones	10–10			
1977–78	Debbie Jones	15–8			
1978–79	Debbie Jones	25–7			
1979–80	Debbie Jones	19–10			
1980–81	Debbie Jones	20–7			
Debbie Jones:		79–32			
Total:		119–55			
National champion Postseason invitational champion Conference regular season champion Conference regular season and conference tournament champion Division regular season champion Division regular season and conference tournament champion Conference tournament champion

=== Val Schierling era: 1981–1995 ===
When Jones left after the 1980–81 season, Val Schierling took over as head coach for the Lady Hornets until 1995. In his first season, the Lady Hornets finished 17–10, winning the CSIC regular season championship. For the next three seasons, the Lady Hornets had successful seasons, going 49–35. In the 1985–1986 season, the Lady Hornets went 15–15 and the next season went 11–15, making it the first losing season since the program started.

After the 1986–87 season, the Lady Hornets had only three winning seasons from 1987 to 1988 and again from 1989 to 1991. From 1991 to 95, Schierling had a combined record of 45–64. After three consecutive losing seasons, Schierling was fired after the 1994–1995 season. Schierling is the second all-time winningest coach in Emporia State History with a record of 212–182 (.538).

Record table
Val Schierling 1981–1995 — Year-by-year record
Season	Team	Overall	Conference	Standing	Postseason
Val Schierling (Central States Intercollegiate Conference) (1981–1995)
1981–82	Val Schierling	17–10			
1982–83	Val Schierling	16–10			
1983–84	Val Schierling	17–12			
1984–85	Val Schierling	16–3			
1985–86	Val Schierling	15–15			
1986–87	Val Schierling	11–17			
1987–88	Val Schierling	20–9			
1988–89	Val Schierling	11–19			
NCAA Independent
1989–90	Val Schierling	21–9			
1990–91	Val Schierling	23–4			
Mid-America Intercollegiate Athletics Association
1991–92	Val Schierling	14–17	8–8		
1992–93	Val Schierling	10–16	6–10		
1993–94	Val Schierling	10–16	4–12		
1994–95	Val Schierling	11–15	5–11		
Total:		212–189			
National champion Postseason invitational champion Conference regular season champion Conference regular season and conference tournament champion Division regular season champion Division regular season and conference tournament champion Conference tournament champion

=== Cindy Stein era: 1995–1998 ===
After the firing of Val Schierling, Cindy Stein accepted the position as head coach. While Stein only coached for three years at ESU, she was able to turn the program around. In her first season, she went 12–14, quickly turning it around to 20–10 the following season, its first winning season since 1991. In her third and final season at Emporia State, Stein led the program to its first conference regular season and tournament championships, as well as the program's first trip to the NCAA Women's Division II Basketball Championship. Stein left to become the head coach of the Missouri Tigers, leaving Emporia State with a 65–25 record.

Record table
Cindy Stein 1995–1998 — Year-by-year record
Season	Team	Overall	Conference	Standing	Postseason
Cindy Stein (Mid-America Intercollegiate Athletics Association) (1995–1998)
1995–96	Cindy Stein	12–14	6–10		
1996–97	Cindy Stein	20–10	11–7		NCAA Regional finalist
1997–98	Cindy Stein	33–1	16–0		NCAA National Runners–up
Total:		65–25			
National champion Postseason invitational champion Conference regular season champion Conference regular season and conference tournament champion Division regular season champion Division regular season and conference tournament champion Conference tournament champion

=== Brandon Schneider era: 1998–2010 ===
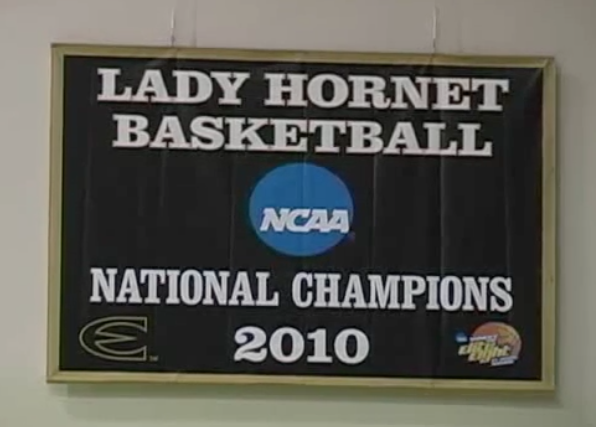
2010 National Championship banner hanging in White Auditorium

After being an assistant coach for three years, Schneider was promoted to head coach after Stein left for the University of Missouri. In Schneider's 12 years at the helm, he became the winningest coach in Emporia State history with a record of 306–72. With that record, Schneider lead the Lady Hornets to six MIAA regular season championships, three MIAA tournaments championships, four Regional championships, as well as Emporia State's first NCAA Division II National Championship in any sport. Schneider lead the Lady Hornets to 12 NCAA Tournaments, seven MIAA regular season championships, four MIAA Tournament championships, four NCAA II South Central Regional championships, and two NCAA II Final Four appearances.

In Schneider's first three seasons, he compiled a record of 86–9 overall, and 48–4 in conference play. In those three seasons, Schneider lead the Lady Hornets to three consecutive regular season and conference tournament championships, and to the NCAA Sweet 16 all three years, the Elite 8 All three years, and the Final Four one year. The 2001–02 season was Schneider's only season with less than 20 wins, and not making the post season.

Following his lowest record, Schneider quickly turned the team around. From 2002 to 2006, Schneider lead the Lady Hornets to 20 plus win seasons, and a trip to either the NCAA Sweet 16 or the NCAA Elite Eight. In 2003–04, Schneider led the team to its 5th conference regular season championship since joining the MIAA in 1991, and Schneider's third conference championship. In both the 2002–03 and 2003–04 seasons, Schneider led the team to the NCAA Regionals. Between 2004 and 2009, the Lady Hornets had a combined record of 125–46 overall, 72–25 in conference play, won two conference championships in 2007 and 2008, and advance to the NCAA Tournament each of those years.

In the 2009–10 season, Schneider's final season, the Lady Hornets finished with a 30–5 record, 16–4 in conference play, and on to win the NCAA Women's Division II Basketball Championship. The Lady Hornets finished second in the conference regular season and tournament, and won the South Central Regional tournament. In the first game of the Elite Eight, Emporia defeated the Michigan Tech Huskies 62–50. In the Final Four, the Lady Hornets struggled to beat Gannon University, but defeated them 97–94. The Championship game was kept close, with the final score 65–53. Schneider left for Stephen F. Austin, leaving Emporia State with a record of 306–72 (.810), becoming the winningest coach in ESU history.

Schneider coached six NCAA Division II All-Americans and two national players of the year in his twelve years as at Emporia State. Schneider was also the first rookie head coach in the history of the MIAA to win both the regular conference season and tournament titles.

Record table
Brandon Schneider 1998–2010 — Year-by-year record
Season	Team	Overall	Conference	Standing	Postseason
Brandon Schneider (MIAA) (1998–2010)
1998–99	Brandon Schneider	30–3	15–1		NCAA Final Four
1999–00	Brandon Schneider	28–4	16–2		NCAA Elite 8
2000–01	Brandon Schneider	28–2	17–1		NCAA Sweet 16
2001–02	Brandon Schneider	16–12	8–10		
2002–03	Brandon Schneider	23–8	14–4		NCAA Regional Finalist
2003–04	Brandon Schneider	24–5	15–3		NCAA Regional Finalist
2004–05	Brandon Schneider	27–6	14–4		NCAA Sweet 16
2005–06	Brandon Schneider	28–5	13–3		NCAA Elite 8
2006–07	Brandon Schneider	22–8	14–4		NCAA First Round
2007–08	Brandon Schneider	23–8	14–4		NCAA Sweet 16
2008–09	Brandon Schneider	26–6	17–3		NCAA Regional Finalist
2009–10	Brandon Schneider	30–5	16–4		NCAA Div. II National Champions
Brandon Schneider:		306–72	173–43		
Total:		306–72			
National champion Postseason invitational champion Conference regular season champion Conference regular season and conference tournament champion Division regular season champion Division regular season and conference tournament champion Conference tournament champion

=== Jory Collins era: 2010–2018 ===
Jory Collins, who was assistant coach for seven years under Schneider, became head coach in April 2010. In his seven seasons at helm of the Lady Hornets program, Collins has gone on to win five consecutive MIAA Conference tournaments (2013–2017) and has a combined record of 190–50 overall and a 115–37 record in the MIAA. He is the first coach in Emporia State history to advance to seven conference tournament championships and five regional championships in six years. Collins left to join Schneider at the University of Kansas in March 2018.

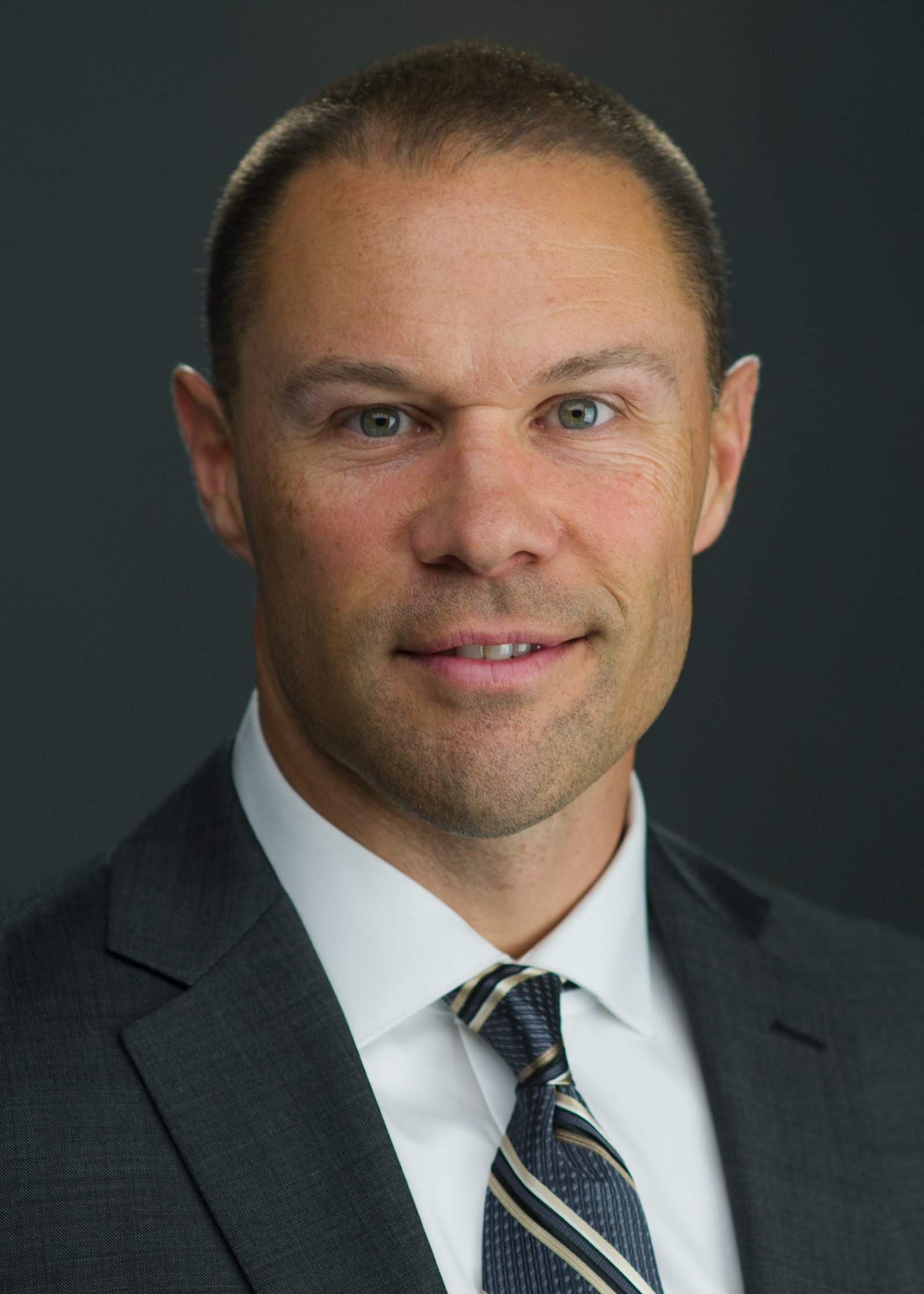
Collins served as head coach from 2010 to 2018

In his first season, Collins led the team to a 20–9 overall, and 15–7 conference winning season. He led them to the MIAA Tournament title game, which they lost to the Northwest Missouri Bearcats. Collins led the team to a 23–9 overall, and 14–6 conference winning season in the 2011–12 season. With that, the Lady Hornets advanced to their second consecutive MIAA Tournament title game, in which they lost. They also advanced on to the NCAA Sweet 16 where they lost to the Pittsburg State Gorillas.

In 2012–13, the Lady Hornets were preseason ranked 19 in the WBCA poll. During the 2012–13 season, Collins lead the Lady Hornets to an overall record of 23–9, and 13–5 conference winning season. The Lady Hornets won their third consecutive MIAA tournament title game, in which they defeated the Central Missouri Jennies 67–51. This was their fifth tournament win, and first since the tournament moved to Kansas City, Missouri in 2003. They again made it to the NCAA Sweet 16, where they lost to the Augustana Vikings 75–74.

In 2013–14, the Lady Hornets were preseason ranked 9 in the Women's Division II Bulletin Preseason Top 10 Rankings poll. During the 2013–14 season, Collins lead the Lady Hornets finished with an overall record of 30–4, and 16–3 conference winning season. For the fourth consecutive season, Collins coached the Lady Hornets to their fourth MIAA tournament title game, in which they won against the Central Missouri Jennies. The Lady Hornets went to the NCAA Regionals, in which they lost to the Concordia–St. Paul Golden Bears 70–67. At the end of the season in March 2014, Collins was selected as the NCAA Division II Region 7 Russell Athletic/WBCA Coach of the Year.

In 2014–15 season, the Lady Hornets were preseason ranked 7th in the Women's Division II Bulletin Preseason Top 10 Rankings poll. During the 2014–15 season, Collins lead the Lady Hornets to an overall record of 29–5, and 15–4 conference winning season. For the fifth consecutive season, Collins coached the Lady Hornets to their fifth MIAA tournament title game, in which they won their third-straight against the Fort Hays State Tigers 49–46. The Lady Hornets went to the NCAA Regionals, in which they again beat Fort Hays State in the Finals to move on to the Elite Eight. Collins then led the team to the Final Four, where they lost to the California Vulcans. In post-season honors, Collins won the Kansas Basketball Coaches Association "Coach of the Year".

Entering into the 2015–16 season, the Lady Hornets were chosen as the national favorite in both the D-II Bulletin Preseason National Poll and the Women's Basketball Coaches Association, as well as the MIAA polls. The first loss of the season came in December against Fort Hays State, where the Tigers defeated Emporia State 71–70. The Lady Hornets would then go on to lose four more times by 15 or less points. The Lady Hornets ended the regular season 23–5 (17–5 in conference play)finishing in fourth place in the MIAA standings. The Lady Hornets competed in the MIAA Conference Tournament in Kansas City, Kansas, where they won their fourth straight Conference Tournament Championship. The Lady Hornets ended the postseason in their fifth straight Sweet 16, losing to conference rival Pittsburg State, and finished with an overall record of 28–6.

After winning their fourth straight Conference Tournament Championship, the Lady Hornets entered the 2016–17 season ranked fourth in the nation. and the favorite to win in the MIAA. As was the case in the previous season, the Lady Hornets' first loss of the season came in December to Fort Hays State where the Tigers defeated the Lady Hornets by three points. The Lady Hornets would go on to finish out the regular season losing only three more times and winning most games by 10 or more points, finishing the regular season 24–4 overall, 15–4 in conference play tying for second place in the MIAA. The Lady Hornets won their fifth straight MIAA Conference Tournament Championship, and finished the postseason losing the Sweet 16 to Harding.

The 2017–18 season brought some challenges to the Lady Hornets basketball team. Two of the team's seniors were out with knee and ankle injuries that occurred prior to the season. Collins led the Lady Hornets to an overall record of 17–11, and 11–8 conference record, ending a five-consecutive MIAA Tournament championship streak and marking the first time the Lady Hornets did not make the NCAA postseason since 2011.

Record table
Jory Collins 2010–2018 — Year-by-year record
Season	Team	Overall	Conference	Standing	Postseason
Jory Collins (Mid-America Intercollegiate Athletics Association) (2010–2018)
2010–11	Jory Collins	20–9	18–7		
2011–12	Jory Collins	23–9	14–8		NCAA Sweet 16
2012–13	Jory Collins	23–9	14–5		NCAA Sweet 16
2013–14	Jory Collins	30–4	19–3	T–2nd	NCAA Regionals
2014–15	Jory Collins	29–5	15–4	T–2nd	NCAA Final Four
2015–16	Jory Collins	28–6	17–5	4th	NCAA Sweet 16
2016–17	Jory Collins	29–5	15–4	3rd	NCAA Sweet 16
2017–18	Jory Collins	17–11	11–8	T–6th	
Jory Collins:		199–58	123–44		
Total:		199–58			
National champion Postseason invitational champion Conference regular season champion Conference regular season and conference tournament champion Division regular season champion Division regular season and conference tournament champion Conference tournament champion

=== Toby Wynn era: 2018–2023 ===
On April 6, 2018, Toby Wynn was announced as the seventh head basketball coach. Wynn previously served 13 years as the head women's basketball coach at Seward County Community College where he led the program to a record of 349–84 (.806). In March 2023, Wynn stepped down as head coach.

Record table
Toby Wynn 2018–2023 — Year-by-year record
Season	Team	Overall	Conference	Standing	Postseason
Toby Wynn (Mid-America Intercollegiate Athletics Association) (2018–2023)
2018–19	Emporia State	22–9	13–6		NCAA Central Regional
2019–20	Emporia State	24–7	15–4		NCAA Central Regional
2020–21	Emporia State	18–7	17–5		NCAA Central Regional
2021–22	Emporia State	15–14	10–12		
2022–23	Emporia State	14–15	9–13		
Emporia State:		93–52	64–40		
Total:		93–52			
National champion Postseason invitational champion Conference regular season champion Conference regular season and conference tournament champion Division regular season champion Division regular season and conference tournament champion Conference tournament champion

=== Brian Osterman: 2023–present ===
On April 28, 2023, Kansas State Wildcats women's basketball associate head coach, Brian Ostermann, was named the next head coach.

Record table
Season	Team	Overall	Conference	Standing	Postseason
Brian Ostermann (Mid-America Intercollegiate Athletics Association) (2023–present)
2023–24	Emporia State	14-16	10-12	T-8th	
2024–25	Emporia State	10-19	5-14	10th	
Brian Ostermann:		24-35	15-26		
Total:		24-35			
National champion Postseason invitational champion Conference regular season champion Conference regular season and conference tournament champion Division regular season champion Division regular season and conference tournament champion Conference tournament champion

== Record vs. MIAA opponents ==
Emporia State vs. MIAA members
Current MIAA members
Emporia State vs.	First game	Overall record	at Emporia	at Opponent's venue	at Neutral site	Last 5 meetings	Last 10 meetings	Current streak	Since joining the MIAA
Central Missouri	1974–75	ESU, 42–35	ESU, 22–11	UCM, 12–21	ESU, 8–3	ESU, 3–2	ESU, 7–3	W 1	ESU, 35–23
Central Oklahoma	1989–90	ESU, 24–6	ESU, 12–1	ESU, 8–5	ESU, 4–1	ESU, 3–2	ESU, 7–3	L 1	ESU, 13–3
Fort Hays State	1974–75	ESU, 54–34	ESU, 26–11	ESU, 20–19	ESU, 7–4	ESU, 3–2	ESU, 8–2	W 1	ESU, 21–8
Lincoln^{†}	1982–83	ESU, 30–2	ESU, 18–1	ESU, 11–1	ESU, 1–0	ESU, 5–0	ESU, 10–0	W 20	ESU, 13–0^{‡}
Lindenwood	2012–13	ESU, 7–1	ESU, 5–0	ESU, 1–1	N/A	ESU, 6–1	ESU, 6–1	W 1	ESU, 6–1
Missouri Southern	1976–77	ESU, 59–24	ESU, 34–6	ESU, 22–18	ESU, 3–0	ESU, 4–1	ESU, 9–1	W 2	ESU, 36–14
Missouri Western	1976–77	ESU, 58–35	ESU, 34–11	MWSU, 18–23	ESU, 5–1	ESU, 3–2	ESU, 8–2	L 1	ESU, 38–21
Nebraska–Kearney	1976–77	ESU, 33–12	ESU, 18–3	ESU, 15–8	UNK, 0–1	ESU, 3–2	ESU, 8–2	L 2	ESU, 10–2
Northeastern State	1989–90	ESU, 17–6	ESU, 9–2	ESU, 7–4	ESU, 1–0	ESU, 4–1	ESU, 9–1	W 3	ESU, 10–5
NW Missouri St.	1975–76	ESU, 43–14	ESU, 21–5	ESU, 20–7	Tied, 2–2	ESU, 5–0	ESU, 10–0	W 10	ESU, 40–14
Pittsburg State	1974–75	ESU, 62–29	ESU, 33–12	ESU, 24–16	ESU, 5–3	ESU, 4–1	'ESU, 7–3	L 1	ESU, 37–19
Washburn	1974–75	ESU, 56–47	ESU, 22–17	WU, 21–23	WU, 5–8	WU, 2–3	ESU, 7–3	L 3	ESU, 32–22
^{†} – Lincoln left the MIAA after the 1998–99 season and rejoined in the 2010–11 season. ^{‡} – Does not include the 1991–1999 seasons.

== Venue and culture ==
=== Home arena ===
Since 1974, home basketball games have been played at William L. White Auditorium, a 5,000-seat arena named after William Lindsay White, son of William Allen White. The auditorium is also home to the men's basketball team and the Lady Hornets volleyball team since the program started in 1973. In 2008, White Auditorium received an upgrade with a new scoreboard, video board, and a new paint scheme on the basketball court.

==== School colors ====
Black	Gold

Emporia State's official school colors are black and gold. They have been the colors since the school was founded in 1863, and until recently, the gold was Old gold.

=== Mascot ===
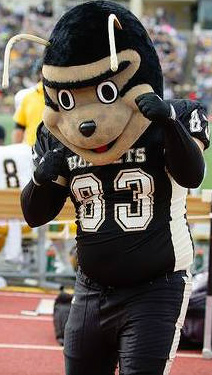
Corky the Hornet at an Emporia State football game.

Corky the Hornet is Emporia State University's mascot. In 1923 when the Emporia State was named to the Kansas State Teachers College, the athletic teams were called the "Yaps". Many people, including former men's basketball coach Vic Trusler, did not like the name. Trusler suggested to a writer at the Emporia Gazette that the new name should be the "Yellow Jackets". But due to the lack of newspaper space, the name changed to "Hornets".

In 1933, the Teachers College had a student contest where students and staff could design a mascot for the college. Sophomore Paul Edwards, who graduated in 1937, designed Corky. Although hundreds of drawings were submitted, Edwards' Corky, a "human-like" hornet was selected. Corky was published in The Bulletin, the student newspaper for Emporia State University.
