= Brandon Schneider =

American basketball player and coach

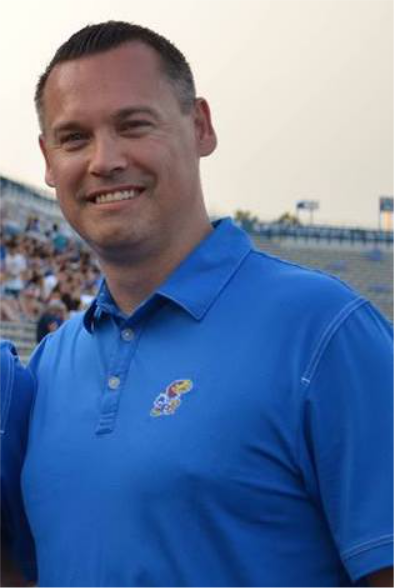

Current position
- Title: Head coach
- Team: Kansas
- Conference: Big 12
- Record: 165–177 (.482)
- Annual salary: $300,000

Biographical details
- Born: December 4, 1971 (age 54); Canyon, Texas, U.S.

Playing career
- 1991–1995: Wayland Baptist

Coaching career (HC unless noted)
- 1995–1998: Emporia State (assistant)
- 1998–2010: Emporia State
- 2010–2015: Stephen F. Austin
- 2015–present: Kansas

Head coaching record
- Overall: 567–315 (.643)
- Tournaments: 26–14

Accomplishments and honors

Championships
- NCAA Division II Tournament championship (2010); WNIT Championship (2023); 2× Southland regular season championship (2014 T, 2015); 7× MIAA regular season championships (1999–2001, 2004, 2008, 2009); 3× MIAA Tournament championships (1999–2001)

Awards
- 2022 Big 12 Coach of the Year; D-II Bulletin NCAA Division II National Coach of the Year (2010); 4× WBCA South Central Region Coach of the Year; 3× MIAA Coach of the Year

Records
- Most wins in Emporia State history (306)

Brandon Schneider (born December 4, 1971) is an American college women's basketball coach at the University of Kansas. Schneider was previously the head coach, from 2010 to 2015, for Stephen F. Austin State University, and from 1998 to 2010 at Emporia State University, an NCAA Division II school located in Emporia, Kansas, where he led the team to the 2010 National Championship.

== Coaching career ==
=== Emporia State University ===
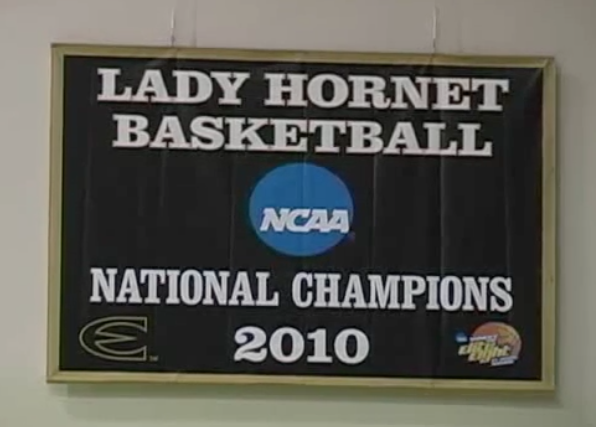
2010 National Championship banner hanging in White Auditorium

After a successful playing career at Wayland Baptist University, Schneider was hired as an assistant coach at Emporia State University (ESU) in 1995. After three years of being an assistant coach, Schneider was promoted to head coach, where he stayed for 12 years compiling an overall record of 306–72.

After being an assistant coach for three years, Schneider was promoted to head coach after head coach Cindy Stein left for the University of Missouri. In Schneider's 12 years at the helm, he became the winningest coach in Emporia State history with a record of 306–72. While at Emporia State, Schneider won six MIAA regular season titles, three MIAA tournaments, four Regional titles and the school's first-ever Division II National title in any sport. Schneider led the Lady Hornets to 12 NCAA Tournaments, seven MIAA Regular Season Championships, four MIAA Tournament Championships, four NCAA II South Central Regional Championships, and two NCAA II Final Four Appearances.

=== Stephen F. Austin University ===
In April 2010, one month after leading Emporia State to a National Championship, Schneider became head coach at Stephen F. Austin State University. Schneider won his first conference title during the 2013–14 season with a 13–5 record in league play and reached the championship game of the Women's Basketball Invitational.

=== University of Kansas ===
On April 21, 2015, Schneider was introduced as the new head coach at the University of Kansas, following Bonnie Henrickson, who was fired in March 2015.

Schneider led the 2022–23 Kansas Jayhawks women's basketball team to the 2023 Women's National Invitation Tournament, where they defeated the Columbia Lions in the WNIT championship.

== Personal life ==
Prior to coaching, Schneider was a 1995 honors graduate of Wayland Baptist University. During his time at Wayland Baptist, Schneider was a four-year letterman in men's basketball and was the school's first-ever All-American, capturing the honor three times. Schneider's father, Bob, was one of the most successful women's coaches at the NCAA Division II level, having served as the head coach at West Texas A&M from 1981 to 2006. They became the first father/son combination to take teams to the Elite Eight. Schneider and his wife Ali have two sons.

== Head coach record ==
Record table
| Season | Team | Overall | Conference | Standing | Postseason |
|---|---|---|---|---|---|
Emporia State Lady Hornets (Mid-America Intercollegiate Athletics Association) (1998–2010)
| 1998–99 | Emporia State | 30–3 | 15–1 | | NCAA Division II Final Four |
| 1999–00 | Emporia State | 28–4 | 16–2 | | NCAA Elite 8 |
| 2000–01 | Emporia State | 28–2 | 17–1 | | NCAA Division II Sweet 16 |
| 2001–02 | Emporia State | 16–12 | 8–10 | | |
| 2002–03 | Emporia State | 23–8 | 14–4 | | NCAA Regional Finalist |
| 2003–04 | Emporia State | 24–5 | 15–3 | | NCAA Div. II Elite Eight |
| 2004–05 | Emporia State | 27–6 | 14–4 | | NCAA Sweet 16 |
| 2005–06 | Emporia State | 28–5 | 13–3 | | NCAA Elite 8 |
| 2006–07 | Emporia State | 22–8 | 14–4 | | NCAA First Round |
| 2007–08 | Emporia State | 23–8 | 14–4 | | NCAA Sweet 16 |
| 2008–09 | Emporia State | 26–6 | 17–3 | | NCAA Elite Eight |
| 2009–10 | Emporia State | 30–5 | 16–4 | | NCAA National Champions |
| Emporia State: | | 306–72 (.810) | 173–43 (.801) | | |
Stephen F. Austin Ladyjacks (Southland Conference) (2010–2015)
| 2010–11 | Stephen F. Austin | 12–18 | 9–7 | | |
| 2011–12 | Stephen F. Austin | 24–10 | 11–5 | | WBI First Round |
| 2012–13 | Stephen F. Austin | 14–17 | 8–10 | T-6th | |
| 2013–14 | Stephen F. Austin | 23–13 | 13–5 | T-1st | WBI Runner Up |
| 2014–15 | Stephen F. Austin | 23–8 | 16–2 | 1st | WNIT First Round |
| Stephen F. Austin: | | 96–66 (.593) | 57–29 (.663) | | |
Kansas Jayhawks (Big 12 Conference) (2015–present)
| 2015–16 | Kansas | 6–25 | 0–18 | 10th | |
| 2016–17 | Kansas | 8–22 | 2–16 | 10th | |
| 2017–18 | Kansas | 12–18 | 3–15 | 9th | |
| 2018–19 | Kansas | 13–18 | 2–16 | 10th | |
| 2019–20 | Kansas | 15–14 | 4–14 | 10th | |
| 2020–21 | Kansas | 7–18 | 3–15 | T-9th | |
| 2021–22 | Kansas | 21–10 | 11–7 | 5th | NCAA Second Round |
| 2022–23 | Kansas | 25–11 | 9–9 | 7th | WNIT Champions |
| 2023–24 | Kansas | 20–13 | 11–7 | 7th | NCAA Second Round |
| 2024-25 | Kansas | 16–14 | 6–12 | 11th | |
| 2025-26 | Kansas | 22–14 | 8–10 | T–11th | WBIT Semifinals |
| Kansas: | | 165–177 (.482) | 59–139 (.298) | | |
| Total: | | 567–315 (.643) | | | |
National champion Postseason invitational champion Conference regular season champion Conference regular season and conference tournament champion Division regular season champion Division regular season and conference tournament champion Conference tournament champion
