= Newman Jets =

- University: Newman University
- Conference: The MIAA
- NCAA: Division II
- Athletic director: Kenyon Spears
- Location: Wichita, Kansas
- Varsity teams: 19
- Basketball arena: Fugate Gymnasium
- Baseball stadium: McCarthy Field
- Mascot: Johnny Jet
- Nickname: Jets
- Fight song: The Heartbeat
- Colors: Navy and red
- Website: newmanjets.com

The Newman Jets are the athletic teams that represent Newman University, located in Wichita, Kansas, in intercollegiate sports as a member of the Division II level of the National Collegiate Athletic Association (NCAA), primarily competing in the Mid-America Intercollegiate Athletics Association (MIAA) for most of its sports as an associate member since the 2019–20 academic year (before achieving full member status in 2022–23); while its men's soccer team competes in the Great American Conference (GAC). The Jets previously competed in the D-II Heartland Conference from 2006–07 to 2018–19; and in the defunct Midlands Collegiate Athletic Conference (MCAC) of the National Association of Intercollegiate Athletics (NAIA) from 1999–2000 to 2005–06.

== Varsity teams ==
Newman competes in 19 intercollegiate varsity sports: Men's sports include baseball, basketball, bowling, cross country, golf, soccer, tennis, triathlon and wrestling; while women's sports include basketball, bowling, cheer & dance, cross country, golf, soccer, softball, tennis, triathlon and volleyball.

Men's sports	Women's sports
Baseball	Basketball
Basketball	Bowling
Bowling	Cheer and dance
Cross country	Cross country
Golf	Golf
Soccer	Soccer
Tennis	Softball
Triathlon	Tennis
Wrestling	Triathlon
	Volleyball

== Facilities ==
MIAA logo in Newman colors

- Fugate Gymnasium: men's and women's basketball, women's volleyball, and wrestling
- McCarthy Field: baseball
- Newman Softball Field: softball
- Wilkins Field men's and women's soccer
- Martin Park Gold Learning Center: men's and women's golf

On February 2, 2013, Newman University recognized the Potter family in dedicating Fugate Gymnasium as "Potter Family Court". The proceeds towards this event went to the Potter Family Scholarship, given to Newman student athletes. Newman University also has their student athletes participate with an organization called Student-Athlete Advisory Committee (SAAC). Within this organization student-athletes are to focus on raising money for organizations within the Wichita community and to organize events on campus.

Newman University also has a Hall of Fame, which honors these people or organizations for their contribution towards the university. Inductees include Larry Inlow, who was inducted into the Hall of Fame in 2010. He has contributed to the Wichita community and recently has been named 2013 Wichita B-52s (Professional Arena Soccer League) head coach.

In 2021, Newman announced new branding and logos for the athletic department and a new mission statement.

== Championships ==
Sport	Competition (years won)
Baseball	MCAC Tournament: (1996, 2001, 2006); District 10 Champions: (1981, 1983, 1993, 1994)
Men's basketball	National Tournament: (1970–71), (1977–78), (1999–00), (2001–02), (2004–05), (2012–13 NCAA Division II); MCAC Champions:(1999-00), (2001–03); MCAC Tournament Champions: (1999-00), (2001–02); District 10 Champions: (1970–71), (1977–78)
Women's basketball	National Tournament: (2011–12); MCAC Champions: (2002–03); Heartland Conference Champions: (2010–11), (2011–12)
Men's bowling	National Tournament: (2005, 2006, 2009, 2010, 2011); National Singles Champions: Cory Simmons (2004); NCBCA Coach of the year: Billy Murphy (2009); NCBCA MVP: Derek Hartnell (2010)
Women's bowling	National Tournament: (2004, 2005, 2006, 2007, 2008, 2009, 2010, 2011, 2012, 2013, 2014); National Singles Champion: Bianca Montagnino (2005), Georgia Drewes (2012)
Men's cross country	MCAC Champions: (2004, 2005); Heartland Conference Champions: (2012)
Men's golf	National Tournament: (2000, 2001, 2002, 2003, 2004); MCAC Champions: (2000, 2001, 2002, 2003, 2004); Heartland Conference: (2011)
Women's golf	National Tournament: (2013); MCAC Tournament Champions: (2005, 2006)
Men's soccer	MCAC Champions: (1994, 1996, 1997, 1998, 1999, 2000, 2002); MCAC Tournament Champions: (1994, 1996, 1998, 2000, 2001, 2002); National Tournament: (1996, 1999, 2000); Regional Tournament Champions: (1996, 1999, 2000)
Women's soccer	MCAC Tournament Champions: (2002); MCAC Champions: (2002, 2005)
Softball	MCAC Champions: (1995, 2001, 2004); MCAC Tournament Champions: (1995)
Men's volleyball	National Tournament: (2004, 2005, 2006)
Women's volleyball	MCAC Champions: (1994, 1995)
Wrestling	National Individual Champion: Curtis Chenoweth (2006); National Tournament: (2005); NCWA National Tournament: (2008); National Individual Champion: Josh Fansler (2008); National Individual Champion: Noel Torres (2018 NCAA Division II)

== Fight song ==
"The Heartbeat" is the official fight song of Newman University.
