= Arkansas–Fort Smith Lions =

- University: University of Arkansas–Fort Smith
- NCAA: Division II
- Conference: The MIAA
- Athletic director: Curtis Janz
- Location: Fort Smith, Arkansas
- Varsity teams: 11 (5 men's, 5 women's, 1 co-ed)
- Basketball arena: Stubblefield Center
- Baseball stadium: Crowder Field
- Tennis venue: Fort Smith Athletic Club
- Nickname: Lions
- Colors: Navy blue and white
- Mascot: Numa
- Website: uafortsmithlions.com
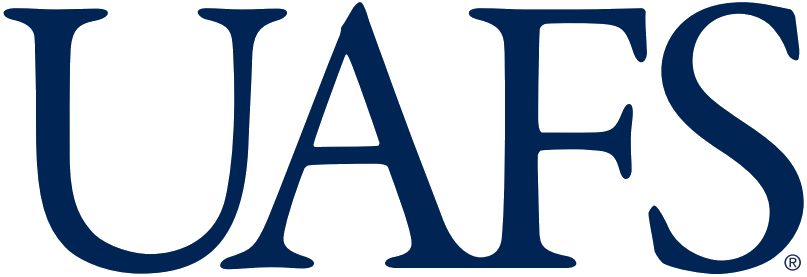

The Arkansas–Fort Smith Lions (also UAFS Lions and UA Fort Smith Lions) are the athletic teams that represent the University of Arkansas–Fort Smith, located in Fort Smith, Arkansas, in NCAA Division II intercollegiate sports. The Lions compete as members of the Mid-America Intercollegiate Athletics Association (MIAA) for all 10 varsity sports.

== History ==
In the fall of 2009, UAFS formally entered provisional NCAA Division II status. The "provisional" status was scheduled to be removed in 2010. However, on July 9, 2010, the university's membership application was rejected by the NCAA Division II Membership Committee, which led to the university filing an appeal. On July 8, 2011, the university was granted full NCAA Division II membership. Previously, the university competed in the National Junior College Athletic Association (NJCAA), specifically at the Bi-State Conference of Region II.

On June 27, 2023, UAFS announced that it would be moving its athletic programs from the Lone Star Conference to the Mid-America Intercollegiate Athletics Association. University officials cited reduced travel times and better potential for rivalries as reasons for the move.

== Conference affiliations ==
=== NCAA ===
- Heartland Conference (2009–2019)
- Lone Star Conference (2019–2024)
- Mid-America Intercollegiate Athletics Association (2024–present)

== Varsity teams ==
=== List of teams ===
Men's sports

- Baseball
- Basketball
- Cross Country
- Golf
- Tennis

Women's sports

- Basketball
- Cross Country
- Golf
- Tennis
- Volleyball

== Individual sports ==
All school championships listed were earned while the school was member of the National Junior College Athletic Association known as Westark Community College or Wesark College

=== Men's basketball ===
- National Champions: 1981, 2006
- Region II Champions: 2001, 2002, 2006
- Bi-State Conference Champions: 2001, 2002, 2003, 2004, 2005, 2006

=== Women's basketball ===
- National Champions: 1995
- Region II Champions: 2004, 2005, 2006
- Bi-State Conference Champions: 2003

=== Women's volleyball ===
- Region II Champions: 2002, 2003, 2005, 2006
- Bi-State Conference Champions: 2002, 2003, 2004, 2005, 2006

The volleyball program also holds the distinction of being named an NJCAA Academic All-American Team seven years in a row (1999–2005).
