= KFFX (FM) =

- Emporia, Kansas; United States
- Broadcast area: Lyon County, Kansas and surrounding counties
- Frequency: 104.9 MHz
- Branding: Mix 104.9 KFFX

Programming
- Format: Hot adult contemporary

Ownership
- Owner: Emporia's Radio Stations, Inc.
- Sister stations: KVOE; KVOE-FM

History
- First air date: June 15, 1966 (as KVOE-FM)
- Former call signs: KVOE-FM (1966–1975); KLRF (1975–1984)
- Call sign meaning: Fox (previous branding)

Technical information
- Licensing authority: FCC
- Facility ID: 69778
- Class: A
- ERP: 3,000 watts
- HAAT: 85 meters (279 ft)
- Transmitter coordinates: 38°23′10.1″N 96°10′37″W

Links
- Public license information: Public file; LMS
- Webcast: Listen live
- Website: www.kvoe.com

KFFX (104.9 FM) is a radio station broadcasting a hot adult contemporary music format, broadcasting as "Mix 104.9 FM". The station is located in Emporia, Kansas, where it is also licensed. KFFX is owned by Emporia's Radio Stations, Inc.

== History ==
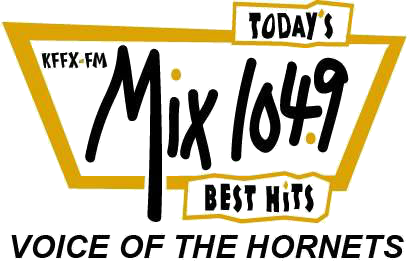
Voice of the Hornets logo.

KFFX signed on the air in June 1966 as the FM companion to KVOE (AM). Until the early 1970s KVOE-FM would simulcast most of its programming with the AM. In the 1970s it began playing some country music and then, around 1975, split altogether from the AM becoming KLRF (Colorful 105). Following a change in licensee in late 1984 to Emporia Broadcasting, the station shifted to a contemporary hit radio format and became KFFX (Fox 105). In January 1986 Valu Broadcasting acquired both the AM and FM stations. In 1994 Valu Broadcasting changed its name to Emporia's Radio Stations, Inc. KFFX shifted to a hot adult contemporary format around 2001 becoming Mix 104.9 and has retained that format since.

Mix 104.9 is home to the Emporia State University Hornets athletic teams. The station uses the slogan Voice of the Hornets during the sports seasons. Greg Rahe, KVOE sports director, left the station in July 2023 after spending 35 years as the Voice of the Hornets. He was replaced by Blake Cripps who moved to Emporia after spending nine years as the Voice of the Newman University Jets in Wichita, Kansas.
