= Hamilton Field House =

Multi-purpose venue at the University of Central Oklahoma

- Interactive map of Hamilton Field House
- Former names: Broncho Field House
- Location: 100 N. University Ave; Edmond, OK 73034
- Coordinates: 35.660064°N 97.471752°W
- Owner: University of Central Oklahoma
- Operator: University of Central Oklahoma
- Capacity: 3,000
- Surface: Multi-surface

Construction
- Groundbreaking: 1963
- Opened: January 8, 1965
- Renovated: 2001

Tenants
- Central Oklahoma Bronchos men's & women's basketball Central Oklahoma Bronchos wrestling Central Oklahoma Bronchos women's volleyball

Hamilton Field House is a 3,000-seat multi-purpose on the campus of the University of Central Oklahoma (UCO) in Edmond, Oklahoma, and is home to the Central Oklahoma Bronchos men's and women's basketball teams, as well as volleyball, and wrestling.

== History ==
It opened on January 8, 1965, when the Central Oklahoma men's basketball team defeated intrastate rival Northeastern State University 64–52. Prior to this the Bronchos played in the much smaller Wantland Hall, which now serves as the university's physical education building. The 3,000-seat facility was renamed from Hamilton Field House in 1993 in honor of longtime coach and athletic director Dale E. Hamilton, the driving force in the building's planning and construction. It was previously known as Broncho Field House. Hamilton Field House is also the home facility for the volleyball and wrestling teams. Numerous other events, including the university's graduation ceremonies, are held in the building. The facility was renovated before the 2001–02 season, including chairback seats installed near the arena floor level.
