= Jerry M. Hughes Athletics Center =

Multi-purpose arena in Warrensburg, Missouri

- "The Multi"
- Interactive map of Jerry M. Hughes Athletics Center
- Former names: CMSU Multipurpose Building (1976–2006); UCM Multipurpose Building (2006–2023)
- Coordinates: 38.757166°N 93.74924°W
- Owner: University of Central Missouri
- Operator: University of Central Missouri
- Capacity: 6,500 for basketball 10,000 for concerts

Construction
- Opened: November 27, 1976
- Cost: $9.5 million
- Architects: Mantel and Teeter, Kansas City, Missouri

Tenants
- Central Missouri Mules and Jennies (NCAA); Men's basketball Women's basketball Women's volleyball Indoor track

The Jerry M. Hughes Athletics Center is a 6,500 seat multi-purpose arena in Warrensburg, Missouri, United States, on the campus of the University of Central Missouri. It was built in 1976, and is the home of the Central Missouri Mules and Jennies men's and women's basketball, women's volleyball, and indoor track teams. With a listed seating capacity of 6,500 seats, it is one of the largest arenas by seating capacity in the Mid-America Intercollegiate Athletics Association. The building, originally known as the UCM Multipurpose Building, was renamed in August 2023 for longtime athletic director Jerry Hughes.
