= Southwest Baptist Bearcats =

- University: Southwest Baptist University
- Conference: GLVC
- NCAA: Division II
- Athletic director: Clark Sheehy
- Location: Bolivar, Missouri
- Varsity teams: 18
- Football stadium: Plaster Stadium
- Basketball arena: Jane and Ken Meyer Sports and Wellness Center
- Nickname: Bearcats
- Colors: Purple and white
- Website: www.sbubearcats.com
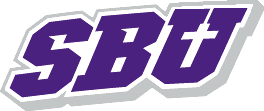

The Southwest Baptist University Bearcats are the sports teams of Southwest Baptist University located in Bolivar, Missouri. They participate in the NCAA's Division II Great Lakes Valley Conference (GLVC). The Bearcats had competed in the Mid-America Intercollegiate Athletics Association (MIAA) since 1986. In 2014, the Bearcats as well as the Lincoln Blue Tigers began competing in the GLVC as a football member-only team.

In fall 2016, Southwest Baptist University became one of the first 15 colleges and universities in the nation to offer esports as a varsity athletics program, with scholarships available. SBU is a charter member of the Collegiate Esports Association (CESPA).

On May 31, 2018, Southwest Baptist announced it would be withdrawing its membership from the MIAA to join the Great Lakes Valley Conference full-time, effective July 1, 2019.

SBU began a varsity Cheer and Stunt team beginning in the 2018–19 season.

The next sports to be added will be men's and women's swimming & diving and men's volleyball, all in 2025–26.

== Sports sponsored ==
Men's sports	Women's sports
Baseball	Basketball
Basketball	Cheer and Stunt (Note: SBU considers cheer and stunt to be a single program, but they are separate though closely related sports. Cheerleading has no NCAA recognition at all, while the NCAA recognizes stunt as part of its Emerging Sports for Women program.)
Cross country	Cross country
eSports	Golf
Football	Soccer
Golf	Softball
Soccer	Swimming & diving (in 2025–26)
Swimming & diving (in 2025–26)	Tennis
Tennis	Track and field^{†}
Track and field^{†}	Volleyball
Volleyball (in 2025–26)	
† – Track and field includes both indoor and outdoor

=== Football ===
The Bearcats football team is currently coached by Paul Hansen. Hansen is the 10th head football coach in Southwest Baptist University history.

=== Men's basketball ===
The Bearcats men's basketball team is currently under the direction of Clark Sheehy. Sheehy took over in 2014. He was previously coach at John Brown University in Arkansas.

=== Softball ===
The Bearcats softball team appeared in one Women's College World Series in 1971.

== National championships ==
=== Team ===
Sport	Association	Division	Year	Runner-up	Score
Men's Tennis (1)	NAIA (1)	Single (1)	1984	Lander	29–28

== Athletic facilities ==
- Plaster Stadium, is the home of the SBU Bearcat football team. The stadium was completed in 1985 and named in respect to Robert W. Plaster for his significant contribution towards the facility. Plaster is a businessman from Lebanon, Missouri. Some renovations include the field being re-turfed in 1988 and lights being installed in 1998.
- Robert W. Plaster Athletic Center, holds the football coaching staff offices, athletic meeting rooms, athletic training room, banquet room, weight room, and football locker room. Also, the athletic center provides an outside balcony for guest to watch a SBU football game. The facility was completed in 2001 from the major contribution of Robert W. Plaster.
- Jane and Ken Meyer Sports and Wellness Center, is home of the Bearcat men's basketball, women's basketball, and volleyball teams. The facility was built in 2004. The Sports Arena holds seating for 2,800 fans. The court is named in honor of Springfield, Mo businessman John Q. Hammons. The center houses Intramural Basketball and Volleyball Courts, Natatorium, Fitness Room, Weight Room, Indoor Walking or Jogging Track, Racquetball Courts, Rock Climbing Wall, Sports Café, Aerobic Room, Health and Physical Education Classrooms, Faculty and Athletic Offices, Athletic Training Room, and Citizen's Memorial Hospital Sports Medicine Clinic. Jane and Ken Meyer were the major contributors towards Sports and Wellness Center Project. The Natatorium is used for swimming classes, aquatic exercises, scuba classes, and for recreational use by SBU students, faculty, and staff. The Natatorium was funded by student activity fees and built in 1985. The Olympic size pool holds six lanes and has a one-meter diving board.
- John A. Bryant Tennis Center, is where the SBU men's and women's tennis teams compete. The Center was completed in 2000 and is composed of six side by side courts. Since the new facility opened SBU has hosted three NCAA Tournaments. Also, the courts are open to SBU students, faculty, staff, and the Bolivar community. The Center is named in admiration for John A. Bryant's long time service to SBU Tennis program.
- Dodson Field, is home of the Bearcat baseball team. The field was renovated in 2005 with new dugouts, new netting behind home plate, and concrete walls between the dugouts. Dodson field provides large dugouts, a grass infield, and Major League field dimensions. The field is named after James W. Dodson.
- SBU Softball Field, is where the SBU softball team play their home games. The field received some renovations in 2005 to improve the playing surface.
- SBU Soccer Field, is where the Men's and Women's soccer team hosts their opponents. The field is adjacent to Dodson Field and the SBU softball field. In 2003, overhangs for the benches were built on the south side of the field and a new scoreboard was constructed.
