= Gross Memorial Coliseum =

Multi-purpose arena in Hays, Kansas

Coordinates: 38.871703°N 99.348314°W

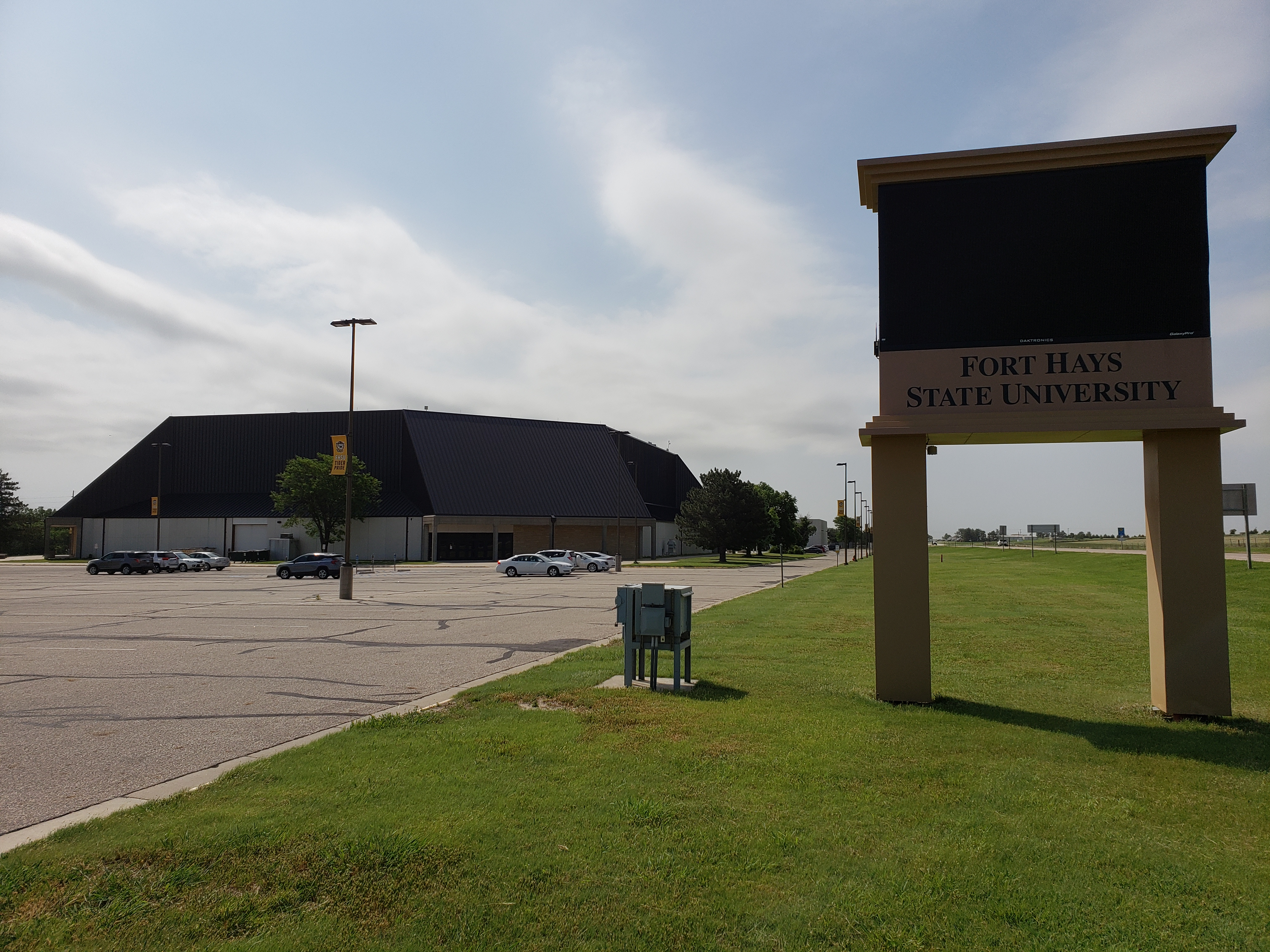
Gross Memorial Coliseum

The Gross Memorial Coliseum is a 6,814 seat multi-purpose arena in Hays, Kansas. It was built in 1973. It is the home of the Fort Hays State University Tigers women's volleyball team, as well as the men's and women's basketball teams. It also hosts state championship events for Classes 1A, 2A, and 3A wrestling (combined), 1A volleyball, and 1A boys' and girls' basketball for the Kansas State High School Activities Association.
