= William L. White Auditorium =

Multi-purpose arena in Kansas, United States

- White Auditorium
- Interactive map of William L. White Auditorium
- Former names: Civic Auditorium
- Location: 111 E. 6th Ave., Emporia, Kansas 66801 USA
- Coordinates: 38.4053°N 96.1835°W
- Owner: The City of Emporia
- Operator: The City of Emporia
- Capacity: 5,000
- Surface: Grade 1, one-inch thick, northern hardwood maple

Construction
- Groundbreaking: 1940
- Opened: 1941
- Cost: $613,375.17 ($14 million in 2025 dollars)

Tenants
- Emporia State men's & women's basketball Emporia State women's volleyball KSHSAA (volleyball - October; basketball – March)

William L. White Auditorium, commonly known as White Auditorium, is a 5,000 seat multi-purpose arena in Emporia, Kansas. It is home to the Emporia State University men's and women's basketball teams, as well as the volleyball team.

== History ==
The Emporia Civic Auditorium's – as it was known from 1940 to 1973 – construction began to in December 1938. On May 6, 1940, the City of Emporia kicked off a five-day "Fiestaval" to celebrate its opening. In 1963, it was renamed to its current name, William L. White Auditorium, named after local newspaper owner, William Lindsay White, who was also the son of William Allen White.

In December 1940, the Teachers College basketball team began playing their home games at the Auditorium, and in 1974 for the Emporia State Lady Hornets basketball games have been played there as well. When the volleyball program was established in 1973, it began to play its home games in White Auditorium. The building also hosts the Kansas State High School Activities Association state basketball tournament since 1955.

== Upgrades ==
During the 1994–95 basketball season, the Auditorium was renovated and bleacher seating was added to the south end of the court, expanding the seating capacity from 3,700 to 5,000. In 2008, White Auditorium went under renovation. A new color scheme was painted throughout the building, new scoreboards were added, the basketball court was refinished, and new seats replaced the wooden seats in the upper Auditorium.

=== Slaymaker Court ===
On February 20, 2013, the Emporia City Commission voted to name the floor of White Auditorium, Coach Slay, Ron Slaymaker Court, named after longtime men's basketball coach and ESU's winningest coach. On February 28, 2013, one week later, during the halftime of the men's ESU-Washburn game, Ron Slaymaker, and his family, alongside ESU President Michael D. Shonrock, ESU Athletic Director Kent Weiser, and the Mayor of Emporia, Bobbi Mlynar, unveiled the design of Ron Slaymaker Court, debuting in the fall of 2013.
