= John Lance Arena =

Pittsburg State Basketball Arena

Coordinates: 37°23′30″N 94°41′39″W

John Lance Arena is a 3,500 seat multi-purpose arena in Pittsburg, Kansas. It was built in 1971 and saw its first game played on December 4, 1971. It is the home of the Pittsburg State University Gorillas basketball teams.

The arena was named after John F. Lance, (1897 to 1981), educator and head basketball coach at PSU from 1923 until 1963. Lance led the team to win 47 consecutive games between 1929 and 1932, the longest winning streak in college basketball history until 1956. When John Lance retired in 1963 after 41 seasons, he was one of only five coaches in the nation with over 600 career wins—a total of 656 wins. Lance was inducted into the Naismith Memorial Basketball Hall of Fame, the National Association of Intercollegiate Athletics (NAIA) Hall of Fame, the Helms Foundation Hall of Fame and the Kansas Sports Hall of Fame.

The Gorillas truly have built a decisive home court advantage in John Lance Arena, except for Washburn University in which the Ichabods have won 5 straight in Pittsburg, by posting a 158-48 (.767) record on the court in 15 seasons under head coach Gene Iba. Pittsburg State won a school record 40 straight games in "The Pitt", before losing 76–74 to Truman State University in the semifinals of the MIAA Tournament on February 24, 1999.

The Pittsburg State University campus and Pittsburg community have rallied behind the Gorillas to help them rank among the top 30 schools in NCAA Division II for home-court attendance in 10 of the last 12 seasons. The Pitt State men's basketball team has averaged 2,004 fans in their last 164 home games and 2,433 fans in their 111 MIAA home games (regular season & post season) in the last 12 years.
