= Northwest Missouri State Bearcats =

- University: Northwest Missouri State University
- Conference: The MIAA
- NCAA: Division II
- Athletic director: Andy Peterson
- Location: Maryville, Missouri
- Varsity teams: 14
- Football stadium: Bearcat Stadium
- Basketball arena: Bearcat Arena
- Mascot: Bobby the Bearcat
- Nickname: Bearcat
- Colors: Bearcat green and white
- Website: bearcatsports.com

The Northwest Missouri State Bearcats are the athletic teams for Northwest Missouri State University, located in Maryville, Missouri. The Bearcats play in the NCAA Division II. Northwest is a founding member of the Mid-America Intercollegiate Athletics Association in 1912 and has remained in the conference ever since. From their founding until 1937, they competed in the Amateur Athletic Union (AAU). From 1937 to 1957, they competed in the National Association of Intercollegiate Athletics before joining NCAA Division II. Northwest has appeared in ten Division II football title games (winning six) since 1998. The men's basketball team appeared in an AAU title game in 1930, and won the Division II title in 2017, 2019, 2021, and 2022.

== Sports sponsored ==
MIAA logo in Northwest Missouri State's colors

Men's sports	Women's sports
Baseball	Basketball
Basketball	Cross country
Cross country	Golf
Football	Soccer
Tennis	Softball
Track and field^{1}	Tennis
	Track and field^{1}
	Volleyball
^{1} – includes both indoor and outdoor

=== Football ===
The Bearcats have appeared in ten NCAA Division II national title games (and won six) since going 0-11 in Mel Tjeerdsma's first season in 1994.

=== Basketball ===
==== Men's basketball ====
Northwest has won four national titles (2017, 2019, 2021, 2022) and appeared in another two Elite Eights (2002, 2004). Northwest was ranked #1 in 2020 going into the playoffs to defend its title but the playoffs were cancelled due to the COVID-19 pandemic in the United States.

==== Women's basketball ====
Head coach Michael Smith finished his second season at Northwest Missouri State after the 2014–15 season, with a total record of 18–37. Since 1971, the women's basketball team has a combined record of 667–533.

=== Softball ===
The Bearcat softball team appeared in one Women's College World Series in 1975.

== Facilities ==
=== Bearcat Stadium ===
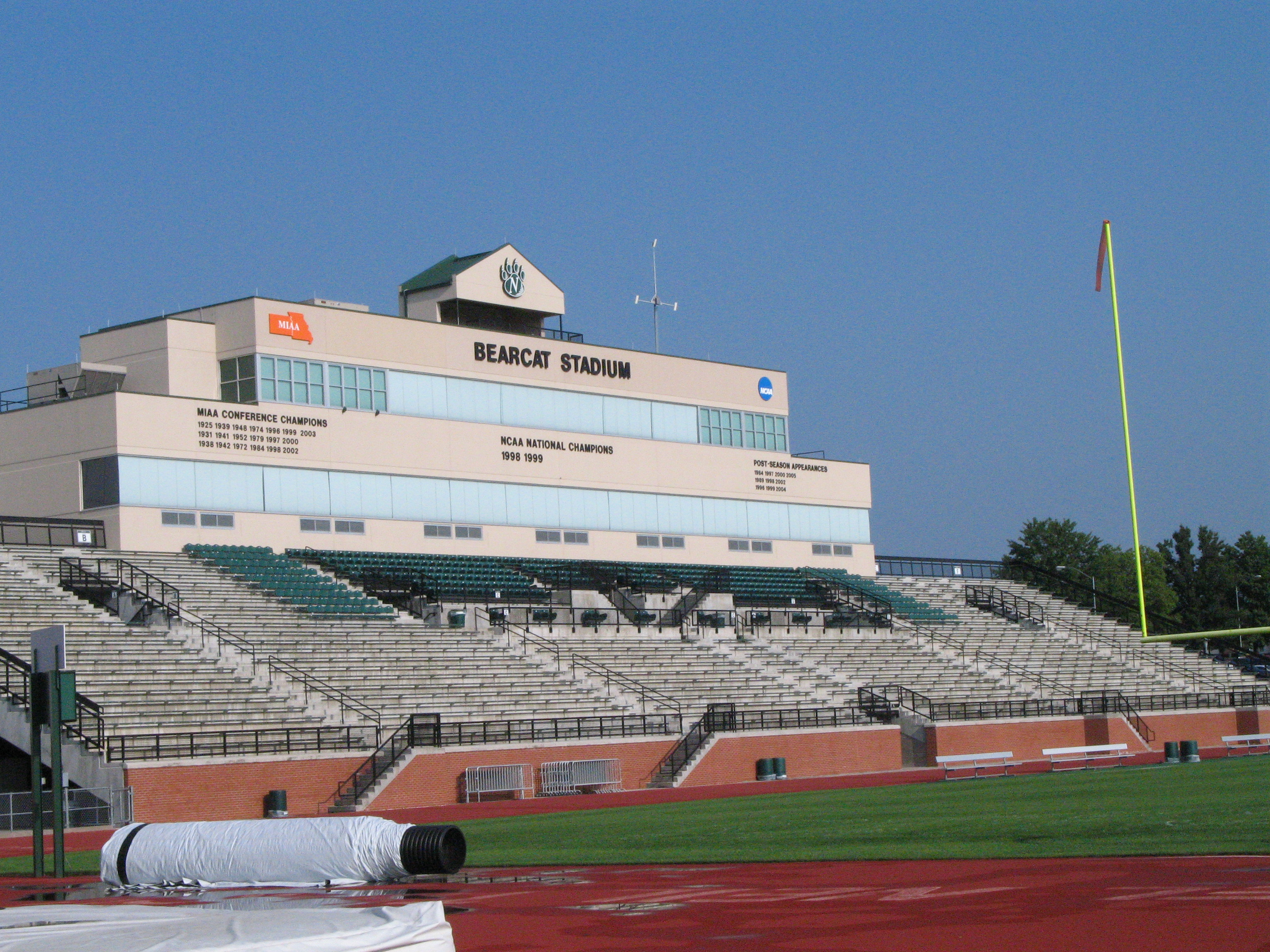
Bearcat Stadium

Bearcat Stadium (formerly "Memorial Stadium" and "Rickenbrode Stadium") is the football stadium of the Northwest Missouri State University Bearcats in Maryville, Missouri and is the oldest continuous site for any NCAA Division II school. The stadium was originally opened in 1917 as Memorial Stadium. It has a capacity of 6,500 and had lights and FieldTurf installed in the summer of 2007.

=== Bearcat Arena ===
The Arena is in Lamkin Activity Center, a part of the Ryland Milner Complex and is located between Bearcat Stadium on the west and the Martindale Gymnasium and the Robert P. Foster Aquatic Center on the east.
