= List of University of Central Missouri people =

The following is a list of notable people associated with the University of Central Missouri, located in the American city of Warrensburg, Missouri.

== Notable alumni ==
=== Politics and government ===
- Rex Barnett (born 1938), politician and former officer of the Missouri State Highway Patrol
- Wallace H. Graham, physician to the president (1945–1953); major general
- James Kirkpatrick, served as 32nd Missouri secretary of state
- Phill Kline, former Kansas attorney general; law professor at Liberty University
- Randy Pike, member of the Missouri House of Representatives
- Darrell Pollock, former member of the Missouri House of Representatives
- James B. Potter Jr., member of the Los Angeles City Council (1963–1971)
- Carl Turner, member of the Kansas House of Representatives

=== Arts and media ===
- Bryan Andrews (dropped out), country singer
- David R. Bunch, author of short stories and poetry who works primarily in science fiction, satire, surrealism, and literary fiction
- Dale Carnegie, author of How to Win Friends and Influence People
- Tolga Çevik, actor from Turkey
- David Cook, 2008 American Idol winner
- Grant Curtis, executive producer of Spider-Man, Spider-Man 2 and Spider-Man 3
- Thomas Hollyman, photojournalist
- David Holsinger, wind ensemble composer
- Allan Kayser, actor who played Bubba Higgins on Mama's Family
- Erich "Mancow" Muller, host of Mancow's Morning Madhouse, a Chicago-based radio show syndicated across the U.S.
- Brian Thomas Smith, actor known for The Big Bang Theory

=== Education ===
- Christopher Bell (1974–2009), scholar, author, and president of the Society for Disability Studies
- Robert P. Foster, president of Northwest Missouri State University 1964–1977
- Lawrence Walkup (1914–2002), president of Northern Arizona University

=== Science and technology ===
- Curtis Cooper, mathematician known for discovering largest known prime number
- Thomas Kunz, researcher notable for insights into bat ecology
- Gregg Miller, inventor of Neuticles and author; 2005 recipient of Ig Nobel Prize for Medicine
- Richard Schelp, mathematician; frequent research collaborator with Paul Erdős
- David Steward, billionaire CEO of World Wide Technology, Inc., the world's largest African American-owned company
- Dean Apostolou, Managing Director of RMT Global, a leading chemical lifecycle software company based in Perth, WA, Australia

=== Sports ===
==== Athletes ====
- Jim Chaney, offensive coordinator for the Tennessee Volunteers
- Mark Curp, former world and American record-holder in the half-marathon
- Zach Davidson, tight end and punter for the Buffalo Bills, drafted in the fifth round of the 2021 NFL draft by the Minnesota Vikings
- Todd Devoe, wide receiver in the NFL and Arena Football League
- Anna Glennon, jet ski racer
- Roderick Green, defensive end and linebacker for the San Francisco 49ers
- Maury John, basketball coach at Drake University (1958–1971) and Iowa State University (1971–1974)
- Vern Kennedy, former pitcher of the Chicago White Sox, best known for throwing the first no-hitter in Comiskey Park
- Toby Korrodi, quarterback signed by the Arizona Cardinals in 2007 and cut in training camp
- Chuck Palumbo, professional wrestler
- Dominick Puni, offensive lineman for the San Francisco 49ers
- Butch "Hacksaw" Reed, professional wrestler
- Jerry Reuss, former pitcher best known for his years with the Los Angeles Dodgers
- Katie Sowers, offensive assistant for the San Francisco 49ers; first openly gay coach in NFL history and first female coach to coach in a Super Bowl
- Ron Tabb, marathon runner
- Delanie Walker, former tight end for the Tennessee Titans
- Colston Weatherington, former NFL and AFL player
- Jeff Wright, former nose tackle for the Buffalo Bills

==== Owners and executives ====
- Russ Ball, NFL executive
- Jim Crane, owner of Houston Astros baseball team

=== Other ===
- Meta Given, entrepreneur, nutritionist, home economist, and author
- Jeffrey Lundgren, self-proclaimed prophet; former leader of a cult group and convicted murderer
- James O. McKinsey, founder of McKinsey & Company
- Carrie Nation, leader of the temperance movement

== Notable faculty ==
- Phog Allen, basketball coach known as the "father of basketball coaching"; spent majority of career at the University of Kansas and namesake of Allen Fieldhouse
- Kim Anderson, head basketball coach of the Missouri Tigers
- Gene Bartow, basketball coach of the UCLA Bruins
- Mildred Barnes, basketball coach 1971–1980, member of the U.S. Olympic Women's Basketball Committee 1965–1972 (chair 1974–1976), inducted into the Women's Basketball Hall of Fame in 2000
- Curtis Cooper, mathematics
- Joe B. Hall, basketball coach of the Kentucky Wildcats
- Christopher Jargocki, physics
- Jim Johnson, associate athletic director (2003 to 2005); current athletic director for Pittsburg State University
- Mike Racy, vice president for law, policy, and strategy (2013–2016); current commissioner of the Mid-America Intercollegiate Athletic Association
