= Merle Zuver =

American football player (1905–1969)

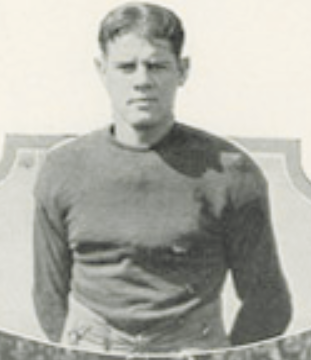
- Zuver in 1927 at Nebraska

No. 14
- Position: Guard

Personal information
- Born: January 25, 1905; Adams, Nebraska, US
- Died: March 25, 1969 (aged 64); Phoenix, Arizona, US
- Listed height: 6 ft 1 in (1.85 m)
- Listed weight: 198 lb (90 kg)

Career information
- High school: Adams (Nebraska)
- College: Nebraska

Career history
- Green Bay Packers (1930)

Awards and highlights
- NFL champion (1930)

Career statistics
- Games played: 10
- Stats at Pro Football Reference

Merle Dale Zuver (January 25, 1905 – March 25, 1969) was an American professional football player who was a guard for the Green Bay Packers of the National Football League (NFL). He played college football for the Nebraska Cornhuskers, where he lettered and was named to the all-conference team. During his only season in the NFL with the Packers in 1930, the team won the NFL Championship. After his career, he was an electrical contractor before retiring to Phoenix, Arizona.

== Early life and college ==
Merle Zuver was born and raised in Adams, Nebraska, where he attended Adams High School. After high school, he went to the University of Nebraska where he lettered for the Nebraska Cornhuskers football for three years from 1926 to 1928. He was also named to the all-conference team for two straight years. He was noted for his speed and aggressiveness on the playing field during his college years.

== Football career ==
After college graduation, Zuver played football for a season with the Ironton Tanks in Ironton, Ohio. He also may have coached football during his time in Ohio. In 1930, he signed on with the Green Bay Packers under head coach Curly Lambeau. During the 1930 season, he played ten games for the Packers, starting in five of them. The Packers finished the season with a record of 10–3–1, earning them their second consecutive championship.

== Personal life ==
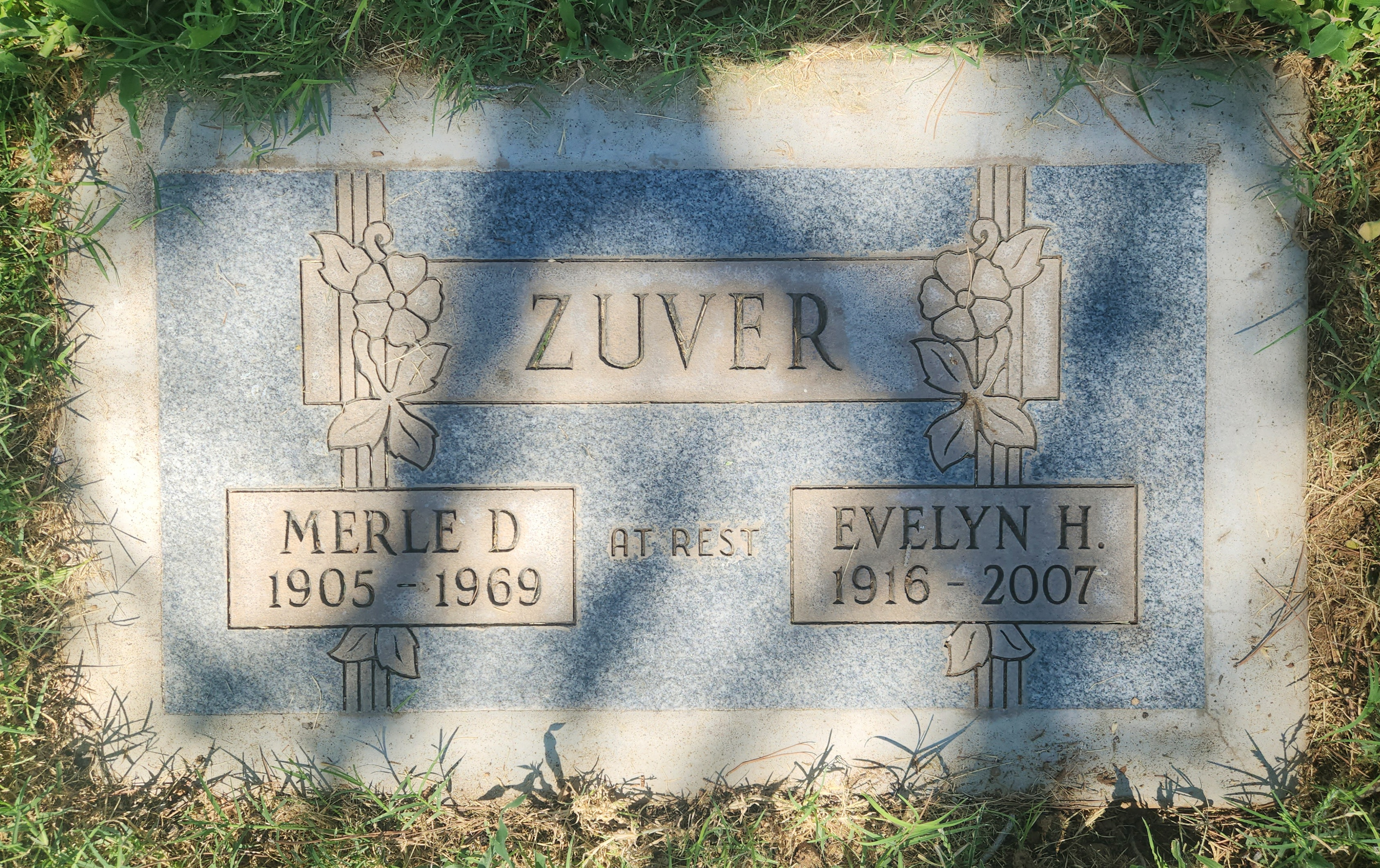
Zuver and his wife's headstone in Phoenix

After his football career, Zuver moved to Portland, Oregon, and worked as an electrical contractor. He retired in 1959 and moved to Phoenix, Arizona. Zuver married once but did not have any children. He died on March 25, 1969, at the age of 64.
