= Marc Boerigter =

American gridiron football player (born 1978)

No. 89, 85
- Position: Wide receiver

Personal information
- Born: May 4, 1978 (age 48); Hastings, Nebraska, U.S.
- Listed height: 6 ft 3 in (1.91 m)
- Listed weight: 220 lb (100 kg)

Career information
- College: Hastings College
- NFL draft: 2000: undrafted

Career history
- Calgary Stampeders (2000–2001); Kansas City Chiefs (2002–2005); Green Bay Packers (2006)*; Indianapolis Colts (2006)*; Calgary Stampeders (2007); Toronto Argonauts (2007)
- * Offseason or practice squad member only

Awards and highlights
- Grey Cup champion (2001); CFL All-Star (2001); NFL record: Longest receiving touchdown: 99 yards (tied)

Career NFL statistics
- Receptions: 39
- Receiving yards: 697
- Receiving touchdowns: 8
- Stats at Pro Football Reference

Career CFL statistics
- Receptions: 133
- Receiving yards: 2,346
- Touchdowns: 20

Marc Robert Boerigter (/ˈbɔːrɪktər/; born May 4, 1978) is an American former professional football player. Boerigter had stints in both the Canadian Football League (CFL) and the National Football League (NFL). He is one of 13 players to have caught a 99-yard reception in the NFL.

== Early life and college ==
Born in Hastings, Nebraska, Boerigter attended Hastings High School. He played college football for hometown Hastings College, an NAIA school. As a wide receiver for the Broncos, Boerigter caught 93 passes for 1,902 yards during his collegiate career, setting team records with a 20.5 yard average and 30 touchdowns. Boerigter was named a two-time All-Nebraska-Iowa Athletic Conference selection.

Boerigter graduated from Hastings with a bachelor's degree in Human Resources.

His father is Bob Boerigter, who served as the Mid-America Intercollegiate Athletics Association commissioner from 2010 to 2017.

== Professional career ==
Boerigter began his professional career in the Canadian Football League in 2000 with the Calgary Stampeders.

Boerigter joined the Kansas City Chiefs of the National Football League in 2002, where he enjoyed a successful NFL rookie season, catching 20 passes for 420 yards (a 21.0 average that led the NFL among those with 15 or more catches) with eight touchdowns. He also holds the record, along with twelve other receivers, for the longest pass caught in the NFL, 99 yards, from Kansas City quarterback Trent Green, in a December 22, 2002 game against the San Diego Chargers. Boerigter missed the entire 2004 regular season after sustaining a knee injury during preseason, he made a return to the lineup in 2005.

Boerigter was signed by the Green Bay Packers in the 2006 offseason, but was released prior to the start of the season. He immediately signed a free agent contract with the Indianapolis Colts but was once again released prior to the start of the 2006 NFL season.

Following his release from the Colts, Boerigter signed a contract and returned to his former CFL team, the Calgary Stampeders on November 20, 2006.

Boerigter began the Stampeders 2007 season as a back-up slotback and wide receiver, before eventually making the Stamps' starting lineup. Boerigter was released by the Calgary Stampeders on August 26, 2007.

Following his release by the Stampeders, Boerigter was quickly signed by the Toronto Argonauts, who outbid the competing BC Lions for Boerigter's services. Toronto released him following the 2007 season and he was not signed as a free agent in 2008.

Boerigter was inducted into the Hastings College Athletic Hall of Fame in 2008.

== Post-football career ==
In September 2015, Boerigter accepted a job offer from the Mid-America Intercollegiate Athletic Association, an NCAA Division II conference, to do color commentary.
