= Hastings Public Schools =

Hastings Public Schools may refer to:

- Hastings Public Schools (Minnesota)
- Hastings Public Schools (Nebraska)
