= Ralph McFillen =

Former American National Collegiate Athletic Association conference commissioner

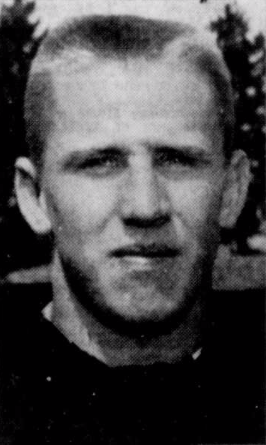
- McFillen in 1963

2nd Commissioner of the Mid-America Intercollegiate Athletics Association
- In office July 1, 1997 – June 30, 2007
- Preceded by: Ken B. Jones
- Succeeded by: Jim Johnson

Commissioner of the Metro Conference
- In office September 1, 1987 – June 30, 1995
- Preceded by: Steve Hatchell
- Succeeded by: conference dissolved

3rd Commissioner of the Gulf South Conference
- In office July 1, 1984 – August 31, 1987
- Preceded by: Hayden Riley
- Succeeded by: Sonny Moran

Personal details
- Born: 1942 (age 83–84) Belleville, Kansas, U.S.
- Spouse: Pat McFillen
- Education: Kansas State University

Ralph McFillen (born 1942) is a former American National Collegiate Athletic Association conference commissioner. McFillen, before retiring in 2007, served as the commissioner for the Mid-America Intercollegiate Athletics Association (MIAA), an NCAA Division II conference since 1997. Before serving as the MIAA commissioner, McFillen was the commissioner for Metro Conference and Gulf South Conference.

== Career ==
=== Early career ===
After graduating from Belleville High School in 1960, McFillen attended Kansas State University where he played on the football team. McFillen graduated from Kansas State in 1964 with a bachelor's degree in history and physical education, and a master's degree in education in 1967. In 1972, McFillen began his forty-year career in athletics as an assistant director of championships at the NCAA.

=== Commissioner years ===
In 1984, 12 years after working at the MIAA, McFillen became the commissioner for the Gulf South Conference, an NCAA Division II conference. After three years, McFillen moved to the NCAA Division I level as the next commissioner for the now-defunct conference, the Metro Conference. While at Metro Conference, McFillen faced many obstacles, such as trying to expand the "super conference". McFillen was the final commissioner for the conference when it dissolved in 1995.

Two years after the falling-out of the Metro Conference, McFillen was hired to replace Ken B. Jones as the second commissioner for the Mid-America Intercollegiate Athletics Association, an NCAA Division II school. While his time as commissioner, McFillen first was able to secure a contract to air five football games on KSMO-TV in the Kansas City area in 1997. All games were on Thursday nights. Other accomplishments during McFillen's term as commissioner were an addition of two schools – Fort Hays State University in 2006 and University of Nebraska Omaha in 2008.

In 2007, after 10 years in the MIAA and 40-plus years in collegiate athletics, McFillen retired.
