= Hastings Senior High School =

Hastings Senior High School can refer to:

- Hastings Senior High School (Nebraska) in Hastings, Nebraska
- Hastings Senior High School (Minnesota) in Hastings, Minnesota
