= Bob Boerigter =

American sports administrator

4th commissioner of the Mid-America Intercollegiate Athletics Association
- In office September 20, 2010 – January 31, 2017
- Preceded by: Jim Johnson
- Succeeded by: Mike Racy

Director of Athletics for Northwest Missouri State University
- In office May 2001 – September 2010
- Succeeded by: Wren Baker

Personal details
- Spouse: Mary Boerigter
- Children: Marc Boerigter; John Boerigter
- Education: Northwestern College (Iowa); University of Northern Colorado; University of Utah

Robert Boerigter is an American sports administrator and retired commissioner for the Mid-America Intercollegiate Athletics Association. Prior to being commissioner, Boerigter served as the athletics director for Northwest Missouri State University.

== Early years ==
Boerigter attended Northwestern College in Iowa where he earned his bachelor's degree in 1970. Boerigter then moved to Colorado, where he graduated from the University of Northern Colorado with a master of arts in 1974, and his PhD from the University of Utah in 1978. In 1972, Boerigter began his 45-year career in collegiate athletics as a coach at Northwestern College in four different sports.

== Career ==
From 1972 to 1988, Boerigter had served as athletics director at three different institutions: Adams State College, Northwestern College and Whitworth College. In July 1988, Boerigter began his 13-year career at Hastings College as the athletics director. While at Hastings, Boerigter more than doubled the size of student athletes, as he established four new programs: baseball, softball, women's golf, and men's and women's soccer.

In May 2001, Boerigter began as the athletics director for Northwest Missouri State University. While at Northwest Missouri State, Boerigter was the leader for the then-Fall Classic at Arrowhead, and oversaw renovations to the football stadium. In September 2010, it was announced that Boerigter would become the fourth Mid-America Intercollegiate Athletics Association commissioner.

While serving as commissioner of the MIAA, Boerigter oversaw conference expansion in 2012, 10 schools won a national championship, and brought the NCAA Division II Football Championship to Kansas City in 2014 for three seasons. In May 2016, Boerigter announced he would retire on January 27, 2017, after six years as commissioner.

== Personal life ==
Boerigter has two children. His son Marc Boerigter played professional football from 2000–07, including four seasons in the NFL with the Kansas City Chiefs from 2002-05. This coincided with Boerigter's time at Northwest Missouri State University in Maryville, MO, about 100 miles (160 km) north of the Kansas City. In 2015 Marc accepted a job as a color commentator for the MIAA, while his father was commissioner.
