= Hastings, Nebraska =

City in and county seat of Adams County, Nebraska, United States

- City
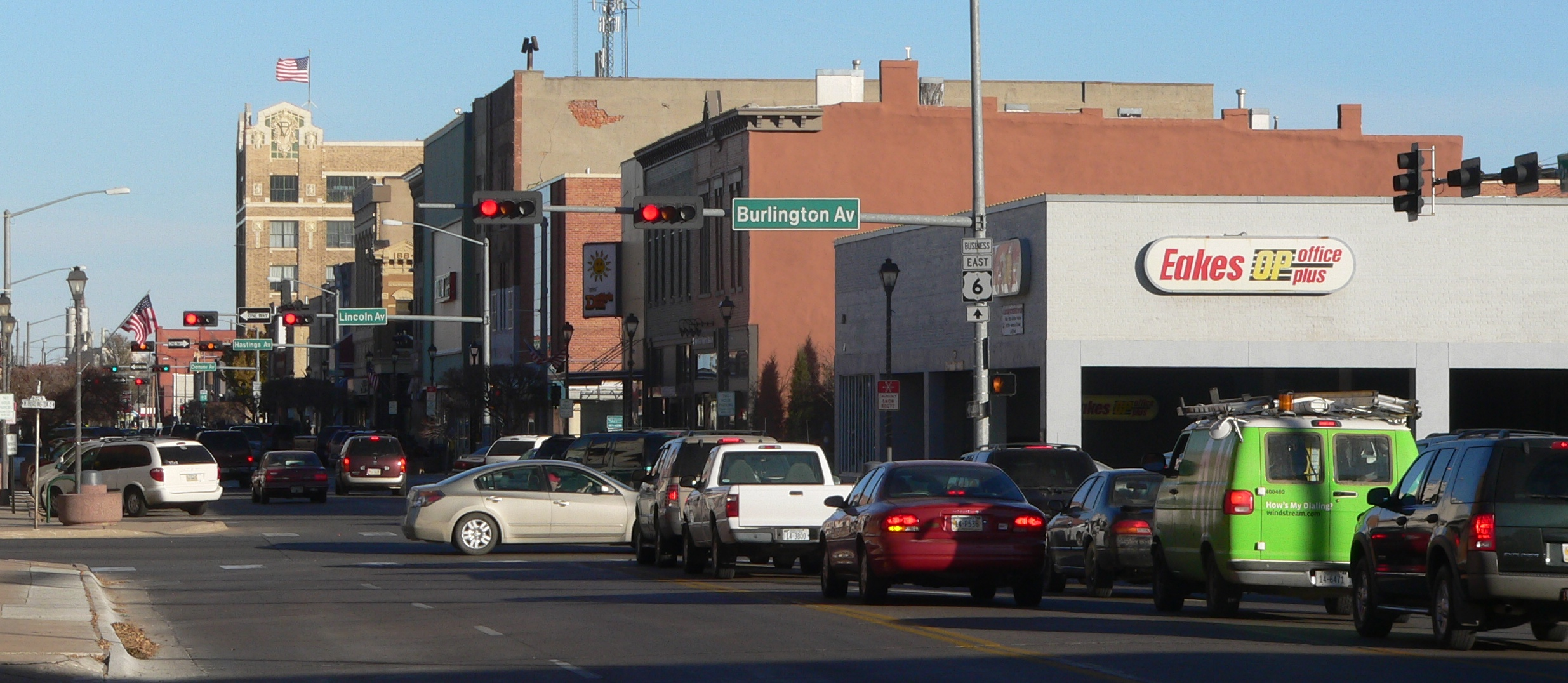
- Downtown Hastings: 2nd Street, looking eastward, November 2012

- Flag Logo

- Location within Adams and Nebraska

- Location in the United States
- Coordinates: 40°35′46″N 98°23′24″W
- Country: United States
- State: Nebraska
- County: Adams
- Founded: 1872
- Incorporated: 1874

Area
  - Total: 15.05 sq mi (38.97 km^{2})
  - Land: 14.87 sq mi (38.51 km^{2})
  - Water: 0.18 sq mi (0.46 km^{2})
- Elevation: 1,926 ft (587 m)

Population (2020)
  - Total: 25,152
  - Density: 1,691.5/sq mi (653.09/km^{2})
- Time zone: UTC-06:00 (CST)
  - Summer (DST): UTC-05:00 (CDT)
- ZIP codes: 68901-68902
- Area code: 402
- FIPS code: 31-21415
- GNIS ID: 838051
- Website: cityofhastings.org

Hastings is a city in and the county seat of Adams County, Nebraska, United States. The population was 25,152 at the 2020 census, making it the 8th most populous city in Nebraska.

Edwin Perkins invented Kool-Aid in Hastings in 1927; the town celebrates the invention with the Kool-Aid Days festival every August.

During World War II, Hastings operated the largest Naval Ammunition Depot in the United States, and for this reason was awarded the distinction of American World War II Heritage City by the National Park Service in 2023.

== History ==
=== Settlement ===
Hastings was founded in 1872 at the intersection of the Burlington and Missouri River Railroad and the St. Joseph and Denver City Railroad. It was named for Colonel D. T. Hastings of the St. Joseph and Grand Island Railroad, who was instrumental in building the railroad through Adams County. The area was previously open plain: the Donner Party passed through on its way to California in 1846 and a pioneer cemetery marker in Hastings bears an inscription taken from Tamsen Donner's journal: "The country between the Blue and the Platte is beautiful beyond compare. Never have I seen so varied a country so suitable to cultivation." In the 1870s, railroads lured European immigrants to the new state of Nebraska with advertisements. Hastings' first settlers were English, from Liverpool, and were quickly joined by other English, Irish, Germans, Danes, and Germans from Russia, along with settlers from Midwestern and Northeastern states.

Between 1872 and 1880, when the population had grown to 2,800, Hastings was a boomtown. Settlers first built sod houses, dugouts, and shanties, then houses and stores. The city was incorporated in April 1874, and in September 1878, after a five-year county seat war, the county seat was transferred to Hastings from Juniata. However, a fire in 1879 destroyed 33 buildings downtown. The city was rebuilt between 1880 and 1890 in fireproof materials and in a more planned fashion, with characteristically ornate Victorian buildings, many designed by Charles C. Rittenhouse, the first practicing architect in Adams County and also mayor for ten years. Thanks to the railroads, the city enjoyed great prosperity during the Gilded Age. The population grew to 13,500. This period of expansion ended with the drought and agricultural depression of the 1890s; the town's population fell to 7,000 and would not reach 15,000 until 1930.

African Americans have lived in Hastings since the 1860s. In 1876, Horace G. Newsom started the first Black-owned newspaper in Nebraska.

=== 20th century ===
Hastings saw renewed growth from 1900 to 1930, which is reflected by buildings in the Craftsman, Prairie, Colonial Revival, and American Foursquare styles. The leading Arts and Crafts architect was Claude W. Way. Hastings had four brickyards and in 1911 was producing more bricks than any other city in Nebraska, and all the paving bricks. During this period, the city also became known as the cigar-making capital of Nebraska. The largest cigar factory, the Kipp Cigar Company, was by 1921 hand-rolling one-fifth of all cigars produced in Nebraska; in 1925 it produced half, a total of 10 million. Cigars lost their popularity to cigarettes between the two World Wars, and in the 1930s the Great Depression again brought the town's expansion to a halt.

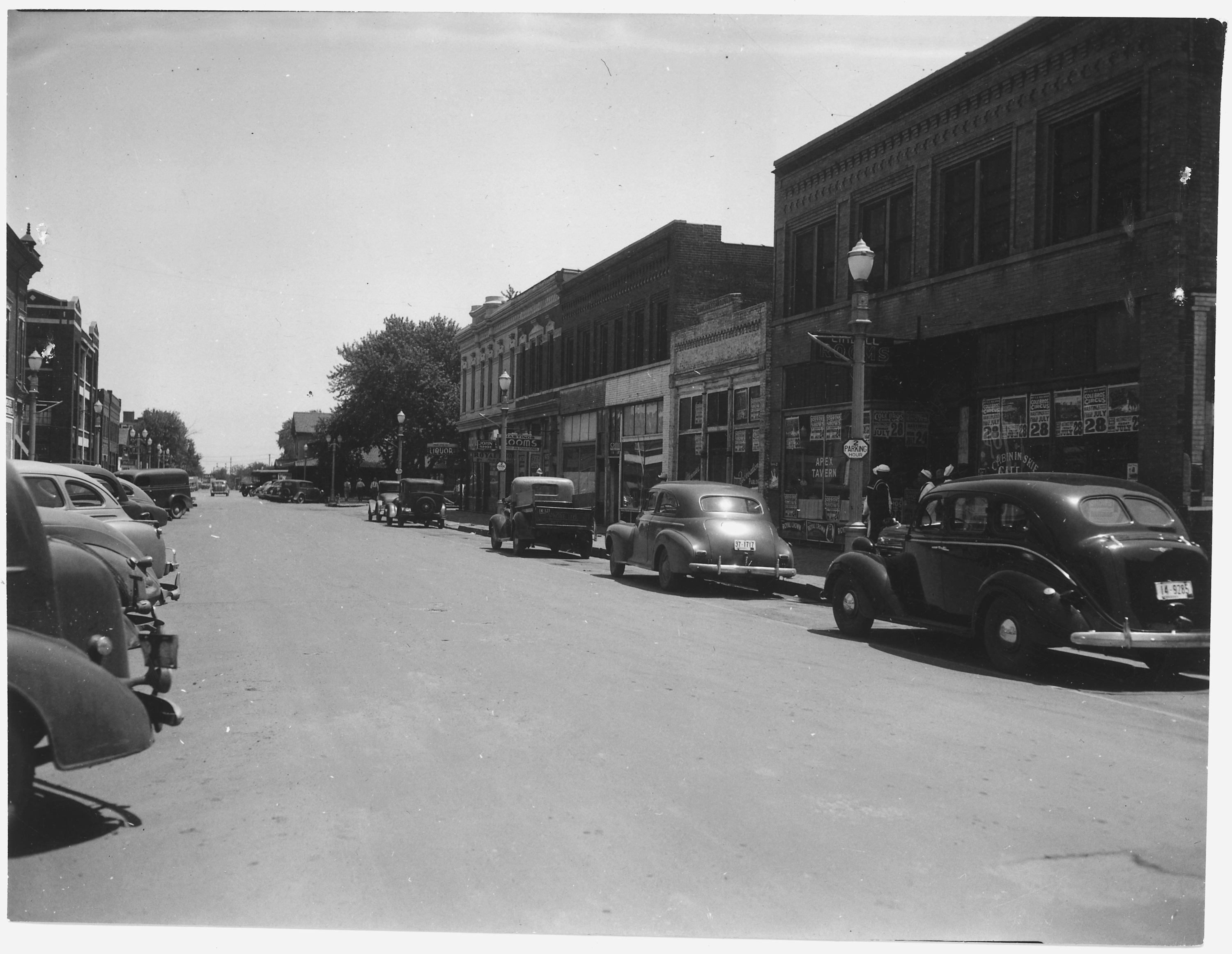
Looking east on First Street, circa 1944

In 1942, the Naval Ammunition Depot (NAD) was constructed, initiating explosive growth: Hastings' population grew from 15,000 to 23,000 in under a year and there was a critical shortage of housing, which prompted both alteration of existing housing stock and rapid construction of new neighborhoods. Once World War II ended, staff was reduced at the ammunition depot, bringing Hastings' last growth period to an end in 1950, and the depot eventually closed. The NAD also significantly increased the city's African American population, which went from 70 Black residents in 1940 to more than 1,000 by 1943.

Kool-Aid was invented by Edwin Perkins in Hastings. All of his experiments took place in his mother's kitchen. Its predecessor was a liquid concentrate called Fruit Smack. To reduce shipping costs, in 1927, Perkins discovered a way to remove the liquid from Fruit Smack, leaving only a powder; this powder was named Kool-Aid. Perkins moved his production to Chicago in 1931 and Kool-Aid was sold to General Foods in 1953. Hastings still celebrates a yearly summer festival called Kool-Aid Days on the second weekend in August in honor of their city's claim to fame. Kool-Aid is known as Nebraska's official soft drink.

=== 21st century ===
Today, Heartwell Park and Central Hastings, two of the oldest neighborhoods, are listed on the National Register of Historic Places. The Hastings Symphony Orchestra performs in the Chautauqua Pavilion, built in 1907 and on the National Register of Historic Places, while the Hastings Community Theatre performs in the auditorium of the former Spencer Park School, built during the housing shortage of the 1940s. The city has adapted several of its historic buildings to new uses. Central Community College is housed in buildings of the former Naval Ammunition Depot. St. Michael's Elementary School (formerly the Lincoln Elementary School building), built in 1912, is now the police headquarters. The Clarke Hotel, built in 1914 and also on the National Register of Historic Places, is now the Kensington, a home for senior citizens. Spencer Park, an 840-unit "village" built to house workers in the 1940s, is now Good Samaritan Retirement Village.

In 2000, there were 200 African Americans living in Adams County, with almost all living in Hastings. According to the U.S. Census, in 2022 African Americans comprise .6% of the city's population.{{cite web |url= https://www.census.gov/quickfacts/hastingscitynebraska#qf-headnote-a |title= QuickFacts Hastings city, Nebraska |last=

On June 24, 2007, Hastings won Yahoo's Greenest City in America competition.

== Geography ==
According to the United States Census Bureau, the city has a total area of 13.66 square miles (35.38 km^{2}), of which 13.48 square miles (34.91 km^{2}) is land and 0.18 square miles (0.47 km^{2}) is water.

=== Climate ===
A National Weather Service Forecast Office is located in Hastings, serving central and south-central Nebraska and six counties in north-central Kansas. The data below are from the WRCC.

Hastings has a humid continental climate (Dfa) with short, cold, and snowy winters and hot, rainy summers with mild nights.

Climate data for Hastings, Nebraska (1991–2020 normals, extremes 1894–present)
Month	Jan	Feb	Mar	Apr	May	Jun	Jul	Aug	Sep	Oct	Nov	Dec	Year
Record high °F (°C)	76 (24)	80 (27)	90 (32)	96 (36)	105 (41)	110 (43)	116 (47)	111 (44)	105 (41)	97 (36)	86 (30)	80 (27)	116 (47)
Mean maximum °F (°C)	59.5 (15.3)	65.2 (18.4)	76.7 (24.8)	85.2 (29.6)	91.4 (33.0)	96.6 (35.9)	99.1 (37.3)	96.9 (36.1)	93.4 (34.1)	86.1 (30.1)	73.6 (23.1)	60.8 (16.0)	100.4 (38.0)
Mean daily maximum °F (°C)	35.9 (2.2)	40.3 (4.6)	52.6 (11.4)	62.8 (17.1)	72.9 (22.7)	83.5 (28.6)	87.4 (30.8)	85.0 (29.4)	78.5 (25.8)	65.2 (18.4)	50.6 (10.3)	38.5 (3.6)	62.7 (17.1)
Daily mean °F (°C)	25.7 (−3.5)	29.5 (−1.4)	40.4 (4.7)	50.5 (10.3)	61.5 (16.4)	72.2 (22.3)	76.4 (24.7)	73.8 (23.2)	66.1 (18.9)	52.8 (11.6)	39.2 (4.0)	28.5 (−1.9)	51.3 (10.7)
Mean daily minimum °F (°C)	15.4 (−9.2)	18.7 (−7.4)	28.2 (−2.1)	38.2 (3.4)	50.1 (10.1)	60.8 (16.0)	65.3 (18.5)	62.9 (17.2)	53.7 (12.1)	40.5 (4.7)	27.8 (−2.3)	18.6 (−7.4)	40.0 (4.4)
Mean minimum °F (°C)	−5.8 (−21.0)	−1.3 (−18.5)	8.3 (−13.2)	22.9 (−5.1)	35.3 (1.8)	49.1 (9.5)	54.8 (12.7)	52.3 (11.3)	38.7 (3.7)	23.1 (−4.9)	10.4 (−12.0)	−0.9 (−18.3)	−10.3 (−23.5)
Record low °F (°C)	−30 (−34)	−30 (−34)	−15 (−26)	5 (−15)	22 (−6)	34 (1)	45 (7)	40 (4)	26 (−3)	4 (−16)	−7 (−22)	−23 (−31)	−30 (−34)
Average precipitation inches (mm)	0.61 (15)	0.80 (20)	1.36 (35)	2.98 (76)	4.48 (114)	3.74 (95)	3.58 (91)	3.37 (86)	2.16 (55)	1.97 (50)	1.21 (31)	0.86 (22)	26.54 (674)
Average snowfall inches (cm)	6.8 (17)	7.5 (19)	3.8 (9.7)	1.7 (4.3)	0.0 (0.0)	0.0 (0.0)	0.0 (0.0)	0.0 (0.0)	0.0 (0.0)	1.1 (2.8)	2.3 (5.8)	5.6 (14)	28.4 (72)
Average precipitation days (≥ 0.01 in.)	5.3	5.6	7.3	9.2	12.2	10.2	8.9	9.7	7.0	6.9	5.2	5.1	91.0
Average snowy days (≥ 0.1 in.)	4.6	4.7	2.8	1.1	0.1	0.0	0.0	0.0	0.0	0.5	1.8	4.1	19.7
Source: NOAA

== Demographics ==
Historical population
Census	Pop.	Note	%±
1880	2,817		—
1890	13,584		382.2%
1900	7,188		−47.1%
1910	9,338		29.9%
1920	11,647		24.7%
1930	15,490		33.0%
1940	15,145		−2.2%
1950	20,211		33.4%
1960	21,412		5.9%
1970	23,580		10.1%
1980	23,045		−2.3%
1990	22,837		−0.9%
2000	24,064		5.4%
2010	24,907		3.5%
2020	25,152		1.0%
U.S. Decennial Census

Hastings is the principal city of the Hastings, Nebraska Micropolitan Statistical Area, which consists of Adams and Clay counties.

=== 2020 census ===
As of the 2020 census, Hastings had a population of 25,152. There were 10,333 households and 6,139 families, and the population density was 1,691.5 per square mile (653.1/km^{2}).

The median age was 36.7 years. 23.7% of residents were under the age of 18 and 18.2% were 65 years of age or older; 13.0% were between 18 and 24, 22.6% were from 25 to 44, and 22.8% were from 45 to 64. For every 100 females there were 95.9 males, and for every 100 females age 18 and over there were 94.5 males age 18 and over.

98.6% of residents lived in urban areas, while 1.4% lived in rural areas.

Of the 10,333 households, 28.6% had children under the age of 18 living in them. Of all households, 43.7% were married-couple households, 19.9% were households with a male householder and no spouse or partner present, and 29.2% were households with a female householder and no spouse or partner present. About 34.0% of all households were made up of individuals and 15.4% had someone living alone who was 65 years of age or older.

There were 11,279 housing units, of which 8.4% were vacant. The homeowner vacancy rate was 1.5% and the rental vacancy rate was 8.2%.

Racial composition as of the 2020 census
Race	Number	Percent
White	20,917	83.2%
Black or African American	250	1.0%
American Indian and Alaska Native	167	0.7%
Asian	408	1.6%
Native Hawaiian and Other Pacific Islander	9	0.0%
Some other race	1,480	5.9%
Two or more races	1,921	7.6%
Hispanic or Latino (of any race)	3,479	13.8%

=== 2016–2020 American Community Survey ===
The 2016–2020 5-year American Community Survey estimates show that the median household income was $52,747 (with a margin of error of +/- $3,112) and the median family income $72,458 (+/- $6,758). Males had a median income of $36,612 (+/- $2,682) versus $22,994 (+/- $2,354) for females. The median income for those above 16 years old was $29,221 (+/- $1,883). Approximately, 9.4% of families and 13.9% of the population were below the poverty line, including 18.4% of those under the age of 18 and 8.5% of those ages 65 or over.

=== 2010 census ===
As of the census of 2010, there were 24,907 people, 10,110 households, and 6,160 families residing in the city. The population density was 1,847.7 inhabitants per square mile (713.4/km^{2}). There were 10,847 housing units at an average density of 804.7 per square mile (310.7/km^{2}). The racial makeup of the city was 90.4% White, 1.0% African American, 0.5% Native American, 1.7% Asian, 0.1% Pacific Islander, 5.0% from other races, and 1.5% from two or more races. Hispanic or Latino of any race were 9.8% of the population.

There were 10,110 households, of which 29.6% had children under the age of 18 living with them, 46.2% were married couples living together, 10.5% had a female householder with no husband present, 4.2% had a male householder with no wife present, and 39.1% were non-families. 32.7% of all households were made up of individuals, and 14.3% had someone living alone who was 65 years of age or older. The average household size was 2.35 and the average family size was 2.97.

The median age in the city was 36.8 years. 23.9% of residents were under the age of 18; 12.4% were between the ages of 18 and 24; 22.8% were from 25 to 44; 25.1% were from 45 to 64; and 15.8% were 65 years of age or older. The gender makeup of the city was 49.4% male and 50.6% female.

=== 2000 census ===
As of the census of 2000, there were 24,064 people, 9,610 households, and 5,948 families residing in the city. The population density was 2,448.5 inhabitants per square mile (945.4/km^{2}). There were 10,333 housing units at an average density of 1,051.4 per square mile (405.9/km^{2}). The racial makeup of the city was 93.39% White, 0.79% African American, 0.42% Native American, 2.02% Asian, 0.04% Pacific Islander, 2.39% from other races, and 0.96% from two or more races. Hispanic or Latino of any race were 5.58% of the population.

There were 9,610 households, out of which 29.6% had children under the age of 18 living with them, 49.8% were married couples living together, 9.2% had a female householder with no husband present, and 38.1% were non-families. 31.5% of all households were made up of individuals, and 14.2% had someone living alone who was 65 years of age or older. The average household size was 2.36 and the average family size was 2.98.

In the city, the population was spread out, with 23.6% under the age of 18, 12.8% from 18 to 24, 26.5% from 25 to 44, 20.5% from 45 to 64, and 16.7% who were 65 years of age or older. The median age was 36 years. For every 100 females, there were 93.7 males. For every 100 females age 18 and over, there were 90.1 males.

As of 2000 the median income for a household in the city was $35,461, and the median income for a family was $44,688. Males had a median income of $29,633 versus $21,262 for females. The per capita income for the city was $17,941. About 5.6% of families and 10.0% of the population were below the poverty line, including 10.6% of those under age 18 and 6.7% of those age 65 or over.

== Transportation ==
Amtrak, the national passenger rail system, provides service at station in Hastings, operating its California Zephyr daily in each direction between Chicago and Emeryville, California, across the bay from San Francisco. Hastings is served by major highways, including east-west U.S. Highways 6 and 34, and north-south U.S. Highway 281. Burlington Avenue is the main street running from south to north in Hastings; northward it leads to U.S. 281. Hastings is approximately 14 miles (23 km) south of Interstate 80.

Hastings Municipal Airport is owned and operated by the City of Hastings.

== Education ==
The school district is the Hastings Public Schools.

Hastings has several elementary schools. The largest public elementary is Alcott. Others include Hawthorne, Watson, and Lincoln. Zion Classical Academy serves students in grades Preschool–8. There was a new middle school that opened in the fall of 2008. The high schools are Hastings High School (public) Athletics Class B and St. Cecilia's (Catholic) Athletics class C–2.

Just outside town is Adams Central Junior-Senior High School (public rural) Athletics Class C.

Hastings College is a private liberal arts college, affiliated with the Presbyterian Church (USA), and founded in 1882. Central Community College, a two-year technical college, began serving students in 1966, and it occupies the site of the old Naval Ammunition Depot.

== Special locations and features ==
=== Fisher Fountain ===
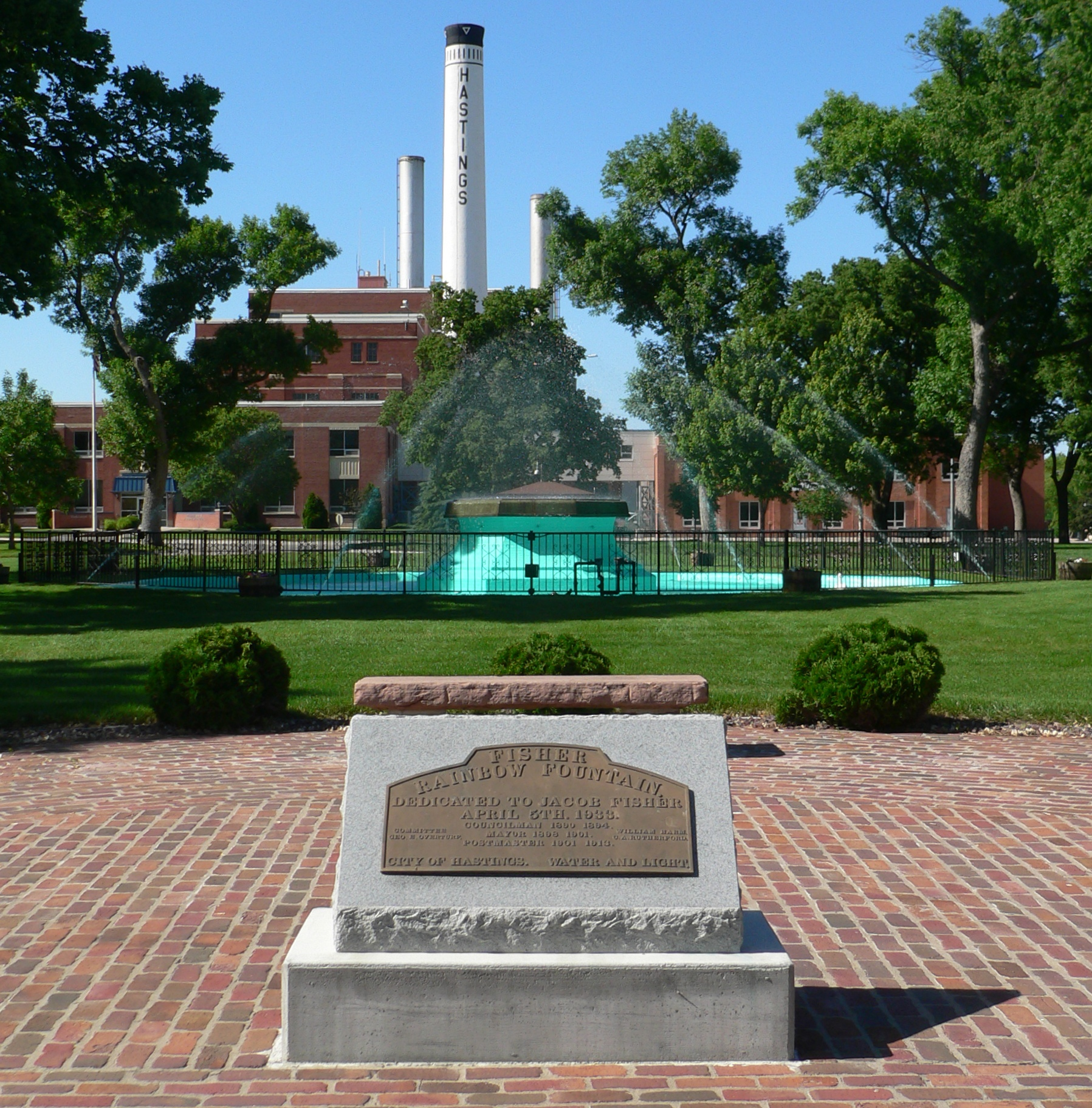
Fisher Rainbow Fountain; in the background is the Hastings Utilities complex (2010)

The Jacob Fisher Rainbow Fountain in Highland Park shoots continuously changing arrays of water jets (reaching heights of 67 feet) while green, yellow, orange, red, magenta, and blue lights illuminate the water in varying patterns.

Fisher Fountain was originally a temporary exhibit at the 1932 Adams County Fair, called the Electric Fountain. It was invented by Edward R. Howard and became a symbol of hope during the Great Depression and Dust Bowl. Because of its popularity, it was moved to the park and made permanent. A competition among schoolchildren to rename it resulted in two winning names that were combined: Rainbow Fountain, and Fisher Fountain after Mayor Jacob Fisher. According to Spilinek, it was set up on the grounds of Hastings Utilities.

Fisher Fountain was renovated in 1982 but was then dynamited by vandals in 1984. Its destruction aroused a strong community response. $63,000 was raised to rebuild it, and it was rededicated on Mother's Day in 1985.

=== Hastings Museum ===
The Hastings Museum of Natural and Cultural History is in an art deco building funded by $75,000 from the Works Progress Administration and completed in 1939. Albert Brooking, who founded the museum in 1926 and provided it with many exhibits, including Indian relics, fossils, and the largest private collection of mounted birds in the US, was buried in the basement in 1946. The museum currently houses the Lied Super Screen Theatre, McDonald Planetarium, and local and regional exhibits including the largest diorama of whooping and sandhill cranes in the world. The Adams County Historical Society is located within the museum.

=== Naval Ammunition Depot ===
The Naval Ammunition Depot, constructed on 49,000 acres (200 km^{2}) southeast of Hastings and in operation from 1942 to 1946, was the largest United States World War II naval munitions plant, encompassing over 2,200 structures valued at $71 million. Hastings was chosen as the location for the plant because of its central location. In 1945 it employed 6,692 civilians in addition to 125 officers and 1,800 enlistees.

The plant was reactivated in the Korean War but decommissioned between 1958 and 1966, and the site now houses a US Department of Agriculture research station, training facilities for the National Guard and Reserves, an industrial park, Central Community College, and a golf course.

== Parks and recreation ==
Hastings has twenty parks and recreational facilities throughout the city. The city offers recreational and leisure programs and operates the Aquacourt Water Park, the City Auditorium, Lake Hastings, Chautauqua Pavilion, Duncan Field, the Pioneer Spirit Trail, Smith Softball Complex, Brickyard Park Amphitheater, and Heartwell Lake.

== Media ==
The principal newspaper in Hastings is the Hastings Tribune, published six days a week.

KNHL's studio is located north of Hastings on U.S. 281.

== Notable people ==
- Marc Boerigter, football player
- Stan Campbell, football player
- James F. Capalino, businessperson
- Adam Carriker, football player
- Clarence L. "Ben" Coates, computer scientist
- Dorothy Weyer Creigh, Nebraska historian
- Sandy Dennis, theater and Academy Award-winning film actress
- Charles Henry Dietrich, Governor of Nebraska and U.S. Senator
- Stephen Goodin, football player
- Robert Keith Gray, influential Republican public relations specialist
- Francis Greenlief, United States Army Major General and Chief of the National Guard Bureau
- Neal Hefti, jazz musician and composer
- Sheila Hicks, fiber artist
- Johnny Hopp, Major League baseball player
- Rollin Kirby, political cartoonist
- Gwen Lee, stage and film actress
- Les Nunamaker, Major League baseball player
- Tom Osborne, Nebraska football coach and Congressman
- Edwin Perkins, inventor of Kool-Aid
- Randall Ray Rader, former Chief Judge of the United States Court of Appeals for the Federal Circuit.
- Carrie Renfrew (1858–1948), author
- Fred A. Seaton, U.S. Secretary of the Interior 1956–1961.
- Rick Sheehy, lieutenant governor of Nebraska 2005–2013
- Teddi Smith, Playboy Playmate (July 1960)
- Zach Sterup, football player
- Jeri Kehn Thompson, political commentator, wife of Sen. Fred Thompson
- Gerald Lee Warren, journalist

== See also ==
- List of municipalities in Nebraska
- National Register of Historic Places listings in Adams County, Nebraska
- Andy, the footless goose
