= Stephen Goodin =

American football player (born 1988)

No. 63
- Position: Offensive guard

Personal information
- Born: August 25, 1988 (age 38); Hastings, Nebraska, U.S.
- Listed height: 6 ft 6 in (1.98 m)
- Listed weight: 310 lb (141 kg)

Career information
- High school: Hastings
- College: Nebraska-Kearney (2007–2011)
- NFL draft: 2012: undrafted

Career history
- New York Giants (2012–2013); Dallas Cowboys (2014)*; Minnesota Vikings (2015)*; Brooklyn Bolts (2015)
- * Offseason or practice squad member only
- Stats at Pro Football Reference

Stephen Goodin (born August 25, 1988) is an American former professional football offensive guard who played for the New York Giants of the National Football League (NFL). He played college football at the University of Nebraska at Kearney.

== Early life ==
Goodin played high school football at Hastings Senior High School in Hastings, Nebraska, earning All-state honors as a tight end.

== College career ==
Goodin played for the Nebraska-Kearney Lopers from 2007 to 2011. He was redshirted in 2006 and medically redshirted in 2010. He earned honorable mention Academic All-Rocky Mountain Athletic Conference honors in 2007 and first-team Academic All-RMAC recognition in 2008. Goodin also garnered second-team All-RMAC, second-team Academic All-District and first-team Academic All-RMAC accolades in 2009. He earned first-team All-RMAC recognition and was team co-caption in 2011.

== Professional career ==
Pre-draft measurables
Height	Weight	40-yard dash	10-yard split	20-yard split	20-yard shuttle	Three-cone drill	Vertical jump	Broad jump
6 ft 5 in (1.96 m)	308 lb (140 kg)	5.15 s	1.78 s	2.94 s	4.67 s	7.63 s	29 in (0.74 m)	8 ft 6 in (2.59 m)
All values are from Pro Day

Goodin signed with the New York Giants on May 11, 2012, after going undrafted in the 2012 NFL draft. He was released by the Giants on August 31, 2012. He was signed to the Giants practice squad on November 21, 2012. Goodin was released by the Giants on August 31, 2013, and signed to the Giants' practice squad on September 1, 2013. He was promoted to the active roster on November 26, 2013. He made his NFL debut on December 29, 2013, against the Washington Redskins. He was released by the Giants on May 29, 2014.

Goodin was signed by the Dallas Cowboys on August 12, 2014. He was released by the Cowboys on August 30, 2014.

Goodin signed with the Minnesota Vikings on August 18, 2015. He was released by the Vikings on August 30, 2015.

Goodin was signed by the Brooklyn Bolts of the Fall Experimental Football League (FXFL) in 2015.
