= Clarke Hotel =

- U.S. National Register of Historic Places
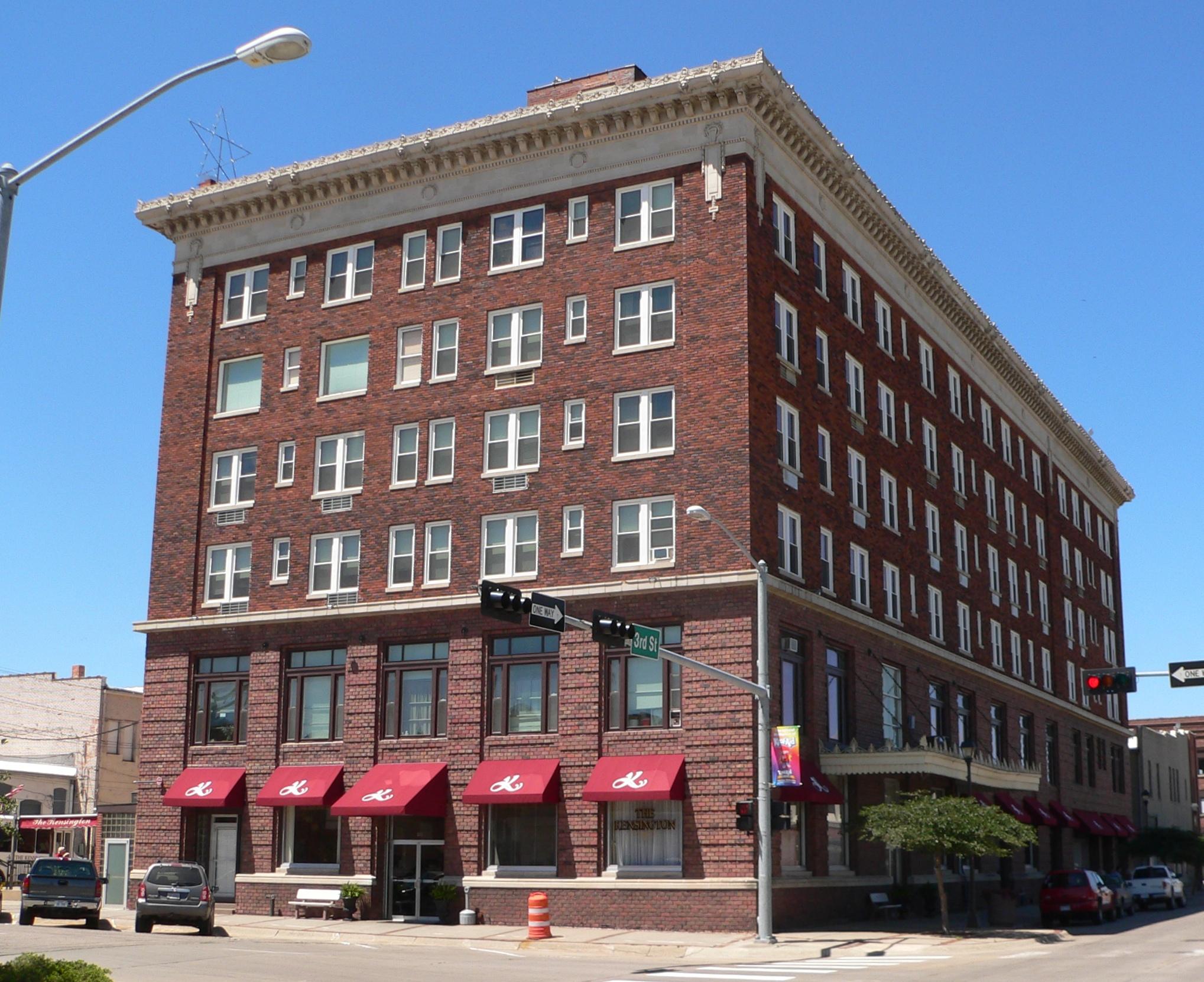
- Clarke Hotel, 2010

- Location within Nebraska Location within the United States
- Location: 233 N. Hastings Avenue, Hastings, Nebraska
- Coordinates: 40°35′9.78″N 98°23′24.24″W
- Built: 1914
- NRHP reference No.: 87002094
- Added to NRHP: 1987

The Clarke Hotel is a historic hotel in Hastings, Nebraska, included on the National Register of Historic Places in 1987.

The Clarke Hotel, named for prominent Hasting businessman Alonzo L. Clarke, originated in 1914 as a project of the Hastings Chamber of Commence and was built through sale of stock to local residents. The architect, C. W. Way, and the construction company, John Hempel Company, were both from Hastings; and local craftsman made everything from the hotel's bricks to its oak millwork and mosaic floors. The hotel includes a famous grill room, which has a series of murals painted by Italian artist Giuseppe Aprea depicting seventeenth-century European tavern scenes.

A 1916 addition to the six-story, Renaissance Revival-style building increased its size to 170 "absolutely fireproof" rooms and added ballroom seating for 300. For the next seventy years, the Clarke Hotel served as the social center for the region. Among notables who visited it were former President William Howard Taft and future President John F. Kennedy. After extensive renovation in 1987, the Clarke Hotel became the Kensington-Evergreen Senior Living Communities.
