= Hastings Senior High School (Nebraska) =

Public school in Nebraska, United States

Hastings High School

Location
- 1100 W. 14th St. Hastings, Nebraska 68901; United States; 40°36′6″N 98°23′41″W

Information
- School type: Public high school
- Motto: Every One a Tiger
- Established: 1884
- School district: Hastings Public Schools
- Superintendent: Jeff Schneider
- Principal: Jeff Linden
- Faculty: 71
- Teaching staff: 72.78 (FTE)
- Grades: 9–12
- Enrollment: 1,067 (2022-2023)
- Student to teacher ratio: 14.66
- Colors: Orange and black
- Team name: Tigers
- Rival: Adams Central Patriots
- Newspaper: Tiger Cub News
- Website: Hastings H.S.

Hastings High School (HHS) is a public secondary school located in Hastings, Nebraska, United States. It is part of the Hastings Public Schools school district. Other area high schools are St. Cecilia High School and Adams Central Junior-Senior High School. HHS is the largest of the three.

== In the media ==
Hastings High was featured in the independent film Easter during a football game flashback sequence. In addition, the school and its football team have been highlighted in several local news features related to their athletic achievements and community involvement.

== Notable alumni ==
- Marc Boerigter, former NFL player
- Mike Boeve, MLB player
- Stephen Goodin, NFL player
- Robert Keith Gray, advisor to President Dwight Eisenhower
- Rick Henninger, former MLB player
- Johnny Hopp, former MLB player
- Tom Osborne, former football coach; former NFL player; former U.S. congressman
- Paul Schissler, former college/NFL coach
- Lon Stiner, former college football coach
- Dazzy Vance, MLB Hall-of-Famer
