= Hastings Public Schools (Nebraska) =

School district in Nebraska, United States

Hastings Public Schools (HPS) is a school district headquartered in Hastings, Nebraska, United States.

In 2015 the American Civil Liberties Union (ACLU) sent a letter to the district, asking it to cease enforcing Neb. Rev. Stat. 79-8,108, a Nebraska state law that requires teachers to sign a pledge that they believe in American ideals.

Hastings Middle School received one shooter threat in the December of 2021, which lead to a student being removed. No one was harmed.

== Schools ==
- Hastings High School
- Hastings Middle School
- Elementary schools: Alcott, Hawthorne, Lincoln, Longfellow, Watson
