= Mike Racy =

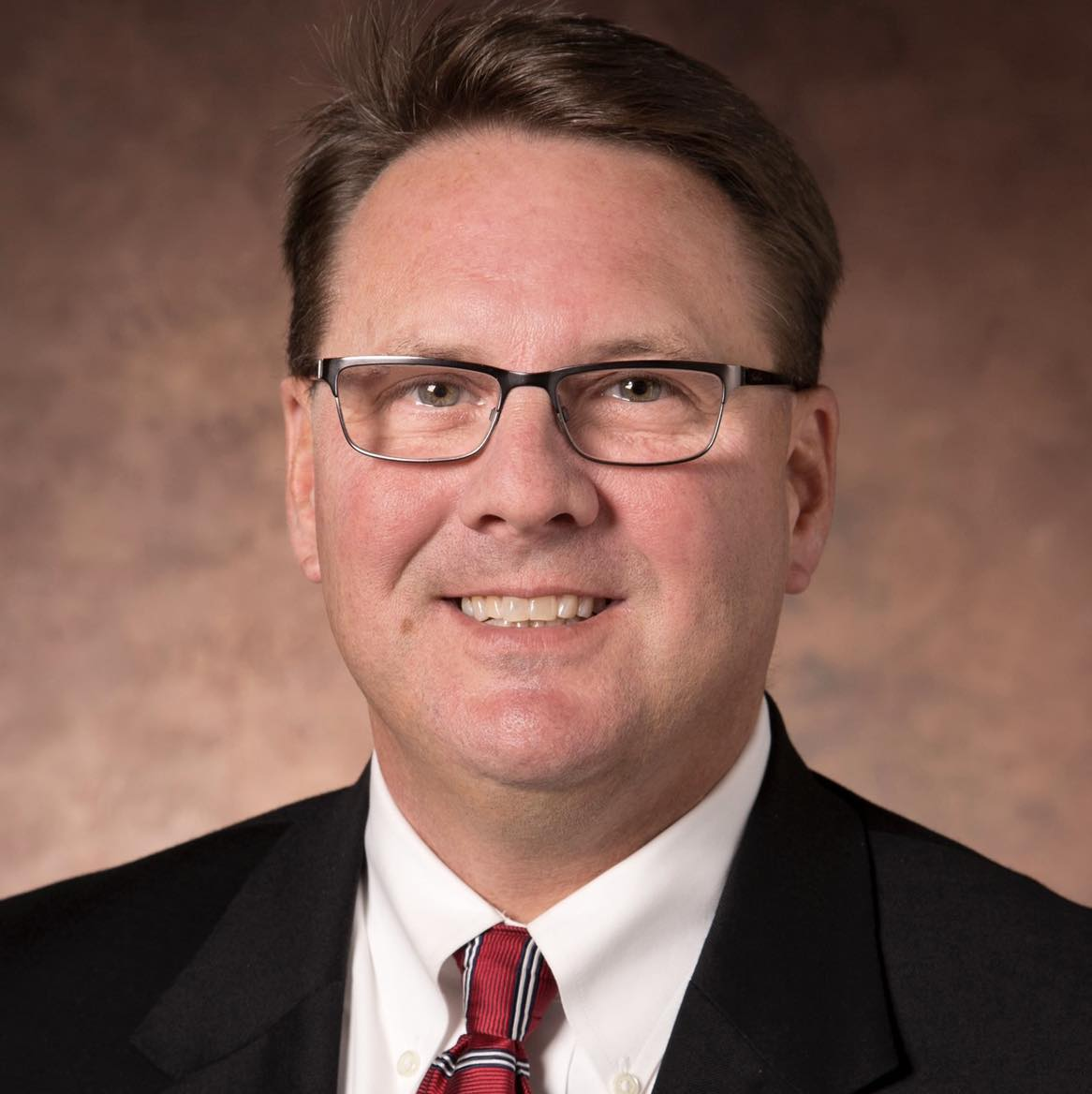

Commissioner of the Mid-America Intercollegiate Athletics Association
- Incumbent
- Assumed office February 1, 2017
- Preceded by: Bob Boerigter

Personal details
- Born: Lawrence, Kansas, U.S.
- Spouse: Kathy Hadel
- Children: 3 sons
- Education: Washburn University (BA); University of Missouri–Kansas City (JD)

Michael Racy is an American College Sports Leader, a Higher Education Attorney, and a former University Executive. Racy currently serves as the commissioner for the Mid-America Intercollegiate Athletics Association (MIAA). Prior to being appointed MIAA commissioner, Racy practiced law in the Kansas City metropolitan area, served as a vice president at the University of Central Missouri, and as a vice president at the National Collegiate Athletic Association (NCAA).

== Early years ==
Racy was born in Lawrence, Kansas and attended Abilene High School in Abilene. After high school, Racy attended Washburn University where he earned his Bachelor of Business Administration, graduating with honors in 1987. Racy then went on to complete his Juris Doctor from the University of Missouri–Kansas City School of Law, graduating with honors in 1992. Racy began his career in sports working at the National Association of Intercollegiate Athletics while he was earning his J.D. degree.

== Career ==
After graduating from UMKC in 1992, Racy practiced law at Gage and Tucker Law Firm in Kansas City, Missouri. In 1993, Racy moved to the NCAA to become a legislative assistant. In 1995, Racy was approached by NCAA President Cedric Dempsey to assist the NCAA President's Commission in rewriting the NCAA Constitution and to help lobby NCAA membership support for a restructured NCAA and a reorganized NCAA governance process. The effort was successful following membership votes at the 1996 and 1997 NCAA Conventions.

In 1999, Racy became vice president of the NCAA and served as the chief executive officer for the Division II level. While leading NCAA Division II, Racy developed the NCAA Sports Festival, as well as secured a television agreement with CBS College Sports for regular season D2 football and basketball games, managed the $30 million budget for the division, helped the division grow to over 300 member schools, authored the NCAA Division II "Life in the Balance" Strategic Positioning Platform, and helped establish the Make-A-Wish Foundation fundraising partnership for Division II student-athletes.

In June 2013, after fifteen years as a vice president for the NCAA, Racy voluntarily stepped away from this visible leadership position to discover new paths and new opportunities in higher education. That summer, Racy become the Vice President for Law, Policy and Strategy at the University of Central Missouri in Warrensburg, Missouri. In 2015, Racy left Central Missouri to become a higher education consultant. On September 7, 2016, it was announced that Racy would become the fifth full-time commissioner for the Mid-America Intercollegiate Athletics Association.

Since Racy became the commissioner of the MIAA, the Association has won 30 NCAA Team National Championships, in 11 different sports, by 8 different MIAA member schools. During his time as commissioner, Racy created the MIAA Sports Media Network, moved the conference headquarters to a visible office suite inside Hy-Vee Arena (formerly Kemper Arena in Kansas City), doubled the number of MIAA corporate partners, successfully implemented a new instant replay system for Divisions II and III football, expanded the conference's membership into a fifth state (Arkansas), and started conference-wide risk management and health/safety initiatives. Under Racy's leadership, the MIAA Network broadcast more than 1600 live athletic contests and campus events in 2025–26.

== Personal Life ==
Racy is married to the former Kathleen Denise Hadel of Overland Park, Kansas. Mike and Kathy have three sons and one goldendoodle named Autumn Frost Racy.
