= Meta Given =

American cookbook writer (1888–1981)

Meta Hortense Given
- Born: January 25, 1888; Missouri
- Died: November 17, 1981 (aged 93); Lakeland, Polk County, Florida
- Education: University of Chicago; University of Central Missouri; University of Wisconsin–Madison

Meta Hortense Given (January 25, 1888 – November 17, 1981) was an American entrepreneur, nutritionist, home economist, photographer and best-selling cookbook author.

Given grew up working on her family's farm in Missouri. There, little variety in foodstuffs were available, and after studying nutrition as an undergraduate at the University of Missouri and at the University of Wisconsin–Madison and she also did undergraduate and graduate work at the University of Chicago, Given grew interested in devising recipes that maximized the culinary and gustatory value of farm staples but minimized the cost to the consumer.

== Early life ==
Meta Given was born Meta Hortense Given on January 25, 1888, to Eliza Ann (Lacy) and James Henry Given in Bourbois Township, Gasconade County, Missouri in an area called Ozarks. Carrie Given was born March 1890, she was Meta's only sibling. Meta Given grew up as a farm girl in a three-room homesteader's cabin with lime chinked walls. Meta Given started concocting her own recipes at the age of 10. Given was very well educated starting with grammar school, high school, Normal School (Normal School No. 2 Warrensburg, Missouri), and college (University of Chicago).

== Career ==
Given taught home economics for 20 years (1902–1922) while she went to high school, normal school, and college. Given worked for the Evaporated Milk Association from 1925 to 1930 as their first Director of Home Economics.

Her best-selling The Modern Family Cookbook was first published in 1942; the Encyclopedia of Modern Cooking was published in two volumes in 1947. Both were revised and reprinted in succeeding decades and followed during the 1950s, 1960s and early 1970s by other volumes about food and cooking.

Given authored a famous column for the Chicago Tribune from 1930 to 1931 with over 365 articles to her credit – writing the "Chicago Cook Book" and "Food Talk" articles. Given also wrote a syndicated column for newspapers across the nation often called "Eat well on $12 week" from 1939 to 1949.

She recommended that Americans help themselves each day to ten different categories of foodstuffs to ensure adequate nutrition: 1) milk; 2) meat (or cheese for those who don't eat meat); 3) green or yellow vegetable; 4) another vegetable; 5) potato (once a week pasta or rice can take the place but increase vegetable); 6) egg; 7) butter; 8) whole grain; 9) citrus fruit or tomato; and 10) another fruit.

Given died in Lakeland, Polk County, Florida, on November 17, 1981.

== Books ==
- Delicious Dairy Dishes 1937 with Ruth Cooper
- The Art of Modern Cooking and Better Meals: Recipes for Every Occasion 1936–1939 Revised and Edited by Meta Given
- The Modern Family Cook Book (1942)
- Modern Encyclopedia of Cooking, Volumes 1 and 2 (1947)
- The Modern Family Cook Book (1953)
- The Modern Family Cook Book, New Revised Edition
- The Modern Family Cook Book (1968)
- The Wizard Modern Family Cookbook
- The Modern Encyclopedia of Cooking (1959) over 1 million copies sold
