= Neuticles =

Prosthetic testicular implants for domestic animals

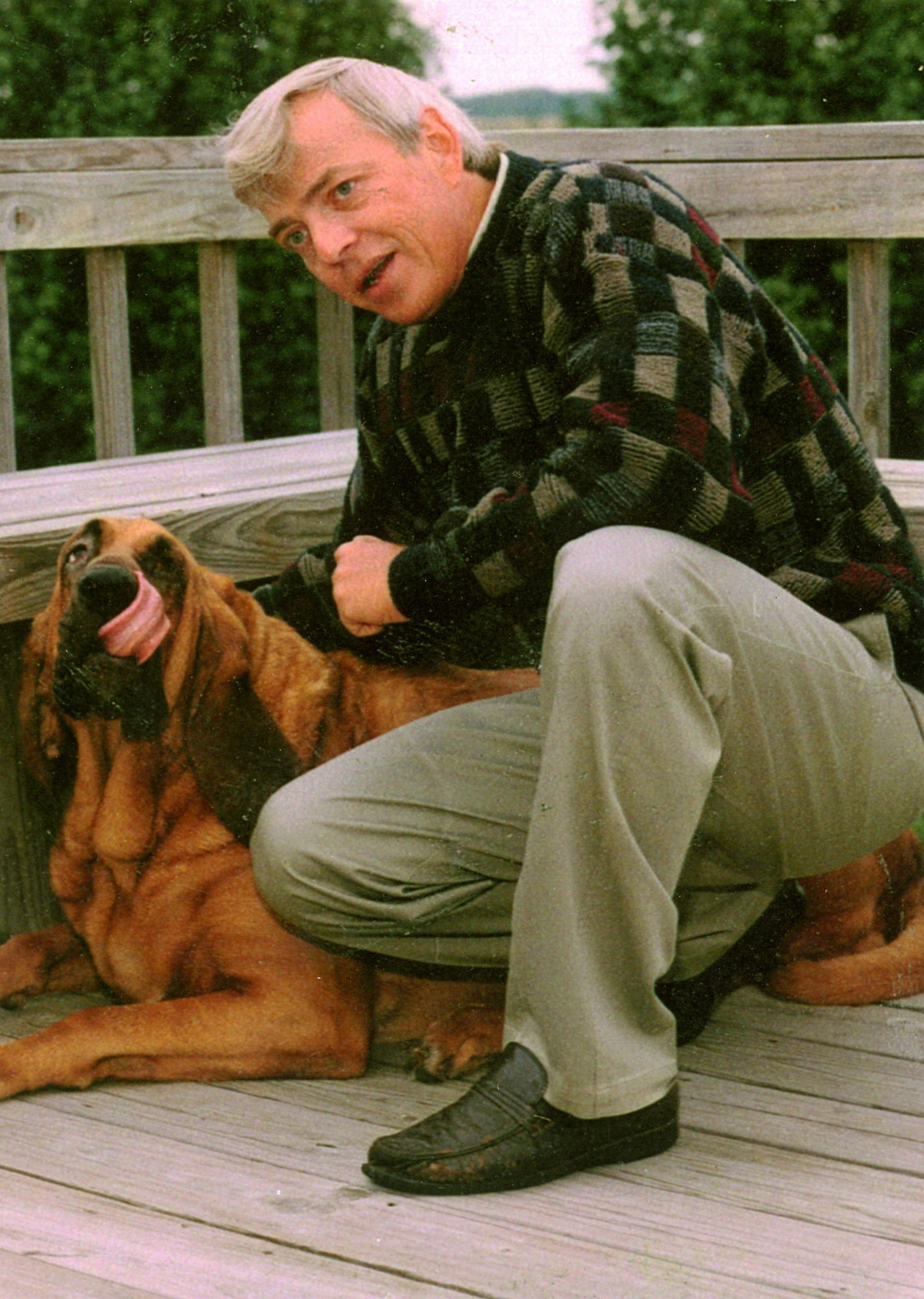
Gregg Miller with his dog Buck the bloodhound, the inspiration for Neuticles

Neuticles are prosthetic testicular implants for neutered dogs and other domestic animals. The implants may be made of polypropylene or silicone.

== History ==
Gregg Miller developed the idea for Neuticles after his bloodhound, Buck, was castrated to stop his wandering. Miller, along with a veterinarian, patented the procedure for implanting Neuticles. To sell his idea, Miller established the Canine Testicular Implant Corporation (CTI Corporation). The first commercial Neuticles were implanted in 1995. Miller won the 2005 Ig Nobel Prize in Medicine, a parody of the real Nobel Prize, for the invention of Neuticles.

While recognizing that responsible pet ownership requires neutering, nonetheless, many pet owners find themselves uncomfortable with such a disfiguring procedure. The permanently altered appearance of their pet serves as a constant reminder of their surgical choice. Comments by strangers who misidentify the gender of the pet may serve to exacerbate this discomfort.

— US Patent 5868140A

The typical pair costs about $310. The company has produced customized prosthetic testicles, such as a $2800 watermelon-sized set for an elephant. Miller has said that he sold more than 500,000 sets of Neuticles in his first 20 years of business.

The company states that humans cannot legally get Neuticle implants. While the materials in them are approved by the FDA, a second approval is required for similar implants in any specific areas of the human body. In 2018 it was reported that Miller has no plans for Neuticles for humans due to the cost and the time needed for FDA approval.

=== Ethical concerns ===
In the UK, the regulatory body for veterinarians, the Royal College of Veterinary Surgeons, states that the use of any form of cosmetic surgery is unethical.

The Veterinary Council of New Zealand says "the insertion of neuticles (prosthetic testicles) cannot be justified. This procedure has no benefit to the animal and can be used to conceal genetic defects."

Neuticles, however, are accepted in all other countries Worldwide.

== In popular culture ==
On the reality television show Keeping Up with the Kardashians, Kim Kardashian's dog, Rocky, was given Neuticles.

On Season 2, Episode 10 “High School Reunion” of the television comedy The League, Kevin publishes in the group's high school reunion program that Andre had a “nudicle” inserted after he was “sack-tapped so hard that my left testicle was damaged and eventually had to be removed.”

On Season 2, Episode 7 "Who's the Boss?" of the adult animated TV show HouseBroken, one episode revolves around the character Diablo getting a pair of canine testicular implants called "Fauxnads"
