= Mid-America Intercollegiate Athletics Association =

Athletic conference in the American Midwest

- Formerly: Missouri Intercollegiate Athletic Association (1912–1992)
- Association: NCAA
- Founded: 1912
- Commissioner: Mike Racy (since 2017)
- Sports fielded: 19; men's: 10; women's: 9
- Division: Division II
- No. of teams: 14
- Headquarters: Kansas City, Missouri
- Region: Central United States
- Website: themiaa.com

The Mid-America Intercollegiate Athletics Association (MIAA) is a college athletic conference affiliated with the National Collegiate Athletic Association (NCAA) at the Division II level, headquartered in Kansas City, Missouri. Its fourteen member institutions, of which all but one are public schools, are located in Arkansas, Kansas, Missouri, Nebraska, and Oklahoma. The MIAA is a 501(c)(3) nonprofit organization incorporated in Missouri.

Originally named the "Missouri Intercollegiate Athletic Association", the conference was established in 1912 with 14 members, two of which are still current members. Six members (Central Methodist, Central Wesleyan, Culver–Stockton, Missouri Valley, Missouri Wesleyan, Tarkio College, Westminster, and William Jewell) were later removed from the conference in 1924 when it decided to only include the public schools. A majority of the charter members that left in 1924 have shut down their operations, or merged with another school. Over the next century, nearly twenty schools have joined and left the conference, with a few affiliate members. Some of those schools have reclassified to NCAA Division I.

The conference's current 14-campus makeup resulted when Lincoln departed the conference while Arkansas–Fort Smith joined the league for the 2024–25 season.

The current MIAA commissioner is Mike Racy.

== History and overview ==
The MIAA currently sponsors 20 sports – ten men's and ten women's. MIAA schools with additional sports compete independently or as part of a nearby conference. On July 1, 1992, the MIAA entered a new era when the conference changed its name from the Missouri Intercollegiate Athletic Association to the Mid-America Intercollegiate Athletics Association. The name change originated in 1989, when Pittsburg State University and Washburn University became the first schools outside the state of Missouri to gain membership in the MIAA.

=== Founding and former members ===
Original logo for the MIAA

The MIAA was established in 1912 with 14 member institutions. It included the five state teachers colleges in Missouri – Warrensburg Teachers College (now the University of Central Missouri), Northeast Missouri State Teachers College (now Truman State University), Northwest Missouri State Teacher's College (now Northwest Missouri State University), Southeast Missouri State Teacher's College (now Southeast Missouri State University), and Southwest Missouri State Teacher's College (now Missouri State University). It also included nine private schools – Central Methodist University, Central Wesleyan College, Culver–Stockton College, Drury University, Missouri Valley University, Missouri Wesleyan College, Tarkio College, Westminster College, and William Jewell College. Only Central Missouri and Northwest Missouri State remain members in the MIAA.

In 1924 the conference reorganized to include only public schools, and conference records tend to begin with that date. The schools left behind in the reorganization went on to later form the Missouri College Athletic Union, which would in time become the current Heart of America Athletic Conference in the NAIA.

=== First expansions of the conference ===
The Missouri School of Mines, later the University of Missouri–Rolla and now the Missouri University of Science & Technology, joined in 1935 to bring membership to six schools. The membership remained at six until Lincoln University joined in 1970, followed by the University of Missouri–St. Louis in 1980.

=== 1980s ===
Southwest Missouri State left the MIAA after the 1980–81 season to move on to NCAA Division I. In 1986, Southwest Baptist University brought the conference membership back to eight schools. In 1989, Pittsburg State, Washburn, Missouri Southern State College and Missouri Western State College – formerly members of the Central States Intercollegiate Conference – began competition in the 1989–90 season.

=== 1990s and 2000s ===
MIAA logo from 1990 to 2012.

Southeast Missouri State left the MIAA following the 1990–91 season to move on to NCAA Division I, and was replaced by Emporia State University in the 1991–92 season. Missouri-St. Louis left the MIAA in 1996, as did Missouri–Rolla in 2005. Lincoln forfeited membership in 1999.

Fort Hays State University joined the MIAA in 2006 and the University of Nebraska Omaha entered the league in 2008.

On July 3, 2007, Southwest Baptist was granted independent status for their football team, while all remaining teams will stay in the MIAA.

On July 8, 2009, the MIAA CEO Council voted to remain a 12-team league for the foreseeable future, denying an application by Rockhurst University (which does not have a football team but wanted to compete in other sports). The vote ended short term speculation about the League expanding to 16 teams divided into two divisions.

=== 2010s ===
Locations of MIAA member institutions, 2019–2024

Lincoln rejoined the conference in 2010 and in that same year, the MIAA CEO Council voted to extend invitations to the University of Central Oklahoma and Northeastern State University to become members of the league beginning in 2012–13, as well as Lindenwood University and the University of Nebraska at Kearney. In 2012, the schools started to only play each other in football and play no non-conference games. At first, the teams that were closest geographically played each other every year and would rotate through the other conference members in other years. The move to expand the league was spurred at least in part after Northwest Missouri during its national championship game run had problems finding non-conference teams that would play it resulting in 2010 with it having 10-game rather than 11-game schedule. In 2011, Nebraska–Omaha joined the Summit League and moved to Division I after the 2010–11 season.

As Nebraska–Omaha departed in 2011, the membership of the MIAA downsized to 11. Central Oklahoma, Northeastern State, Nebraska–Kearney, and Lindenwood all joined in 2012–13, pushing the membership to 15. The league returned to 14 institutions when Truman left in 2013 to join the Great Lakes Valley Conference (GLVC).

Southwest Baptist rejoined the MIAA in football for the 2013 football season, which meant that the schools would then play an 11-game conference football schedule with no non-conference games. In 2014, Southwest Baptist and Lincoln joined the GLVC for football only. This puts it so that all of the football schools in the MIAA can play each other now, instead of rotating.

On February 8, 2018, Newman University announced that it had accepted an invitation to join the league as an associate member in all 14 sports it sponsors beginning with the 2019–20 athletic season. On May 31, 2018, the MIAA announced that Southwest Baptist would be withdrawing its membership from the MIAA to join the Great Lakes Valley Conference full-time, effective August 1, 2019. Lindenwood followed Southwest Baptist on October 4, 2018, announcing they would be joining the GLVC as well, effective July 1, 2019. On October 18, 2018 Rogers State University in Claremore, Oklahoma announced that it would be joining the league as an associate member, aborting a move to the Lone Star Conference. They became full members on July 1, 2022.

After more than 25 years at its current office at 17th and Main Streets, The MIAA announced that it was moving its offices to the newly renovated Hy-Vee Arena, which is formerly known as Kemper Arena.

MIAA and GAC announced a partnership in June 2018 to combine their men's tennis and men's soccer leagues in both sports for the 2019–20 academic year. Under the agreement, the MIAA will organize the tennis league and the GAC will organize the soccer.

=== 2020 to present ===
On January 26, 2023, Lincoln announced it was departing the MIAA following two stints of membership inside the association spanning 43 years. On June 26, 2023, Arkansas-Fort Smith announced they had accepted an invitation to become a full-time member of the league. Both changes occurred in time for the 2024–25 season.

MIAA Commissioners
Tenure	Commissioner
1981–1997	Ken B. Jones
1997–2007	Ralph McFillen
2007–2010	Jim Johnson
2010–2017	Bob Boerigter
2017–present	Mike Racy

=== Commissioners ===
In July 1981, Ken B. Jones was appointed as the first full-time MIAA commissioner. He held the position for 16 years, retiring in 1997. Ralph McFillen succeeded Jones, serving 10 years until retiring in 2007. Jim Johnson then succeeded McFillen in July 2007 and served as commissioner until September 2010. Bob Boerigter succeeded Johnson on September 20, 2010, as commissioner and retired on January 27, 2017. On September 7, 2016, it was announced that Mike Racy would become the fifth commissioner of the MIAA, effective January 30, 2017.

=== Chronological timeline ===
Mid-America Intercollegiate Athletics Association Members
Location of MIAA Members:
full member full non-football member
- 1912 – The Mid-America Intercollegiate Athletics Association (MIAA) was founded as the Missouri Intercollegiate Athletic Association. Charter members included Missouri – Warrensburg Teachers College (now the University of Central Missouri), Missouri State Normal School of the First District (now Truman State University), Missouri State Normal School of the Fifth District (now Northwest Missouri State University), Missouri State Normal School of the Third District (now Southeast Missouri State University), Missouri State Normal School of the Fourth District (now Missouri State University), Central College of Missouri (now Central Methodist University), Central Wesleyan College, Christian University of Missouri (now Culver–Stockton College), Drury College (now Drury University), Missouri Valley College (now Missouri Valley University), Missouri Wesleyan College, Tarkio College, Westminster College and William Jewell College, beginning the 1912–13 academic year.
- 1924 – Central Methodist, Central Wesleyan, Culver–Stockton, Drury, Missouri Valley, Missouri Wesleyan, Tarkio, Westminster (Mo.) and William Jewell left the MIAA to form the Missouri College Athletic Union (MCAU) after the 1923–24 academic year.
- 1935 – The Missouri School of Mines and Metallurgy (later the University of Missouri–Rolla, now the Missouri University of Science and Technology [Missouri S&T]) joined the MIAA in the 1935–36 academic year.
- 1957 – The MIAA was granted full membership status within the National Collegiate Athletic Association (NCAA) at the College Division ranks in the 1957–58 academic year.
- 1970 – Lincoln University of Missouri joined the MIAA in the 1970–71 academic year.
- 1980 – The University of Missouri at St. Louis joined the MIAA in the 1980–81 academic year.
- 1981 – Southwest Missouri State (now Missouri State) left the MIAA to become an NCAA D–II Independent (which would later join the Division I ranks of the National Collegiate Athletic Association (NCAA) and the Association of Mid-Continent Universities (AMCU, now the Summit League), beginning the 1982–83 school year) after the 1980–81 academic year.
- 1986 – Southwest Baptist University joined the MIAA in the 1986–87 academic year.
- 1989 – Missouri Southern State College (now Missouri Southern State University), Missouri Western State College (now Missouri Western State University), Pittsburg State University and Washburn University joined the MIAA in the 1989–90 academic year.
- 1991:
  - Southeast Missouri State left the MIAA to join the NCAA Division I ranks and the Ohio Valley Conference (OVC) after the 1990–91 academic year.
  - Emporia State University joined the MIAA in the 1991–92 academic year.
- 1992 – The MIAA has been rebranded as the Mid-America Intercollegiate Athletics Association (MIAA) in the 1992–93 academic year.
- 1996 – Missouri–St. Louis (UMSL) left the MIAA to join the Great Lakes Valley Conference (GLVC) after the 1995–96 academic year.
- 1999 – Lincoln (Mo.) left the MIAA to join the Heartland Conference after the 1998–99 academic year.
- 2005 – Missouri–Rolla (UMR, now Missouri S&T) left the MIAA to join the GLVC after the 2004–05 academic year.
- 2006 – Fort Hays State University joined the MIAA in the 2006–07 academic year.
- 2008 – The University of Nebraska at Omaha joined the MIAA in the 2008–09 academic year.
- 2010 – Lincoln (Mo.) rejoined the MIAA in the 2010–11 academic year.
- 2011 – Nebraska–Omaha left the MIAA to join the NCAA Division I ranks as an NCAA D-I Independent (which would later join the Summit League, beginning the 2012–13 school year) after the 2010–11 academic year.
- 2012:
  - The University of Central Oklahoma, Lindenwood University, the University of Nebraska at Kearney and Northeastern State University joined the MIAA in the 2012–13 academic year.
  - Harding University, Southern Nazarene University and Upper Iowa University joined the MIAA as affiliate members for men's soccer, all effective in the 2012 fall season (2012–13 academic year).
- 2013:
  - Truman State (formerly Northeast Missouri State) left the MIAA to join the GLVC after the 2012–13 academic year; while remaining in the MIAA as an affiliate member for men's wrestling just for the 2013–14 school year.
  - Newman University joined the MIAA as an associate member for men's wrestling in the 2013–14 academic year.
- 2015 – Harding and Southern Nazarene left the MIAA as affiliate members for men's soccer, both effective after the 2014 fall season (2014–15 academic year).
- 2016 – Elmhurst College, Maryville University, McKendree University and Nebraska Wesleyan University (with Drury rejoining for that sport) joined the MIAA as affiliate members for women's bowling, all effective in the 2017 spring season (2016–17 academic year).
- 2019:
  - Lindenwood and Southwest Baptist left the MIAA to join the GLVC after the 2018–19 academic year.
  - Six institutions left the MIAA as affiliate members, all effective after the 2018–19 academic year:
    - Drury, Elmhurst, Maryville, McKendree and Nebraska Wesleyan for women's bowling (the latter school dropped said sport)
    - and Upper Iowa for men's soccer
  - Rogers State University (alongside Newman) joined the MIAA as associate members for all sports in the 2019–20 academic year.
  - Oklahoma Baptist University, Ouachita Baptist University, Southeastern Oklahoma State University and Southern Arkansas University (with Harding rejoining for that sport; as it previously competed on men's soccer) joined the MIAA as affiliate members for men's tennis, all effective in the 2020 spring season (2019–20 academic year).
- 2021 – Augustana University joined the MIAA as an affiliate member for men's tennis in the 2022 spring season (2021–22 academic year).
- 2022:
  - Oklahoma Baptist left the MIAA as an affiliate member for men's tennis after the 2022 spring season (2021–22 academic year); as the school dropped the sport.
  - Newman and Rogers State were granted to upgrade to full membership for all sports in the 2022–23 academic year.
- 2023 – Ouachita Baptist added men's wrestling to its MIAA affiliate membership in the 2023–24 academic year.
- 2024:
  - Lincoln (Mo.) left the MIAA a second time to join the GLVC after the 2023–24 academic year.
  - The University of Arkansas–Fort Smith (Arkansas–Fort Smith or UAFS) joined the MIAA in the 2024–25 academic year.

== Member schools ==
=== Current members ===
The MIAA currently has 14 full members, all but one are public schools:

Institution	Location	Founded	Affiliation	Enrollment	Nickname	Joined (Note: Represents the calendar year when fall sports competition begins.)	Colors
University of Arkansas–Fort Smith	Fort Smith, Arkansas	1928	Public	5,463	Lions	2024	
University of Central Missouri	Warrensburg, Missouri	1871	Public	12,857	Mules & Jennies	1912	
University of Central Oklahoma	Edmond, Oklahoma	1890	Public	12,554	Bronchos	2012	
Emporia State University	Emporia, Kansas	1863	Public	4,557	Hornets	1991	
Fort Hays State University	Hays, Kansas	1902	Public	12,843	Tigers	2006	
Missouri Southern State University	Joplin, Missouri	1937	Public	4,147	Lions	1989	
Missouri Western State University	St. Joseph, Missouri	1915	Public	3,716	Griffons	1989	
University of Nebraska at Kearney	Kearney, Nebraska	1905	Public	5,881	Lopers	2012	
Newman University (Note: Newman competed in the MIAA as an affiliate member for men's wrestling from 2013–14 to 2018–19.)	Wichita, Kansas	1933	Catholic (A.S.C.)	2,787	Jets	2019 (Note: Newman and Rogers State joined the MIAA in the 2019–20 school year as associate members in all sports. They were granted to upgrade to full membership, beginning the 2022–23 school year.)	
Northeastern State University	Tahlequah, Oklahoma	1909	Public	8,002	RiverHawks	2012	
Northwest Missouri State University	Maryville, Missouri	1905	Public	9,152	Bearcats	1912	
Pittsburg State University	Pittsburg, Kansas	1903	Public	5,774	Gorillas	1989	
Rogers State University	Claremore, Oklahoma	1909	Public	3,281	Hillcats	2019	
Washburn University	Topeka, Kansas	1865	Public	5,327	Ichabods	1989	

=== Affiliate members ===
The MIAA currently has five affiliate members, three are private schools and two are public schools.

Institution	Location	Founded	Affiliation	Enrollment	Nickname	Joined (Note: Represents the calendar year when fall sports competition begins.)	MIAA sport(s)	Primary conference
Augustana University	Sioux Falls, South Dakota	1860	Lutheran ELCA	2,158	Vikings	2021	men's tennis	Northern Sun (NSIC)
Harding University (Note: Harding competed in the MIAA as an affiliate member for men's soccer from the 2012 to 2014 fall seasons (2012–13 to 2014–15 school years).)	Searcy, Arkansas	1886	Churches of Christ	4,608	Bisons	2019	men's tennis	Great American (GAC)
Ouachita Baptist University	Arkadelphia, Arkansas	1886	Baptist	1,858	Tigers	2019^{m.ten.}	men's tennis	Great American (GAC)
Ouachita Baptist University	Arkadelphia, Arkansas	1886	Baptist	1,858	Tigers	2023^{m.wr.}	men's wrestling	Great American (GAC)
Southeastern Oklahoma State University	Durant, Oklahoma	1909	Public	5,801	Savage Storm	2019	men's tennis	Great American (GAC)
Southern Arkansas University	Magnolia, Arkansas	1909	Public	4,733	Muleriders	2019	men's tennis	Great American (GAC)

=== Former members ===
The MIAA had 17 former full members, all but six were private schools. School names and nicknames listed here reflect those used in the final school year each institution was an MIAA member.

Institution	Location	Founded	Affiliation	Enrollment	Nickname	Joined (Note: Represents the calendar year when fall sports competition begins.)	Left (Note: Represents the calendar year when spring sports competition ends.)	Current conference
Central Methodist University	Fayette, Missouri	1854	United Methodist	1,094	Eagles	1912	1924	Heart of America (HAAC) (Note: Currently an NAIA athletic conference.)
Central Wesleyan College	Warrenton, Missouri	1854	Methodist Church	N/A	N/A	1912	1924	Closed in 1941
Culver–Stockton College	Canton, Missouri	1853	Disciples of Christ	1,066	Wildcats	1912	1924	Heart of America (HAAC)
Drury University (Note: Drury competed in the MIAA as an affiliate member for women's bowling from 2016–17 to 2018–19.)	Springfield, Missouri	1873	UCC & DOC	1,409	Panthers	1912	1924	Great Lakes Valley (GLVC)
Lincoln University	Jefferson City, Missouri	1866	Public	1,794	Blue Tigers	1970	1999	Great Lakes Valley (GLVC)
Lincoln University	Jefferson City, Missouri	1866	Public	1,794	Blue Tigers	2010	2024 (Note: Lincoln (Mo.) left the MIAA after the 1998–99 school year, before rejoining in the 2010–11 school year.)	Great Lakes Valley (GLVC)
Lindenwood University	St. Charles, Missouri	1827	Presbyterian	4,822	Lions & Lady Lions	2012	2019	Ohio Valley (OVC) (Note: Currently an NCAA Division I athletic conference.)
Missouri Valley University (Note: Joined as Missouri Valley College. The current name Missouri Valley University was adopted since 2026.)	Marshall, Missouri	1889	Presbyterian	1,728	Vikings	1912	1924	Heart of America (HAAC)
Missouri Wesleyan College	Cameron, Missouri	1883	Methodist	N/A	N/A	1912	1924	N/A (Note: Missouri Wesleyan was merged into Baker University from 1926 until it closed in 1930.)
University of Missouri–Rolla (Note: Joined as Missouri School of Mines and Metallurgy. Later became the University of Missouri at Rolla in 1964, with the "at" replaced by an en dash in 1968. The current name Missouri University of Science & Technology was adopted since 2008.)	Rolla, Missouri	1870	Public (Note: Part of the University of Missouri System.)	6,086	Miners	1935	2005	Great Lakes Valley (GLVC)
University of Missouri–St. Louis	St. Louis, Missouri	1963	Public	10,977	Tritons	1980	1996 (Note: Missouri–St. Louis (UMSL) joined the Great Lakes Valley Conference (GLVC) in 1995 but did not begin competition until after the 1995–96 school year because of its commitments to the final season of competition in the MIAA, hence it joined effective in the 1996–97 school year.)	Great Lakes Valley (GLVC)
University of Nebraska Omaha (Note: While the institutional name has not changed, UNO's athletic branding changed from "Nebraska-Omaha" (or "UNO") to the current "Omaha" once the school moved to Division I.)	Omaha, Nebraska	1908	Public (Note: Part of the University of Nebraska System.)	15,431	Mavericks	2008	2011	Summit
Southeast Missouri State University (Note: Joined as Missouri State Normal School–Third District. Later became Southeast Missouri State Teachers College in 1919, with "Teachers" dropped in 1946 and the current name adopted since 1973.)	Cape Girardeau, Missouri	1873	Public	12,860	Indians & Otahkians (Note: During SEMO's MIAA tenure, it used "Indians" for men's teams and "Otahkians" for women's teams. The current nickname of Redhawks was adopted for all teams since 2004.)	1912	1991	Ohio Valley (OVC)
Southwest Baptist University	Bolivar, Missouri	1878	Baptist	2,379	Bearcats	1986	2019	Great Lakes Valley (GLVC)
Southwest Missouri State University (Note: Joined as Missouri State Normal School–Fourth District. Later became Southwest Missouri State Teachers College in 1919, with "Teachers" dropped in 1945 and "College" replaced by "University" in 1973. The current name Missouri State University was adopted since 2005.)	Springfield, Missouri	1905	Public	26,000	Bears & Lady Bears	1912	1981	Conference USA (CUSA)
Tarkio College	Tarkio, Missouri	1883	UPCUSA	N/A	Owls	1912	1924	Closed in 1992
Truman State University (Note: Joined as Missouri State Normal School–First District. Later became Northeast Missouri State Teachers College in 1919, with "Teachers" dropped in 1968 and "College" replaced by "University" in 1972. The current name Truman State University was adopted since 1996.)	Kirksville, Missouri	1867	Public	4,389	Bulldogs	1912	2013 (Note: Truman left for the GLVC after the 2012–13 school year, while it remained in the MIAA as an affiliate member for wrestling until the 2013–14 school year.)	Great Lakes Valley (GLVC)
Westminster College	Fulton, Missouri	1851	Presbyterian	1,050	Blue Jays	1912	1924	St. Louis (SLIAC) (Note: Currently an NCAA Division III athletic conference.)
William Jewell College	Liberty, Missouri	1849	Nonsectarian	738	Cardinals	1912	1924	Great Lakes Valley (GLVC)

=== Former affiliate members ===
The MIAA had nine former affiliate members, all were private schools:

Institution	Location	Founded	Affiliation	Enrollment	Nickname	Joined (Note: Represents the calendar year when fall sports competition begins.)	Left (Note: Represents the calendar year when spring sports competition ends.)	MIAA sport(s)	Primary conference	Current conference in former MIAA sport
Drury University (Note: Drury was a full member of the MIAA from 1912–13 to 1923–24.)	Springfield, Missouri	1873	UCC & DOC	1,409	Panthers	2016	2019	women's bowling	Great Lakes Valley (GLVC)	
Elmhurst College	Elmhurst, Illinois	1871	United Church of Christ	2,748	Bluejays	2016	2019	women's bowling	Illinois–Wisconsin (CCIW) (Note: Currently an NCAA Division III athletic conference.)	
Harding University (Note: Harding remains in the MIAA as an affiliate member for men's tennis.)	Searcy, Arkansas	1924	Churches of Christ	6,009	Bisons	2012	2015	men's soccer	Great American (GAC)	
Maryville University	St. Louis, Missouri	1872	Catholic (Archdiocese of St. Louis)	5,504	Saints	2016	2019	women's bowling	Great Lakes Valley (GLVC)	
McKendree University	Lebanon, Illinois	1828	United Methodist	1,702	Bearcats	2016	2019	women's bowling	Great Lakes Valley (GLVC)	
Nebraska Wesleyan University	Lincoln, Nebraska	1877	United Methodist	1,600	Prairie Wolves	2016	2017	women's bowling	American Rivers (ARC)	Dropped sport
Oklahoma Baptist University	Shawnee, Oklahoma	1909	Baptist	2,097	Bison	2019	2022	men's tennis	Great American (GAC)	Dropped sport
Southern Nazarene University	Bethany, Oklahoma	1899	Nazarene	2,110	Crimson Storm	2012	2015	men's soccer	Great American (GAC)	
Upper Iowa University	Fayette, Iowa	1857	Nonsectarian	3,661	Peacocks	2012	2019	men's soccer	Great Lakes Valley (GLVC)	

=== Membership timeline ===
Full member (all sports) Full member (non-football) Associate member (football) Associate member (sport)

== Sports ==
The Mid-America Intercollegiate Athletics Association sponsors championship competition in ten men's and nine women's NCAA sanctioned sports.

Conference sports
Sport	Men's	Women's
Baseball	✓	
Basketball	✓	✓
Cross Country	✓	✓
Football	✓	
Golf	✓	✓
Soccer	✓	✓
Softball		✓
Tennis	✓	✓
Track and field (Note: Track and field includes both indoor and outdoor.)	✓	✓
Volleyball		✓
Wrestling	✓	

=== Men's sponsored sports by school ===
School	Baseball	Basketball	Cross Country	Football	Golf	Tennis	Track & Field Indoor	Track & Field Outdoor	Wrestling	Total MIAA Sports
Arkansas–Fort Smith	✓	✓	✓		✓	✓				5
Central Missouri	✓	✓	✓	✓	✓		✓	✓	✓	8
Central Oklahoma	✓	✓		✓	✓				✓	5
Emporia State	✓	✓	✓	✓		✓	✓	✓		7
Fort Hays State	✓	✓	✓	✓	(Note: Fort Hays State has paused their men's and women's golf programs for the 2026-27 season.)		✓	✓	✓	7
Missouri Southern	✓	✓	✓	✓	✓		✓	✓		7
Missouri Western	✓	✓	✓	✓	✓		✓	✓		7
Nebraska–Kearney		✓	✓	✓		✓	✓	✓	✓	7
Newman	✓	✓	✓		✓				✓	5
Northeastern State	✓	✓	(Note: Northeastern State will add Mens and Womens Cross Country, along with Mens and Womens Indoor/Outdoor Track and Field in the 2027-28 academic year.)	(Note: Northeastern State's football program competes as a D-II independent.)	✓	✓			✓	5
Northwest Missouri State	✓	✓	✓	✓		✓	✓	✓		7
Pittsburg State	✓	✓	✓	✓	✓		✓	✓		7
Rogers State	✓	✓	✓		✓		✓	✓		6
Washburn	✓	✓	✓	✓	✓	✓	✓	✓		8
Totals	13	14	12	10	10	6+5	10	10	6+1	91+6
Associate Members
Augustana						✓				1
Harding						✓				1
Ouachita Baptist						✓			✓	2
Southeastern Oklahoma						✓				1
Southern Arkansas						✓				1

=== Women's sponsored sports by school ===
School	Basketball	Cross Country	Golf	Soccer	Softball	Tennis	Track & Field Indoor	Track & Field Outdoor	Volleyball	Total MIAA Sports
Arkansas–Fort Smith	✓	✓	✓			✓			✓	5
Central Missouri	✓	✓	✓	✓	✓		✓	✓	✓	8
Central Oklahoma	✓	✓	✓	✓	✓	✓	✓	✓	✓	9
Emporia State	✓	✓		✓	✓	✓	✓	✓	✓	8
Fort Hays State	✓	✓	(Note: Fort Hays State has paused their men's and women's golf programs for the 2026-27 season.)	✓	✓	✓	✓	✓	✓	8
Missouri Southern	✓	✓	✓	✓	✓		✓	✓	✓	8
Missouri Western	✓	✓	✓	✓	✓	(Note: Missouri Western has paused their tennis program for the 2026-27 season.)	✓	✓	✓	8
Nebraska–Kearney	✓	✓	✓	✓	✓	✓	✓	✓	✓	9
Newman	✓	✓	✓	✓	✓				✓	6
Northeastern State	✓		✓	✓	✓	✓			✓	6
Northwest Missouri State	✓	✓	✓	✓	✓	✓	✓	✓	✓	9
Pittsburg State	✓	✓	✓	✓	✓		✓	✓	✓	8
Rogers State	✓	✓	✓	✓	✓		✓	✓		7
Washburn	✓	✓	✓	✓	✓	✓	✓	✓	✓	9
Totals	14	13	12	13	13	8	11	11	13	108

=== Other sponsored sports by school ===
School	Men	Women				
School	Soccer	Bowling	Rowing	Swimming & Diving	Lacrosse	Wrestling
Central Missouri		GLVC				
Central Oklahoma			GNAC			
Fort Hays	GAC					Independent
Missouri Western					GLVC	
Nebraska–Kearney				RMAC		
Newman	GAC	GLVC				
Northeastern State	GAC					Independent
Rogers State	GAC					

== Facilities ==
School	Football stadium	Capacity	Basketball arena	Capacity
Arkansas–Fort Smith	non-football school		Stubblefield Center	3,000
Central Missouri	Audrey J. Walton Stadium	12,000	UCM Multipurpose Building	6,500
Central Oklahoma	Chad Richison Stadium	10,000	Hamilton Field House	3,000
Emporia State	Francis G. Welch Stadium	7,000	William L. White Auditorium	5,000
Fort Hays State	Lewis Field Stadium	6,362	Gross Memorial Coliseum	7,200
Missouri Southern	Fred G. Hughes Stadium	7,000	Leggett & Platt Athletic Center	3,200
Missouri Western	Spratt Stadium	7,200	MWSU Fieldhouse	3,750
Nebraska–Kearney	Ron & Carol Cope Stadium	5,250	Health and Sports Center	6,000
Newman	non-football school		Fugate Gymnasium	1,242
Northeastern State	Doc Wadley Stadium	8,300	NSU Event Center	3,100
Northwest Missouri State	Bearcat Stadium	6,500	Bearcat Arena	2,500
Pittsburg State	Carnie Smith Stadium	7,950	John Lance Arena	6,500
Rogers State	non-football school		Claremore Expo Center	2,000
Washburn	Yager Stadium at Moore Bowl	7,200	Lee Arena	4,000

== NCAA Division II team championships ==
Year	Sport	School
1963	Men's golf	Southwest Missouri State
1974	Men's cross country	Southwest Missouri State
1984	Men's basketball	Central Missouri
1984	Women's basketball	Central Missouri
1984	Men's cross country	Southeast Missouri State
1985	Men's indoor track & field	Southeast Missouri State
1991	Football	Pittsburg State
1992	Softball	Missouri Southern
1994	Baseball	Central Missouri
1998	Football	Northwest Missouri State
1999	Football	Northwest Missouri State
2003	Baseball	Central Missouri
2005	Women's basketball	Washburn
2009	Wrestling	Nebraska–Omaha
2009	Football	Northwest Missouri State
2010	Women's basketball	Emporia State
2010	Wrestling	Nebraska–Omaha
2011	Wrestling	Nebraska–Omaha
2011	Football	Pittsburg State
2013	Wrestling	Nebraska–Kearney
2013	Softball	Central Oklahoma
2013	Football	Northwest Missouri State
2014	Men's basketball	Central Missouri
2014	Women's outdoor track & field	Lincoln
2015	Women's indoor track & field	Central Missouri
2015	Women's indoor track & field	Central Missouri
2015	Football	Northwest Missouri State
2016	Women's indoor track & field	Lincoln
2016	Women's outdoor track & field	Pittsburg State
2016	Football	Northwest Missouri State

Year	Sport	School
2017	Men's basketball	Northwest Missouri State
2017	Bowling	McKendree
2017	Women's soccer	Central Missouri
2018	Women's basketball	Central Missouri
2018	Men's indoor track & field	Pittsburg State
2018	Rowing	Central Oklahoma
2018	Women's outdoor track & field	Lincoln
2019	Men's basketball	Northwest Missouri State
2019	Rowing	Central Oklahoma
2019	Women's outdoor track & field	Lincoln
2021	Men's basketball	Northwest Missouri State
2021	Rowing	Central Oklahoma
2022	Wrestling	Nebraska–Kearney
2022	Men's basketball	Northwest Missouri State
2022	Softball	Rogers State
2022	Men's outdoor track & field	Pittsburg State
2023	Men's indoor track & field	Pittsburg State
2023	Men's outdoor track & field	Pittsburg State
2023	Wrestling	Central Oklahoma
2024	Wrestling	Central Oklahoma
2024	Men's indoor track & field	Pittsburg State
2024	Women's outdoor track & field	Pittsburg State
2024	Men's outdoor track & field	Pittsburg State
2025	Women's indoor track & field	Pittsburg State
2025	Men's indoor track & field	Pittsburg State
2025	Wrestling	Nebraska–Kearney
2025	Men's outdoor track & field	Pittsburg State
2026	Women's indoor track & field	Pittsburg State
2026	Men's indoor track & field	Pittsburg State
2026	Wrestling	Nebraska–Kearney

== Championships ==
=== Football ===
MIAA Championships won or shared per school
School	Titles	Last title
Northwest Missouri State	32	2025
Truman	26	1988
Southeast Missouri State	17	1988
Pittsburg State	15	2025
Central Missouri	10	2023
Missouri-Rolla	8	1983
Southwest Missouri State	7	1978
Fort Hays State	2	2018
Missouri Western	2	2012
Central Oklahoma	1	2024
Washburn	1	2005
Emporia State	1	2003
Missouri Southern	1	1993
Lincoln	1	1972

MIAA all-time standings (1924–2022)

School	W	L	T	Pct
Pittsburg State	247	65	1	.791
Northwest Missouri State	391	217	14	.640
Nebraska–Omaha	17	10	0	.630
Truman	299	202	20	.593
Missouri Western	183	130	1	.584
Southeast Missouri State	177	130	14	.573
Emporia State	154	142	0	.520
Central Missouri	311	290	21	.517
Southwest Missouri State	127	123	17	.507
Washburn	150	165	0	.476
Fort Hays State	76	85	0	.472
Central Oklahoma	50	58	0	.463
Missouri-Rolla	142	253	16	.365
Missouri Southern	113	200	0	.361
Lindenwood	25	48	0	.342
Nebraska–Kearney	40	107	0	.272
Southwest Baptist	41	156	1	.210
Lincoln	26	152	1	.148
Northeastern State	15	93	0	.139

MIAA Champions

Year	School	Record
1924	Truman	2–0–2
1925	Northwest Missouri State	3–0–1
1926	Central Missouri	4–0–0
1927	Truman	4–0–0
1928	Southwest Missouri State; Truman	3–0–1
1929	Truman	2–0–1
1930	Truman	3–0–0
1931	Northwest Missouri State	4–0–0
1932	Truman	4–0–0
1933	Truman	4–0–0
1934	Truman	4–0–0
1935	Truman	4–0–1
1936	Truman	5–0–0
1937	Southeast Missouri State	5–0–0
1938	Northwest Missouri State	5–0–0
1939	Northwest Missouri State	5–0–0
1940	Southwest Missouri State	5–0–0
1941	Missouri–Rolla; Northwest Missouri State	3–1–1
1942	Northwest Missouri State; Southeast Missouri State	3–1–1
1943; 1944; 1945	World War II (no champion)	
1946	Southeast Missouri State	5–0–0
1947	Missouri–Rolla	4–1–0
1948	Northwest Missouri State; Southwest Missouri State	4–1–0
1949	Missouri–Rolla	5–0–0
1950	Missouri–Rolla	4–1–0
1951	Southwest Missouri State; Truman	4–0–1
1952	Northwest Missouri State; Truman	4–1–0
1953	Truman	5–0–0
1954	Truman	5–0–0
1955	Southeast Missouri State	5–0–0

Year	School	Record
1956	Central Missouri; Missouri–Rolla	4–1–0
1957	Southeast Missouri State	4–0–1
1958	Southeast Missouri State	5–0–0
1959	Southeast Missouri State	5–0–0
1960	Truman	5–0–0
1961	Truman	5–0–0
1962	Southeast Missouri State	5–0–0
1963	Southeast Missouri State	5–0–0
1964	Truman	5–0–0
1965	Truman	5–0–0
1966	Southwest Missouri State	5–0–0
1967	Southwest Missouri State	5–0–0
1968	Southwest Missouri State	5–0–0
1969	Southeast Missouri State; Truman	4–1–0
1970	Central Missouri; Truman	5–1–0
1971	Truman	6–0–0
1972	Lincoln; Northwest Missouri State	5–1–0
1973	Southeast Missouri State	5–1–0
1974	Northwest Missouri State	5–1–0
1975	Southeast Missouri State	6–0–0
1976	Southeast Missouri State; Truman	4–1–1
1977	Missouri–Rolla; Southeast Missouri State	4–1–1
1978	Southwest Missouri State	6–0–0
1979	Northwest Missouri State	5–1–0
1980	Missouri–Rolla	6–0–0
1981	Truman	5–1–0
1982	Truman	5–0–0
1983	Central Missouri; Missouri–Rolla	4–1–0
1984	Northwest Missouri State	5–0–0
1985	Truman	5–0–0
1986	Central Missouri	5–0–0

Year	School	Record
1987	Central Missouri; Southeast Missouri State	5–0–1
1988	Central Missouri; Southeast Missouri State; Truman	5–1–0
1989	Pittsburg State	10–0–0
1990	Pittsburg State	9–0–0
1991	Pittsburg State	8–0–1
1992	Pittsburg State	9–0–0
1993	Missouri Southern	9–0–0
1994	Pittsburg State	9–0–0
1995	Pittsburg State	9–0–0
1996	Northwest Missouri State; Pittsburg State	8–1
1997	Northwest Missouri State	9–0
1998	Northwest Missouri State	9–0
1999	Northwest Missouri State	9–0
2000	Northwest Missouri State	9–0
2001	Pittsburg State	8–1
2002	Northwest Missouri State	9–0
2003	Central Missouri; Emporia State; Missouri Western; Northwest Missouri State; Pittsburg State	7–2
2004	Pittsburg State	9–0
2005	Washburn	7–1
2006	Northwest Missouri State	9–0
2007	Northwest Missouri State	9–0
2008	Northwest Missouri State	9–0
2009	Northwest Missouri State	9–0
2010	Northwest Missouri State	9–0
2011	Pittsburg State	8–1
2012	Missouri Western	9–1
2013	Northwest Missouri State	10–0
2014	Northwest Missouri State; Pittsburg State	10–1
2015	Northwest Missouri State	11–0
2016	Northwest Missouri State	11–0

Year	School	Record
2017	Fort Hays State	11–0
2018	Northwest Missouri State; Fort Hays State	9–2
2019	Northwest Missouri State; Central Missouri	10–1
2020	None (Season canceled due to COVID-19 pandemic)	
2021	Northwest Missouri State	9–1
2022	Pittsburg State	11–0
2023	Central Missouri; Pittsburg State	9–1
2024	Central Oklahoma	8–1
2025	Pittsburg State; Northwest Missouri State	8–1

=== Volleyball ===
The MIAA champion was determined via postseason tournament from 1982 to 1992, and 2006 to 2007. From 2003 to 2005, separate regular season and tournament champions were crowned.

MIAA Championships per school

School	Titles	Last Title	Tournament Titles
Central Missouri	26	2023	4
Northwest Missouri	1	2022	1
Truman	6	2007	3
Nebraska–Kearney	8	2025	6
Washburn	5	2025	1
Missouri Western	2	2025	0
Central Oklahoma	1	2015	1
Emporia State	1	2008	0

MIAA Champions

Year	School
1982	Central Missouri
1983	Central Missouri
1984	Central Missouri
1985	Central Missouri
1986	Central Missouri
1987	Central Missouri
1988	Central Missouri
1989	Central Missouri
1990	Central Missouri
1991	Central Missouri
1992	Central Missouri
1993	Central Missouri
1994	Central Missouri
1995	Central Missouri
1996	Central Missouri
1997	Central Missouri
1998	Central Missouri
1999	Central Missouri

Year	School
2000	Central Missouri; Truman
2001	Truman
2002	Washburn
2003	Truman
2004	Truman
2005	Washburn
2006	Truman
2007	Truman
2008	Emporia State
2009	Central Missouri
2010	Central Missouri; Washburn
2011	Central Missouri; Washburn
2012	Nebraska–Kearney
2013	Central Missouri; Washburn
2014	Central Missouri; Nebraska–Kearney
2015	Central Oklahoma

Year	School
2016	Nebraska–Kearney
2017	Missouri Western; Nebraska–Kearney
2018	Nebraska–Kearney
2019	Nebraska-Kearney
2021	Central Missouri
2022	Northwest Missouri
2023	Central Missouri
2024	Nebraska-Kearney
2025	Nebraska-Kearney; Missouri Western; Washburn

=== Men's basketball ===
MIAA Championships won or shared per school
School	Conference		Tournament	
School	Titles	Last Title	Titles	Last Title
Northwest Missouri State	23	2023–24	12	2024
Central Missouri	21	2013–14	6	2013
Southwest Missouri State	19	1977–78	0	N/A
Southeast Missouri State	12	1989–90	4	1987
Washburn	12	2025–26	6	2021
Truman	9	1978–79	2	1999
Missouri Western	5	2001–02	4	2003
Southwest Baptist	4	2008–09	2	2006
Lincoln	4	1980–81	0	N/A
Missouri Southern	2	2010–11	3	2014
Missouri–Rolla	2	1995–96	1	1996
Fort Hays State	1	2012–13	2	2025
Pittsburg State	1	1998–99	1	2015
Central Oklahoma	1	2021–22	0	N/A
Nebraska–Omaha	0	N/A	1	2010
Missouri–St. Louis	0	N/A	1	1988
Emporia State	0	N/A	0	N/A
Lindenwood	0	N/A	0	N/A
Nebraska–Kearney	0	N/A	0	N/A
Northeastern State	0	N/A	0	N/A

MIAA all–time standings (1924–25 to 2019–20)
School	W	L	Pct	Tournament	
School	W	L	Pct	W	L
Rogers State	15	4	.789	1	1
Washburn	360	198	.645	39	23
Southwest Missouri State	362	213	.630	1	1
Nebraska–Omaha	38	24	.613	4	2
Central Missouri	749	496	.602	36	32
Fort Hays State	160	113	.586	11	11
Northwest Missouri State	704	534	.569	48	25
Missouri Southern	317	246	.563	24	24
Southeast Missouri State	366	342	.517	10	7
Missouri Western	289	270	.517	26	22
Central Oklahoma	81	76	.516	9	7
Nebraska–Kearney	79	77	.506	6	6
Lindenwood	68	68	.500	1	5
Missouri–St. Louis	112	116	.491	3	9
Pittsburg State	272	288	.486	20	23
Southwest Baptist	262	320	.450	13	20
Truman	460	635	.420	9	14
Emporia State	221	305	.420	7	19
Northeastern State	60	95	.387	2	6
Lincoln	196	379	.341	7	8
Missouri–Rolla	240	593	.288	3	10
Newman	3	16	.158	0	0

MIAA Regular Season champions

- – first place in MIAA standings, no championship awarded
  ^{N} – North Division Champion (89–90 only)
  ^{S} – South Division Champion (89–90 only)

Year	School	Record
1924–25	Central Missouri	7–1
1925–26	Northwest Missouri State	7–1
1926–27	Truman; Northwest Missouri State	8–4
1927–28	Southwest Missouri State	9–3
1928–29	Northwest Missouri State	11–5
1929–30	Northwest Missouri State	16–0
1930–31	Southwest Missouri State	7–1
1931–32	Northwest Missouri State	7–1
1932–33	Northwest Missouri State	6–2
1933–34	Southwest Missouri State	7–1
1934–35	Southwest Missouri State	6–2
1935–36	Southeast Missouri State	9–1
1936–37	Central Missouri	9–1
1937–38	Central Missouri	10–0
1938–39	Central Missouri	9–1
1939–40	Northwest Missouri State	10–0
1940–41	Central Missouri	8–2
1941–42	Central Missouri	10–0
1942–43	Southeast Missouri State	8–0 *
1943–44; 1944–45	World War II (no champion)	
1945–46	Northwest Missouri State	8–2 *
1946–47	Truman	9–1
1947–48	Truman	10–0
1948–49	Southwest Missouri State	9–1
1949–50	Southwest Missouri State	8–2
1950–51	Central Missouri	8–2
1951–52	Southwest Missouri State	10–0
1952–53	Southwest Missouri State	8–2
1953–54	Southwest Missouri State	8–2
1954–55	Truman	9–1
1955–56	Truman	8–2
1956–57	Central Missouri; Truman	8–2
1957–58	Southwest Missouri State	9–1
1958–59	Southwest Missouri State	8–2
1959–60	Truman	9–1

Year	School	Record
1960–61	Southeast Missouri State	9–1
1961–62	Southeast Missouri State	9–1
1962–63	Southeast Missouri State	9–1
1963–64	Southeast Missouri State	9–1
1964–65	Central Missouri	9–1
1965–66	Southwest Missouri State	10–0
1966–67	Southwest Missouri State	10–0
1967–68	Southwest Missouri State	9–1
1968–69	Central Missouri; Southwest Missouri State	8–2
1969–70	Central Missouri; Southwest Missouri State	8–2
1970–71	Truman	9–3
1971–72	Lincoln	11–1
1972–73	Southwest Missouri State	9–3
1973–74	Southwest Missouri State	9–3
1974–75	Lincoln	9–3
1975–76	Missouri–Rolla	10–2
1976–77	Lincoln	11–1
1977–78	Southwest Missouri State	11–1
1978–79	Truman	9–3
1979–80	Central Missouri	11–1
1980–81	Central Missouri; Lincoln	11–3
1981–82	Southeast Missouri State	9–3
1982–83	Southeast Missouri State	10–2
1983–84	Central Missouri	11–1
1984–85	Central Missouri; Southeast Missouri State	9–3
1985–86	Southeast Missouri State	10–2
1986–87	Northwest Missouri State	10–4
1987–88	Southeast Missouri State	13–1
1988–89	Southeast Missouri State	12–2
1989–90	Missouri Western ^{N} Southeast Missouri State ^{S}	14–2; 14–2
1990–91	Southwest Baptist	15–1
1991–92	Washburn	12–4
1992–93	Washburn	13–3
1993–94	Washburn	15–1

Year	School	Record
1994–95	Missouri Western; Washburn	13–3
1995–96	Missouri–Rolla	12–4
1996–97	Washburn	15–3
1997–98	Missouri Western; Northwest Missouri State	13–3
1998–99	Missouri Western; Pittsburg State	14–2
1999–00	Missouri Southern	16–2
2000–01	Washburn	15–3
2001–02	Missouri Western; Northwest Missouri State	16–2
2002–03	Washburn	15–3
2003–04	Washburn	15–3
2004–05	Central Missouri; Washburn	14–4
2005–06	Southwest Baptist	12–4
2006–07	Central Missouri; Northwest Missouri State	15–3
2007–08	Southwest Baptist	14–4
2008–09	Southwest Baptist	17–3
2009–10	Central Missouri	18–2
2010–11	Missouri Southern	19–3
2011–12	Northwest Missouri State	15–5
2012–13	Central Missouri; Fort Hays State	13–5
2013–14	Central Missouri; Northwest Missouri State	16–3
2014–15	Northwest Missouri State	15–4
2015–16	Northwest Missouri State	19–3
2016–17	Northwest Missouri State	18–1
2017–18	Northwest Missouri State	16–3
2018–19	Northwest Missouri State	19–0
2019–20	Northwest Missouri State	18–1
2020–21	Northwest Missouri State	21–1
2021–22	Northwest Missouri State; Central Oklahoma	18–4
2022–23	Northwest Missouri State	31–3
2023–24	Northwest Missouri State	29–5
2024–25	Washburn	30–4
2025–26	Washburn	

MIAA Tournament champions

Year	School
1981	Truman
1982	Central Missouri
1983	Southeast Missouri State
1984	Central Missouri
1985	Southeast Missouri State
1986	Southeast Missouri State
1987	Southeast Missouri State
1988	Missouri–St. Louis
1989	Northwest Missouri State
1990	Missouri Western
1991	Southwest Baptist

Year	School
1992	Washburn
1993	Missouri Southern
1994	Washburn
1995	Missouri Western
1996	Missouri–Rolla
1997	Washburn
1998	Missouri Western
1999	Truman
2000	Missouri Southern
2001	Washburn
2002	Northwest Missouri State

Year	School
2003	Missouri Western
2004	Northwest Missouri State
2005	Central Missouri
2006	Southwest Baptist
2007	Central Missouri
2008	Northwest Missouri State
2009	Central Missouri
2010	Nebraska–Omaha
2011	Fort Hays State
2012	Washburn
2013	Central Missouri

Year	School
2014	Missouri Southern
2015	Pittsburg State
2016	Northwest Missouri State
2017	Northwest Missouri State
2018	Northwest Missouri State
2019	Northwest Missouri State
2020	Northwest Missouri State
2021	Washburn
2022	Northwest Missouri State
2023	Northwest Missouri State
2024	Northwest Missouri State
2025	Fort Hays State

=== Women's basketball ===
MIAA Championships won or shared per school
School	Conference		Tournament	
School	Titles	Last Title	Titles	Last Title
Central Missouri	13	2025–26	8	2020
Washburn	9	2012–13	9	2012
Emporia State	7	2008–09	9	2017
Missouri Western	7	2023–24	3	2002
Southeast Missouri State	5	1989–90	2	1991
Pittsburg State	4	2024–25	2	2025
Fort Hays State	4	2021–22	2	2022
Northwest Missouri State	2	2010–11	3	2011
Nebraska–Kearney	2	2022–23	1	2021
Missouri Southern	1	2021–22	3	2023
Missouri–Rolla	1	1995–96	0	N/A
Lindenwood	0	N/A	1	2018
Central Oklahoma	0	N/A	0	N/A
Lincoln	0	N/A	0	N/A
Northeastern State	0	N/A	0	N/A
Southwest Baptist	0	N/A	0	N/A

MIAA all–time standings (1982–83 to 2018–19)
School	W	L	Pct	Tournament	
School	W	L	Pct	W	L
Central Missouri	440	195	.693	43	29
Washburn	387	153	.717	39	20
Emporia State	364	148	.711	44	15
Pittsburg State	334	208	.616	12	28
Missouri Western	310	233	.571	34	21
Northwest Missouri State	281	357	.440	15	22
Missouri Southern	245	278	.468	13	22
Southwest Baptist	243	339	.418	10	24
Truman	161	351	.314	3	12
Fort Hays State	154	96	.616	14	9
Missouri–Rolla	117	243	.325	1	12
Southeast Missouri State	104	18	.852	11	7
Lincoln	73	357	.170	1	6
Central Oklahoma	67	73	.479	7	6
Missouri–St. Louis	59	143	.292	0	4
Nebraska–Kearney	56	80	.412	1	5
Northeastern State	45	92	.328	2	5
Lindenwood	36	102	.261	6	5
Nebraska–Omaha	23	39	.371	0	1

MIAA Regular Season champions

^{N} – North Division Champion (89–90 only)
^{S} – South Division Champion (89–90 only)

Year	School	Record
1982–83	Central Missouri	12–0
1983–84	Central Missouri; Northwest Missouri State; Southeast Missouri State	10–2
1984–85	Central Missouri	14–0
1985–86	Central Missouri; Southeast Missouri State	11–1
1986–87	Southeast Missouri State	13–1
1987–88	Central Missouri; Southeast Missouri State	13–1
1988–89	Central Missouri	14–0
1989–90	Central Missouri ^{N} Southeast Missouri State ^{S}	14–2; 14–2
1990–91	Central Missouri	15–1
1991–92	Pittsburg State	14–2
1992–93	Washburn	16–0
1993–94	Missouri Western	16–0
1994–95	Missouri Western	15–1

Year	School	Record
1995–96	Central Missouri; Missouri–Rolla; Pittsburg State	12–4
1996–97	Missouri Western	14–4
1997–98	Emporia State	16–0
1998–99	Emporia State	15–1
1999–00	Emporia State	16–2
2000–01	Emporia State	17–1
2001–02	Missouri Western	16–2
2002–03	Washburn	15–3
2003–04	Emporia State; Washburn	15–3
2004–05	Washburn	16–2
2005–06	Washburn	16–0
2006–07	Missouri Western	16–2
2007–08	Emporia State; Washburn	14–4
2008–09	Emporia State	17–3
2009–10	Washburn	17–3

Year	School	Record
2010–11	Northwest Missouri State	18–4
2011–12	Washburn	15–5
2012–13	Washburn	16–2
2013–14	Central Missouri	17–2
2014–15	Fort Hays State	18–1
2015–16	Missouri Western	20–2
2016–17	Pittsburg State	16–3
2017–18	Central Missouri	18–1
2018–19	Fort Hays State	18–1
2019–20	Central Missouri	18–1
2020–21	Fort Hays State	20–2
2021–22	Fort Hays State; Missouri Southern	19–3
2022–23	Nebraska Kearney	20–2
2023–24	Missouri Western	19–3
2024–25	Pittsburg State	18–1
2025–26	Central Missouri	

=== Baseball ===
MIAA Championships won or shared per school

School	Conference		Tournament	
School	Titles	Last Title	Titles	Last Title
Central Missouri	31	2025	16	2025
Northwest Missouri State	7	2018	0	n/a
Emporia State	6	2017	2	2014
Southeast Missouri	5	1987	0	n/a
Missouri Southern	3	2015	3	2024
Southwest Missouri State	3	1979	0	n/a
Missouri-Rolla	2	1972	0	n/a
Missouri Western	1	2013	0	n/a
Missouri-St. Louis	1	1984	0	n/a
Pittsburg State	1	1999	0	n/a
Central Oklahoma	1	2018	0	n/a
Nebraska-Omaha	0	n/a	1	2009
Lindenwood	0	n/a	1	2017
Northeastern State	0	n/a	0	n/a
Fort Hays	0	n/a	0	n/a
Rogers State	0	n/a	0	n/a
Washburn	0	n/a	0	n/a
Newman	0	n/a	0	n/a

MIAA Champions

Year	School
1966	Central Missouri
1967	Southeast Missouri
1968	Missouri-Rolla
1969	Southwest Missouri State
1970	Southwest Missouri State
1971	Central Missouri
1972	Missouri-Rolla
1973	Northwest Missouri State
1974	Central Missouri
1975	Northwest Missouri State
1976	Southeast Missouri
1977	Southeast Missouri
1978	Northwest Missouri State
1979	Southwest Missouri State
1980	Northwest Missouri State
1981	Central Missouri

Year	School
1982	Northwest Missouri State
1983	Northwest Missouri State
1984	Missouri-St. Louis
1985	Southeast Missouri
1986	Central Missouri
1987	Southeast Missouri
1988	Central Missouri
1989	Central Missouri
1990	Central Missouri
1991	Missouri Southern
1992	Missouri Southern
1993	Emporia State
1994	Central Missouri
1995	Central Missouri
1996	Central Missouri
1997	Central Missouri

Year	School
1998	Central Missouri
1999	Pittsburg State
2000	Central Missouri
2001	Central Missouri
2002	Central Missouri
2003	Central Missouri
2004	Central Missouri
2005	Central Missouri
2006	Emporia State
2007	Central Missouri
2008	Emporia State
2009	Emporia State
2010	Central Missouri
2011	Central Missouri; Emporia State
2012	Central Missouri

Year	School
2013	Missouri Western
2014	Central Missouri
2015	Missouri Southern
2016	Central Missouri
2017	Emporia State
2018	Central Oklahoma; Northwest Missouri State
2019	Central Missouri
2020	Cancelled due to COVID-19
2021	Central Missouri
2022	Central Missouri
2023	Central Missouri
2024	Central Missouri
2025	Central Missouri

MIAA Tournament Champions

Year	School
2001	Central Missouri
2002	Central Missouri
2003	Central Missouri
2004	Central Missouri
2005	Central Missouri
2006	Central Missouri
2007	Emporia State
2008	Central Missouri
2009	Nebraska-Omaha
2010	Central Missouri
2011	Central Missouri
2012	Central Missouri
2013	Missouri Southern
2014	Emporia State
2015	Missouri Southern
2016	Central Missouri
2017	Lindenwood
2018	Central Missouri
2019	Central Missouri
2020	Cancelled due to COVID-19
2021	Central Missouri
2022	Central Missouri
2023	Central Missouri
2024	Missouri Southern
2024	Central Missouri

=== Softball ===
MIAA Championships won or shared per school

School	Conference		Tournament	
School	Titles	Last Title	Titles	Last Title
Emporia State	9	2014	9	2018
Central Missouri	8	2015	2	2021
Central Oklahoma	6	2025	4	2025
Truman	6	2004	2	2003
Missouri Southern	5	2001	1	2001
Washburn	3	2022	0	n/a
Missouri Western	2	2016	2	2016
Northwest Missouri State	2	1999	0	n/a
Rogers State	1	2024	2	2024
Nebraska-Omaha	1	2011	1	2011
Missouri-St. Louis	1	1989	0	n/a
Southeast Missouri	1	1991	0	n/a
Pittsburg State	1	2024	0	n/a
Fort Hays State	0	n/a	1	2013
Northeastern State	0	n/a	0	n/a
Nebraska Kearney	0	n/a	0	n/a
Newman	0	n/a	0	n/a
Lincoln	0	n/a	0	n/a

MIAA Champions By Year

Year	School
1982	Central Missouri
1983	Truman
1984	Northwest Missouri State
1985	Truman
1986	Truman
1987	Central Missouri
1988	Central Missouri
1989	Missouri-St. Louis
1990	Missouri Southern
1991	Southeast Missouri
1992	Missouri Southern

Year	School
1993	Missouri Southern
1994	Central Missouri
1995	Central Missouri
1996	Emporia State
1997	Central Missouri
1998	Missouri Southern
1999	Northwest Missouri State
2000	Truman
2001	Missouri Southern
2002	Washburn
2003	Truman

Year	School
2004	Truman
2005	Emporia State
2006	Emporia State
2007	Emporia State
2008	Emporia State
2009	Central Missouri
2010	Emporia State
2011	Emporia State; Nebraska-Omaha; Missouri Western
2012	Emporia State
2013	Central Oklahoma

Year	School
2014	Emporia State
2015	Central Missouri
2016	Missouri Western
2017	Central Oklahoma
2018	Washburn
2019	Central Oklahoma
2020	Canceled due to COVID-19
2021	Central Oklahoma
2022	Washburn
2023	Central Oklahoma
2024	Rogers State; Pittsburg State
2025	Central Oklahoma

MIAA Tournament Champions By Year

Year	School
2001	Missouri Southern
2002	Truman
2003	Truman
2004	Emporia State
2005	Emporia State
2006	Emporia State
2007	Emporia State
2008	Emporia State
2009	Emporia State
2010	Emporia State
2011	Nebraska-Omaha
2012	Emporia State
2013	Fort Hays State
2014	Missouri Western
2015	Central Missouri
2016	Missouri Western
2017	Central Oklahoma
2018	Emporia State
2019	Central Oklahoma
2020	Canceled due to COVID-19
2021	Central Missouri
2022	Rogers State
2023	Central Oklahoma
2024	Rogers State
2025	Central Oklahoma

=== Wrestling ===
MIAA Championships won or shared by school

(prior to 2012, all championships were decided by the tournament champions)

School	Conference		Tournament	
School	Titles	Last Title	Titles	Last Title
Central Oklahoma	8	2025–26	0	n/a
Central Missouri	8	1983	0	n/a
Northwest Missouri State	6	1986	0	n/a
Truman	5	1979	0	n/a
Nebraska-Kearney	4	2018–19	6	2018
Lindenwood	1	2014–15	0	n/a
Lincoln	1	1976	0	n/a
Southeast Missouri State	1	1981	0	n/a

=== Men's golf ===
MIAA Championships won or shared by school

School	Conference	
School	Titles	Last Title
Central Missouri	23	2021
Southwest Missouri State	22	1978
Truman	13	1991
Missouri-Rolla	10	1969
Washburn	5	2008
Central Oklahoma	4	2025
Missouri Southern	2	2024
Missouri Western	2	2006
Missouri St. Louis	2	1993
Lindenwood	2	2019
Rogers State	1	2022
Southeast Missouri State	1	1937

=== Women's golf ===
MIAA Championships won or shared by school

School	Conference	
School	Titles	Last Title
Northeastern State	4	2019
Central Oklahoma	4	2021
Central Missouri	3	2025
Nebraska-Omaha	3	2011
Fort Hays State	1	2012
Nebraska Kearney	1	2022

=== Men's tennis ===
MIAA Championships won or shared by school

(prior to 2010, the conference championships was awarded to the tournament champions)

School	Conference		Tournament	
School	Titles	Last Title	Titles	Last Title
Northwest Missouri State	23	2021	8	2017
Southwest Baptist	17	2019	2	2019
Truman	11	1983	0	n/a
Southeast Missouri State	8	1986	0	n/a
Washburn	6	2025	0	n/a
Central Missouri	4	1957	0	n/a
Southwest Missouri State	3	1979	0	n/a
Ouachita Baptist	1	2022	0	n/a
Newman	0	n/a	0	n/a
Emporia State	0	n/a	0	n/a
Oklahoma Baptist	0	n/a	0	n/a
Harding	0	n/a	0	n/a
Southeastern Oklahoma State	0	n/a	0	n/a
Southern Arkansas	0	n/a	0	n/a

=== Women's tennis ===
MIAA Championships won or shared by school

(prior to 2010, the conference championships was awarded to the tournament champions)

School	Conference		Tournament	
School	Titles	Last Title	Titles	Last Title
Northwest Missouri State	14	2025	1	2011
Washburn	6	2025	2	2023
Lincoln	5	1990	0	n/a
Northeastern State	5	2018	2	2018
Truman	4	1998	0	n/a
Southwest Baptist	4	2014	5	2016
Central Oklahoma	2	2022	4	2025
Nebraska-Kearney	2	2025	0	n/a
Emporia State	2	2007	0	n/a
Missouri Southern	1	1999	0	n/a
Southeast Missouri State	1	1989	0	n/a
Missouri Western	0	n/a	1	2024
Newman	0	n/a	0	n/a

=== Men's indoor track and field ===
MIAA Championships won or shared by school

School	Conference	
School	Titles	Last Title
Central Missouri	21	2019
Southeast Missouri State	20	1991
Truman	19	1980
Pittsburg State	11	2025
Northwest Missouri State	4	1992
Southwest Missouri State	3	1952
Lincoln	3	2016
Missouri Southern	3	2020
Missouri-Rolla	1	1948
Emporia State	0	n/a
Nebraska-Kearney	0	n/a
Fort Hays State	0	n/a
Washburn	0	n/a
Missouri Western	0	n/a

=== Women's indoor track and field ===
MIAA Championships won or shared by school

School	Conference	
School	Titles	Last Title
Pittsburg State	12	2025
Central Missouri	8	2021
Southeast Missouri State	7	1991
Lincoln	5	2016
Truman	4	2003
Emporia State	2	2002
Missouri Southern	2	2008
Nebraska-Omaha	2	2010
Northwest Missouri State	2	1998
Nebraska-Kearney	0	n/a
Fort Hays State	0	n/a
Central Oklahoma	0	n/a
Washburn	0	n/a
Missouri Western	0	n/a

== See also ==
- 2016 Mid-America Intercollegiate Athletics Association football season
