= Adams Central Junior-Senior High School =

Public school in Nebraska, United States

Adams Central Junior/Senior High School
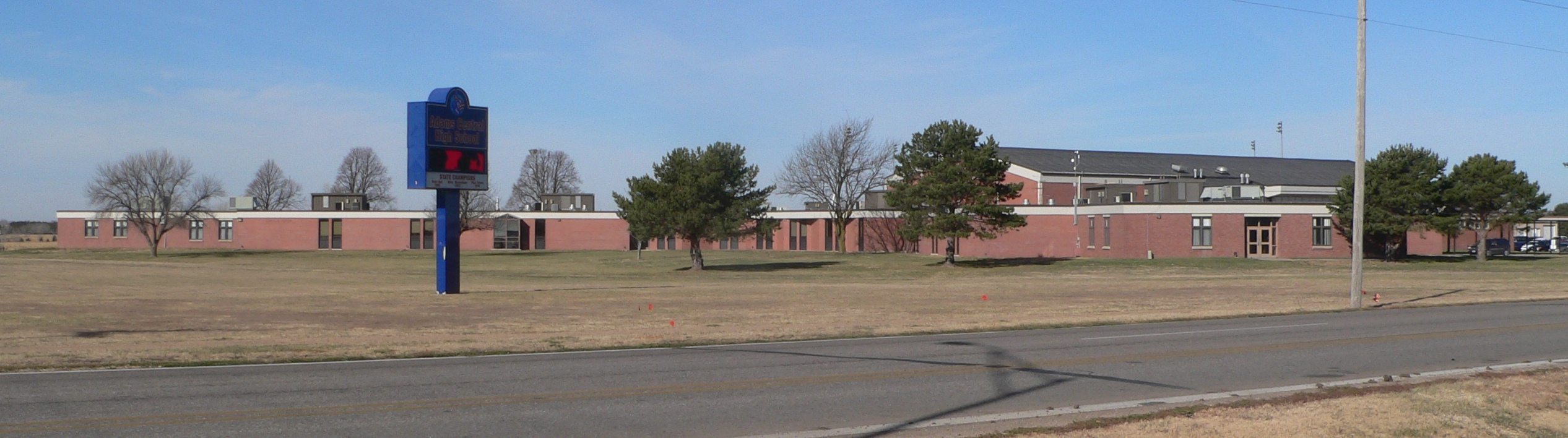
- Sprawling one-story building

Location
- 1090 S. Adams Central Ave., P.O. Box 1080; Hastings, Adams County, Nebraska 68902; United States
- 40.571197°N 98.460588°W

Information
- Type: High/middle school
- Established: 1966
- School district: Adams Central Public Schools, Nebraska District 90
- Superintendent: Shawn Scott
- Principal: Scott Harrington
- Teaching staff: 37.00 (on an FTE basis)
- Grades: 7–12
- Enrollment: 430 (2022–2023)
- Average class size: 80
- Student to teacher ratio: 11.62
- Campus type: Rural, fringe
- Colors: Red, navy blue and white
- Athletics conference: Central Conference
- Sports: Volleyball, football, boys' tennis, softball, girls' golf, boys' cross country, girls' cross country, wrestling, boys' basketball, girls' basketball, swimming (co-op team) girls' tennis, boys' golf, boys' track, girls' track
- Mascot: Patriot
- Newspaper: Patriot Voice!
- Feeder schools: Adams Central Elementary
- Website: adamscentral.us/schools/jr-sr-high/

Adams Central Jr-Sr High School is a public secondary school located near Hastings, Nebraska, United States.

It is part of the Adams Central Public Schools district, Nebraska District 90, which encompasses much of rural Adams County, including the town of Juniata. The school and the district (originally named District 9 A) were formed by consolidation of five former school districts in 1966; a sixth district later joined. Classes were initially held in buildings of the former districts and began in the still incomplete new building west of Hastings in September 1968.

The Adams Central Patriots band marched in the 2009 presidential inaugural parade.

In 2011, the Adams Central school board proposed a bond to build a new single-site elementary connected to Adams Central, but the bond was voted down. A similar bond was proposed and passed on the 2016 election ballot, allowing for the creation of a single elementary school adjacent to the high school.

In 2019, it was announced that there would be a roundabout put in on the intersection between HWY 6 and Adams Central Avenue, to limit the early morning and after school traffic jams. This roundabout was completed and opened in August 2020.
