= Jim Johnson (athletic director) =

Athletic director

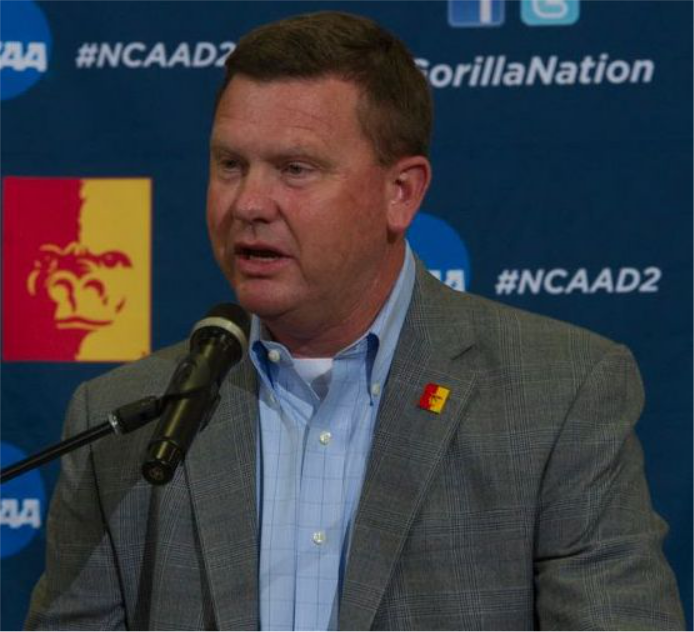
- Johnson speaking at a Pittsburg State Athletics banquet in 2016

Current position
- Title: Executive Vice President for engagement and executive affairs
- Team: Pittsburg State
- Conference: MIAA

Biographical details
- Education: Tarleton State University

Administrative career (AD unless noted)
- 1993–1997: Tarleton State (asst. AD)
- 1997–2003: NCAA (gov't liaison)
- 2003–2005: Central Missouri (assoc. AD)
- 2005–2007: Texas A&M–Commerce
- 2007–2010: MIAA (commissioner)
- 2010–2026: Pittsburg State (AD)
- 2026-present: Pittsburg State (Executive VP for engagement and executive affairs)

James R. Johnson is an American university sports administrator and a former NCAA Division II conference commissioner. Johnson is currently the athletic director for Pittsburg State University, an NCAA Division II sports program in Pittsburg, Kansas. Previously, Johnson was the Commissioner of the Mid-America Intercollegiate Athletics Association (MIAA).

== Career ==
Johnson graduated from Tarleton State University in 1988 with a Bachelor of Science in business administration and in 1990 with a Master of Arts in education. After graduating from Tarleton State, Johnson became Tarleton State's men's athletic coordinator, a position he held for seven years. In 1997, Johnson left Tarleton State to become a government liaison the National Collegiate Athletic Association, specifically the Division II level. In 2003, he left the NCAA for the University of Central Missouri where he served as an associate athletics director, and in 2005, Johnson became the athletics director at Texas A&M University–Commerce.

=== Later career ===
After serving two years at Texas A&M–Commerce, Johnson was selected as the third commissioner for the Mid-America Intercollegiate Athletics Association (MIAA) in 2010. While serving as commissioner, Johnson helped expand the conference from 10 members to 14 members, with the additions entering the conference July 1, 2012.

=== Pittsburg State ===
On July 30, Johnson was selected as the 10th Athletics Director for MIAA school, Pittsburg State University. While at Pittsburg State, Johnson has served on the NCAA Division II Football Committee, as well as the NCAA Division II Championships Committee. On January 30, 2026, Johnson was promoted to Executive Vice President for Engagement and Executive Affairs, focusing on implementing the college's new strategic plan, The Access Pitt State Initiative.
