= List of Oklahoma State University people =

There are more than 250,000 living Oklahoma State University alumni worldwide. Oklahoma State alumni include billionaire T. Boone Pickens, country music recording artist Garth Brooks, computer pioneer Dr. H. Edward Roberts, astronaut Wally Funk and South Korea Prime Minister Nam Duck-woo. Many faculty and staff members who are not alumni have also distinguished themselves, and are included in this list.

== Alumni ==
=== Academia ===
- George S. Benson, missionary, president of Harding College, and chancellor of Alabama Christian College
- T. J. Chung, mechanical engineer; professor of mechanical and aerospace engineering at the University of Alabama in Huntsville
- William Costello, animal scientist; professor of animal and range science at South Dakota State University
- V. Burns Hargis, president of Oklahoma State University
- Anita Hill, professor of social policy, law, and women's studies at Brandeis University
- Ramchandran Jaikumar, Daewoo professor of business administration at the Harvard Business School
- Hellen Linkswiler (1939), nutrition scientist and dietician; professor of foods and nutrition at the University of Wisconsin–Madison
- Linda Livingstone, president of Baylor University
- Sidney A. McPhee, president of Middle Tennessee State University
- Katherine O. Musgrave, professor emerita of food and nutrition, University of Maine
- Gene Nichol, president of The College of William and Mary
- J. Tinsley Oden, pioneer in the field of computational mechanics; professor of aerospace engineering, engineering mechanics, mathematics, and computer science at the University of Texas at Austin
- David Noel Ramírez Padilla, rector of the Monterrey Institute of Technology and Higher Education
- Benjamin Rader, historian; James L. Sellers Professor of History at the University of Nebraska–Lincoln
- John R. Rice, mathematician, computer scientist; founder of ACM Transactions on Mathematical Software, and professor at Purdue University
- Steven A. Scott, president of Pittsburg State University

=== Art and architecture ===
- Tomur Atagök, feminist painter, musicologist, and author
- Chester Gould, cartoonist and creator of the Dick Tracy comic strip
- Randy Heckenkemper, golf course architect
- Regina Holliday, artist, medical rights advocate, and founder of the Walking Gallery and the Medical Advocacy Mural Project
- Donald Sechrest (1956), golf course architect
- Jerry Slack, golf course architect

=== Business ===
- Yussur A. F. Abrar, governor of the Central Bank of Somalia
- Minnie Lou Bradley, cattlewoman and matriarch of Bradley 3 Ranch in Childress County, Texas
- Walter Clore, viticulturist for Chateau Ste. Michelle; the "father of Washington wine"
- Gordon Eubanks, CEO and president of Symantec Corporation, makers of Norton AntiVirus
- John D. Groendyke, CEO of Groendyke Transport
- Clark Hallren, managing director of Clear Scope Partners; managing director of the Entertainment Industries Group of JPMorgan
- Abdusalam H. Omer, governor of the Central Bank of Somalia; CEO for the District of Columbia Public Schools
- Neal Patterson, CEO of Cerner Corporation
- T. Boone Pickens, business magnate and financier
- William A. Scroggs, insurance agent; founder of Kappa Kappa Psi
- M. B. "Bud" Seretean, CEO of Coronet Industries, general manager of the Atlanta Hawks
- Sanjiv Sidhu, founder of software giants i2 Technologies and o9 Solutions
- Tambra Raye Stevenson, nutritionist, founder and CEO of Women Advancing Nutrition, Dietetics, and Agriculture
- Charles Watson, chairman, founder, and CEO of Dynegy Corp.; owner of the Houston Aeros professional hockey team

=== Entertainment ===
- Keith Anderson, country music singer, songwriter
- John Ashley, producer (The A-Team, Walker, Texas Ranger)
- Hoyt Axton, noted rock and folk singer-songwriter and actor
- K. K. Barrett, Academy Award-nominated production designer
- Jason Boland, country music singer, songwriter
- Garth Brooks, country music singer, songwriter and actor
- Gary Busey, actor
- Jaime Cardriche, actor (Malcolm & Eddie)
- Sarah Coburn, operatic soprano
- Jay Daniel, television producer
- Burr DeBenning, film, television and stage actor
- Ty England, country music singer
- Dave Garrett, New Orleans Saints and Dallas Cowboys radio broadcaster
- Doug Gottlieb, ESPN analyst and syndicated sports talk radio host
- Brandon Jenkins, singer-songwriter
- Siddika Kabir, cooking show host and cookbook author
- Trey Kennedy, comedian, actor, singer
- Ted Leitner, San Diego Padres radio broadcaster
- Rex Linn, actor
- James Marsden, actor and model
- A. Frank Martin, musician, educator, and founding member of Kappa Kappa Psi
- Sharron Miller, television producer, director, and writer
- Kinga Philipps, actor, television host
- Steve Ripley, country-rock artist and guitarist
- Lise Simms, television actress and designer
- Watermelon Slim, born Bill Homans, blues artist
- Emily Wickersham, actress

=== Law ===
- Tina Glory-Jordan, Cherokee Nation supreme court justice, secretary of state, tribal councilor
- Anita Hill, lawyer, professor and commentator
- M. John Kane, chief justice of the Oklahoma Supreme Court
- Steven W. Taylor, Oklahoma Supreme Court justice

=== Literature and journalism ===
- June Burn, pioneering magazine writer and author
- Ally Carter, author
- Aaron Gwyn, short story author and literary critic
- Helen Holmes, journalist, historian, and Women's Army Corps officer
- Pamela Morsi, author
- Larry Thompson, humor columnist, author
- Clifford Trafzer, historian and writer

=== Military ===
- John W. Doucette, brig. general, US Air Force
- Walter E. Fountain, United States Army brigadier general, assistant adjutant general of the Oklahoma Army National Guard, acting deputy director of the Army National Guard
- Roger A. Lalich, U.S. National Guard general
- Sidney Marks, major general, United States Army
- Virgil A. Richard, brig. general, US Army
- Ray L. Smith, major general, retired, United States Marine Corps; inductee of the Oklahoma Military Hall of Fame

=== Politics ===
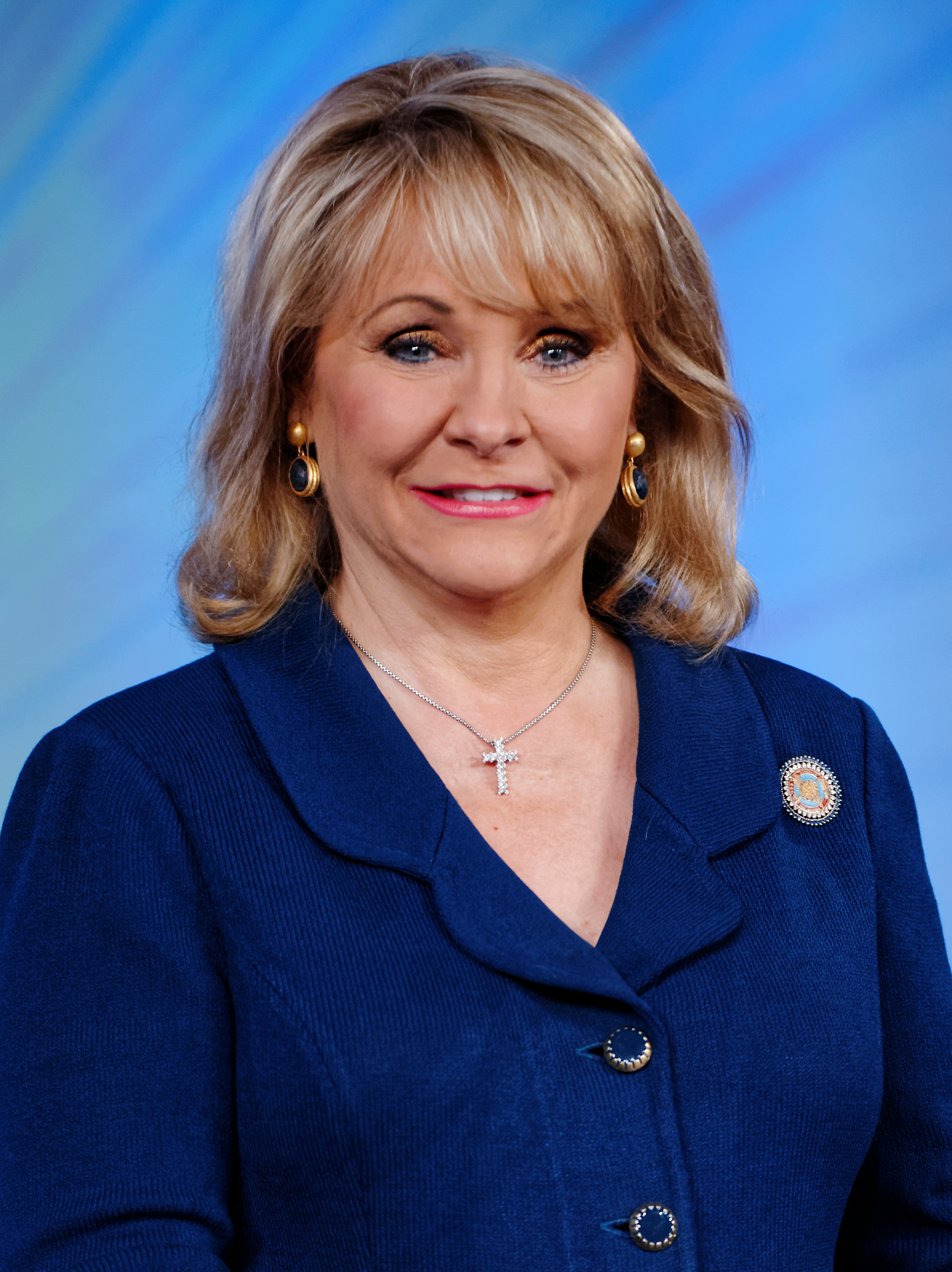
Mary Fallin

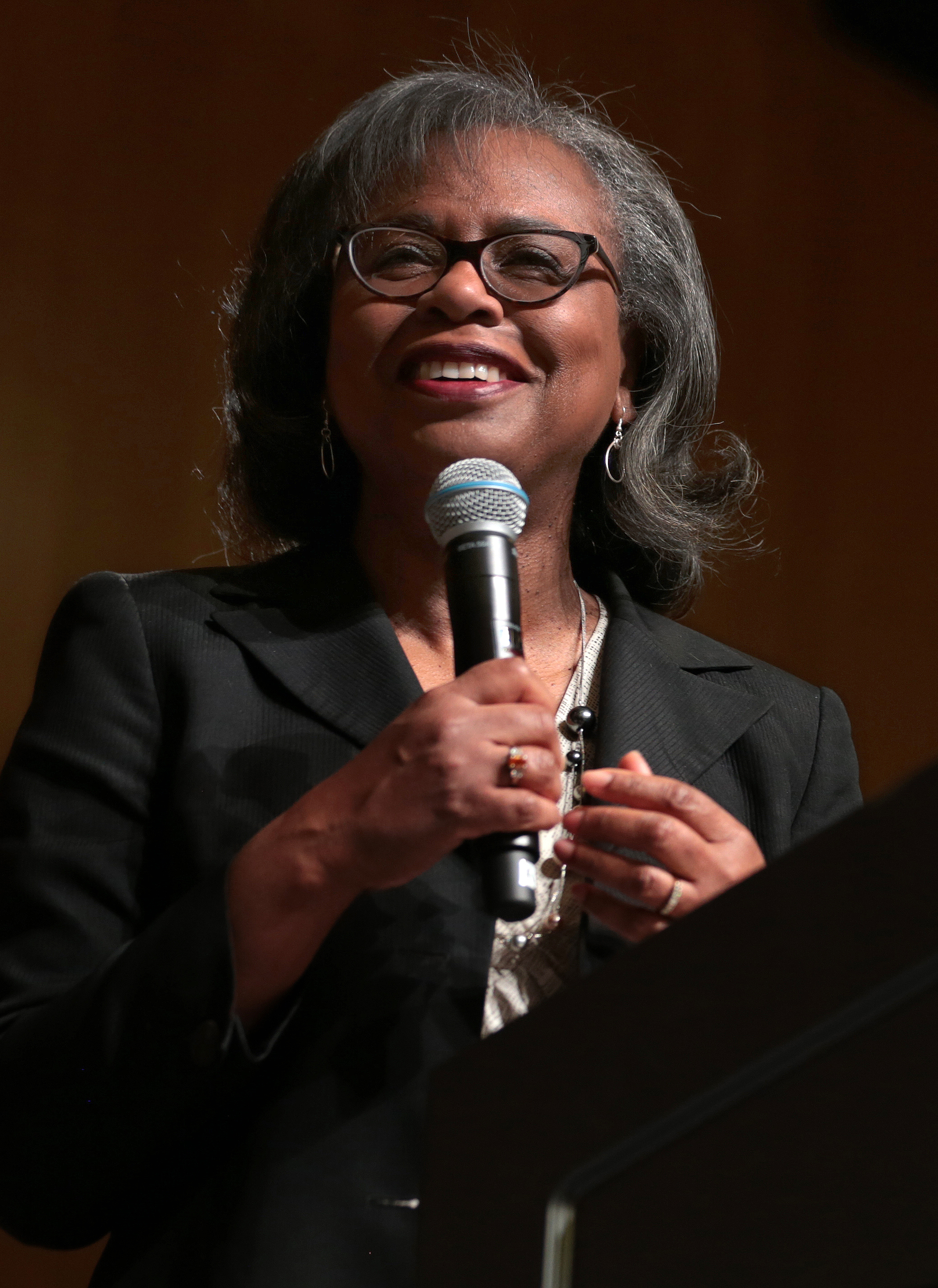
Anita Hill

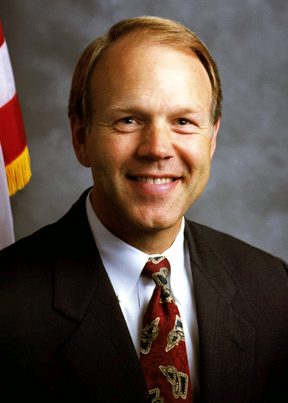
Don Nickles

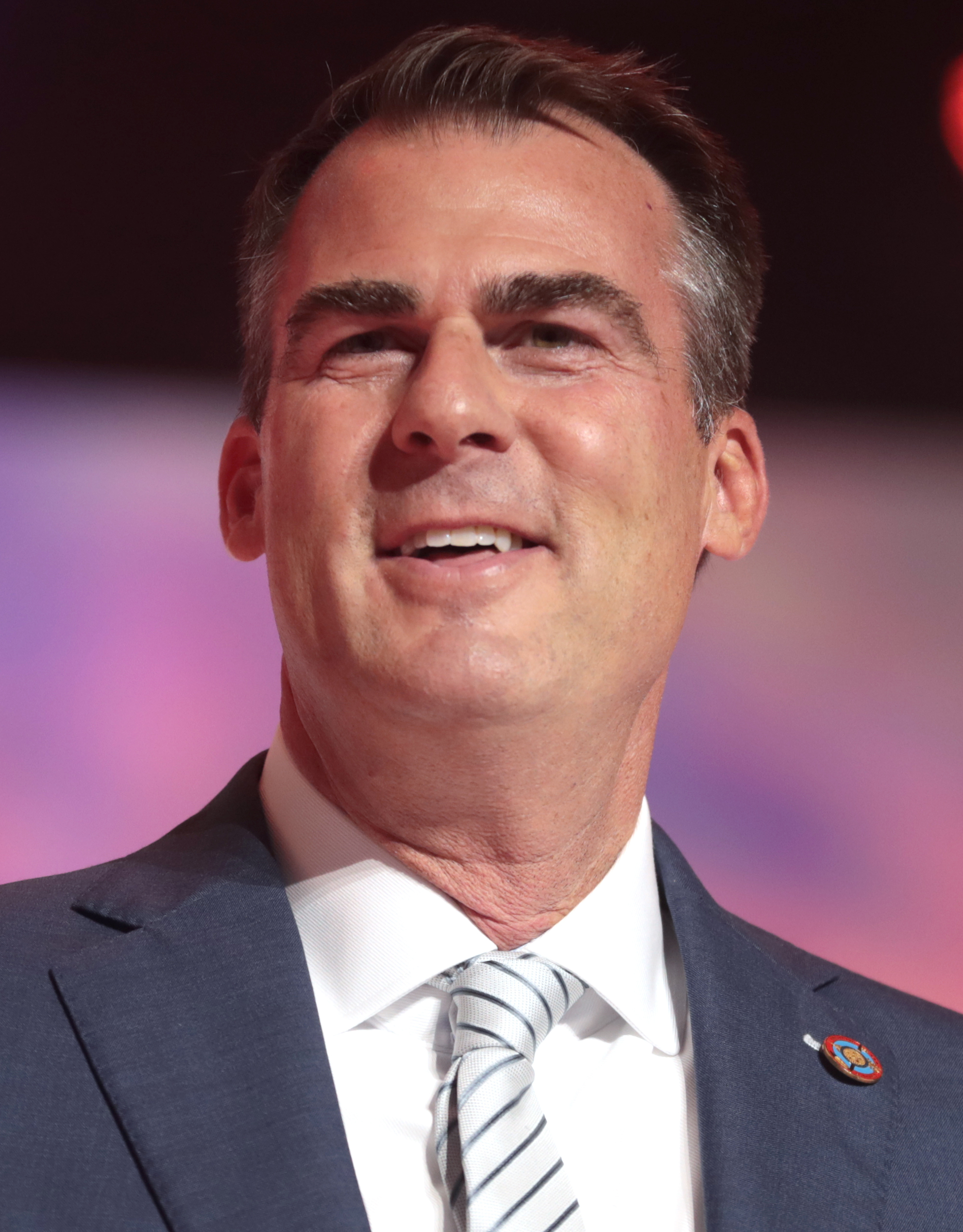
Kevin Stitt

- Joe Allbaugh, Federal Emergency Management Agency director
- Adnan Badran, prime minister of Jordan
- Henry Bellmon, United States Senate and governor of Oklahoma
- Shella Bowlin, Cherokee Nation Secretary of State
- Francis Cherry, governor of Arkansas
- Tom Coburn, United States Senate
- Nam Duck-woo, prime minister of South Korea
- Mary Fallin, governor of Oklahoma
- Ashley Grant, Cherokee Nation tribal councilor
- John Paul Hammerschmidt, United States House representative, Arkansas
- Ali Hamsa, chief secretary to the Government of Malaysia
- Joel Hefley, United States House representative, 5th District of Colorado
- Hossein Kazempour Ardebili, Iranian diplomat and OPEC representative
- Frank Lucas, United States House representative, 3rd District of Oklahoma
- Clem McSpadden, United States House representative, Oklahoma
- Markwayne Mullin, United States Senate; United States House representative, Oklahoma
- Don Nickles, United States Senate
- Robert Dale Price, United States House representative, Texas Panhandle
- Jim Reese, member of the Oklahoma House of Representatives and commissioner of the Oklahoma Department of Agriculture
- William Royer, United States House representative, California
- Kevin Stitt, current governor of Oklahoma
- Richard A. Waterfield, late state representative from Canadian, Texas
- Wes Watkins, United States House representative, Oklahoma
- Robert A. Whitney, acting surgeon general of the United States

=== Religion ===
- Alan J. Hawkins, Anglican bishop and COO of the Anglican Church in North America
- William B. Oden, American Methodist bishop

=== Science, technology and engineering ===
- Horace Casey, electrical engineer
- Wally Funk, first female Federal Aviation Administration and National Transportation Safety Board inspector; one of the Mercury 13; oldest woman in space as of July 2021
- William Pogue, ret. colonel, USAF, NASA astronaut, pilot of Skylab 4
- John R. Rice, mathematician and computer scientist; founder of ACM Transactions on Mathematical Software
- Dr. H. Edward Roberts, engineer and inventor of the personal computer
- Stuart Roosa, NASA astronaut, Apollo 14
- Ingrid Skop, pro-life obstetrician
- Wei-Wen Yu, civil engineer

=== Sports ===
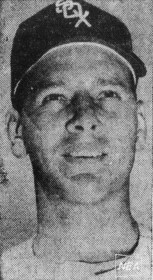
Joe Horlen

==== Baseball ====
- Jerry Adair, professional baseball player and coach
- Scott Baker, MLB pitcher, Minnesota Twins
- Jeromy Burnitz, MLB baseball player
- John Farrell, manager of 2013 World Series champion Boston Red Sox
- Josh Fields, MLB baseball player, Royals
- Joe Horlen, MLB All-Star pitcher
- Pete Incaviglia, MLB baseball player, Baseball America and Collegiate Baseball newspaper College Baseball Player of the Century
- Danny Perez, MLB outfielder, Milwaukee Brewers
- Allie Reynolds, MLB pitcher
- Rusty Ryal, current MLB infielder, Arizona Diamondbacks
- Luke Scott, current MLB outfielder, Baltimore Orioles
- Mickey Tettleton, MLB baseball player
- Robin Ventura, MLB baseball player
- Donnie Walton, current MLB infielder, Seattle Mariners
- Gary Ward, baseball coach

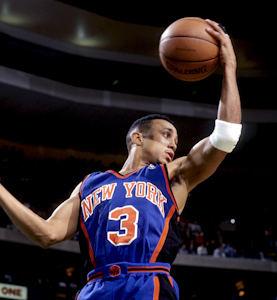
John Starks

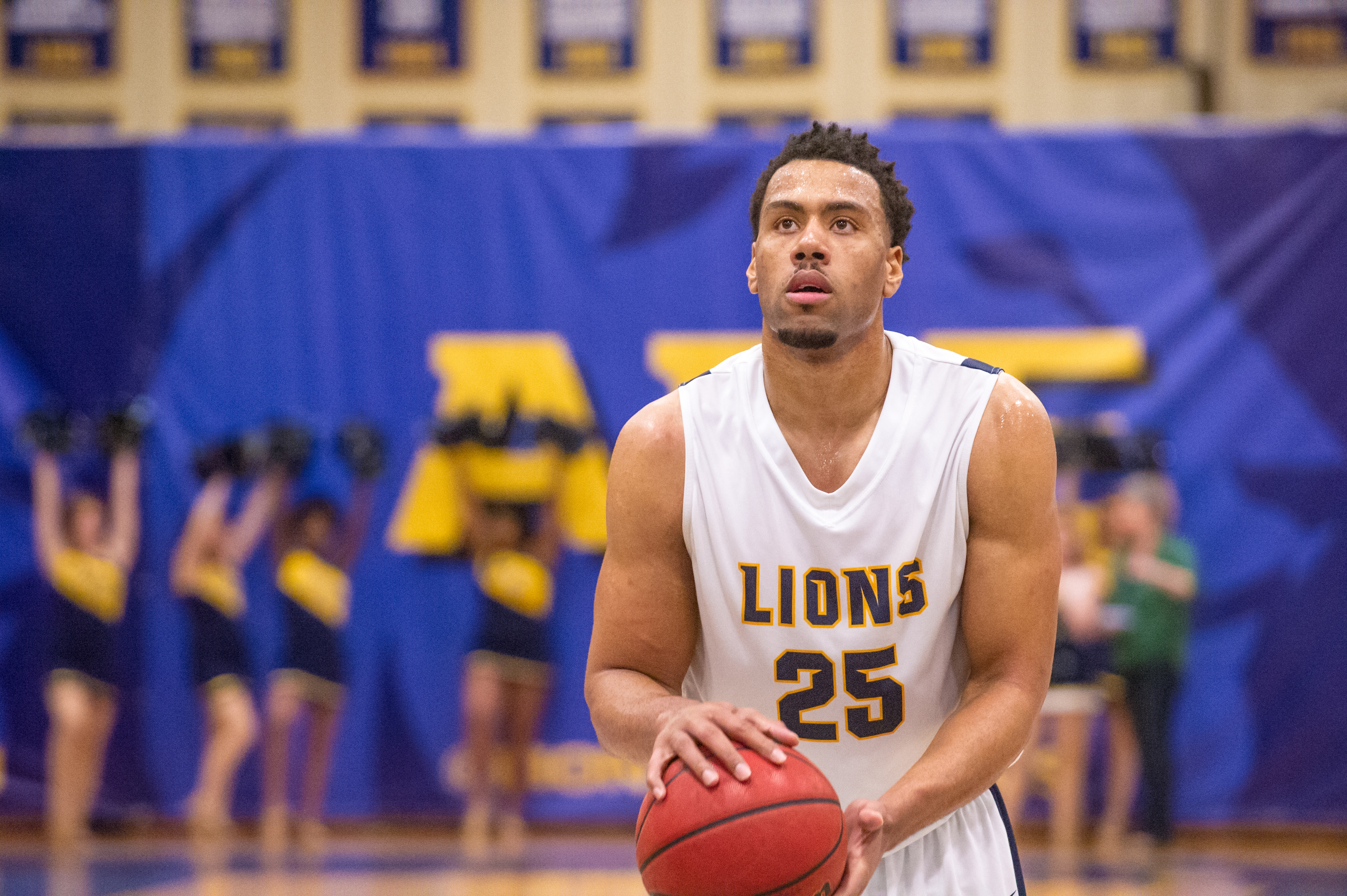
Darrell Williams

==== Basketball ====
- Tony Allen, NBA basketball player, New Orleans Pelicans
- Markel Brown (born 1992), basketball player in the Israeli Basketball Premier League
- Michael Cobbins (born 1992), basketball player for Maccabi Haifa of the Israeli Basketball Premier League
- Pete Darcey, NBA basketball player
- Marcus Dove, basketball player
- Joey Graham, NBA basketball player, Toronto Raptors
- Bob Harris, NBA basketball player
- Don Haskins, NCAA men's basketball coach, University of Texas at El Paso, subject of the movie Glory Road
- Anthony Hickey (born 1992), basketball player for Hapoel Haifa in the Israeli Basketball Premier League
- Henry Iba, NCAA and Olympic champion basketball coach, National Basketball Hall of Fame member
- Moe Iba, Nebraska Cornhuskers men's basketball coach
- Bob Kurland, basketball, two-time NCAA Champion, two-time Olympic Champion, Hall of Fame
- John Lucas, current NBA basketball player, Houston Rockets
- Desmond Mason, NBA basketball player, Oklahoma City Thunder
- Bud Millikan, basketball coach of University of Maryland, College Park
- Le'Bryan Nash, basketball player in the Israeli Basketball Premier League
- Doyle Parrack, NBA basketball player, and NCAA coach
- Bryant Reeves, NBA basketball player, Vancouver Grizzlies
- Bill Self, current NCAA basketball head coach, University of Kansas; head coach Oral Roberts University, University of Tulsa, University of Illinois
- Marcus Smart, current NBA player for the Boston Celtics, 6th overall draft pick in 2014
- John Starks, Oklahoma State basketball player, New York Knicks guard
- Eddie Sutton, men's basketball head coach at several schools, among them Oklahoma State
- Scott Sutton, head coach of Oral Roberts University basketball
- Sean Sutton, head coach of Oklahoma State University basketball
- Lindy Waters III, Oklahoma State basketball player, current Oklahoma City Thunder guard
- Darrell Williams, basketball player for Hapoel Tel Aviv of the Israeli Premier League
- Toby Wynn (2001), head women's basketball coach for Emporia State University

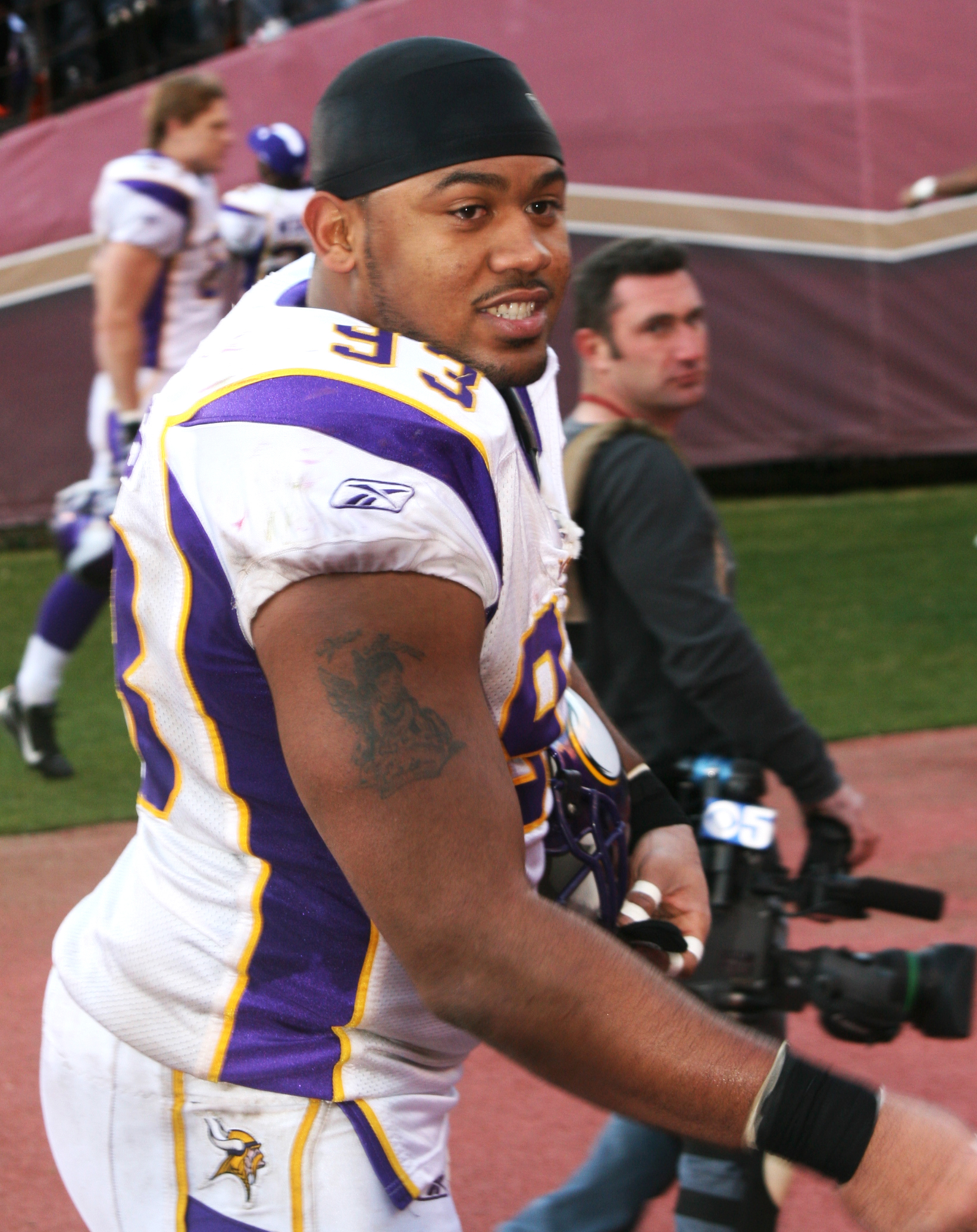
Kevin Williams

==== Football ====
- Dan Bailey, current NFL football player, free agent
- Harold Bailey, NFL and CFL player
- Tatum Bell, NFL football player
- Bo Bowling, Montreal Alouettes player
- Jordan Brailford, NFL outside linebacker, Washington Redskins
- Rod Brown, All-American football player
- Dez Bryant, NFL wide receiver for the Dallas Cowboys
- Keith Burns, NFL football player, Denver Broncos
- Kelly Cook, NFL football player, Green Bay Packers
- Mason Cox, current Australian rules football player with Collingwood of the Australian Football League
- Gary Darnell, college football coach
- Reuben Gant, NFL football player, Buffalo Bills
- Walt Garrison, Pro Bowl NFL football player, Dallas Cowboys
- Jason Gildon, Pro Bowl NFL football player, Pittsburgh Steelers
- Chad Glasgow, defensive coordinator for the Texas Tech Red Raiders football team
- Derrel Gofourth, NFL football player, Green Bay Packers
- Mike Gundy, former head coach of Oklahoma State University football
- Brent Guy, college football coach
- Charlie Harper, NFL football player, New York Giants
- Rusty Hilger, NFL football player, Detroit Lions
- Ed Jeffers, professional football player
- Charlie Johnson, current NFL player, Super Bowl Champion 2006 Indianapolis Colts
- Howard N. "Sonny" Keys, NFL football player, Philadelphia Eagles 1960 World Champions (precursor to Super Bowl); coach of Cleveland Browns
- Joe King, NFL player, country music singer-songwriter, Cincinnati Bengals, Cleveland Browns, Tampa Bay Buccaneers, Las Vegas Raiders
- Jon Kolb, four-time Super Bowl Champion, NFL Hall of Fame
- Jacob Lacey, current NFL football player, Indianapolis Colts
- Sonny Liles, football player
- John Little, NFL football player, New York Jets
- Dexter Manley, Pro Bowl NFL football player, Washington Redskins
- Aaron McConnell, football player
- R. W. McQuarters, NFL football player, New York Giants
- Vernand Morency, current NFL football player, Green Bay Packers
- Houston Nutt, current NCAA football head coach, University of Mississippi
- Leslie O'Neal, Pro Bowl NFL football player, San Diego Chargers
- Bill Owen, NFL football player, New York Giants
- Frank Parker, NFL football player, Cleveland Browns
- Juqua Parker, NFL football player, Philadelphia Eagles
- Jim Parmer, NFL football player, Philadelphia Eagles
- Kevin Peterson, football player
- Lenzy Pipkins, football player
- Dean Prater, NFL football player, Buffalo Bills
- Buddy Ryan, NFL defensive coordinator and head coach of the Chicago Bears
- Barry Sanders, Heisman Trophy winner, NFL football player, Detroit Lions; Hall of Famer
- Jerry Sherk, Pro Bowl NFL football player, Cleveland Browns
- Antonio Smith, Pro Bowl NFL football player, Houston Texans
- Lane Taylor, current NFL player, Green Bay Packers
- Thurman Thomas, NFL football player, Buffalo Bills; Hall of Famer
- Leonard Thompson, NFL football player, Detroit Lions
- Jim Turner, NFL player
- Orville Tuttle, Pro Bowl NFL football player, New York Giants
- John Ward, NFL football player, Minnesota Vikings
- John Washington, NFL football player, New York Giants
- Brandon Weeden, current NFL football player, Dallas Cowboys
- Reggie White, NFL player
- Darrent Williams, NFL football player, Denver Broncos
- Jamal Williams, Pro Bowl NFL football player, San Diego Chargers
- Kevin Williams, current Pro Bowl NFL football player, Minnesota Vikings
- Duane Wood, AFL All-Star football player, Kansas City Chiefs
- Rashaun Woods, NFL football player, San Francisco 49ers
- Kenyatta Wright, NFL football player, New York Jets

==== Golf ====
- Danny Edwards, professional golfer with the PGA Tour
- David Edwards, professional golfer with the PGA Tourr
- Rickie Fowler, professional golfer
- Mark Hayes,professional golfer with the PGA Tour and Senior PGA Tour
- Morgan Hoffmann, professional golfer
- Mike Holder, men's golf coach and current athletic director
- Viktor Hovland, professional golfer with the PGA Tour and FedEx Cup Champion
- Charles Howell III, professional golfer with the PGA Tour
- Edward Loar, professional golfer
- Hunter Mahan, professional golfer with the PGA Tour
- Caroline Masson, professional golfer
- Alexander Norén, professional golfer
- Maja Stark, professional golfer on the LPGA Tour and Ladies European Tour; 2025 U.S. Women's Open champion
- Doug Tewell, professional golfer with the PGA Tour and Senior PGA Tour
- Bob Tway, professional golfer with the PGA Tour
- Peter Uihlein, professional golfer
- Bo Van Pelt, professional golfer
- Scott Verplank, professional golfer with the PGA Tour
- Brian Watts, professional golfer with the PGA Tour
- Casey Wittenberg, professional golfer with the PGA Tour

==== Mixed martial arts ====
- Daniel Cormier, mixed martial artist, current UFC Light Heavyweight & Heavyweight Champion; Olympic wrestler, NCAA runner-up
- Don Frye, wrestled during OSU NCAA Championship in 1989, mixed martial artist in Pride Fighting Championships and the UFC
- Johny Hendricks, retired professional mixed martial artist; UFC Welterweight Champion; two-time NCAA Wrestling Champion (2005, 2006)
- Muhammed Lawal, MMA fighter
- Steve Mocco, professional MMA fighter; 2005 NCAA Division I Champion at heavyweight wrestler; 2008 Olympic team member
- Mark Muñoz, retired professional mixed martial artist, UFC middleweight, two-time wrestling All-American, NCAA Champion in 2001

==== Wrestling ====
- Adnan Al-Kaissie, pro wrestler and manager
- Gerald Brisco, pro wrestler
- Jack Brisco, pro wrestler, two-time NWA World Heavyweight Champion
- Randy Couture, three-time All-American wrestler; UFC Heavyweight and Light Heavyweight Champion, and UFC Hall of Fame member
- Kendall Cross, three-time All-American wrestler, won the NCAA National Championship in 1989, gold medalist in wrestling at 57 kg in 1996
- Alex Dieringer, three-time NCAA Champion wrestler
- Edward C. Gallagher, cformer wrestling coach; winningest coach in NCAA wrestling history, Olympic wrestling coach, National Wrestling Hall of Fame charter member
- Dick Hutton, pro wrestler, NWA World's Heavyweight Championship
- Leroy McGuirk, pro wrestler and promoter; three-time NWA World Light Heavyweight Champion
- Steve Mocco, 2005 NCAA Division I Champion at heavyweight wrestler; 2008 Olympic team member; current professional MMA fighter
- Kenny Monday, three-time Olympic wrestler – 1988 welterweight gold medalist and 1992 welterweight silver medalist; 2x NCAA champion
- Mark Muñoz, retired professional mixed martial artist, UFC middleweight, two-time wrestling All-American, NCAA Champion in 2001
- Ray Murphy, Jr., wrestler; developer of handicapped-assisting technologies; recipient of Medal of Courage from the National Wrestling Hall of Fame
- Shane Roller, three-time All-American wrestler; retired MMA fighter
- Jake Rosholt, three-time NCAA champion wrestler, retired MMA fighter
- Jared Rosholt, NCAA All-American wrestler; professional mixed martial artist with the PFL
- Dave Schultz, three-time NCAA Champion, Olympic and world champion wrestler
- John Smith, current head coach of Oklahoma State University wrestling, two-time NCAA champion, 4X World and 2X Olympic gold medal winner, National Wrestling Hall of Fame member
- Pat Smith, first four-time NCAA D1 Champion wrestler

==== Other sports ====
- Carrie-Lynn Cohen, tennis player
- Shane Drury, rodeo bull-rider
- Vickie Gates, IFBB professional bodybuilder
- John Juanda, professional poker player, winner of 5 World Series of Poker bracelets
- John Ray Webster, checkers champion

== Faculty and administration ==
=== Presidents ===
Since 1891, 20 people have served as president of Oklahoma State University or its predecessors, with an additional two people serving in an acting or interim capacity. The most recent person to hold the office is Jim Hess who was appointed the 20th OSU president in 2025 after serving in an interim capacity.

=== Notable and current faculty ===
- Girish Saran Agarwal, physicist
- Ai, poet; member of OSU English faculty until her death
- Hilton Briggs, president of South Dakota State University
- Elliott D. Canonge, linguist specializing in Native American cultures
- Robert P. Celarier, leading botanist and agrostologist
- Alfred Corn, poet
- Angie Debo, leading historian of Oklahoma and Native Americans; curator of maps for Oklahoma A&M library, 1947–1955; left her papers to OSU Library
- J. Frank Dobie, author; folklorist; taught English at OSU; most remembered for his service at the University of Texas at Austin
- Brian Evenson, academic and writer of both literary fiction and popular fiction
- Wolt Fabrycky, industrial engineering scholar
- Bryan P. Glass, mammalogist
- Elbert Glover, public health expert
- Edward Goljan, medical educator
- Toni Graham, fiction writer
- Jack Harlan, agronomist
- Riffat Hassan, Pakistani-American religious scholar notable for her studies of Islamic feminism
- Helen Holmes, journalist, historian, and Women's Army Corps officer
- William Jaco, mathematician; discovered the JSJ decomposition
- George Judge, economist
- Subhash Kak, computer scientist and public intellectual
- Sheldon Katz, mathematician and string theorist (now at the University of Illinois)
- Nicholas A. Kotov, noted chemical engineering professor (now professor at University of Michigan)
- Edmon Low, pioneering university librarian
- Bohumil Makovsky, director of bands; "the Guiding Spirit of Kappa Kappa Psi"
- Robert W. MacVicar, president of Oregon State University
- J. Tinsley Oden, pioneering scholar of engineering (now at University of Texas)
- Aimee Parkison, short story writer and novelist
- Christine Salmon,architect
- Mike Sowell, journalist and sportswriter
- Robert Sternberg, one of the twenty most-cited psychologists of the 20th century
- N.V.V.J. Swamy, mathematical physicist
- Paul J. Tikalsky, civil engineer
- Elsayed Elsayed Wagih, inventor of the zymoblot
- Joseph W. Westphal, political scientist, educator, and U.S. under secretary of the Army

=== Former and current athletic staff ===
- Larry Coker, coach of University of Miami
- Butch Davis, coach of University of Miami and Cleveland Browns
- Rickie Fowler, current player in the PGA
- Edward C. Gallagher, wrestling and track and field coach, physical education professor and athletic director
- Mike Gundy, former head coach of Oklahoma State University football
- Leonard Hamilton, current coach of Florida State Seminoles basketball
- Labron Harris, first golf coach at Oklahoma State University
- Henry Iba, basketball coach and athletic director
- Jimmy Johnson, current Fox sports analyst; coach of Dallas Cowboys and Miami Dolphins; spokesman for Extenze
- Les Miles, Former head football coach of LSU
- Doyle Parrack, won national basketball championship under Henry Iba in 1945; assistant coach under Iba; head women's basketball coach, 1978–80
- Oail Andrew "Bum" Phillips, NFL head coach of Houston Oilers; assistant coach under Jim Stanley
- John Smith, current head coach of Oklahoma State University wrestling, two-time NCAA champion, 4X World and 2X Olympic gold medal winner, National Wrestling Hall of Fame member
- Eddie Sutton, basketball coach (also alumnus)
- Dave Wannstedt, current coach of Pittsburgh Panthers; coach of Chicago Bears and Miami Dolphins

== See also ==
- List of Oklahoma State University Olympians
