= Comanche language =

Uto-Aztecan language spoken by the Comanche people in the United States

Comanche
- Nʉmʉ Tekwapʉ̲
- Pronunciation: [ˈnɨmɨ ˈtekʷapɨ̥]
- Native to: United States
- Region: Oklahoma (formerly, Texas, New Mexico, Kansas, Colorado, Oklahoma)
- Ethnicity: Comanche
- Native speakers: <9 (2022)
- Language family: Uto-Aztecan: Numic; Central Numic; Comanche

Language codes
- ISO 639-3: com
- Glottolog: coma1245
- ELP: Comanche
- Linguasphere: 65-AAB-bh
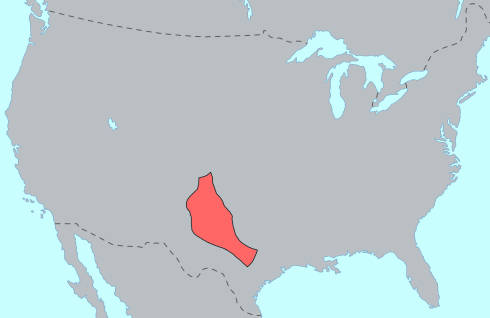
- Former distribution of the Comanche language.

- Comanche is classified as Severely Endangered by the UNESCO Atlas of the World's Languages in Danger.

Nʉmʉ / Kɨmantsi "Person" / "Enemy, stranger"
- Person: Nʉmʉ
- People: Nʉmʉnʉʉ (Comanche)
- Language: Nʉmʉ Tekwapʉ̲ Mootekwaʔpʉ̠ (Hand Talk)
- Country: Nʉmʉnʉʉ Sookobitʉ (Comancheria)

Comanche (English: /kəˈmæntʃi/, endonym Nʉmʉ Tekwapʉ̲) is a Uto-Aztecan language spoken by the Comanche, who split from the Shoshone soon after the Comanche had acquired horses around 1705. The Comanche language and the Shoshoni language are quite similar, but certain consonant changes in Comanche have inhibited mutual intelligibility.

The name Comanche comes from the Ute word kɨmantsi "enemy, stranger". Their own name for the language is nʉmʉ tekwapʉ, which means "language of the people".

== Use and revitalization efforts ==
Although efforts are now being made to ensure its survival, most speakers of the language are elderly. In the late 19th century, Comanche children were placed in indigenous boarding schools where they were discouraged from speaking their native language, and even severely punished for doing so. The second generation then grew up speaking English, because of the belief that it was better for them not to know Comanche.

The Comanche language was briefly prominent during World War II. A group of 17 young men referred to as the Comanche Code Talkers were trained, and used by the U.S. Army to send messages conveying sensitive information in the Comanche language so that it could not be deciphered by the enemy.

In July 2013, The Boston Globe reported that there were roughly 25–30 native speakers of the language. The Comanche Language and Cultural Preservation Committee offers dictionaries and language-learning materials. Comanche language courses were available at the now-closed Comanche Nation College. The college previously conducted a language-recording project, as the language is "mostly oral", and emphasized instruction for tribal members. On the language-learning platform Memrise, the Comanche Nation Language Department has published learning materials.

As of 2022, there were fewer than nine fluent native speakers of Comanche, many of the group having succumbed to old age, health problems, or the COVID-19 pandemic.

== Phonology ==
=== Vowels ===
Comanche has a typical Numic vowel inventory of six vowels. In addition, there is the common diphthong /ai/. Historically, there was a certain amount of free variation between [ai] and [e] (as shown by comparison with Shoshoni cognates), but the variation is no longer so common and most morphemes have become fixed on either /ai/ or /e/. In the following chart, the basic symbols given are in the IPA, whereas the equivalent symbols in the conventional orthography are given to the right of them.

	Front		Central		Back	
	short	long	short	long	short	long
High (close)	i	iː ⟨ii⟩	ɨ ⟨ʉ⟩	ɨː ⟨ʉʉ⟩	u	uː ⟨uu⟩
Mid	e	eː ⟨ee⟩			o	oː ⟨oo⟩
Low (open)			a	aː ⟨aa⟩		

==== Vowel length and voicing ====
Comanche distinguishes vowels by length. Vowels can be either long or short. Long vowels are never devoiced and in the orthography they are represented as (aa, ee, ii, oo, uu, ʉʉ). An example of a long vowel is the (ee) in [wakaréʔeː] 'turtle'. Short vowels can be lengthened when they are stressed.

Short vowels can be either voiced or voiceless. Unstressed short vowels are usually devoiced when /s/ or /h/ follows and optionally when word-final. Voiceless vowels are non-phonemic and therefore not represented in this chart. In the conventional orthography, these vowels are marked with an underline: ⟨a̱, e̱, i̱, o̱, u̱, ʉ̱⟩.

=== Consonants ===
Comanche has a typical Numic consonant inventory. As with the vowel charts, the basic symbols given in this chart are in the IPA, whereas the equivalent symbols in the conventional orthography are given to the right of them.

	Labial	Dental	Palatal	Velar		Glottal
	Labial	Dental	Palatal	plain	labial	Glottal
Nasal	m	n				
Plosive	p	t		k	kʷ ⟨kw⟩	ʔ
Affricate		ts				
Fricative		s				h
Approximant			j ⟨y⟩		w	

=== Stress ===
Comanche stress most commonly falls on the first syllable. Exceptions to this rule, such as in the words Waʔsáasiʔ 'Osage people', and aná 'ouch!', are marked with an acute accent.

For the purposes of stress placement, the diphthongs /ai/, /oi/, and /ui/ act as one vowel with one mora. Additionally, possessive pronouns, which serve as proclitics, do not affect the stress of a word, so that nʉ + námi 'my sister' retains its stress on the /a/ in námi

Secondary stress is placed on the second syllable of a two-syllable word; the third syllable of a word with three, four, or five syllables; and the fourth syllable of a word with six syllables.

- Primary stress: Primary stress is "marked when it is non-initial stress". In addition, "when a pronoun is suffixed by, for instance a postposition, the pronoun does take primary – and initial – stress". An example is [nɨpía] nʉ-pia 'my mother' (my-mother). In the following data where primary stress appears, it will be shown with an "acute accent". Primary stress is found in words or compounds of three, five, and six syllables. However, when primary stress is marked in a third syllable, it can also be considered an example of secondary stress according to Canonge, but an "exception to this case is when both a proclitic and prefix are used". An example of third-syllable stress is [há.bi+hu.píː.tu] 'stopped and lay down'. Words with "five syllables have primary stress on the first syllable". An example is [ká.wo+nò.ka.tu] 'stress'. Words with six syllables also have primary stress on the first syllable. An example is [kú.ʔi.na.kù.ʔe.tu] 'roasts for'.
- Non-initial stress: Non-initial stress can be found in any syllable of a word that is not in the initial position; it can also fall on a long vowel. The "initial syllable never weakens to the point of voicelessness". However, some exceptions to non-initial stress are animal and plant names, because some of them end with a stressed long vowel plus which is represented by ʔ. "Loans are common sources of words with non-initial stress", an example being [pirísiː] pitísii 'policeman'. A word with two stresses is [ánikúra] ánikúta 'ant' (analysis unknown).
- Alternating stress: Alternating stress occurs when there are words with three, four, five, and six syllables. In addition, alternating stress arises "when nouns of compound are coequal, a root or stem has one-syllable suffix". Also, prefixes or not stem-changes do not receive an initial stress because the alternating stress "begins on the second syllable as in the following word of six syllables, following the pattern of five-syllable words", for example: [wu.hká.ʔa.mí.ʔanu] 'went to cut down'. Examples of alternating stress are:

4	5	6
[á.ni.múi]	[yú.pu.sí.a]	[wuh+tú.pu káʔ]
'housefly'	'louse'	'buckle, button'

An example of three words is [wáhkát ìmat òʔiàt] 'twelve' (lit. waha+-?? 'two-??').

- Stress shift: Stress shift occurs when "verbs often exhibit stylistic stress shift when occurring at the end of a breathing group". In addition, stress moves "one syllable to the right if that syllable is voiced; otherwise it skips over the voiceless vowels to the next syllable". An example is [pohínu] 'jumped'. According to Charney, stress shift is caused by a suffixed -n which prompts a "rightward shift of stress in form with the shape CVHCV or CVhV".

CVHCV	CVhv
[marohtíkʷan]	[pahín]
ma-toH-tíkwa-n	pahi-n
'he hit him'	'he fell'.

By using the form CVHCV or CVhV, we can see that -h "is presented as a second or a precipitated consonant". However, "stress does not shift rightwards when the verb root does not contain [h]. An example is [nómiʔan] no-miʔa-n 'they moved camp'.

=== Phonological processes ===
- Free variation: although not often reflected in the orthography, certain sounds occur in free variation. For instance, /j/ can be pronounced as a [dʒ] (for example: ma yaa [ma dʒaː]), and a labialized /k/ can be voiced (as in nʉ gwʉhʉ: it is written gw, even though it is more accurately /ɡʷ/, just as the labialized /k/ is written in Comanche as kw rather than /kʷ/). In contemporary times, preaspiration and preglottalization may occur in free variation with a long vowel: aakaaʔ / ahkaaʔ ('devil's horn').
- Spirantization: spirantization can occur in the phonemes /p/ and /t/ when they are preceded by vowels. /p/ becomes the voiced bilabial fricative, [β], usually written as a b, and /t/ becomes the voiced alveolar tap, [ɾ], written as an r. An intervening /ʔ/ does not block this spirantization process, as seen in tuaʔbaʔa 'on the son' (the sound [β] is written here as b, and is allophonic with the Comanche /p/). In the past, there was a process of nasalization in Comanche which has since been lost and which blocked spirantization; certain words that would otherwise exhibit spirantization in modern Comanche do not, therefore, as a result of the historical presence of what would have been a preceding nasal (ʉ papi 'your head' would historically have been ʉn papi).
- Metathesis: A fairly regular process of metathesis occurs, sporadically with voiceless consonants and regularly with voiced consonants. It is accompanied by the deletion of a vowel: otʉnhʉh > orʉhʉ > ohrʉ ('they', dual). In modern Comanche, voiceless, unaspirated stops followed by a long /ɨ/ (written ʉ) and an /h/ may be realized as aspirated equivalents at the expense of the subsequent long vowel and [h]: pitsipʉ̱ha > pitsipʰa ('milk').
- Preaspiration and Preglottalization: Certain consonants undergo preaspiration word medially, namely, /n/ and the voiceless, unaspirated stops /p/, /t/, and /k/ (rendered in the IPA as [ʰn], [ʰp], [ʰt], [ʰk], respectively). It is usually written with an h before the consonant, as in aworahna 'cupboard' or ekasahpanaʔ 'soldier'. Similarly, many of the same consonants can also undergo preglottalization, which is written with ʔ before the consonant (resulting in the digraphs ʔn, ʔb, ʔw, and ʔr), as in hunuʔbiʔ 'creek' or taʔwoʔiʔ 'gun'.
- Organic and Inorganic Devoicing: each Comanche vowel has an allophonic voiceless (or "whispered") equivalent. The devoicing process in Comanche follows a predictable pattern, and can be broken down into two categories—organic (compulsory) and inorganic (optional).
  - A vowel which precedes an /s/ or an /h/ undergoes induced organic devoicing, provided that the vowel is unstressed, short, and not part of a cluster (contrast sitʉ̱suʔa, 'this one also', which undergoes organic devoicing, with the similar word sitʉʉsuʔa, 'these ones also', which does not because the vowel is not short). Two adjacent syllables cannot both have organic voiceless vowels. In such a situation, the second vowel does not devoice.
  - The second type of devoicing that can occur in Comanche is inorganic devoicing. Short vowels that are not part of a cluster may be optionally devoiced at the end of a breath group, and this may apply even if the preceding vowel has undergone organic devoicing. Additionally, an inorganic, voiceless vowel conditions optional lengthening of a voiced penultimate vowel if there is no intervening preaspirated consonant (for example, kaasa̲ 'wing' and oomo̲ 'leg').

== Writing system ==
The Comanche Alphabet was developed by Dr. Alice Anderton, a linguistic anthropologist, and was adopted as the official Comanche Alphabet by the Comanche Nation in 1994. The alphabet is as follows:

Letter	Pronunciation	Letter	Pronunciation	Letter	Pronunciation
a	/a/	m	/m/	t	/t/ [t]
b	/p/ [β]	n	/n/	u	/u/
e	/e/	o	/o/	ʉ	/ə/
h	/h/	p	/p/ [p]	w	/w/
i	/i/	r	/t/ [ɾ]	y	/j/
k	/k/	s	/s/	ʔ	/ʔ/

Notes:

- Long vowels are indicated by doubling the vowel: aa, ee, ii, oo, uu, ʉʉ.
- Voiceless vowels are indicated by an underline: a̱, e̱, i̱, o̱, u̱, ʉ̱.
- When the stress does not fall on the first syllable of the word, it is marked with an acute accent ´: kʉtséena 'coyote'.
- The glottal stop /ʔ/ is sometimes written as ?.
- The phonemes /ts/ and /kʷ/ are written as ts and kw, respectively.

== Morphology ==
Like many languages of the Americas, Comanche can be classified as a polysynthetic language.

=== Nouns ===
Comanche nouns are inflected for case and number, and the language possesses a dual number. Like many Uto-Aztecan languages, nouns may take an absolutive suffix. Many cases are also marked using postpositions.

Personal pronouns exist for three numbers (singular, dual, and plural) and three persons. They have different forms depending on whether or not they are the subject or object of a verb, possessive (including reflexive possessive forms), or the object of a postposition. Like many languages of the Americas, Comanche first-person plural pronouns have both inclusive and exclusive forms.

The Comanche paradigm for nominal number suffixes is illustrated below (in the practical orthography):

	Subject	Object	Possessive
Dual I	-nʉkwʉh	-nʉkwʉh-ha	-nʉkwʉh-ha
Dual II	-nʉhʉ	-nihi	-nʉhʉ
Plural	-nʉʉ	-nii	-nʉʉ

Notes:

- The objective and possessive forms differ only in their final feature: fortis is applied at the end of the possessive suffixes.
- The two dual suffixes are not technically distinct and may be used interchangeably. However, the first of the two (Dual I) is preferred for humans.
- The absolutive suffix may be dropped before the addition of these suffixes.

=== Verbs ===
Many of the verb stems regularly are suppletive: intransitive verbs are suppletive for singular versus plural subject and transitive verbs are suppletive for singular versus plural object. Verbs can take various affixes, including incorporated nouns before the stem. Most verb affixes are suffixes, except for voicing-changing prefixes and instrumental prefixes.

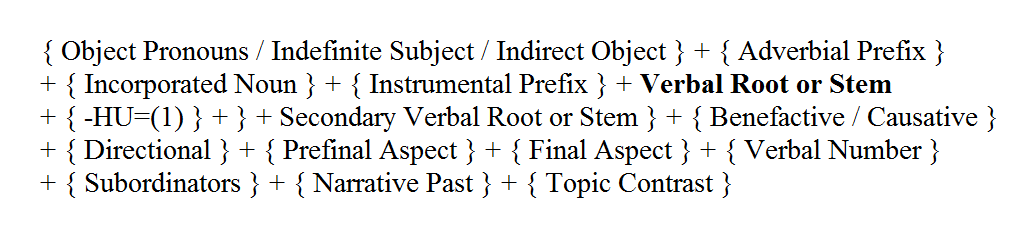
Note: -HU=(1) is a particular affix which adds the meaning 'to accomplish a goal'.

The verb stem can take a number of prefixes and suffixes. A sketch of all the elements that may be affixed to the verb is given on the right:

In addition to verbal affixes, Comanche verbs can also be augmented by other verbs. Although in principle Comanche verbs may be freely combined with other verbs, in actuality only a handful of verbs, termed auxiliary verbs, are frequently combined with others. These forms take the full range of aspectual suffixes. Common auxiliary verbs in Comanche include hani 'to do, make', naha 'to be, become', miʔa 'to go', and katʉ / yʉkwi 'to sit'. An example of how the verbs combine:

katʉ + miʔa = katʉmiʔa
{to sit} {} {to go} {} {to ride (and go)}

==== Instrumental prefixes ====
As mentioned above, Comanche has a rich repertoire of instrumental prefixes, and certain verbs (termed instrumental verbs) cannot occur without an instrumental prefix. These prefixes can affect the transitivity of a verb. The Comanche instrumental prefixes are listed below:

- kʉh- = 'with the teeth, chin, mouth'
- kuh- = 'with heat, fire'
- ma- = 'with the hand' and as a generalized instrumental
- mu- / muh = 'with the nose, lips, front'
- nih- = 'verbally'
- pih- = 'with the buttocks, rear (e.g., of a car)'
- sʉ- = 'with cold'; fortis is applied at the end of the prefix
- sʉh- = 'with the foot, in a violent motion'
- su- = 'with the mind, mental activity'; fortis is applied at the end of the prefix
- tah- = 'with the foot'
- toh- = 'with the hand, violent or completed action'
- tsah- = 'with the hand (extended to hand tools)'
- tsih- = 'with a sharp point, with the finger'
- tsoh- = 'with the head'
- wʉh- = an all-purpose instrumental

== Syntax ==
Comanche parts of speech include nouns, verbs, adjectives, adverbs, pronouns, and interjections (such as haa 'yes' and kee 'no'), as well as particles.

The standard word order is subject–object–verb, but it can shift in two specific circumstances. The topic of a sentence, though marked with one of two particles, is often placed at the beginning of the sentence, defying the standard word order. Furthermore, the subject of a sentence is often placed second in a sentence. When the subject is also the topic, as is often the case, it ends up in the first position, preserving SOV word order; otherwise, the subject will be placed second. For example, the English sentence 'I hit the man' could be rendered in Comanche with the components in either of the following two orders: 'I' (topic) 'man' (object) 'hit' (an aspect marker)—the standard SOV word order—or 'man' (object and topic) 'I' 'hit' (an aspect marker)—an OSV word order, which accentuates the role of the man who was hit.

=== Switch reference ===
Like other Numic languages, Comanche has switch-reference markers to handle subordination. This refers to markers which indicate whether or not a subordinate verb has the same or different subject as the main verb, and in the case of Comanche, also the temporal relation between the two verbs.

When the verb of a subordinate clause has a different subject from the verb of the main clause, and the time of the verbs is simultaneous, the subordinate verb is marked with -ku, and its subject is marked as if it were an object. When the time of the verbs is not simultaneous, the subordinate verb is marked with one of several affixes depending on the duration of the subordinate verb and whether it refers to an action which occurred before that described by the main verb or one which occurred after.

== In popular culture ==
In the 1956 film The Searchers, starring John Wayne, there are several badly pronounced Comanche words interspersed, such as nawyecka (nooyʉka 'move camp around') and timoway (tʉmʉʉ 'buy, trade').

In the 1963 film McLintock!, also starring John Wayne, McLintock (Wayne) and Chief Puma (Michael Pate) speak Comanche several times throughout the film.

In a 2013 Boston Globe article, linguist Todd McDaniels of Comanche Nation College commented on Johnny Depp's attempts to speak the Comanche language in the film The Lone Ranger, saying, "The words were there, the pronunciation was shaky but adequate."

In the 2016 film The Magnificent Seven, two of the titular characters, a Comanche warrior named Red Harvest and Sam Chisholm, an African-American warrant officer, speak Comanche to each other.

In the 2019 TV series The Son, the main character, Eli McCullough, lives with a tribe of Comanche natives, who speak in Comanche to each other and later to him.

The 2022 movie Prey, set in the early 18th century, is the first feature film to have a full Comanche language dub.

== See also ==
- Comanche people
- Numic languages
- Shoshoni language
- Timbisha language

== Bibliography ==
- Anderton, Alice. (1997). Kaawosa plays a trick on a soldier: A Comanche coyote story. In Jane Hill, P.J. Mistry, & Lyle Campbell (Eds.), The life of language: Papers in linguistics in honor of William Bright (pp. 243–255). Trends in linguistics: Studies and monographs (No. 108). Berlin: Mouton de Gruyter.
- Armagost, James (1982). "Comanche deictic roots in narrative texts". Kansas Working Papers in Linguistics. 7: 5–14.
- Armagost, James (1982). "The temporal relationship between telling and happening in Comanche narrative". Anthropological Linguistics. 24: 193–200.
- Armagost, James (1983). "Comanche narrative: Some general remarks and a selected text". Kansas Working Papers in Linguistics. 8 (2): 1–30.
- Armagost, James (1985). "On predicting voiceless vowels in Comanche". Kansas Working Papers in Linguistics. 10 (2): 1–15.
- Armagost, James (1985). "Comanche ma-: Undistinguished deictic, narrative obviative". International Journal of American Linguistics. 51 (3): 302–310. doi:10.1086/465874. JSTOR 1265433. S2CID 144736982.
- Armagost, James (1986). "Three exceptions to vowel devoicing in Comanche". Anthropological Linguistics. 28: 3.
- Armagost, James (1990). "Interpreting St. Clair's Comanche texts: Objective case marking and the 'same subject' dependent clauses". Kansas Working Papers in Linguistics. 15 (2): 1–17.
- Canonge, Elliott D. (1957). "Voiceless vowels in Comanche". International Journal of American Linguistics. 23 (2): 63–67. doi:10.1086/464394. JSTOR 1264055. S2CID 144747035.
- Canonge, Elliott D. (1958). Comanche texts. Summer Institute of Linguistics publications in linguistics and related fields (No. 1). Norman, Oklahoma: Summer Institute of Linguistics of the University of Oklahoma.
- Casagrande, Joseph B. (1948). "Comanche baby language". International Journal of American Linguistics. 14 (1): 11–14. doi:10.1086/463971. JSTOR 1263088. S2CID 143553242.
- Casagrande, Joseph B. (1954). "Comanche linguistic acculturation: I". International Journal of American Linguistics. 20 (2): 140–151. doi:10.1086/464267. JSTOR 1263388. S2CID 224809321.
- Casagrande, Joseph B. (1954). "Comanche linguistic acculturation: II". International Journal of American Linguistics. 20 (3): 217–237. doi:10.1086/464281. JSTOR 1263347. S2CID 224806964.
- Casagrande, Joseph B. (1955). "Comanche linguistic acculturation: III". International Journal of American Linguistics. 21 (1): 8–25. doi:10.1086/464304. JSTOR 1263210. S2CID 143518736.
- Charney, Jean Ormsbee (1993). A Grammar of Comanche. London/Lincoln: University of Nebraska Press.
- Hamp, Eric (1958). "Prosodic notes: On Comanche voiceless vowels". International Journal of American Linguistics. 24 (4): 321–322. doi:10.1086/464481. JSTOR 1263980. S2CID 224807598.
- Osborn, Henry; Smalley, William (1949). "Formulae for Comanche stem and word formation". International Journal of American Linguistics. 15 (2): 93–99. doi:10.1086/464027. S2CID 144145575.
- Rejón, Manuel García (1995) [1864]. Gelo, Daniel J. (ed.). Comanche vocabulary. Texas archaeology and ethnohistory series (trilingual ed.). Austin: University of Texas Press.
- Robinson, Lila Wistrand; Armagost, James (1990). Comanche dictionary and grammar. Publications in linguistics (No. 92). Dallas, Texas: The Summer Institute of Linguistics and The University of Texas at Arlington.
- Smalley, William (1953). "Phonemic rhythm in Comanche". International Journal of American Linguistics. 19 (4): 297–301. doi:10.1086/464236. S2CID 143160101.
- Troike, Rudolph C. (1956). "Comanche linguistic acculturation: A critique". International Journal of American Linguistics. 22 (3): 213–215. doi:10.1086/464370. S2CID 145069725.
