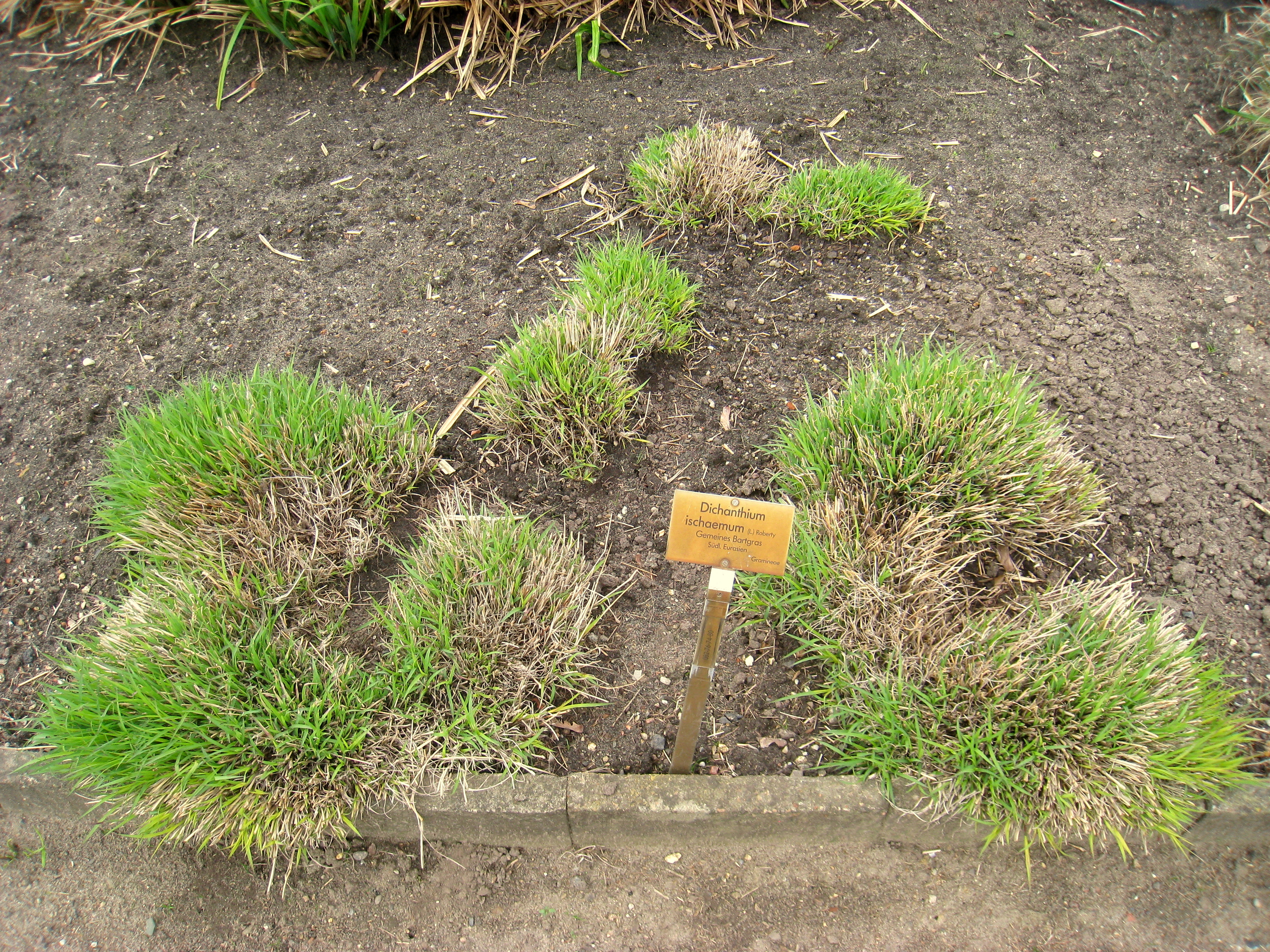

Scientific classification
- Kingdom: Plantae
- Clade: Embryophytes
- Clade: Tracheophytes
- Clade: Spermatophytes
- Clade: Angiosperms
- Clade: Monocots
- Clade: Commelinids
- Order: Poales
- Family: Poaceae
- Subfamily: Panicoideae
- Genus: Bothriochloa
- Species: B. ischaemum

Binomial name
- Bothriochloa ischaemum (L.) Keng

Varieties
- B. i. var. ischaemum; B. i. var. songarica (Rupr. ex Fisch. & C.A.Mey.) Celarier & J.R.Harlan

Synonyms
- List: Amphilophis ischaemum (L.) Nash; Andropogon angustifolius Sm. nom. illeg.; Andropogon annulatus J.A.Schmidt nom. inval.; Andropogon articulatus Dulac nom. illeg.; Andropogon digitatus St.-Lag. nom. illeg.; Andropogon ischaemum L.; Andropogon panormitanus Parl.; Andropogon patulus Moench; Andropogon pertusus var. panormitanus (Parl.) Hack.; Andropogon taiwanensis Ohwi; Andropogon undulatus Pers.; Andropogon villosus Lam. nom. illeg.; Bothriochloa ischaemum (L.) Mansf.; Bothriochloa ischaemum (L.) Henrard; Bothriochloa panormitana (Parl.) Pilg.; Bothriochloa taiwanensis Ohwi nom. inval.; Dichanthium ischaemum (L.) Roberty; Digitaria collina Salisb. nom. inval.; Ischaemum dactyloideum Montandon; Sorghum ischaemum (L.) Kuntze; Sorghum villosum (Lam.) Kuntze nom. illeg.

= Bothriochloa ischaemum =

Species of grasses

Bothriochloa ischaemum is a species of perennial grass in the family Poaceae, found throughout much of the world. It is commonly known as yellow bluestem. Two varieties are recognized, of which Bothriochloa ischaemum var. ischaemum is native to Europe, Asia, and Africa and naturalized elsewhere, and var. songarica is native to Asia and naturalized elsewhere. Var. songarica is an invasive weed in Texas, where it is known as "King Ranch bluestem"; it has displaced native grasses in large areas of central and south Texas.

The species name come from the Ancient Greek ischaemum, a styptic (causing ischemia).
