= Sue Huang (scientist) =

New Zealand-based virologist

Sue Huang FRSNZ
- Other name: Qiu Sue Huang
- Awards: Shorland Medal, Fellow of the Royal Society Te Apārangi, Hercus Medal

Academic background
- Education: University of Pennsylvania

Academic work
- Institutions: Institute of Environmental Science and Research

Qiu Sue Huang FRSNZ is a New Zealand virologist, and works at the New Zealand Institute for Public Health and Forensic Science (formerly known as ESR). She is an expert on influenza and polio viruses, and leads the Southern Hemisphere Influenza and Vaccine Effectiveness Research and Surveillance (SHIVERS) programme. In 2025 Huang was elected a Fellow of the Royal Society Te Apārangi. She was awarded the 2026 Hercus Medal.

== Academic career ==
Huang completed a PhD titled Development of herpes simplex virus type-1 as an efficient vector for foreign gene expression in the nervous system at the University of Pennsylvania in 1995. Huang is an expert on influenza and polio viruses. She is the director of the World Health Organisation National Influenza Centre at the Institute of Environmental Science and Research, and leads the Southern Hemisphere Influenza and Vaccine Effectiveness Research and Surveillance (SHIVERS) programme. The SHIVERS programme was awarded the Royal Society Te Apārangi's Shorland Medal in 2020.

In March 2025 Huang was elected a Fellow of the Royal Society Te Apārangi, for "her innovative and cutting-edge surveillance and research programmes on influenza virus, immunity, and vaccines".

In 2026, Huang was awarded the Royal Society Te Apārangi's Hercus Medal, for "excellence in molecular and cellular biology, biomedical sciences and technologies, clinical sciences or public health". The citation recognised her work in drawing attention to the greater burden of respiratory disease carried by Māori and Pasifika communities, noting that Huang's findings had informed both national policy and World Health Organisation standards.

== Selected works ==
- Iuliano, Danielle; Roguski, Katherine; Chang, Howard; et al. (2017). "Estimates of global seasonal influenza-associated respiratory mortality: a modelling study". The Lancet. doi:10.1016/s0140-6736(17)33293-2. PMC 5935243. PMID 29248255. Wikidata Q46876629.
- Dawood, Fatimah; Iuliano, Danielle; Reed, Carrie; et al. (2012). "Estimated global mortality associated with the first 12 months of 2009 pandemic influenza A H1N1 virus circulation: a modelling study". Lancet Infectious Diseases. 12 (9): 687–95. doi:10.1016/s1473-3099(12)70121-4. PMID 22738893. Wikidata Q28269717.
- Li, You; Wang, Xin; Blau, Dianna; et al. (2022). "Global, regional, and national disease burden estimates of acute lower respiratory infections due to respiratory syncytial virus in children younger than 5 years in 2019: a systematic analysis". The Lancet. 399 (10340): 2047–2064. doi:10.1016/s0140-6736(22)00478-0. PMC 7613574. PMID 35598608. Wikidata Q116170707.
- Huang, Sue; Wood, Tim; Jelley, Lauren; et al. (2020). "Impact of the COVID-19 nonpharmaceutical interventions on influenza and other respiratory viral infections in New Zealand". bioRxiv. doi:10.1101/2020.11.11.20228692. PMC 7668762. PMID 33200149. Wikidata Q102129769.
- Baker, Michael George; Wilson, Nick; Huang, Sue; et al. (2009). "Pandemic influenza A(H1N1)v in New Zealand: the experience from April to August 2009". Eurosurveillance. 14 (34): 127–136. doi:10.2807/ese.14.34.19319-en. PMID 19712648. Wikidata Q30380176.
- Hall, Richard J.; Wang, Jing; Todd, Angela K; et al. (2013). "Evaluation of rapid and simple techniques for the enrichment of viruses prior to metagenomic virus discovery". Journal of Virological Methods. 195: 194–204. doi:10.1016/j.jviromet.2013.08.035. PMID 24036074. Wikidata Q38137615.
