= John D. Groendyke =

American trucking executive (1944–2026)

John D. Groendyke (August 17, 1944 – June 13, 2026) was an American trucking executive. He was the chairman of Groendyke Transport, the 10th largest (2025) bulk tank truck company serving the US and Canada, headquartered in Enid, Oklahoma.

== Early life ==
Groendyke graduated from Wentworth Military Academy in 1964, where he achieved the highest rank of cadet, Brigade Commander. Following graduation, he attended Oklahoma State University earning a bachelor's degree in business in 1966. Groendyke further continued his education by obtaining a Juris Doctor degree from the University of Oklahoma in 1969.

After a two-year stint in the US Army, where he served as a captain, he returned to Enid, Oklahoma.

== Career ==
After returning to Enid, Groendyke went to work at Groendyke Transport, the family trucking operation, founded in 1932, by his father, H.C. Groendyke.

In 1974, Oklahoma Governor David L. Boren appointed Groendyke to serve on the Oklahoma Wildlife Conservation Commission, an eight-member board controlling the Oklahoma Department of Wildlife Conservation, with a term of eight years. Six different governors continued to appoint him to the commission, resulting in Governor Mary Falin issuing a Citation in December 2016, recognizing Groendyke's 40 years of service with the group, and declaring December 13, 2016 'Commissioner John Groendyke Day'.

From 2003, Groendyke was a Director of Energy on the board of OGE Energy Corp. and its operating company, Oklahoma Gas & Electric.

In 2004, he was named to the board of directors of the Oklahoma State Fair.

Oklahoma State University Alumni Association inducted Groendyke into the OSU Hall of Fame on February 13, 2015. The award recognizes "alumni and former students with outstanding lifetime achievements in society and professional life." Prior to Groendyke's 2015 class induction, only 165 members of the 207,000 alumni had been honored with the award.

== Death ==
Groendyke died on June 13, 2026, at the age of 81.
