= Elsayed Elsayed Wagih =

Egyptian professor

- Born: November 21, 1946 (age 79); Alexandria, Egypt
- Title: Member of the High Committee for Promoting University Faculty at the Supreme Council of Egyptian Universities
- Scientific career
- Fields: Virology and biotechnology
- Workplaces: Alexandria University
- Doctoral advisor: Dr. R.H.A. Coutts

Elsayed Elsayed Wagih PhD, DIC, CIDTT (born 21 November 1946) is an Egyptian professor of virology and biotechnology and vice President of the Arab Society for Biotechnology. He was born in Alexandria, Egypt. Wagih is well known for having invented Zymoblot, the fastest available microtechnique to detect gene expression and/or enzyme activity in any biological specimen as well as the ”Mirror Image in vivo electro-blotting technique” that detects virus particles or any foreign protein (Gene Expression) in any tissue. He also discovered two viruses reported under his name in the world data bank of viruses, the first was named "Peanut Chlorotic Ringspot Virus (PCRV)" and the second was called “Peanut Top Paralysis (PTPV)".

Also, a champion in Greek-Roman and free-style wrestling in Egypt for the period from 1965 to 1977. He was the one who made the College of Agriculture enjoy, for the first time at the level of University of Alexandria, the winning, in 1965–1966, of first place in the 74 kg class Greco-Roman Wrestling.

== Education ==
In 1970, he received a B.Sc. in Plant Pathology from University of Alexandria and in 1975, he gained an M.Sc. degree in Plant Bacterial Diseases from the same university. In 1981 he received a PhD degree in Virology from the Imperial College of Science, University of London and was awarded in the same year a DIC from the Royal College of Science, University of London.

== Positions held ==
Since June 26, 1992, Wagih has been working as Professor of Plant Pathology and Biotechnology in the Department of Plant Pathology, College of Agriculture, University of Alexandria, Egypt. He is the former Head (2005–2007) of the Department of Plant Pathology and former vice director of research of the Biotechnology Centre, College of Agriculture, University of Alexandria, Egypt . He is also the former Representative of North Africa and a Board Member of the Governing Council of the African Crop Science Society (ACSS) for three successive election periods. He is the vice president of the Arab Society for Biotechnology. He is a member of the High Committee for Promoting University Faculty at the Supreme Council of Egyptian Universities.[citation needed]

== Prizes and awards ==
Wagih has gained several prizes and awards including a prize, in 1970, for the top student in Plant Pathology, awarded by the American Rotary Club of Alexandria, Egypt, a prize, in 1970, for scientific achievement awarded in commemoration of the late Prof. Abass El-Helali, recognised as the father of Plant Pathology in Egypt and Africa as a whole, a prize, in the same year, for the “ideal student” awarded by College of Agriculture, University of Alexandria, a research award (October 1978-June 1980) by the British Council, a research award (1983) by the British Council, and the highest award for Scientific research awarded by the 'Egyptian Academy of Science & Technology' for the year 1998. In August 2009, the University of Alexandria has awarded him a certificate of appreciation and a gold medal in recognition of his scientific excellence and outstanding academic performance.[citation needed]

== Membership and recognition certificates ==
In 1981, Wagih was granted the Diploma of Membership to the Royal College of Science (DIC), University of London and in October 1994, the Board of Governors of the New York Academy of Sciences, in recognition of his work in, and support for, science and technology, elected him as an active member of the academy. In January 1995, the Board of Governors of the American Association for the Advancement of Science (AAAS), elected him to become an International Member of the Association. Later, the Governing Council of the African Crop Science Society (ACSS), in recognition of his outstanding contribution to the society and the Promotion of Crop Production in Africa, granted him its 'Certificate of Recognition' for three successive times, the first of which was in Pretoria, South Africa, in 1997, and once again in Cazablanca, Morocco, in 1999, and lastly, and for the third time, in Lagos, Nigeria, 2001.

== Published books ==
Wagih was the author of a series of the first and most popular and comprehensive books on Biotechnology in Egypt and the rest of the Arabic–speaking countries. Out of the many books he published which were all centred on Biotechnology, the following are the most relevant ones: “Mad-Cow Disease and Human Cloning” (157.pp.), “Cancer in The Service of Biotechnology” (320pp.), “Biotechnology and Its Applications in Agriculture” (400pp.), "Genetic Engineering", Part I and Part II (2300pp., in press) and "Encyclopedia of Genetic Engineering" (1500pp.).

== Discoveries ==
Wagih have discovered two viruses reported under his name in the world data bank of viruses, the first was named "Peanut Chlorotic Ringspot Virus (PCRV)" and published in J. Phytopathology (1994). 1405: 144-133 and the second was called “Peanut Top Paralysis (PTPV)" and published in J. Phytopathology (1994). 141: 302–313.

== Inventions ==
Wagih has invented two new techniques:The first was named Zymoblot and reported to be the fastest available microtechnique to detect gene expression and/or enzyme activity in any biological specimen and was published in Canadian Journal of Microbiology (1993). 39: 543–547. The second which was given the name “Mirror Image in vivo electroblotting technique” is designed to detect virus particles or any foreign protein (Gene Expression) in any tissues and was published in the Journal of Virological Methods (1994). 48: 145–153.

== Teaching responsibilities ==
Teaching has been Wagih's career since 1970, when he was permanently appointed as an instructor in the Department of Plant Pathology, College of Agriculture, University of Alexandria. He was responsible for teaching and supervising laboratory classes in Plant Pathology including: General Botany (Morphology, and Anatomy), Advanced Plant Anatomy, Plant Taxonomy, Plant Physiology, Bacterial Plant Diseases, Mycology, Fungal Diseases of Plants and General Plant Pathology.

Following obtaining his M.Sc. degree in Bacteriology in 1975, he was appointed as an Assistant Lecturer in the same department with the same previously mentioned responsibilities until he left the department for Great Britain to study for the Ph.D. degree. In 1979, he worked as an Assistant Lecturer in the Department of what is now known as Department of Pure and Applied Biology, Imperial College of Science Technology and Medicine, University of London. He was responsible for teaching and supervising the practical part of an undergraduate course on 'Biology of Virus Diseases' taught by R.H.A. Coutts.

Upon his return from the United Kingdom, he was appointed in 1982 a Lecturer (Assistant Professor) in the Department of Plant Pathology, College of Agriculture, University of Alexandria and asked by the Head of the department to take the responsibility for teaching courses dealing with the molecular aspect of Plant Pathology. He ran and organised, in collaboration with others, three courses, a third year course on 'Phytomedicine' (Plant Pathology), a fourth year course on 'viral diseases' whose practical component was also run and organised by him and a post-graduate course on 'Origin of Variation and Development of Strains In Plant Pathogens', in which he included a great deal of genetic engineering as an unusual (man-made) source of variation. He was also involved in teaching bacteriology and plant physiology.

From 1988 to 1993, he was privately contracted as a professor teaching general biology and biochemistry for medical students in Saudi Arabia.

From March 1987, when he was promoted to Associate Professorship, to May 1992, when he became a full professor and onwards, he became in charge of developing and teaching courses taught in the department and dealing with Biotechnology and its application in the field of Plant Pathology with particular emphasis on Genetic Engineering. During this period he was also appointed as a vice director of research of the Biotechnology Centre at the college.

In 2004, and based on his extensive experience in the field of Modern Biotechnology, the College Council elected him to be the Professor in charge of designing (planning and preparing) and teaching a course on 'Biotechnology And Its Applications To Agriculture' with its two components, the theoretical and the practical components for the 3rd year undergraduate students of the whole college. The Council approved his book on 'Biotechnology and its applications to Agriculture' as the accredited reference for the course. The task involved setting the syllabus for both the theoretical and practical elements of the course. He was also given the same responsibilities for a corresponding course taught in English in the parallel English Programme study adopted by the college.

He was invited by the department of Plant Pathology to design and set out the syllabus for an advanced course on "Biotechnology and Plant Pathology" with its two elements, theory and practical, to be taught as a mandatory course within the credit hour system newly adopted by the college as stated by the new college's by-law to post-graduate students registering for M.Sc. and Ph.D. degrees. He has been in charge of teaching the theoretical and the practical parts of the course and supervising its laboratory work starting from the Academic year 2008/2009.

== Research collaboration ==
Beside his main research stream, he worked collaboratively as a visiting scientist with many famous scientists from different parts of the world:

He was involved in research at London University led by both Dr. R.H.A. Coutts and Prof. R.K.S. Wood (FRS), Virology laboratory, Imperial College of Science. The work was centred on elucidating the molecular basis of gene expression in terms of protein synthesis and enzyme activities in plant tissues exposed to biotic (necrosis-eliciting viruses or fungal infections) or abiotic stresses.

He worked as a visiting scientist in 1981, with Dr. R.H.A. Coutts on the replication and gene expression of single stranded DNA viruses (Geminiviruses) in protoplasts.

In 1983, he had another chance, sponsored by the British Council, to work, with Dr. R.H.A. Coutts, as an academic visitor in the Department of Pure and Applied Biology, Imperial College of Science, Technology and Medicine, London, looking for the possible subgenomic messages of Tobacco necrosis virus ssRNA genome in vivo using the cDNA technology.

In 1986, he spent almost a year as a visiting professor in the Department of Plant Pathology and the Hybridoma Centre, Noble Research Centre, Oklahoma State University, U.S.A., working, in collaboration with both Professor H.A. Melouk and Dr. J. L. Sherwood, on the pathology and molecular aspects of some peanut viruses. During this relatively short period of time which was, indeed, very productive, he discovered two viruses, Peanut Chlorotic Ringspot (PCRV) and Peanut Top Paralysis (PTPV) Virus. In addition, he developed a new technique, "Mirror Image in vivo Electroblotting Technique (Mi-Tech.) to visualise virus particles (or any foreign protein) electrophoretically transferred from infected tissue onto nitrocellulose membrane and detected by an enzyme-linked immunobinding technique. This technique was the basis of what has been termed later by others as "Tissue blotting".

In the summer of 1990, he had another chance to work as a visiting scientist with Dr. Jaquline Fletcher, Professor of Mycoplasmology, of the Department of Plant Pathology, Noble Research Centre, Oklahoma State University, U.S.A. During this visit he invented another new technique, termed 'zymoblot' (published in Canadian Journal of Microbiology 39: 543–547) to detect enzyme activity in spiroplasmas and Bacteria. In addition, he used the electrophoretic zymogram analysis to study both the qualitative (Gene expression) and the quantitative alterations in some selected enzymes in spiroplasma- infected tissues in an attempt to elucidate the biochemical changes and gene expression associated with spiroplasma infections in plants.

From 2000 to 2003, he led a research team working collaboratively with a number of active scientists from the Agricultural Genetic Engineering Research Institute (AGERI) who were also working under his guidance and close supervision as a senior and co-principal investigator in a large research project whose fund exceeded 1.5 million Egyptian Pounds. The project was on 'The Use of Genetic Engineering Techniques To Develop Transgenic Banana Resistant To Virus Infections'. In this work, two strategies were adopted, the Coat protein-mediated resistance and the antisense technology to suppress the Replicase gene. Because of the intellectual property right issues, restrictions on publishing the work have been imposed by the sponsor.

In 2001, he went on a sabbatical leave to collaboratively work with Dr. Philip Dale and N. S. Al-Kaff of John Innes Centre, Nowrich, UK. The work was centred on studying the mechanism of gene silencing in virus-infected and transgenic plants and the possible involvement of DNA-methylation including the restriction sites of some selected restriction enzymes of relevance to this phenomenon.

== Academic administration ==
As Head of the department, he took the responsibility for administering the department and with this he made himself available to assist the Administration of the college and that of the university for a smooth running of academic activities, and administrative duties in his department. He also served, in various capacities, on numerous Departmental, college, university and National and International Committees.

== Membership of departmental, college, university and national committees ==
Wagih has served as a member on many committees, including the Editorial Advisory Committee on Virology and Biotechnology, Alexandria Journal of Agricultural Research, Education and Student Affairs Committee, Curricula-Developing Committee, the committee which has been established in response to the National Quality Assurance and Accreditation (QAA) requirements, and the Post-graduate & Research Affairs Committee, College of Agriculture, University of Alexandria. He has also been a member of the University of Alexandria Biotechnology Experts Committee, invited by the University of Alexandria to establish a Biotechnology Centre and coordinate research activities in biotechnology among the different disciplines throughout the university. He is the president of the International Biotechnology Affairs Committee, Arab Society for Biotechnology and the chief advisor on biotechnology affairs for the College of Agriculture Administration.

In addition, he has been selected by the Academy of Scientific Research & Technology as a member of the National Committee on Reviewing and Assessing Genetic Engineering and Biotechnology project proposals submitted to the academy by the Egyptian Centres of Excellence of Genetic Engineering and Biotechnology.

== Projects ==
Wagih was either the principal or the co-principal investigator for many national and internationally linked scientific research projects on several aspects of biotechnology and genetic engineering. Of these, "Production of Virus-free Potato Plants Using The Tissue Culture Technique", " Production of Genetically Engineered (Transgenic) Sugarcane Resistant to Virus Infections" and " Production of Genetically Engineered (Transgenic) banana resistant to Cucumber Mosaic Virus (CMV) and Banana Bunchy Top Virus (BPTV)" are the most recent three projects, whose funding ranged from 1 to 1.5 million Egyptian pounds per project.

== Other academic activities ==
Wagih, independently or jointly, supervised many M.Sc. and Ph.D. theses in the field of Biotechnology and Virology, both locally and internationally. He was a reviewer and assessor of many research papers and scientific projects on Biotechnology, both locally and internationally. He is on the list of Biotechnology evaluators for the Institute of Biotechnology and Genetic Engineering of Moubarak City for Scientific Research and Technological Applications, Alexandria, Egypt and has also been selected as an evaluator of the work submitted for promotion to higher ranks by many Faculty members from several international universities and scientific institutes. As indicated before, he serves as an active member in the National Committee set up by the Academy of Scientific research & Technology for reviewing and evaluating Genetic Engineering and Biotechnology projects submitted, for funding, to the academy.

== Scientific conferences ==
Wagih participated and chaired sessions in over 25 international scientific conferences held in many countries throughout the world including: Britain (Cardiff, Glasgow, Leeds, London, Manchester, Norwich) France (Strasbourg), Kuwait (Kuwait), Kenya (Nairobi), Morocco (Casablanca), Nigeria (Lagos), Papua New Guinea (Lae), South Africa (Pretoria), The Netherlands (The Hague), Uganda (Kampala), United States of America (Florida).

== Publications ==
Wagih has published over 100 publications in the field of Biological sciences including: Plant pathology and biotechnology.

== Hobbies and athletic activities ==
Wagih is a scientific draftsman and a cartoonist. Additionally, he is a champion in Greek-Roman and free-style wrestling in Egypt from 1965 to 1977. He was the one who made the College of Agriculture enjoy, for the first time at the level of University of Alexandria, the winning, in 1965–1966, of the 1st place in the 74 kg class Greco-Roman Wrestling. He represented the University of Alexandria in both national and international championships during the previously mentioned period of time.

He was in charge of coaching the Greek-Roman Wrestling team of the College of Agriculture in Alexandria for the period from 1965 to 1977, during which the team remained holding the top position at the national level. He was elected to be the Secretary of the Wrestling division at the 'Egyptian Olympic Club in Alexandria from 1971 to 1973.
