= Horace Casey =

American electrical engineer (1934–2026)

- Born: Horace Craig Casey Jr. December 4, 1934; Texas, U.S.
- Died: June 9, 2026 (aged 91); Durham, North Carolina, U.S.
- Education: Oklahoma State University; Stanford University
- Occupation: Electrical engineer
- Spouse: Jacqueline Baumgardner

Horace Craig Casey Jr. (December 4, 1934 – June 9, 2026) was an American electrical engineer.

== Early life and career ==
Casey was born in Texas on December 4, 1934. He attended Oklahoma State University, earning his BS degree in electrical engineering in 1957. He also attended Stanford University, earning his MS degree in 1959 and his PhD degree in 1964. While attending Stanford, he worked at Hewlett-Packard in Palo Alto, California from 1957 to 1962. He also worked as a technical staff member at Lucent Technologies from 1964 to 1979.

He served as a professor in the department of electrical engineering at Duke University from 1979 to 2002. During his years as a professor, from 1984 to 1991, he served on the board of directors of Acme Electronics, and in 1984, he was named a fellow of the Institute of Electrical and Electronics Engineers, "for contributions to III-V compounds in understanding emission based on the basic optical and impurity behavior".

== Personal life and death ==
Casey was married to Jacqueline Baumgardner. Their marriage lasted until Casey's death in 2026.

Casey died in Durham, North Carolina on June 9, 2026, at the age of 91.
