= George Judge =

American econometrician

George G. Judge
- Born: May 2, 1925 (age 101); Nicholas, Kentucky, U.S.

Academic work
- Discipline: Econometrics
- Institutions: University of California, Berkeley
- Website: are.berkeley.edu/users/george-g-judge

George Garrett Judge (born May 2, 1925) is an American econometrician and Professor in the Graduate School in the Department of Agricultural and Resource Economics in the UC Berkeley College of Natural Resources.

== Biography ==
Judge was born on a farm in Nicholas, Kentucky on Mary 2, 1925. During World War II, he served on Saipan Island, flying B-29 missions over Japan. After the war he attended the University of Kentucky, earning his bachelor's degree in Agricultural Economics in 1948. Judge went on to earn his PhD in economics and statistics from Iowa State University, and became an assistant professor at the University of Connecticut in 1951; a full professor at Oklahoma State University in 1955; and (after a visit at Yale) moved to the University of Illinois, where he remained until 1986, when he moved to the Department of Agricultural and Resource Economics at the University of California, Berkeley, where he remains active to this day.

== Contributions ==
Judge has published over 150 articles in research journals. His work has spanned many research questions in econometrics, including the estimation of parameters for a Markov probability model from time series data; inference from spatial and temporal price and allocation models; and application of information theory to recover systematic behavior from noisy data. Judge has written a number of foundational textbooks in econometrics that have been widely used by graduate students in econometrics since the 1970s.

== Notable publications ==
1. An Information Theoretic Approach to Econometrics, 2011 (with Ron C. Mittelhammer)
2. Econometric Foundations, 2000 (with Ron C. Mittelhammer and Douglas J. Miller)

== Fellowships and honors ==
- Fellow of the Econometric Society
- Fellow of the Journal of Econometrics
- Fellow of the American Agricultural Economics Association
