= Helen Freudenberger Holmes =

American journalist, historian, and Women's Army Corps officer

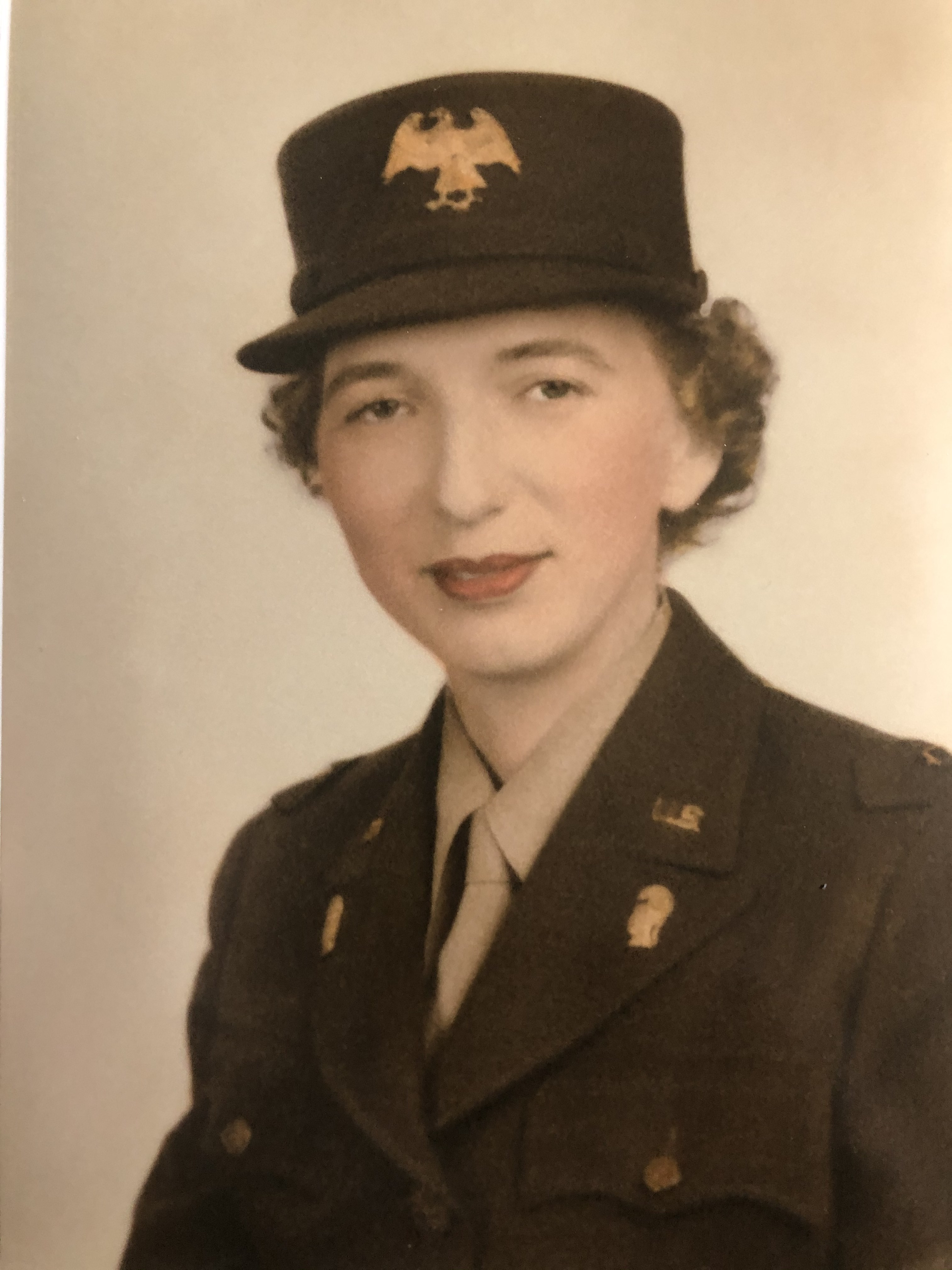
Helen Freudenberger Holmes in 1942

Helen Freudenberger Holmes (December 16, 1915 – March 22, 1997) was an American journalist, historian, teacher, politician, and Women's Army Corps officer.

== Early life and education ==
Helen Loretta Freudenberger was born December 16, 1915, in Pleasant Valley, Oklahoma, to German immigrants John Andrew and Theresia Karner Freudenberger, the youngest of eight. She graduated from Coyle High School in Coyle, Oklahoma. She graduated from Oklahoma A&M in 1936 with a bachelor's degree in English and wrote for the college newspaper, The Daily Collegian. According the Oklahoma State, she wrote more column inches than anyone in the history of the newspaper. In 1940 she became the first woman to earn a master's degree in Agriculture Journalism from the University of Wisconsin.

== Career ==
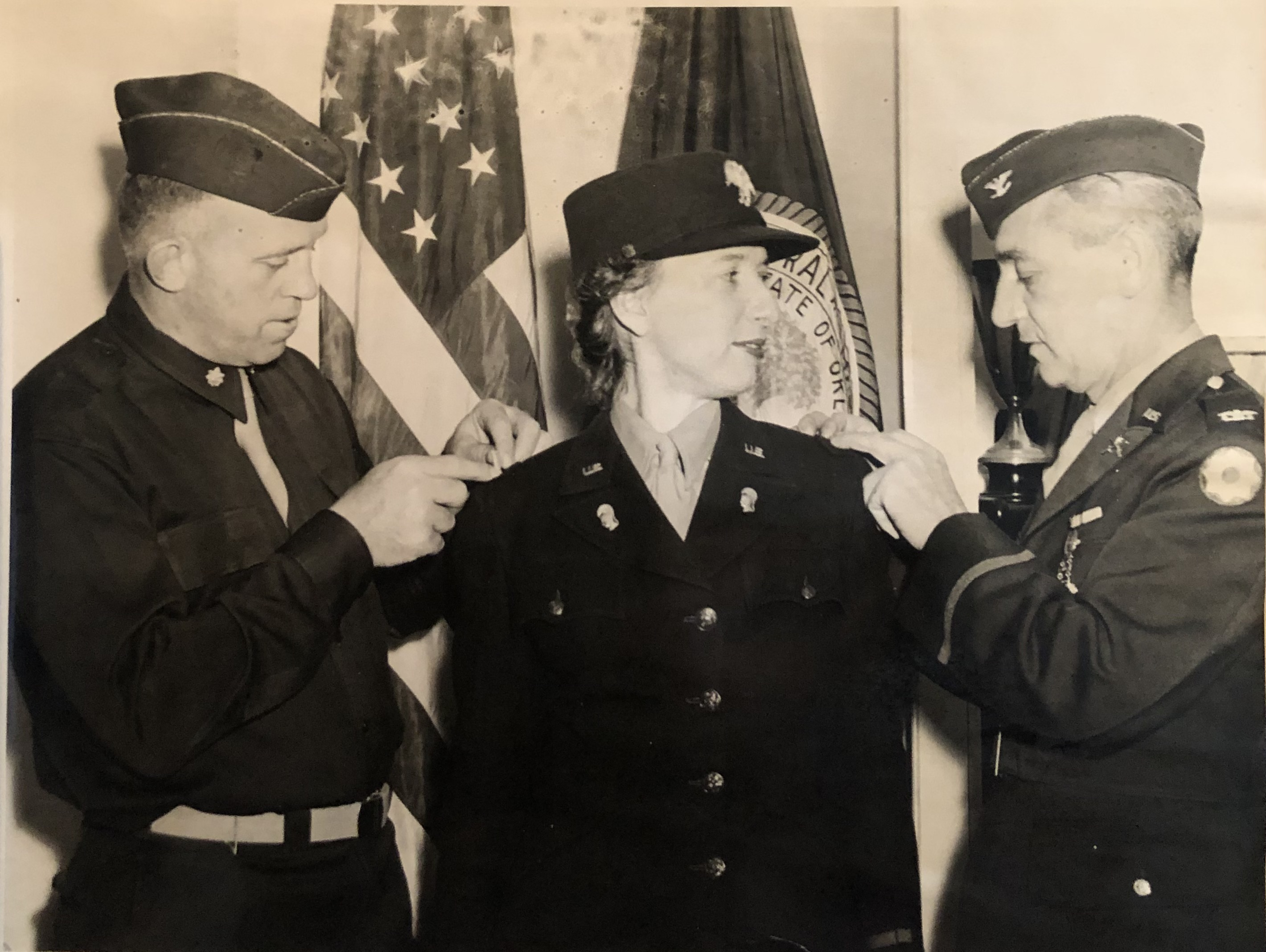
Holmes being promoted in 1942

Holmes was a newspaper journalist and journalism teacher. After graduating from Oklahoma A&M she became editor of the Maud Daily Enterprise. She was the first woman to teach journalism at Oklahoma A&M, which became Oklahoma State University.

Holmes was the first woman in Oklahoma to be sworn into the Women's Army Auxiliary Corps due to the death of her mother, which resulted in her being sworn in before the rest of the first class of recruits. She served in Washington, DC, as the WAC's public relations officer. She was promoted to captain as an intelligence officer. After a diagnosis of tuberculosis, she returned stateside and was among the first group of patients to be treated with penicillin. She was promoted to major and in 1948 retired from active duty.

She served on Guthrie, Oklahoma, city council and in 1979 she was elected mayor.

She wrote a two-volume history of Logan County, Oklahoma.

== Awards ==
In 2019 and 2020 Holmes was posthumously inducted into the US Army Women's Foundation, the Oklahoma Historians, the Oklahoma Journalism and the Oklahoma Women's halls of fame.

== Personal life ==
Holmes married Robert F. Holmes in 1949 and was widowed in 1962. The couple had three children, all of whom graduated from OSU. She died March 22, 1997, and was buried at Pleasant Valley Lutheran Cemetery near Coyle. She was a Democrat and attended Zion Lutheran Church in Guthrie.
