= Jerry Slack =

American golf course designer

Jerry Slack is an American golf course designer based in Tulsa, Oklahoma. He has played a role in more than 65 golf course construction projects. His winning of the Municipal Improvement of the Year award for Quail Ridge Golf Club in Kansas propelled him to designing some of the biggest projects in golf course design. His General's Ridge course in Manassas, Virginia was nominated for Golf Digest's “Best New Public Course” in 1997.
