= Zymoblot =

Microtechnique to detect gene expression or enzyme activity

Zymoblot is a microtechnique used to detect gene expression or enzyme activity in a biological specimen. The technique was invented by Professor Elsayed Elsayed Wagih in collaboration with Professor Jacqueline Fletcher of the Department of Plant Pathology, Noble Research Centre, Oklahoma State University, US in 1993.

== Background ==
Physiological phenomena whether at the cellular or molecular level in living organisms are driven either directly or indirectly by enzyme reactions. The assay of enzyme activities in living organisms is therefore one of the most commonly performed activities in modern physiology laboratories. Numerous methods of enzyme assays are available to quantitatively follow enzyme reactions. These methods which have been grouped in six categories, namely, spectrophotometric, fluorescence, nanometric, electrode, polarimetric, radiobiochemical are with no drawbacks. Recently, a new qualitative or rather semi quantitative micro-technique, first described by Wagih and Fletcher (1993), and termed 'zymoblot' has been introduced to detect enzyme activities in spiroplasmas and bacteria and many other biological systems. Later, the technique was made quantitative by densitometry and successfully used to monitor peroxidase activity in virus infected plants.

== Procedure ==
As little as 1 μL, or less, of a sample is enough to detect enzyme activity by the zymoblot technique as the coloured product being insoluble, accumulates at a confined area over the spotting site. The other techniques, based on colorimetry, may require larger aliquots of a sample so that the amount of the coloured soluble products produced is large enough to colour the content of the assay cuvette to a colorimetrically readable level.

The technique has advantages not shared by any other technique. Samples to be analysed by zymoblot require no dialysis (a process that may take days) as washing blots in Tris-buffered saline (TBS) before marinating them in the reaction mixture does remove inhibitors. In contrast to the other techniques where samples are assayed individually, samples to be analysed by zymoblot are spotted on the same blot and enzyme activity is assayed with the same reaction mixture at the same time minimising experimental errors and allowing quick qualitative comparisons. Additionally, several enzymes can be assayed in a sequential order on the same blot. That is to say, if a blot proves negative for a certain enzyme, it can be washed in TBS and reused for another enzyme and so on until a positive reaction for an enzyme is obtained. Unlike wet assays (e.g. colorimetry), results obtained by the zymoblot are always in a recorded from. This allows zymoblots to be carried out in one place, where a densitometer may not be available, and taken or sent to another place to be quantitatively assayed by densitometry. While immunologically-based enzyme assays which uses enzyme specific antibodies to directly detect enzymes suffers from the major disadvantage of measuring the "total enzyme content" and not the total enzyme activity, zymoblot, being not a serological technique, uses no antibodies and measures enzyme activity as it detects only the active (functional) portion of the total enzyme content in a sample.

Zymoblot is an end-point type of assay where an enzyme reaction is allowed to proceed for a fixed period of time before being stopped by rapid elimination of its specific substrate. However, the technique could be adapted for the continuous enzyme assay when colour intensity is monitored over time by incubating sister blots for progressively increasing periods of time. When different samples are compared on the same blot, the reaction should be stopped sometime during the linear part of the course of the reaction. This could be judged upon visually and the reaction is stopped when differences in colour intensity among spots are evident, taking into consideration that the duration of linearity in some enzyme reactions may be very short indeed.

== Applications ==
The Zymoblot technique is simpler, cheaper, more reliable and less time-consuming than all known procedures for enzyme assays. It is probably the quickest available technique to detect enzyme activity in any biological or even non-biological specimen. The technique is highly competitive in price with all commercially available kits. Such advantages should qualify the Zymoblot technique for wide potential uses in medicine, agriculture and industrial biotechnology and, more broadly, in general biotechnology application. It is useful in studies including physiology of humans, animals, plants and microorganisms, differential diagnosis of diseases and identification of pathogens, biotaxonomy of organisms, stress and pathogenesis physiology, physiological basis for disease resistance, developmental physiology and screening for commercially important enzymes and many other applications. The technique is particularly useful when initial testing for enzyme activity is required. It can be used in investigations involving screening a living organism for large numbers of enzymes. It can also be very handy in studying enzyme distribution or tissue-specific gene expression in terms of enzyme activity throughout the body or across an organ. Samples taken from different parts of an organism or an organ can simultaneously be analysed and compared, on the same blot, giving a clear picture of the distribution of enzyme activity. With the same simplicity, corresponding tissues taken from normally and biotically or abiotically stressed individuals can be compared for enzyme stimulation or induction. Furthermore, zymoblots can be very helpful in cytochemodissection studies aiming at localising enzymes within cells. Cell fractions representing different parts of the cell (nuclei, mitochondria, lysosomes, peroxisomes, Golgi bodies, cytosol,... etc.) can be tested for a host of enzymes in a relatively short time.

Qualitative zymoblot is of great potential use in diagnosis of human, animal and plant diseases. If a pathogen demonstrates a specific enzyme that is not shared by its host, the technique can be a definitive diagnostic tool. The detection of an enzyme not known to be normally present in a sample of body fluid (e.g. blood serum, CSF, synovial fluid, milk, tears...etc.) using qualitative zymoblot is an indication of a physiological disorder, inflammatory reaction or pathogenic infection. In all these situations, quantitative zymoblot can be used to determine the severity of the problem. Similarly, replacing biological fluids with non-biological fluids taken from water bodies (or prepared from similar environmental sources) at different locations or depths at different times will allow zymoblot, through detecting enzyme activities, to reveal or monitor microbial load and consequently determine the level of contamination in these sources.
