= Sanjiv Sidhu =

American businessman

- Born: June 1957 (age 69); Hyderabad, India
- Occupation: Chairman of o9 Solutions
- Known for: Founder of i2 Technologies, o9 Solutions

Sanjiv Sidhu (born June 1957) is an Indian-American software entrepreneur. He is known for founding i2 Technologies, a supply chain management software company, and o9 Solutions, a business management platform for multinational corporations.

== Early life and education ==
Sidhu was born in Hyderabad, India in 1957. His father was a chemist who oversaw India’s national laboratories. In his early years, Sidhu was a member of the national sailing team.

Sidhu graduated from Osmania University, earning a bachelor of science degree in chemical engineering. He then moved to the United States and attended Oklahoma State University, earning a master of science degree in chemical engineering in 1980. Sidhu also completed doctorate work in systems and control engineering at Case Western Reserve University in Cleveland.

== Career ==
Sidhu took a job at Texas Instruments’ artificial intelligence laboratory in Dallas, where he designed computer software that used advanced simulation techniques to assist TI planners’ management of their production processes.

=== i2 Technologies ===
He co-founded i2 Technologies, which specialized in supply chain management, with Ken Sharma in 1988 after Sidhu left his role at Texas Instruments. The company’s initial software product offerings were Factory Planner, which optimized material flow, and Rhythm, i2’s supply chain management software.

i2 Technologies went public in 1996, and Sidhu's personal stake in i2 hit a high of $6.5 billion; Forbes listed him as the 109th richest person in the world in 2001.

Sidhu left i2’s management in 2005 as well as the company’s board in 2009. In 2010, JDA Software Group acquired i2 for $604 million.

=== o9 Solutions ===
In 2009, he co-founded o9 Solutions, a business management platform designed to run on public cloud providers, with former i2 colleague Chakri Gottemukkala. The company’s mPower software features an AI-powered planning platform dubbed “The Digital Brain”, which uses “analytics and data to transform siloed planning into integrated and intelligent decision-making”.

The company reached unicorn status in 2020. In 2022, o9 Solutions raised $295 million in funding, valuing the company at $2.7 billion. In 2023, o9 added another billion to its valuation with a $116 million Series C financing round. The company has included on Inc.’s 5000 list of America’s fastest-growing private companies for seven consecutive years.
