= Comanche Nation College =

Tribal college in Oklahoma, U.S.

Coordinates: 34°35′22.51″N 98°24′3.06″W

- Motto: Kim~~u~~tsi n~~u~~m~~u~~m~~u~~?ai t~~u~~sua
- Motto in English: Come Study With Us
- Type: Native American tribal college and land grant institution
- Active: August 8, 2002–July 31, 2017
- Affiliations: American Indian Higher Education Consortium
- President: Consuelo Lopez, PhD
- Head: =1
- Undergraduates: over 500
- Location: Lawton, Oklahoma, United States
- Campus: Urban
- Colors: royal blue, golden yellow, and red
- Website: www.cnc.cc.ok.us

Comanche Nation College was a two-year, open admissions, American Indian tribal college. It was located in Lawton, Oklahoma, the capital of the Comanche Nation. The school was chartered in 2002 by the Comanche Nation Business Committee. Comanche Nation College operated until July 31, 2017.

== History ==
A Comanche Nation Charter Resolution established CNC as a community college in 2002. CNC was the first Tribal College established in the state of Oklahoma. The college closed in 2017 due to a lack of funding following a loss of accreditation.

=== Accreditation ===
The college became a candidate for accreditation by the Higher Learning Commission in 2012. It withdrew from the process in 2016. Unable to gain sufficient funding without accreditation, it closed in 2017.

== Governance ==
The Comanche Nation established a Comanche Nation College Council of leaders in higher education. The Comanche Nation is federally recognized as a tribe of Oklahoma. The Comanche Nation has 13,679 enrolled Tribal members, with about 6,000 members living in the Lawton-Fort Sill area of southwest Oklahoma.

== Partnerships ==
The college was a member of the American Indian Higher Education Consortium and American Association of Community Colleges. It was the 36th member of the organization and the first tribal college in Oklahoma. The college partnered with Cameron University in Lawton; students were dual-enrolled and transfers were facilitated for students who wanted to pursue four-year degrees.

The Oklahoma Board of Nursing approved the college's two-year nursing program, making it the first approved tribal nursing program in the state.

== Campus ==
The school occupied a former elementary school building.
