= Toby Wynn =

American women's college basketball coach (born 1975)

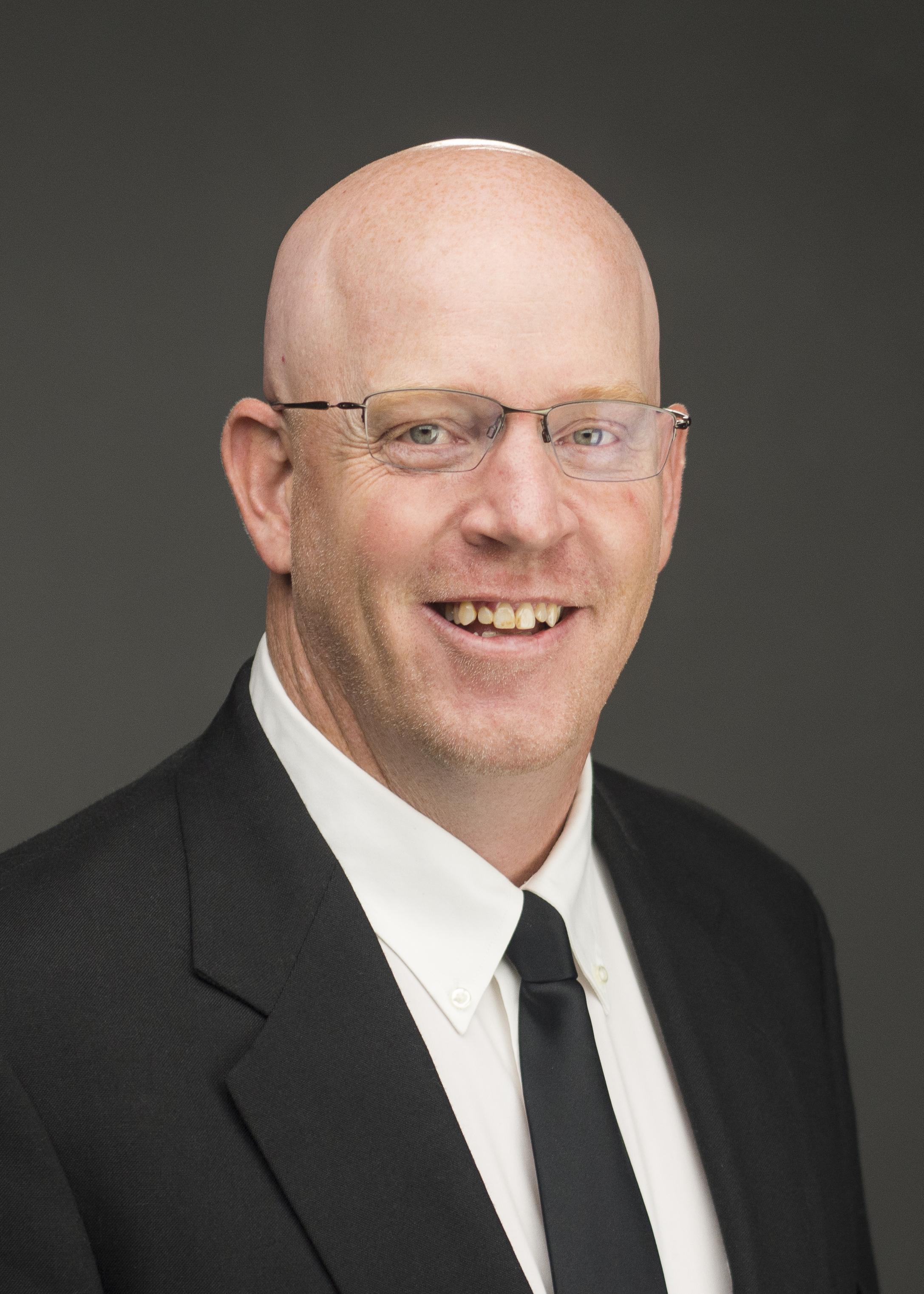

Biographical details
- Born: November 26, 1975 (age 50); Booker, Texas, U.S.
- Education: Oklahoma State University–Stillwater

Coaching career (HC unless noted)
- 1999–2001: Balko (OK) HS
- 2001–2004: Liberal (KS) HS
- 2004–2005: Seward County CC (assistant)
- 2005–2018: Seward County CC
- 2018–2023: Emporia State

Head coaching record
- Overall: 442–136 (.765)

Accomplishments and honors

Championships
- 4 KJCCC regular season 2 Region VI Tournament championships

Awards
- 3 KJCCC West Coach of the Year (2007, 2016, 2017); NJCAA District F Coach of the Year (2007)

Toby Daryl Wynn (born November 26, 1975) is an American former college women's basketball coach, serving from 2018 to 2023 at Emporia State University. leading the Lady Hornets to three NCAA Tournament appearances in five years, and from 2005 to 2018, for Seward County Community College, where he led the Lady Saints to four conference championships, 20-plus wins for 13 consecutive years, and appeared in the NJCAA Tournament in four seasons.

== Career ==
=== Early coaching career ===
Wynn, born in Booker, Texas, began his coaching career in Balko, Oklahoma, at the local high school while attending Oklahoma State University–Stillwater. He coached there for two years before moving to Kansas to become the Liberal High School coach in 2001. He left in 2004. Wynn served as an assistant coach at Seward County Community College under Jim Littell, current head coach at Oklahoma State, before Littell left for Oklahoma State.

=== Seward County Community College ===
Wynn coached at Seward County from 2005 until 2018. During his time at Seward County, Wynn posted a 349–84 (.806) overall record, 182–47 (.795) conference record, and has won four conference regular season championships, two Region VI Tournament championships, and one National Junior College Athletic Association District F Coach of the Year in 2007.

=== Emporia State University ===
On April 6, 2018, Wynn was announced as the seventh head coach at for Emporia State Lady Hornets basketball, an NCAA Division II school. In his first year at Emporia State, Wynn led the Lady Hornets to a 22–9 overall, 13–6 conference finish, landing them tied for fifth place in conference play. Wynn resigned after the 2022–23 season, finishing the season with a 14–15 overall record, 9–13 conference record.

== Head coach record ==
Record table
Season	Team	Overall	Conference	Standing	Postseason
Seward County Lady Saints (Kansas Jayhawk Community College Conference) (2005–2018)
2005–06	Seward County	25–7	10–6	4th	Region VI Quarterfinals
2006–07	Seward County	36–2	15–1	1st	Region VI champions NJCAA Tournament 5th Place
2007–08	Seward County	23–9	13–3	2nd	Region VI Quarterfinals
2008–09	Seward County	28–6	13–3	2nd	Region VI runner-up
2009–10	Seward County	31–3	15–1	1st	Region VI runner-up
2010–11	Seward County	21–11	10–6	4th	Region VI Quarterfinals
2011–12	Seward County	23–8	11–5	2nd	Region VI Quarterfinals
2012–13	Seward County	20–11	10–6	4th	Region VI Quarterfinals
2013–14	Seward County	26–6	10–4	2nd	Region VI Quarterfinals
2014–15	Seward County	28–6	13–3	2nd	Region VI semifinals NJCAA Tournament 5th Place
2015–16	Seward County	25–8	14–5	2nd	Region VI runner-up
2016–17	Seward County	32–3	25–1	1st	Region VI runner-up NJCAA Tournament 5th Place
2017–18	Seward County	31–4	23–3	1st	Region VI champions NJCAA Tournament 5th Place
Seward County:		349–84	182–47		
Emporia State Lady Hornets (Mid-America Intercollegiate Athletics Association) (2018–present)
2018–19	Emporia State	22–9	13–6		NCAA Central Regional
2019–20	Emporia State	24–7	15–4		NCAA Central Regional
2020–21	Emporia State	18–7	17–5		NCAA Central Regional
2021–22	Emporia State	15–14	10–12		
2022–23	Emporia State	14–15	9–13		
Emporia State:		93–52	64–40		
Total:		442–136			
National champion Postseason invitational champion Conference regular season champion Conference regular season and conference tournament champion Division regular season champion Division regular season and conference tournament champion Conference tournament champion
