= Joseph B. Casagrande =

American anthropologist (1915–1982)

Joseph Bartholomew Casagrande (February 14, 1915 – June 2, 1982) was an American anthropologist.

== Early life and education ==
A native of Cincinnati, Ohio, born on February 14, 1915, Casagrande moved with his parents, Louis Bartholomew Casagrande and Alma Hauskee, to Chicago at a young age. When his parents divorced, Casagrande and his mother moved to West Allis, Wisconsin and later Whitefish Bay. After graduating from Whitefish Bay High School as a multisport student athlete, Casagrande earned a bachelor's degree from the University of Wisconsin in 1938, and completed a doctorate in anthropology at Columbia University in 1951.

== Career ==
He began teaching at the University of Illinois at Urbana–Champaign in 1960, and co-founded the school's department of anthropology alongside Julian Steward, Oscar Lewis, and Kenneth L. Hale. Casagrande served as vice president and president of the American Ethnological Society from 1962 to 1964, and was president of the American Anthropological Association in 1973. Over the course of his career, Casagrande was granted fellowship by the AAA, the Royal Anthropological Institute of Great Britain and Ireland, the Society for Applied Anthropology, and the American Association for the Advancement of Science. He remained on the UIUC faculty until his death in 1982. Casagrande died in Las Vegas, Nevada, of a stroke on June 2, 1982.
