= Clifford Trafzer =

American historian and writer

- Education: Oklahoma State University
- Occupations: Historian, writer

Clifford Trafzer is an American historian and writer. He is the Costo Distinguished Professor of American Indian Affairs in the department of history at the University of California, Riverside.

In 2021, Trafzer wrote the book Strong Hearts and Healing Hands: Southern California Indians and Field Nurses, 1920–1950, published by the University of Arizona Press.
