= Groendyke Transport =

American trucking company

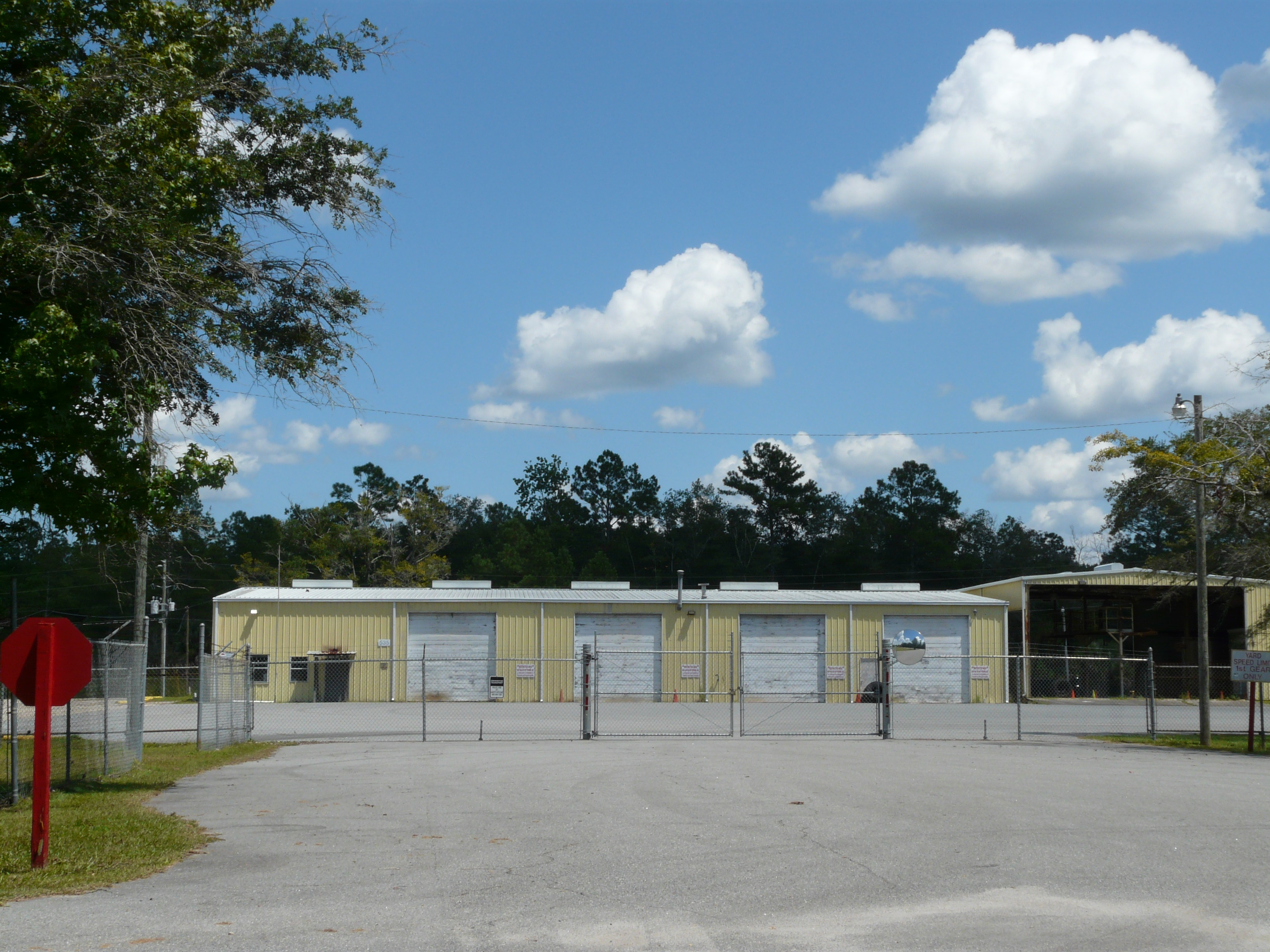
- Terminal in St. Marks, Florida
- Industry: Trucking
- Founded: 1932
- Founder: H. C. Groendyke
- Headquarters: Enid, Oklahoma
- Area served: United States; Mexico; Canada
- Key people: Greg Hodgen (CEO); Joe Morrissey (President); David Snapp (Senior Vice President of Operations)
- Website: groendyke.com

Groendyke Transport is a tank truck carrier in the United States with headquarters in Enid, Oklahoma. The company was founded on July 12, 1932, by H. C. Groendyke as the sole proprietor and incorporated in 1949.

The company currently has 40 terminals in 15 states hauling more than 400,000 loads annually of chemicals, acids, fuels, lubricants, flour, and vegetable oils throughout the United States, Canada, and Mexico, as an ISO 9001 registered carrier.

== History ==
Before the company's founding, refined fuels were transported by railcar. A young Harold Groendyke saw an opportunity and took it creating a tank truck industry. In 1935, H.C. Groendyke moved the company headquarters to Enid, Ok (where it remains today) to be closer to Eason oil and Champlin refineries.

The company was incorporated in 1949. Groendyke Transport continued to expand and in 1965 the company became international. It made its first delivery into Mexico. The company continued to expand throughout the 1970s and 1980s and made its first trip to Canada in 1988. The company is also known as a "military friendly" employer for veterans.

In 2018, Groendyke Transport acquired all of the tank truck assets from McKenzie Tank Lines.

The current CEO of Groendyke Transport is Greg Hodgen and senior vice president of operations is David Snapp. In January 2024, Joe Morrissey was announced as president of Groendyke.

== Terminals ==
The company has terminal locations in Arizona, Arkansas, Colorado, Florida, Georgia (U.S. state), Illinois, Kansas, Louisiana, New Mexico, North Carolina, Oklahoma, South Carolina, Texas and Wyoming. They ship many different materials in and out of these terminals on a daily basis. They also have some international business.

== Company size ==
As of 2022 the company has an annual revenue of $225 million and employs a staff of approximately 1,250.

== Awards ==
Groendyke is an eight-time recipient of the Heil safety award trophy. The award is presented by National Tank Truck Carriers (NTTC) with Heil Trailers International as a co-sponsor.
