= Elliott D. Canonge =

American linguist

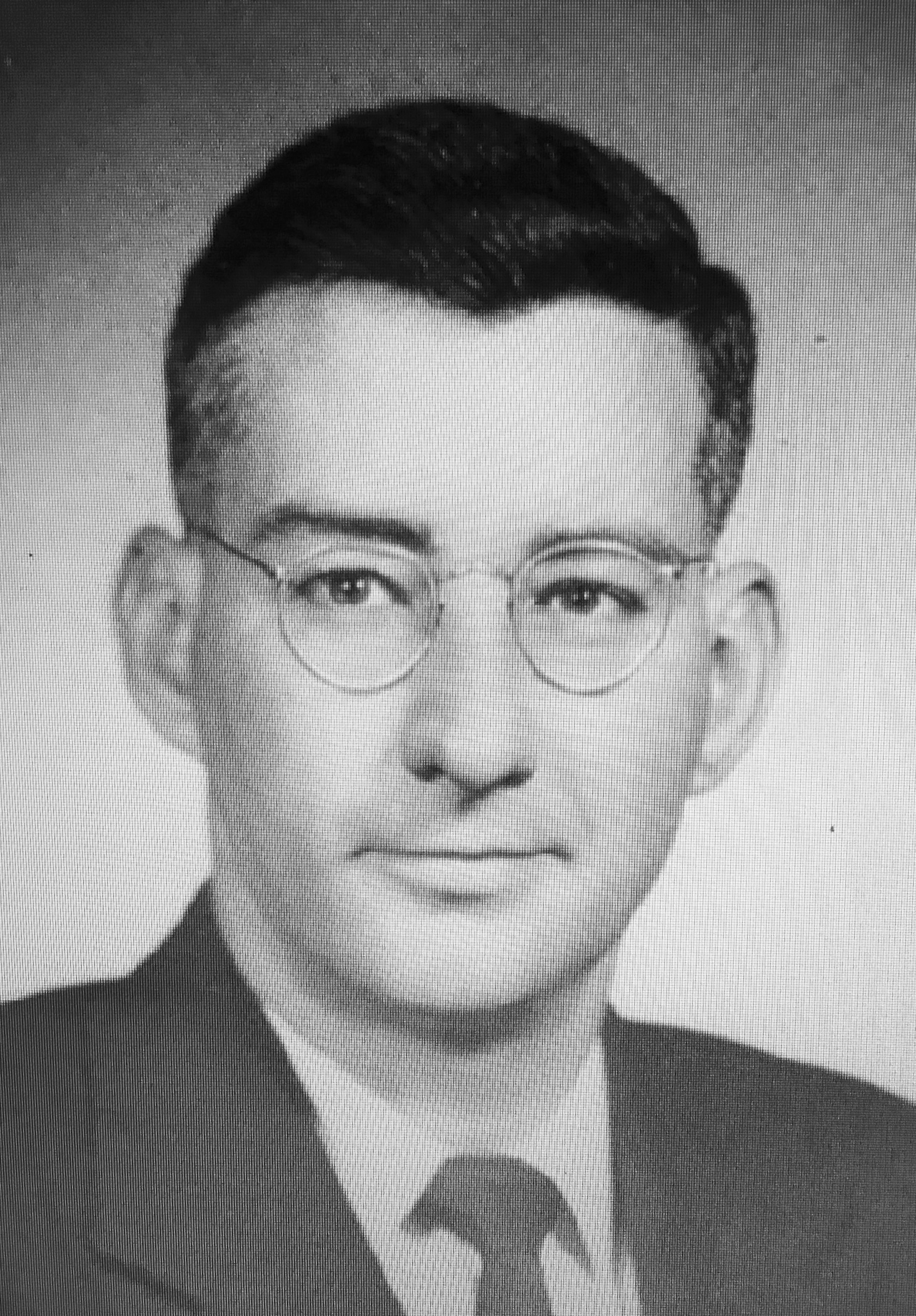
Elliott Canonge, linguist

Elliott D. Canonge (1921 – September 21, 1971) was an author and linguist who worked closely with the Comanche and Alaskan Inuit and Athabaskan groups in documenting their language and culture. Canonge worked primarily through grants by Wycliffe Bible Translators as well as related coursework with the Summer Institute of Linguistics on the campus of Oklahoma State University where he was a staff member and an alumnist. Notably, Canonge instructed Native American students to also conduct their own fieldwork, including documenting and speaking the language while many of his contemporaries were only translating the text into English.

At various times, Elliott was assisted by his wife Viola Frew, in writing and recording the Comanche language, as well as overseeing his materials.

A major informant of Comanche language and stories was Emily Riddles of Walters, Oklahoma.

== Bibliography ==
- Comanche Primer, vol. 3 (1948)
- Comanche Frames (1949)
- Comanche Texts (with Emily Riddles), compiled by Elliott Canonge. 1955.
- Voiceless Vowels in Comanche: International Journal of American Linguistics 23, 1957.
- Comanche Texts. Summer Institute of Linguistics Publications in Linguistics 1.. Norman: Summer Institute of Linguistics. (University of Oklahoma 1958)
- Mark-ha tsaatu narumu'ipu: The Gospel According to Mark. New York: American Bible Society (1959)
- Unpublished Comanche texts, in possession of John E. McLaughlin.
- Notes on Uto-Aztecan languages compiled from various sources(undated). Notes on Comanche and Papago grammar and an English-Tubatulabal vocabulary, compiled from published sources. (Survey of California and Other Indian Languages, University of California, Berkeley)
- Comanche Hymns, compiled by Elliott Canonge. 1960.
- An introduction to the Comanche language (Viola and Elliott Canonge)
- A Teacher's guide for teaching English to the native children of Alaska (Eskimo and Athapaskan) College, Alaska : Alaska Rural School Project, University of Alaska, 1968.

=== Audio ===
- Sound Recording Log. Recorded by Elliott and Viola Canonge. Oklahoma, Carnegie
- Comanche language. (1955–1965)
- Phonemics (1962)
- Comanche : hymns from the prairie (1996) by Cornel Pewewardy; Elliott Canonge; Brulé.; Sound of America Records (Firm)
