= Journal of Virological Methods =

- Cover of March 2020 issue
- Discipline: Immunology and Microbiology
- Language: English
- Edited by: P.K.S. Chand

Publication details
- History: 1980–present
- Publisher: Elsevier
- Frequency: Monthly
- Impact factor: 2.623 (2021)

Standard abbreviations
- ISO 4: J. Virol. Methods

Indexing
- ISSN: 0166-0934 (print); 1879-0984 (web)
- OCLC no.: 6403038

Links
- Journal homepage; Online access

The Journal of Virological Methods is a monthly peer-reviewed scientific journal covering techniques on all aspects of virology. The journal was established in 1980. According to the Journal Citation Reports, the journal has a 2020 impact factor of 2.014.
