= Robert P. Celarier =

American botanist

- Born: 1921
- Died: December 23, 1959 (aged 37–38)
- Scientific career
- Fields: Botanist, Agrostologist

Robert Paul Celarier (1921–1959) was a botanist and agrostologist, who performed extensively as a professor of the "Department of Botany and Plant Pathology" at Oklahoma State University.

== Oklahoma State University ==
At Oklahoma State University, Dr. Celarier's work primarily focused on cytotaxonomy of certain members of the grass family. He wrote and published nearly 30 articles in 16 different scientific journals, and at the time of his death had eight Ph.D. candidates working under his direction.

== Publications ==
- Robert P. Celarier. 1955. Studies on Old World bluestems. Technical bulletin, Oklahoma A & M College, Division of Agriculture, Experimental Station. 31 pp.
- Robert P. Celarier, Jack R. Harlan. 1956. An Andropogoneae Garden in Oklahoma. Taxon 5 (8): 183-186

. 1956. Tertiary Butyl Alcohol Dehydration of Chromosome Smears. Biotechnic & Histochemistry 31 (4): 155-157

- 1957. Elyonurus argenteus, a South African Grass with Five Chromosome Pairs. Bull. of the Torrey Botanical Club 84 (3): 157-162

, Ripusudan L. Paliwal. 1957. Basic Chromosome Number of Four in the Subfamily Panicoideae of the Gramineae. Science 126 (3285): 1247-1248

- K.L. Mehra, M.L. Wulf. 1958. Cytogeography of the Dichanthium annulatum complex. Brittonia 10 (2): 59-72
- 1959. Desynapsis in the Andropogoneae. Proc. Oklahoma Academy of Sci. 39: 6-9
