= Great Lakes Valley Conference women's basketball tournament =

- Conference basketball championship
- Sport: Basketball
- Conference: Great Lakes Valley Conference
- Format: Single-elimination tournament
- Played: 1998–present
- Current champion: Maryville (2nd)
- Most championships: Drury (10)
- Official website: GLVC women's basketball

The Great Lakes Valley Conference (GLVC) women's basketball tournament is the annual women's basketball championship tournament for the Great Lakes Valley Conference. The tournament was established in 1998, twenty years after the conference was founded in 1978. It is a single-elimination tournament and seeding is based on regular season records.

The tournament bracket has included as few as seven teams and as many as fifteen. The most common format has featured eight teams competing at the same predesignated neutral site as the GLVC men's basketball tournament. In 1998, 2008, 2009, and 2021, the quarterfinals were played on campus sites (hosted by the teams in the top half of the bracket) and the final four was held on the home court of the highest seed surviving the quarterfinals.

The tournament winner is conference champion and receives the GLVC's automatic bid to the NCAA Division II women's basketball tournament.

Drury has won the most tournaments, with ten.

== Results ==
Year	Champions	Score	Runner-up	Site
1998	Southern Indiana	83–70	SIU Edwardsville	PAC Arena, University of Southern Indiana (Evansville, IN)
1999	Northern Kentucky	74–72	Bellarmine	Roberts Stadium (Evansville, IN)
2000	Northern Kentucky (2)	77–57	Indianapolis	Roberts Stadium (Evansville, IN)
2001	Southern Indiana (2)	95–73	Northern Kentucky	Roberts Stadium (Evansville, IN)
2002	Southern Indiana (3)	89–79	Northern Kentucky	Roberts Stadium (Evansville, IN)
2003	Indianapolis	74–63	Quincy	Roberts Stadium (Evansville, IN)
2004	Quincy	57–45	Indianapolis	Roberts Stadium (Evansville, IN)
2005	Quincy (2)	66–60	Indianapolis	Roberts Stadium (Evansville, IN)
2006	Northern Kentucky (3)	86–73	Drury	Roberts Stadium (Evansville, IN)
2007	Lewis	69–52	Drury	Roberts Stadium (Evansville, IN)
2008	Drury	71–67	Northern Kentucky	Weiser Gym, Drury University (Springfield, MO)
2009	Northern Kentucky (4)	77–72	Quincy	Pepsi Arena, Quincy University (Quincy, IL)
2010	Drury (2)	68–63	Wisconsin–Parkside	The Recreation and Athletic Center, University of Illinois - Springfield (Springfield, IL)
2011	Lewis (2)	71–68	Indianapolis	Moloney Arena, Maryville University (Town and Country, MO)
2012	Maryville	75–62	Kentucky Wesleyan	Prairie Capital Convention Center (Springfield, IL)
2013	Lewis (3)	76–61	Maryville	Ford Center (Evansville, IN)
2014	Truman State	58–45	Maryville	Ford Center (Evansville, IN)
2015	Drury (3)	68–65	Southern Indiana	Family Arena (St. Charles, MO)
2016	Bellarmine	89–78	Quincy	Family Arena (St. Charles, MO)
2017	Drury (4)	67–63	Lewis	Ford Center (Evansville, IN)
2018	Drury (5)	62–52	Southern Indiana	Vadalabene Center (Edwardsville, IL)
2019	Drury (6)	94–48	Bellarmine	Vadalabene Center (Edwardsville, IL)
2020	Drury (7)	77–55	Lewis	Vadalabene Center (Edwardsville, IL)
2021	Drury (8)	76–70	Truman State	O'Reilly Family Event Center, Drury University (Springfield, MO)
2022	Drury (9)	76–47	Lewis	Vadalabene Center (Edwardsville, IL)
2023	Drury (10)	71–52	Lewis	Hyland Performance Arena (St. Charles, MO)
2024	Lewis (4)	79–67	Drury	Hyland Performance Arena (St. Charles, MO)
2025	Quincy (3)	64–60	Maryville	Hyland Performance Arena (St. Charles, MO)
2026	Maryville (2)	83–75 (OT)	Missouri–St. Louis	Mark Twain Building, University of Missouri - St. Louis (St. Louis, MO)

== Championship records ==
School	Finals Record	Finals Appearances	Championship Years
Missouri–St. Louis	0–1	1	
Drury	10–3	13	2008, 2010, 2015, 2017, 2018, 2019, 2020, 2021, 2022, 2023
Lewis	4–4	8	2007, 2011, 2013, 2024
Northern Kentucky	4–3	7	1999, 2000, 2006, 2009
Southern Indiana	3–2	5	1998, 2001, 2002
Quincy	3–3	6	2004, 2005, 2025
Indianapolis	1–4	5	2003
Maryville	2–3	5	2012, 2026
Bellarmine	1–2	3	2016
Truman State	1–1	2	2014
Kentucky Wesleyan	0–1	1	
SIU Edwardsville	0–1	1	
Wisconsin–Parkside	0–1	1	

- Illinois–Springfield, Lincoln (MO), McKendree, Missouri S&T, Rockhurst, Southwest Baptist, Upper Iowa, and William Jewell have not yet reached the finals of the GLVC tournament.
- IPFW, Lindenwood, and Saint Joseph's never reached the tournament finals before departing the GLVC.
- Schools highlighted in pink are former GLVC members, as of the 2024–25 season.

== See also ==
- Great Lakes Valley Conference men's basketball tournament
