= Great Lakes Valley Conference men's basketball tournament =

- Conference basketball championship
- Sport: Basketball
- Conference: Great Lakes Valley Conference
- Format: Single-elimination tournament
- Played: 1998–present
- Current champion: William Jewell (2nd)
- Most championships: Bellarmine (5), Kentucky Wesleyan (5)
- Official website: GLVC men's basketball

The Great Lakes Valley Conference (GLVC) men's basketball tournament is the annual men's basketball championship tournament for the Great Lakes Valley Conference. The tournament was established in 1998, twenty years after the conference was founded in 1978. It is a single-elimination tournament and seeding is based on regular season records.

The tournament bracket has included as few as seven teams and as many as fifteen. The most common format has featured eight teams competing at the same predesignated neutral site as the GLVC women's basketball tournament. In 1998, 2008, 2009, and 2021, the quarterfinals were played on campus sites (hosted by the teams in the top half of the bracket) and the final four was held on the home court of the highest seed surviving the quarterfinals.

The tournament winner is conference champion and receives the GLVC's automatic bid to the NCAA Division II men's basketball tournament.

Former members Kentucky Wesleyan and Bellarmine have won the most tournaments, with five apiece.

== Results ==
Year	Champions	Score	Runner-up	Site
1998	Kentucky Wesleyan	94–81	Southern Indiana	Sportscenter (Owensboro, KY)
1999	Kentucky Wesleyan	95–84	Southern Indiana	Roberts Stadium (Evansville, IN)
2000	Kentucky Wesleyan	90–88	Southern Indiana	Roberts Stadium (Evansville, IN)
2001	Kentucky Wesleyan	91–74	Southern Indiana	Roberts Stadium (Evansville, IN)
2002	Lewis	77–65	Kentucky Wesleyan	Roberts Stadium (Evansville, IN)
2003	Northern Kentucky	58–55	Lewis	Roberts Stadium (Evansville, IN)
2004	Kentucky Wesleyan	72–71 (OT)	Lewis	Roberts Stadium (Evansville, IN)
2005	Southern Indiana	79–49	Northern Kentucky	Roberts Stadium (Evansville, IN)
2006	Saint Joseph's	68–67	Quincy	Roberts Stadium (Evansville, IN)
2007	Southern Indiana	63–61	Northern Kentucky	Roberts Stadium (Evansville, IN)
2008	Drury	89–87 (OT)	Lewis	Weiser Gym, Drury University (Springfield, MO)
2009	Northern Kentucky	69–47	Bellarmine	PAC Arena, University of Southern Indiana (Evansville, IN)
2010	Bellarmine	79–69	Kentucky Wesleyan	The Recreation and Athletic Center, University of Illinois - Springfield (Springfield, IL)
2011	Bellarmine	87–81 (OT)	Southern Indiana	Moloney Arena, Maryville University (Town and Country, MO)
2012	Southern Indiana	60–56	Northern Kentucky	Prairie Capital Convention Center (Springfield, IL)
2013	Drury	71–65	Southern Indiana	Ford Center (Evansville, IN)
2014	Southern Indiana	86–73	Bellarmine	Ford Center (Evansville, IN)
2015	Drury	77–70	Bellarmine	Family Arena (St. Charles, MO)
2016	Lewis	80–71	Wisconsin–Parkside	Family Arena (St. Charles, MO)
2017	Bellarmine	74–61	Lewis	Ford Center (Evansville, IN)
2018	Bellarmine	75–61	Truman State	Vadalabene Center (Edwardsville, IL)
2019	Bellarmine	65–48	Drury	Vadalabene Center (Edwardsville, IL)
2020	Truman State	53–52	Missouri–St. Louis	Vadalabene Center (Edwardsville, IL)
2021	Lewis	76–71	Drury	Mark Twain Building, University of Missouri - St. Louis (St. Louis, MO)
2022	Missouri–St. Louis	66–56	Indianapolis	Vadalabene Center (Edwardsville, IL)
2023	McKendree	62–51	Missouri–St. Louis	Hyland Performance Arena (St. Charles, MO)
2024	William Jewell	83–65	Lewis	Hyland Performance Arena (St. Charles, MO)
2025	Lincoln (MO)	58–51	Missouri–St. Louis	Hyland Performance Arena (St. Charles, MO)
2026	William Jewell	67–48	Drury	Mark Twain Building, University of Missouri - St. Louis (St. Louis, MO)

== Championship records ==
School	Finals Record	Finals Appearances	Championship Years
Kentucky Wesleyan	5–2	7	1998, 1999, 2000, 2001, 2004
Bellarmine	5–3	8	2010, 2011, 2017, 2018, 2019
Southern Indiana	4–6	10	2005, 2007, 2012, 2014
Lewis	3–5	8	2002, 2016, 2021
Drury	3–3	6	2008, 2013, 2015
Northern Kentucky	2–3	5	2003, 2009
Missouri–St. Louis	1–3	4	2022
Truman	1–1	2	2020
Lincoln (MO)	1–0	1	2025
McKendree	1–0	1	2023
William Jewell	2–0	2	2024, 2026
Saint Joseph's	1–0	1	2006
Indianapolis	0–1	1	
Quincy	0–1	1	
Wisconsin–Parkside	0–1	1	

- Illinois–Springfield, Maryville, Missouri S&T, Rockhurst, Southwest Baptist, and Upper Iowa have not yet reached the finals of the GLVC tournament.
- Lindenwood, IPFW, and SIU Edwardsville never reached the tournament finals before departing the GLVC.
- Schools highlighted in pink are former GLVC members, as of the 2026–27 season.

== See also ==
- Great Lakes Valley Conference women's basketball tournament
