= Dan Shipp =

Tenth president of Pittsburgh State university

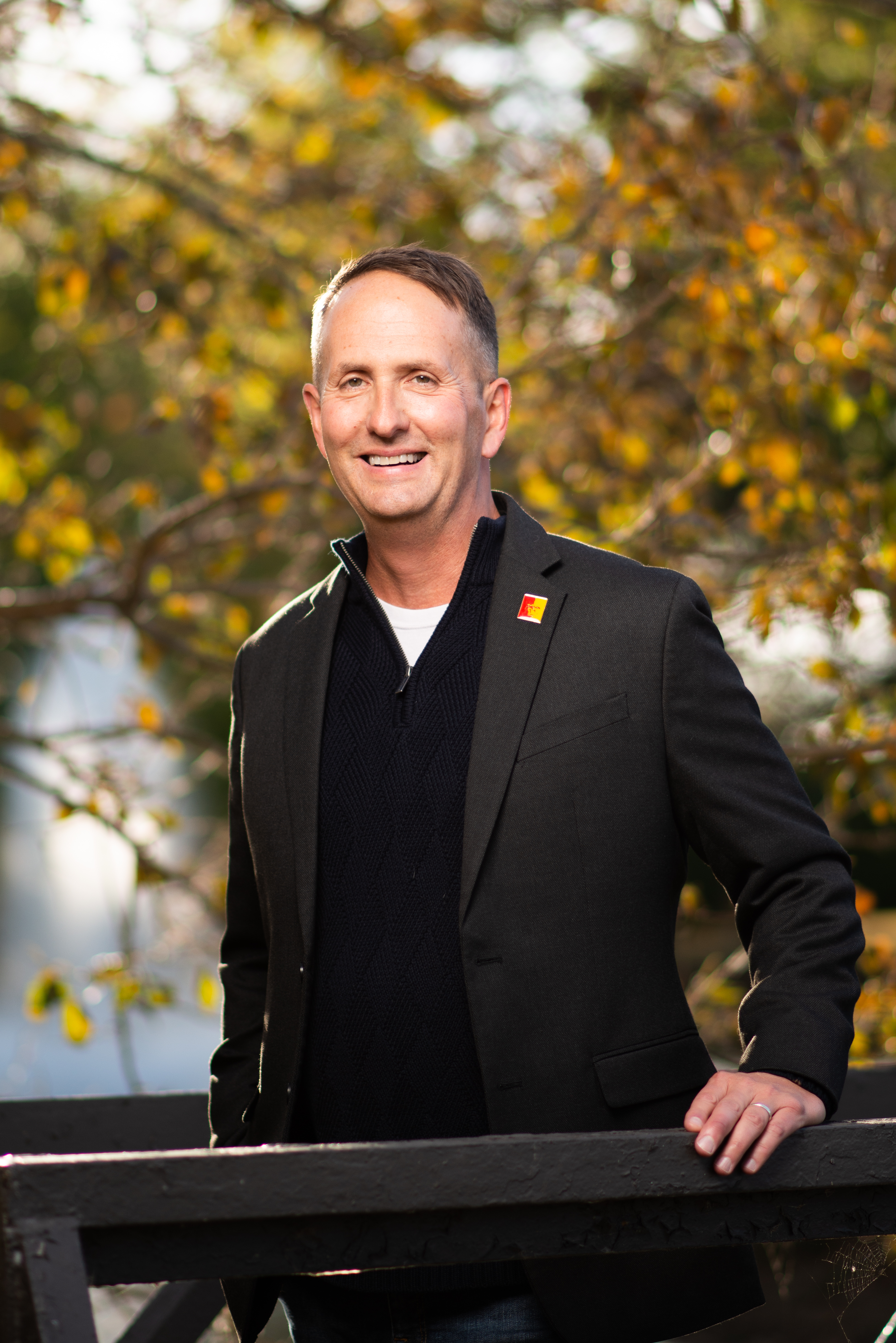

11th President of Maryville University
- Incumbent
- Assumed office June 2025
- Preceded by: Mark Lombardi

10th President of Pittsburg State University
- In office June 6, 2022 – May 2025
- Preceded by: Steven A. Scott
- Succeeded by: Thomas Newsom

Personal details
- Spouse: Vanessa
- Education: University of Nebraska–Lincoln (BA); University of Nebraska Omaha (MA); University of the Pacific (EdD)
- Profession: Professor
- Website: Office of the President

Daniel J. Shipp, is an American educator and President of Maryville University. Prior to Maryville, he served as president at Pittsburg State University from June 2022 until May 2024. Shipp served in multiple roles between the University of Nebraska Medical Center and University of Nebraska Omaha for the previous ten years. On February 18th, 2025, Shipp was announced as the 11th President of Maryville University, effective June 2025.

== Biography ==
=== Education ===
Shipp attended the University of Nebraska–Lincoln, where he graduated with a bachelor of arts in education. Shipp then went on to receive his master of arts in education degree in 1993 from the University of Nebraska Omaha and his educational doctorate from the University of the Pacific.

=== Early career ===
After graduating with his master's in 1993, Shipp served three years as the campus recreation services assistant director for UNO, before serving ten years at the University of Missouri as its senior associate director for recreation services from 1996 to 2006. While at Missouri, Shipp helped raise $50 million for a new recreation complex. In 2006, Shipp left Missouri for the University of the Pacific, where he served as associate vice chancellor for student life. There was the force behind a $40 million university center.

=== University of Nebraska system ===
In 2012, Shipp returned to UNO to serve as vice chancellor of student affairs. He served in that capacity for eight years where he helped transform student success at the university by expanding enrollment numbers and graduation rates, as well as fundraising $200 million plus for campus improvements. Shipp also was the lead executive at the university to guide the campus through the COVID-19 pandemic. On November 1, 2021, Shipp was named vice chancellor for strategic initiatives at the University of Nebraska Medical Center.

=== Pittsburg State University ===
On April 8, 2022, the Kansas Board of Regents announced Shipp as the 10th president of Pittsburg State University. He began on June 6, 2022. At Pitt State, Shipp introduced the automatic awarding of Associate of Arts degrees as students earn them, making Pitt State the first institution in Kansas to do so. Under his leadership, the university created and operationalized a new strategic plan, launched a new Student Success Center to improve student retention and graduation, secured a $10 million investment from Crossland to enhance programs within the College of Technology, and introduced the Great Gorilla Scholarship Program to reduce financial barriers for students. In addition to his role as president, Shipp served as interim dean of the Crossland College of Technology.

Through $50 million in public and private partnerships, Shipp led the reimagining of the Kelce College of Business in downtown Pittsburg. Construction began in fall 2024 and the new school will open in 2026. The project also includes repurposing the historic Besse Hotel to accommodate housing for students and a new home for the university's Center for Reading.

=== Maryville University of St. Louis ===
On February 18, 2025, Dan Shipp was announced to accept the position of University President at Maryville University. He began his new position in June 2025. Dr. Shipp was selected to succeed Dr. Mark Lombardi, who retired at the end of the academic year after 18 years. Dan is Maryville University's 11th President.
