= Great Lakes Valley Conference =

NCAA Division II college athletic conference

- Association: NCAA
- Founded: 1978
- Commissioner: Jim Naumovich (since 2000)
- Sports fielded: 27; men's: 13; women's: 14
- Division: Division II
- No. of teams: 15 (14 in 2027)
- Headquarters: Indianapolis, Indiana
- Region: Central United States
- Website: glvcsports.com

Locations
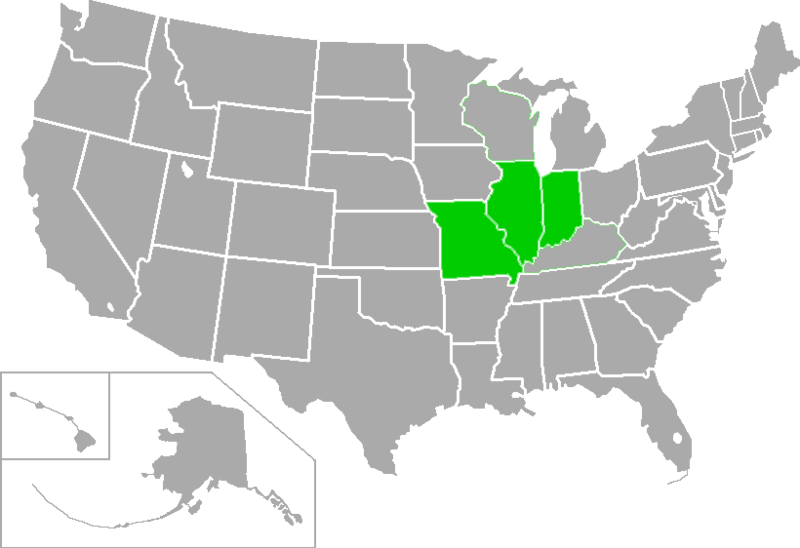

The Great Lakes Valley Conference (GLVC) is a college athletic conference affiliated with the National Collegiate Athletic Association (NCAA) at the Division II level. Its fifteen member institutions are located in the U.S. states of Illinois, Indiana, Iowa, and Missouri. There are also thirteen associate members that participate in sports not sponsored by their home conferences.

== History ==
=== Formation ===
Old logo

Great Lakes Valley Conference
Location of GLVC full members: current, departing

The GLVC grew out of discussions that started in 1982 between the athletic directors of Kentucky Wesleyan College, Bellarmine College (today Bellarmine University), and Indiana State University at Evansville (renamed University of Southern Indiana in 1985), with the goal of forming a men's basketball conference. The discussions eventually included Indiana Central University (renamed University of Indianapolis in 1986), Saint Joseph's College, and Ashland College (today Ashland University). On July 7, 1978, at a meeting in Louisville hosted by Bellarmine, these six schools formed the GLVC, with the intention of competing in the 1978–79 season. Ashland, though considered a charter member, did not begin conference play until the league's second season, in 1979–80. From the time of its founding, the GLVC has been a member of NCAA Division II.

While the origins of the conference's name are lost to history, its initial Ohio-Indiana-Kentucky footprint was bordered by the Great Lakes in the north and the Ohio Valley in the south. Following Southern Indiana's departure in July 2023, Indianapolis is the only remaining charter member. On June 24, 2026, Indianapolis announced that it will leave the GLVC for the Great Midwest Athletic Conference (G-MAC) effective July 1, 2027.

The GLVC has been led by a full-time commissioner since 1996, first Carl McAloose (1996–2000), then Jim Naumovich (2000–present). The conference office is located in Indianapolis. From 1978 to 1996, the Faculty Athletics Representatives (FARs) of the member institutions were responsible for operating the conference. The FARs (rather than the athletic directors) still cast the institutional votes at meetings where the presidents and chancellors are not present. This feature gives the GLVC a governance structure that is unique among Division I and Division II conferences.

Though conceived as a men's basketball league, the GLVC from the start planned to sponsor championships in golf, tennis, baseball, cross country, and track & field. The conference crowned golf and tennis champions in 1978-79 and added cross country and baseball the following year. Soccer became the sixth sport rather than track & field, with the first conference tournament held in 1980. In 1982, when the demise of the Association of Intercollegiate Athletics for Women (AIAW) brought women's college athletics under the NCAA, the GLVC began to sponsor women's sports. Within two years, the conference added women's championships in basketball, tennis, cross country, volleyball, and softball.

=== Expansion of membership and sport sponsorship ===
The conference experienced steady growth through the first three decades of its existence, expanding from six members to sixteen. The first addition was Lewis University in 1980, followed in 1984 by Indiana University – Purdue University Fort Wayne (IPFW; the athletic program is now Purdue Fort Wayne), then Northern Kentucky University in 1985 and Kentucky State University in 1989. The conference lost its first members with the departure of Ashland and Kentucky State, effective summer 1995, but increased in size when Quincy University, Southern Illinois University Edwardsville (SIUE) and the University of Wisconsin–Parkside began competition that fall, followed by the University of Missouri–St. Louis (UMSL) one year later. These changes initiated a westward shift in the GLVC's geographical footprint that has continued to the present.

The 1990s also featured an expansion in sports sponsorship. In 1995–96 the GLVC crowned its first champions in women's soccer and in men's and women's track and field. Women's golf was added in 1998–99, followed by men's and women's indoor track and field in 1999–2000. These additions increased the total number of conference sports from eleven to seventeen.

After IPFW left in 2001 to move to Division I, the GLVC considered further expansion, but not before redefining conference membership in 2005 to require the athletic program of each member to include seven core sports (men's and women's basketball, women's volleyball, men's and women's soccer, softball, and baseball). The eleven members at the time all sponsored these sports, and subsequent new members would be required to sponsor them as well. Previously, the GLVC had no sports sponsorship requirement other than the NCAA Division II minimum (that every member must sponsor at least ten sports, including men's and women's basketball). The conference began awarding the Commissioner's Cup to the member institution with the greatest success across the seven core sports, while continuing to award its All-Sports Trophy to the most successful program overall.

In the fall of 2005, the GLVC welcomed three more members—Drury University, Rockhurst University, and the University of Missouri-Rolla (known as Missouri University of Science and Technology, or Missouri S&T, since 2008). SIUE left for Division I and the Ohio Valley Conference in 2008, but the conference continued to grow with the additions of Maryville University and the University of Illinois Springfield, which began GLVC competition in the fall of 2009. The GLVC reached sixteen members with the admission of William Jewell College, which began competing in fall 2011.

As the conference continued to grow, basketball remained its strongest sport, and the conference tournament, usually including both genders at the same neutral site, became its signature event. A GLVC team played in the championship game of the NCAA Division II men's basketball tournament in eleven consecutive seasons (1993–94 through 2003–4). Kentucky Wesleyan, winner of four men's national championships prior to the creation of the GLVC, won four more as a conference member, while Southern Indiana, Bellarmine, and Drury won one apiece, and Northern Kentucky won two women's national championships. Meanwhile, the GLVC became the leading Division II conference in swimming and diving. During its first decade in the conference, Drury won ten men's national championships and four women's national championships in the sport. After men's and women's swimming and diving became conference sports in 2013–14, the annual GLVC swimming and diving meet grew to become the most financially lucrative of the conference's championship events, surpassing the basketball tournament.

The admission of William Jewell, approved in October 2009, gave the conference six football-playing members (along with Indianapolis, Kentucky Wesleyan, St. Joseph's, Quincy, and Missouri S&T), the minimum number needed to sponsor the sport. This set in motion plans to crown a football champion, ultimately starting in fall 2012. The addition of football in the GLVC's 35th year of competition was a historic move, as no conference at any level of the NCAA (Division I, II, or III) founded without football had ever added it after existing for so long as a non-football conference. Before competition began, the original six football-playing members were joined by new full member McKendree University and the GLVC's first associate members, Central State University and Urbana University, to give the conference nine teams for its initial football season. Though they competed in the GLVC for just one year, Central State and Urbana eventually were followed by nineteen other schools admitted to the league as associates in one or more sports while maintaining full membership elsewhere.

Just as the GLVC was adding football, the conference lost two of its premier basketball programs. In the fall of 2012, Northern Kentucky moved to Division I and the Atlantic Sun Conference (ASUN), and one year later, Kentucky Wesleyan left to become a charter member of the newly formed Great Midwest Athletic Conference (G-MAC). Meanwhile, the GLVC welcomed Truman State University into the conference, to begin competition in 2013–14. The additions of McKendree (coinciding with the departure of Northern Kentucky) and Truman State (coinciding with the departure of Kentucky Wesleyan) kept the GLVC at sixteen members.

In 2014, a unique interconference football partnership with the Mid-America Intercollegiate Athletics Association (MIAA) allowed Lincoln University and Southwest Baptist University to join the GLVC in football while otherwise remaining MIAA members. That autumn, the GLVC became the first NCAA Division II conference to create an inclusive league-wide digital streaming network – the GLVC Sports Network (GLVCSN), which subsequently broadcast football and all other conference sports.

Drury and Bellarmine started wrestling programs for the 2016–17 season, enabling the conference to add wrestling as its 21st championship sport. The initial seven-team GLVC wrestling lineup also included Indianapolis, Maryville, McKendree, Truman State, and Wisconsin–Parkside, all former Division II wrestling independents.

The following year, the GLVC announced the addition of men's lacrosse as its 22nd championship sport, in partnership with the Gulf South Conference (GSC) and Peach Belt Conference (PBC). The initial six-team lineup for spring 2018 included Indianapolis, Maryville, and four southern associate members (Young Harris College, the University of Alabama in Huntsville, the University of Montevallo, and Shorter University). The partnership lasted for three seasons, after which the GLVC and GSC-PBC each had enough lacrosse-playing members to offer separate championships in the sport.

=== Recent history ===
Charter member St. Joseph's College closed in May 2017 because of financial troubles. One year later, Wisconsin–Parkside left the GLVC to join the Great Lakes Intercollegiate Athletic Conference (GLIAC). Their departures reduced the conference to fourteen members.

In fall 2019 conference membership returned to 16 with the addition of two schools from the MIAA, Southwest Baptist (elevated from football-only associate to full membership) and Lindenwood University. Their admission voided the MIAA-GLVC football partnership of the previous five seasons (2014 through 2018) and resulted in Lincoln rejoining MIAA football. After just one year the conference reverted to fifteen members, as charter member Bellarmine moved to Division I and the ASUN, effective fall 2020.

In 2019 the GLVC and G-MAC established the annual America's Crossroads Bowl (later rebranded as the Albanese Candy Bowl) in Hobart, Indiana, featuring their highest-ranking football teams not qualifying for the NCAA Division II playoffs. In the 2021 and 2022 seasons, members of the two conferences also played a two-game crossover in the third and fourth Saturdays of the football season.

The GLVC added two women's sports for 2019–20, bowling and lacrosse, bringing the total number of conference sports to 24. In women's bowling, the initial lineup included 2017 national champion McKendree, fellow full members Drury, Lewis, and Maryville, plus associate members Lincoln, the University of Central Missouri, and Upper Iowa University. In women's lacrosse, the initial lineup in spring 2020 consisted of seven full members—regional powers Lindenwood and Indianapolis, along with Lewis, Maryville, McKendree, Quincy, and Rockhurst. The two sports were an immediate success, with Lindenwood (2021) and Indianapolis (2022) winning national championships in women's lacrosse and McKendree (2022) winning its second national title in women's bowling.

In March 2020, GLVC winter and spring sport competitions ended when the NCAA suspended play due to the COVID-19 pandemic. For the 2020–21 academic year, the GLVC held its fall 2020 conference sport competitions in spring 2021. Of the sixteen Division II conferences sponsoring football at the time, the GLVC was one of just four (with the G-MAC, Mountain East Conference, and South Atlantic Conference) to crown a football champion in spring 2021.

The most recent departures from the GLVC came at the end of the 2021–22 academic year, when charter member Southern Indiana joined Lindenwood in moving to Division I and the Ohio Valley Conference, temporarily reducing the league to thirteen schools. They were replaced by associate member Upper Iowa, admitted to the GLVC as a full member effective fall 2023, and former associate member Lincoln, admitted effective fall 2024.

With the addition of new members, the GLVC amended the core sports requirement that had been in place since 2005. Starting in 2023–24, all full members must sponsor men's and women's basketball, men's and women's soccer, four additional men's sports, and four additional women's sports. The Commissioner's Cup was still awarded based on performance in the sports sponsored by all members; as of 2025–26, these included five women's sports (basketball, soccer, softball, cross country, and track & field) and three men's sports (basketball, soccer, and baseball).

The GLVC added three sports for 2025–26—women's wrestling, men's volleyball, and STUNT—bringing the total number of conference sports to 27. Women's wrestling (2025–26 winter season) debuted in partnership with the GLIAC, with a lineup including full members McKendree, Quincy, Upper Iowa, and William Jewell, and associate members Davenport University, Grand Valley State University, and Northern Michigan University. For men's volleyball (2026 spring season) the initial lineup included full members Maryville, Missouri S&T, Quincy, Rockhurst, and Southwest Baptist, plus associate members Roosevelt University, Thomas More University, and the University of Jamestown. For STUNT (also 2026 spring season), the initial lineup included full members Maryville, Quincy, Southwest Baptist, Drury, and Lewis, plus associate members Ferris State University, Purdue University Northwest, and Trevecca Nazarene University. Of the three new sports, women's wrestling experienced the greatest immediate success, with McKendree winning the 2026 national championship.

On June 24, 2026, the last remaining charter member of the conference, Indianapolis, announced that it will leave the GLVC for the G-MAC, effective July 1, 2027.

=== Divisional play ===
The GLVC first adopted divisional play in 1996, for women's volleyball only. That sport competed in Blue and Green divisions (named for the conference's colors) until 2004, when it returned to a single table. All other sports competed in a single table until the conference expanded to fourteen members in 2005, when two seven-team divisions were adopted for basketball and most other core sports.

The organizational structure of the conference has varied dramatically since then, reflecting changes in membership and in the overall number of league members. As an added variable, the same structure has never been applied across all sports in any given year. For example, since 2005, men's and women's basketball have played in two divisions in ten seasons (from 2005–06 through 2008–09 and again from 2011–12 through 2016–17), three divisions in five seasons (2009–10, 2010–11, 2017–18, 2020–21, and 2021–22), and in a single table in six seasons (2018–19, 2019–20, 2022–23, 2023–24, 2024–25, and 2025–26). Meanwhile, during the same years, men's and women's soccer always played a single table. Two-division structures have been labeled East-West or Blue-Green, while three-division structures have been labeled East-West-North or East-West-Central.

As of 2025–26, the GLVC has divisional play in men's and women's tennis, and plays a single table in all other sports with regular season competition.

== Chronological timeline ==
- 1978: The Great Lakes Valley Conference (GLVC) was founded. Charter members included Ashland College (now Ashland University), Bellarmine College (now Bellarmine University), Indiana Central University (now the University of Indianapolis), Indiana State University at Evansville (now the University of Southern Indiana), Kentucky Wesleyan College, and Saint Joseph's College. Competition began in fall 1978.
- 1980: Lewis University began GLVC competition in fall 1980.
- 1982: The GLVC began to sponsor championships in women's sports.
- 1984: Indiana University–Purdue University Fort Wayne (IPFW) began GLVC competition in fall 1984.
- 1985: Northern Kentucky University began GLVC competition in fall 1985.
- 1989: Kentucky State University began GLVC competition in fall 1989.
- 1995:
  - Ashland and Kentucky State left the GLVC at the end of the 1994–95 academic year. Ashland began competing in the Great Lakes Intercollegiate Athletic Conference (GLIAC) in fall 1995, and Kentucky State joined the Southern Intercollegiate Athletic Conference (SIAC) in fall 1997.
  - Quincy University, Southern Illinois University Edwardsville, and the University of Wisconsin–Parkside began GLVC competition in fall 1995.
- 1996: The University of Missouri–St. Louis began GLVC competition in fall 1996.
- 1998: The GLVC held its first conference tournaments in men's and women's basketball, at the conclusion of the 1997–98 regular season.
- 2000: A record crowd of 9,402 attended the men's final at the GLVC basketball tournament, held at Roberts Stadium in Evansville, Indiana. Kentucky Wesleyan defeated Southern Indiana 90–88.
- 2001: IPFW left the GLVC at the end of the 2000–01 academic year to become an NCAA D-I Independent.
- 2005:
  - Core sports requirement established.
  - Drury University, the University of Missouri–Rolla (now the Missouri University of Science and Technology) and Rockhurst University began GLVC competition in fall 2005.
- 2008: Southern Illinois Edwardsville (SIUE) left the GLVC at the end of the 2007–08 academic year, and joined NCAA Division I as a member of the Ohio Valley Conference (OVC) in fall 2008.
- 2009: The University of Illinois Springfield (UIS) and Maryville University began GLVC competition in fall 2009.
- 2011: William Jewell College began GLVC competition in fall 2011.
- 2012:
  - Northern Kentucky left the GLVC at the end of the 2011–12 academic year, and joined NCAA Division I as a member of the Atlantic Sun Conference (ASUN) in fall 2012.
  - McKendree University began GLVC competition in fall 2012.
  - Central State University and Urbana University joined the GLVC as associate members in football in fall 2012.
- 2013:
  - Kentucky Wesleyan left the GLVC at the end of the 2012–13 academic year, and began competing in the Great Midwest Athletic Conference (G-MAC) in fall 2013. Kentucky Wesleyan remained in the GLVC as an associate member in football for fall 2013.
  - Football associates Central State and Urbana left the GLVC after just one season of competition. Urbana joined the Mountain East Conference as an all-sports member in fall 2013. Central State joined the SIAC as a football associate in fall 2013, then as an all-sports member in fall 2015.
  - Truman State University began GLVC competition in fall 2013.
- 2014:
  - Lincoln University and Southwest Baptist University joined the GLVC as associate members for football in fall 2014.
  - The GLVC Sports Network (GLVCSN) debuted.
- 2017: Saint Joseph's College closed at the end of the 2016–17 academic year.
- 2018:
  - The University of Alabama in Huntsville, the University of Montevallo, Shorter University and Young Harris College joined the GLVC as associate members in men's lacrosse for spring 2018.
  - Wisconsin–Parkside left the GLVC at the end of the 2017–18 academic year, and began competing in the GLIAC in fall 2018.
  - Ouachita Baptist University joined the GLVC as an associate member in men's wrestling in fall 2018.
- 2019:
  - Shorter University ended its associate membership in men's lacrosse at the end of the 2018–19 academic year.
  - Southwest Baptist began GLVC competition as a full member in fall 2019, after five seasons as an associate member in football (2014 through 2018).
  - Lindenwood University began GLVC competition in fall 2019.
  - Lincoln ended its associate membership in football after five seasons of competition (2014 through 2018) but rejoined as an associate member in women's bowling for 2019–20.
  - America's Crossroads Bowl established.
  - The University of Central Missouri and Upper Iowa University joined the GLVC as associate members in women's bowling for 2019–20.
- 2020:
  - Lander University joined the GLVC as an associate member in men's lacrosse for spring 2020.
  - In March, the COVID-19 pandemic forced suspension of competition for the remainder of the 2019–20 academic year. For the 2020–21 academic year, the GLVC held its fall 2020 conference sport competitions in spring 2021.
  - Bellarmine left the GLVC at the end of the 2019–20 academic year, and joined NCAA Division I as a member of the ASUN in fall 2020.
  - Five associate members left the GLVC: Alabama–Huntsville, Montevallo, Lander and Young Harris in men's lacrosse, and Lincoln in women's bowling, all at the end of the 2019–20 academic year.
  - Davenport University joined the GLVC as an associate member in men's wrestling (fall 2020) and men's lacrosse (spring 2021).
- 2021: Missouri Western State University joined the GLVC as an associate member in women's lacrosse for spring 2021.
- 2022: Southern Indiana and Lindenwood left the GLVC at the end of the 2021–22 academic year, and joined NCAA Division I as members of the OVC in fall 2022.
- 2023:
  - Core sports requirement revised.
  - Newman University joined the GLVC as an associate member in women's bowling for spring 2023.
  - Ouachita Baptist ended its associate membership in men's wrestling at the end of the 2022–23 academic year.
  - Upper Iowa began GLVC competition as a full member in fall 2023, after four seasons as an associate member in women's bowling (2019-20 through 2022–23).
- 2024:
  - Davenport ended its associate memberships in men's wrestling and men's lacrosse at the end of the 2023–24 academic year.
  - Lincoln began GLVC competition as a full member in fall 2024.
- 2025:
  - Oklahoma Christian University joined the GLVC as an associate member in women's bowling for spring 2025.
  - The GLVC began sponsoring women's wrestling in the 2025–26 winter season, with Davenport, Grand Valley State University, and Northern Michigan University as associate members.
- 2026:
  - The GLVC began sponsoring men's volleyball in the 2026 spring season, with Roosevelt University, Thomas More University, and the University of Jamestown as associate members. Thomas More dropped men's volleyball at the end of that season.
  - The GLVC also began sponsoring STUNT in the 2026 spring season, with Ferris State University, Purdue University Northwest, and Trevecca Nazarene University as associate members.
  - Grand Valley State will join as a men's wrestling affiliate starting in the 2026–27 season.
- 2027:
  - Indianapolis will leave the GLVC at the end of the 2026–27 academic year, to become a member of the G-MAC

== Member schools ==
=== Current members ===
The GLVC currently has 15 full members, including ten private and five public institutions. Indianapolis is leaving the conference after the 2026–27 academic year.

Institution	Location	Founded	Affiliation	Enrollment (Note: Most recent full-time undergraduate enrollment (Fall 2023) as reported in the Equity in Athletics Database, available at https://ope.ed.gov/athletics/#/.)	Nickname	Joined (Note: Represents the calendar year when fall sports competition begins.)	Colors
Drury University	Springfield, Missouri	1873	UCC & DOC	1,590	Panthers	2005	
University of Illinois Springfield	Springfield, Illinois	1969	Public	4,367	Prairie Stars	2008 (Note: Illinois–Springfield (UIS) joined the GLVC in 2008 but did not begin competition until the 2009–10 academic year.)	
University of Indianapolis	Indianapolis, Indiana	1902	United Methodist	5,638	Greyhounds	1978	
Lewis University	Romeoville, Illinois	1932	Catholic	7,011	Flyers	1980	
Lincoln University	Jefferson City, Missouri	1866	Public (HBCU)	1,799	Blue Tigers	2023 (Note: Lincoln joined the GLVC in 2023 and began competition as a full member in the 2024-25 academic year, after having been an associate member in football (2014 through 2018 fall seasons) and women's bowling (2019-20).)	
Maryville University	Town and Country, Missouri (Note: Mailing address is St. Louis.)	1872	Catholic	8,811	Saints	2008 (Note: Maryville joined the GLVC in 2008 but did not begin competition until the 2009–10 academic year.)	
McKendree University	Lebanon, Illinois	1828	United Methodist	1,960	Bearcats	2010 (Note: McKendree joined the GLVC in 2010 but did not begin competition until the 2012–13 academic year.)	
Missouri University of Science and Technology (Missouri S&T)	Rolla, Missouri	1870	Public	6,456	Miners	2005	
University of Missouri–St. Louis	St. Louis, Missouri	1963	Public	8,023	Tritons	1995 (Note: UMSL joined the GLVC in 1995 but did not begin competition until the 1996–97 academic year.)	
Quincy University	Quincy, Illinois	1860	Catholic	1,163	Hawks	1994 (Note: Quincy joined the GLVC in 1994 but did not begin competition until the 1995–96 academic year.)	
Rockhurst University	Kansas City, Missouri	1910	Catholic	1,964	Hawks	2005	
Southwest Baptist University	Bolivar, Missouri	1878	Baptist	2,168	Bearcats	2019 (Note: Southwest Baptist joined the GLVC in 2019 and began competition as a full member in the 2019–20 academic year, after five seasons as an associate member for football (2014 through 2018 fall seasons).)	
Truman State University	Kirksville, Missouri	1867	Public	3,636	Bulldogs	2012 (Note: Truman State joined the GLVC in 2012 but did not begin competition until the 2013–14 academic year.)	
Upper Iowa University	Fayette, Iowa	1857	Nonsectarian	3,102	Peacocks	2022 (Note: Upper Iowa joined the GLVC in 2022 and began competition as a full member in the 2023-24 academic year, after four seasons as an associate member for women's bowling (2019-20 through 2022-23).)	
William Jewell College	Liberty, Missouri	1849	Nonsectarian	853	Cardinals	2009 (Note: William Jewell joined the GLVC in 2009 but did not begin competition until the 2011–12 academic year.)	

=== Associate members ===
The GLVC currently has 12 associate members, including six private and six public institutions. Years listed in this table are calendar years. For schools that play only spring sports (such as women's lacrosse) in the GLVC, the calendar year of arrival precedes the first season of competition.

Institution	Location	Founded	Affiliation	Undergrad Enrollment (Note: Most recent full-time undergraduate enrollment (Fall 2023) as reported in the Equity in Athletics Database, available at https://ope.ed.gov/athletics/#/.)	Nickname	Joined (Note: Represents the calendar year when fall sports competition begins.)	Colors	GLVC sport(s)	Primary conference
University of Central Missouri	Warrensburg, Missouri	1871	Public	4,879	Jennies (Note: Central Missouri uses two nicknames: Mules for men's sports teams and Jennies for women's sports teams.)	2019		Women's bowling	Mid-America (MIAA)
Davenport University	Grand Rapids, Michigan	1866	Nonsectarian	1,923	Panthers	2025 (Note: Davenport previously had associate member status from 2020 to 2024, in men's wrestling and men's lacrosse.)		Women's wrestling	Great Lakes (GLIAC)
Ferris State University	Big Rapids, Michigan	1884	Public	6,532	Bulldogs	2025		STUNT	Great Lakes (GLIAC)
Grand Valley State University	Allendale, Michigan	1960	Public	17,207	Lakers	2025		Women's wrestling	Great Lakes (GLIAC)
Grand Valley State University	Allendale, Michigan	1960	Public	17,207	Lakers	2026		Men's wrestling	Great Lakes (GLIAC)
University of Jamestown	Jamestown, North Dakota	1883	Presbyterian (PCUSA)	898	Jimmies	2025		Men's volleyball	Northern Sun (NSIC)
Missouri Western State University	St. Joseph, Missouri	1915	Public	2,097	Griffons	2020		Women's lacrosse	Mid-America (MIAA)
Newman University	Wichita, Kansas	1933	Catholic	818	Jets	2022		Women's bowling	Mid-America (MIAA)
Northern Michigan University	Marquette, Michigan	1899	Public	5,593	Wildcats	2025		Women's wrestling	Great Lakes (GLIAC)
Oklahoma Christian University	Oklahoma City, Oklahoma	1950	Churches of Christ	1,711	Lady Eagles (Note: Oklahoma Christian uses two nicknames: Eagles for men's sports teams and Lady Eagles for women's sports teams.)	2024		Women's bowling	Lone Star (LSC)
Purdue University Northwest	Hammond and Westville, Indiana (Note: Purdue Northwest maintains a branch campus in Westville, where the men's and women's cross country teams are housed and where the men's and women's basketball & women's volleyball teams play a portion of their home contests; the other intercollegiate athletics teams compete on the main campus in Hammond.)	1946 (Note: Purdue Northwest was originally founded as two separate institutions: Purdue University–Calumet in Hammond and Purdue University–North Central in Westville, which both began offering degrees in 1946. The two institutions were merged to become Purdue Northwest in 2016.)	Public	4,622	Lions	2025		STUNT	Great Lakes (GLIAC)
Roosevelt University	Chicago, Illinois	1945	Nonsectarian	2,300	Lakers	2025		Men's volleyball	Great Lakes (GLIAC)
Trevecca Nazarene University	Nashville, Tennessee	1901	Church of the Nazarene	1,328	Trojans	2025		STUNT	Gulf South (GSC)

=== Former members ===
Former members of the GLVC include six public and five private institutions:

Institution	Location	Founded	Affiliation	Undergrad Enrollment (Note: Most recent full-time undergraduate enrollment (Fall 2023) as reported in the Equity in Athletics Database, available at https://ope.ed.gov/athletics/#/.)	Nickname	Joined (Note: Represents the calendar year when fall sports competition begins.)	Left (Note: Represents the calendar year when spring sports competition ends.)	Current conference
Ashland University	Ashland, Ohio	1878	Brethren	1,886	Eagles	1978	1994 (Note: Ashland and Kentucky State announced their departure from the GLVC in 1994 but fulfilled their commitments to a final year of competition in the GLVC during the 1994–95 academic year.)	Great Midwest (G-MAC)
Bellarmine University	Louisville, Kentucky	1950	Catholic	2,219	Knights	1978	2020	Atlantic Sun (ASUN) (Note: Currently an NCAA Division I athletic conference.)
Indiana University–Purdue University Fort Wayne (Note: On July 1, 2018, Indiana University and Purdue University dissolved their joint Fort Wayne campus. IU took over IPFW's health sciences programs under the name of Indiana University Fort Wayne, and the remaining IPFW academic programs formed Purdue University Fort Wayne (PFW). The IPFW athletic program was inherited by PFW, with the athletic branding changed to Purdue Fort Wayne.)	Fort Wayne, Indiana	1964	Public	4,596	Mastodons	1984	2001	Horizon
Kentucky State University	Frankfort, Kentucky	1886	Public (HBCU)	1,185	Thorobreds & Thorobrettes	1989	1994	Southern (SIAC)
Kentucky Wesleyan College	Owensboro, Kentucky	1858	United; Methodist	772	Panthers	1978	2013 (Note: Kentucky Wesleyan competed in the GLVC as a football-only associate member in fall 2013.)	Great Midwest (G-MAC)
Lindenwood University	St. Charles, Missouri	1827	Presbyterian	4,048	Lions	2019	2022	Ohio Valley (OVC)
Northern Kentucky University	Highland Heights, Kentucky	1968	Public	6,703	Norse	1985	2012	Horizon
Saint Joseph's College	Rensselaer, Indiana	1889	Catholic	N/A	Pumas	1978	2017	Closed in 2017
Southern Illinois University Edwardsville	Edwardsville, Illinois	1957	Public	7,505	Cougars	1994 (Note: Southern Illinois–Edwardsville (SIUE) joined the GLVC in 1994 but did not begin competition until the 1995–96 academic year.)	2008	Ohio Valley (OVC)
University of Southern Indiana	Evansville, Indiana	1965	Public	4,748	Screaming; Eagles	1978	2022	Ohio Valley (OVC)
University of Wisconsin–Parkside (Note: Wisconsin-Parkside now brands its athletic program as "Parkside".)	Somers, Wisconsin	1968	Public	2,442	Rangers	1994 (Note: Wisconsin-Parkside joined the GLVC in 1994 but did not begin competition until the 1995–96 academic year.)	2018	Great Lakes (GLIAC)

=== Former associate members ===
Former associate members of the GLVC include four public and five private institutions. Years listed in this table reflect calendar years. For fall sports, the calendar year of departure is the year after the last season of competition. For spring sports, the calendar year of arrival precedes the first season of competition. (NOTE: This list does not include the former associate members—Southwest Baptist, Upper Iowa, and Lincoln—that eventually became full members; the former full member—Kentucky Wesleyan—that became an associate member; or Davenport, a former GLVC associate in two sports that rejoined the conference in a third sport.)

Institution	Location	Founded	Affiliation	Undergrad Enrollment (Note: Most recent full-time undergraduate enrollment (Fall 2023) as reported in the Equity in Athletics Database, available at https://ope.ed.gov/athletics/#/.)	Nickname	Joined (Note: Represents the calendar year when fall sports competition begins.)	Left (Note: Represents the calendar year when spring sports competition ends.)	GLVC sport(s)	Primary conference as assoc.	Current conference
University of Alabama in Huntsville	Huntsville, Alabama	1969	Public	5,642	Chargers	2017	2020	men's lacrosse	Gulf South (GSC)	
Central State University	Wilberforce, Ohio	1887	Public	2,408	Marauders	2012	2013	football	Great Midwest (G-MAC)	Southern; Intercollegiate (SIAC)
Lander University	Greenwood, South Carolina	1872	Public	3,213	Bearcats	2019	2020	men's lacrosse	Peach Belt (PBC)	
University of Montevallo	Montevallo, Alabama	1896	Public	1,935	Falcons	2017	2020	men's lacrosse	Gulf South (GSC)	
Ouachita Baptist University	Arkadelphia, Arkansas	1886	Baptist	1,585	Tigers	2018	2023	men's wrestling	Great American (GAC)	
Shorter University	Rome, Georgia	1873	Baptist	1.023	Hawks	2017	2019	men's lacrosse	Gulf South (GSC)	Carolinas (CC)
Thomas More University	Crestview Hills, Kentucky	1921	Catholic	1,236	Saints	2025	2026	Men's volleyball	Great Midwest (G-MAC)	
Urbana University	Urbana, Ohio	1850	Nonsectarian	N/A	Blue Knights	2012	2013	football	Great Midwest (G-MAC)	Closed in 2020
Young Harris College	Young Harris, Georgia	1886	United Methodist	807	Mountain Lions	2017	2020	men's lacrosse	Peach Belt (PBC)	Carolinas (CC)

=== Membership timeline ===
Full member (all sports) Full member (non-football) Associate member (football) Associate member (other sport)

== Sports sponsorship ==
=== Conference sports ===
The seven sports indicated with a green background were designated "core sports" and required of all full members from 2005 to 2023. Effective fall 2023, all full members are required to sponsor men's and women's basketball, men's and women's soccer, four additional men's sports, and four additional women's sports.

Sport	Men's	Women's
Baseball	✓	
Basketball	✓	✓
Bowling		✓
Cross Country	✓	✓
Football	✓	
Golf	✓	✓
Lacrosse	✓	✓
Soccer	✓	✓
Softball		✓
STUNT		✓
Swimming & Diving	✓	✓
Tennis	✓	✓
Track & Field Indoor	✓	✓
Track & Field Outdoor	✓	✓
Volleyball	✓	✓
Wrestling	✓	✓

=== Men's conference sports, by school ===
Departing members in pink.

School	Baseball	Basketball	Cross Country	Football	Golf	Lacrosse	Soccer	Swimming & Diving	Tennis	Track & Field Indoor	Track & Field Outdoor	Volleyball (Note: De facto Division I sport. The NCAA's top-level men's volleyball championship is open to members of Divisions I and II.)	Wrestling	Total GLVC Sports
Drury	✓	✓	✓		✓		✓	✓	✓	✓	✓		✓	10
Illinois–Springfield	✓	✓	✓		✓		✓		✓	✓	✓			8
Indianapolis	✓	✓	✓	✓	✓	✓	✓	✓	✓	✓	✓		✓	12
Lewis	✓	✓	✓		✓	✓	✓	✓		✓	✓	(Note: Lewis and McKendree continue to house men's volleyball in the Midwestern Intercollegiate Volleyball Association.)		9
Lincoln	✓	✓		✓	✓		✓			✓	✓			7
Maryville	✓	✓	✓		✓	✓	✓	✓	✓	✓	✓	✓	✓	12
McKendree	✓	✓	✓	✓	✓		✓	✓	✓	✓	✓		✓	11
Missouri S&T	✓	✓	✓	✓	✓		✓	✓		✓	✓	✓		10
Missouri–St. Louis	✓	✓	✓		✓		✓	✓	✓	✓	✓			9
Quincy	✓	✓	✓	✓ (Note: In addition to its full-sized football team, Quincy plays sprint football, a weight-restricted version otherwise played under standard college rules, in the Midwest Sprint Football League.)	✓	✓	✓	✓	✓	✓	✓	✓	✓	13
Rockhurst	✓	✓	✓		✓	✓	✓	✓	✓	✓	✓	✓		11
Southwest Baptist	✓	✓	✓	✓			✓	✓	✓	✓	✓	✓		10
Truman	✓	✓	✓	✓			✓	✓		✓	✓			8
Upper Iowa	✓	✓		✓	✓		✓						✓	6
William Jewell	✓	✓	✓	✓	✓	✓	✓	✓		✓	✓			10
Associate Members
Jamestown												✓		1
Roosevelt												✓		1
Grand Valley State													✓	1
Totals	15	15	13	9	13	6	15	12	9	14	14	7	7	149

=== Women's conference sports, by school ===
School	Basketball	Bowling (Note: De facto Division I sport through 2026–27, with a single NCAA championship open to members of all divisions. A dedicated Division II championship will be introduced in 2027–28.)	Cross Country	Golf	Lacrosse	Soccer	Softball	STUNT (Note: Graduated from the NCAA Emerging Sports for Women program to full championship status in January 2026, with the first official championship to be held in 2026–27. At that time, it will be a de facto Division I sport, with a single championship open to members of all divisions.)	Swimming & Diving	Tennis	Track & Field Indoor	Track & Field Outdoor	Volleyball	Wrestling (Note: De facto Division I sport. The current NCAA championship is open to members of all divisions. The sport's de facto D-I status will not be affected by the establishment of a Division III championship in 2027–28.)	Total GLVC Sports
Drury	✓		✓	✓		✓	✓	✓	✓	✓	✓	✓	✓		11
Illinois–Springfield	✓		✓	✓		✓	✓			✓	✓	✓	✓		9
Indianapolis	✓	✓	✓	✓	✓	✓	✓		✓	✓	✓	✓	✓		12
Lewis	✓	✓	✓	✓	✓	✓	✓	✓	✓		✓	✓	✓		12
Lincoln	✓		✓	✓		✓	✓				✓	✓			7
Maryville	✓	✓	✓	✓	✓	✓	✓	✓	✓	✓	✓	✓	✓		13
McKendree	✓	✓	✓	✓	✓	✓	✓		✓	✓	✓	✓	✓	✓	13
Missouri S&T	✓		✓			✓	✓				✓	✓	✓		7
Missouri–St. Louis	✓		✓	✓		✓	✓		✓	✓	✓	✓	✓		10
Quincy	✓	✓	✓	✓	✓	✓	✓	✓	✓	✓	✓	✓	✓	✓	14
Rockhurst	✓		✓	✓	✓	✓	✓		✓	✓	✓	✓	✓		11
Southwest Baptist	✓		✓			✓	✓	✓	✓	✓	✓	✓	✓		10
Truman	✓		✓	✓		✓	✓		✓	✓	✓	✓	✓		10
Upper Iowa	✓		✓	✓		✓	✓				✓	✓	✓	✓	9
William Jewell	✓		✓	✓	✓	✓	✓		✓		✓	✓	✓	✓	11
Associate Members
Central Missouri		✓													1
Davenport														✓	1
Ferris State								✓							1
Grand Valley State														✓	1
Missouri Western					✓										1
Newman		✓													1
Northern Michigan														✓	1
Oklahoma Christian		✓													1
Purdue Northwest								✓							1
Trevecca Nazarene								✓							1
Totals	15	8	15	13	8	15	15	8	11	10	15	15	14	7	169

=== Non-conference NCAA sports, by school ===
School	Men	Women		
School	Water Polo (Note: De facto Division I sport. For the sports of men's and women's water polo and beach volleyball, the NCAA conducts a single national championship open to members of Divisions I, II, and III.)	Field Hockey	Water Polo	Beach Volleyball
Maryville		Independent		
McKendree	WWPA		WWPA	Independent
Southwest Baptist				Independent

=== NCAA emerging sports for women ===
Emerging sports are not yet sponsored by enough NCAA members nationwide to be added to the official list of championship sports.

Drury and Indianapolis both sponsor triathlon, which has had the status of an emerging sport since 2014.

Lewis sponsors flag football, which has had the status of an emerging sport since January 2026.

STUNT, an emerging sport from 2023 to January 2026, became a GLVC sport in 2025–26 and an official NCAA championship sport in 2026–27.

No full GLVC member currently sponsors the remaining emerging sports, equestrian and rugby. Also, no full member sponsors acrobatics & tumbling, which graduated from the Emerging Sports program alongside STUNT, to become an official NCAA championship sport in 2026–27.

=== Non-NCAA varsity sports ===
Some GLVC members give varsity status to teams in non-NCAA sports and to other club teams, such as men's bowling (because the NCAA governs only the women's sport). Other examples are sprint football, a weight-restricted variant of American football, sponsored by Quincy, and the men's and women's ice hockey teams of McKendree and Maryville, which compete at the club level in the American Collegiate Hockey Association (ACHA)—though Maryville will elevate its men's team to full NCAA Division I status in 2027–28. While some GLVC members administer their club sports through their athletics departments, others operate their club sports as student organizations outside of athletics.

== Conference facilities ==
School	Football		Basketball	
School	Stadium	Capacity	Arena	Capacity
Drury	non-football school		O'Reilly Family Events Center	2,850
Illinois–Springfield	non-football school		The Recreation and Athletic Center	3,000
Indianapolis	Key Stadium	5,500	Nicoson Hall	4,000
Lewis	non-football school		Neil Carey Arena	1,100
Lincoln	Dwight T. Reed Stadium	3,000	Jason Gymnasium	2,000
Maryville	non-football school		Moloney Arena at Simon Athletic Center	2,000
McKendree	Leemon Field	2,000	Melvin Price Convocation Center	1,600
Missouri S&T	Allgood–Bailey Stadium	8,000	Gibson Arena	4,000
Missouri–St. Louis	non-football school		Mark Twain Center	4,736
Quincy	QU Stadium	2,500	Pepsi Arena	2,000
Rockhurst	non-football school		Mason-Halpin Field House	1,500
Southwest Baptist	Plaster Stadium	3,000	John Q. Hammons Court	2,925
Truman	James S. Stokes Stadium	4,000	John J. Pershing Arena	2,300
Upper Iowa	Harms-Eischeid Stadium	3,500	Dorman Gymnasium	1,950
William Jewell	Greene Stadium	7,000	Mabee Center	2,400

== National champions ==
Since the founding of the conference, members of the GLVC have won 35 NCAA Division II national championships and three NCAA National Collegiate championships (indicated in green). "National Collegiate" is the NCAA's official term to describe championship events open to members of more than one NCAA division.

Year	Sport	School
1987	Men's basketball	Kentucky Wesleyan
1990	Men's basketball	Kentucky Wesleyan
1995	Men's basketball	Southern Indiana
1999	Men's basketball	Kentucky Wesleyan
2000	Women's basketball	Northern Kentucky
2001	Men's basketball	Kentucky Wesleyan
2005	Men's swimming & diving	Drury
2006	Men's swimming & diving	Drury
2007	Men's swimming & diving	Drury
2007	Women's swimming & diving	Drury
2007	Softball	SIU Edwardsville
2008	Women's basketball	Northern Kentucky
2008	Men's swimming & diving	Drury
2009	Men's swimming & diving	Drury
2009	Women's swimming & diving	Drury
2010	Men's swimming & diving	Drury
2010	Women's swimming & diving	Drury
2010	Baseball	Southern Indiana
2010	Men's soccer	Northern Kentucky
2011	Men's basketball	Bellarmine
2011	Men's swimming & diving	Drury
2011	Women's swimming & diving	Drury
2012	Men's swimming & diving	Drury
2013	Men's basketball	Drury
2013	Men's swimming & diving	Drury
2014	Men's swimming & diving	Drury
2014	Baseball	Southern Indiana
2015	Women's golf	Indianapolis
2017	Bowling	McKendree
2018	Women's golf	Indianapolis
2018	Softball	Southern Indiana
2021	Women's lacrosse	Lindenwood
2022	Bowling	McKendree
2022	Women's lacrosse	Indianapolis
2023	Men's swimming & diving	Indianapolis
2024	Women's golf	Indianapolis
2025	Men's swimming & diving	Drury @
2026	Women's wrestling	McKendree

@ vacated

== See also ==
- Great Lakes Valley Conference men's basketball tournament
- Great Lakes Valley Conference women's basketball tournament
- List of Great Lakes Valley Conference football standings
