= Florence Magruder Gilmore =

- Born: February 13, 1881; Columbus, Ohio, U.S.
- Died: September 13, 1945 (aged 64); Columbus, Ohio
- Education: Maryville College
- Writing career
- Pen name: Florence Gilmore
- Language: English; French
- Genres: periodical literature; novels; short stories; poetry; translations

Florence Magruder Gilmore (pen name, Florence Gilmore; February 13, 1881 – September 13, 1945) was an American author and settlement worker. She was a frequent contributor to the Catholic press, and wrote several novels.

== Personal life and education ==
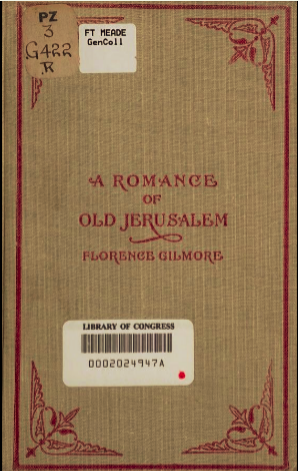
A romance of old Jerusalem, 1911

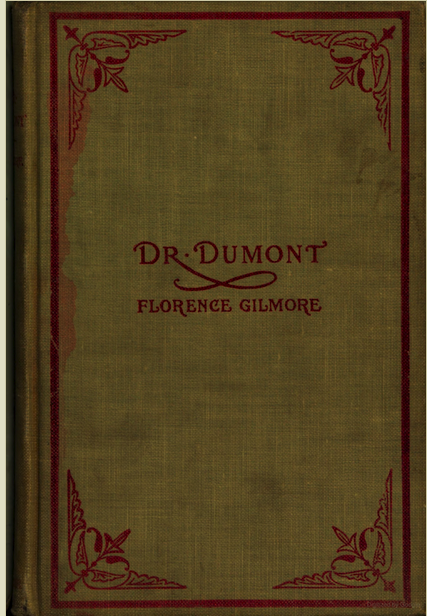
Dr. Dumont, 1911

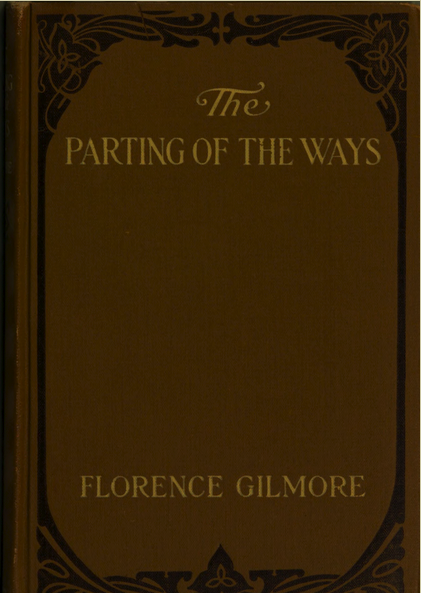
The Parting of the Ways, 1914

Florence Magruder Gilmore was born in Columbus, Ohio on February 13, 1881. Her father, James Gillespie Gilmore (1854–1904), was a senior member of the firm of Gilmore & Ruhl, St. Louis, Missouri. Through her father, she was connected with the prominent families of Blaine, Ewing and Sherman, in the U.S. Her mother was Florence (Magruder) Gilmore; through her mother, she was connected with some of the well-known families of Scotland, including Clan MacGregor.

Her siblings were a brother, Edward M. Gilmore, and two sisters, both Catholic nuns, Reverend Mother Mary Gilmore, superior at Villa Duchesne, and Mother Frances Gilmore of the Academy of the Sacred Heart.

Gilmore attended Sacred Heart Convent school, Omaha, Nebraska, and Maryville College (now Maryville University), St. Louis, Missouri. In 1936, Gilmore received an Honorary B.Litt. from Maryville College.

== Career ==
Gilmore was engaged in doing settlement work under Catholic organizations in St. Louis.

She was a member of the staff of The Catholic Columbian (weekly), and a contributor to many periodicals, Catholic and non-sectarian. These included America, Extension, Benzinger's, Messenger of the Sacred Heart, Rosary, Leader , Ave Maria, St. Anthony Messenger, The Sign, The Missionary, Catholic World , and Atlantic Monthly.

Gilmore published at least three novels with B. Herder of St. Louis, A Romance of Old Jerusalem (1911), Dr. Dumont (1911), and The Parting of the Ways (1914). In The Parting of the Ways, Gilmore tells the story of two youths whose association was interrupted by the different educational plans of their parents. The one receives a Catholic education, and his faith is the center of his life. The other attends secular schools, and his faith drops into the position of an accident. The story is allowed to point its moral by the simple unfolding of the plot without any offensive insistence.

There were several translations from French for Maryknoll, such as For the Faith, Martyr of Futuna, and Two Vincentian martyrs. Her poetry was included in the American Book of Verse.

== Death ==
After a major operation, Florence Magruder Gilmore died in Columbus, Ohio, September 13, 1945.

== Selected works ==
=== Novels ===
- A Romance of Old Jerusalem, 1911
- Dr. Dumont, 1911
- The Parting of the Ways, 1914

=== Short story collections ===
- Cowboy Or Priest: And Fourteen Other Stories, 1922

=== Adapted from the French ===
- For the Faith: Life of Just de Brentenières, by Camille Appert, 1918
- The Martyr of Futuna. Blessed Peter Chanel of the Society of Mary, 1918
- Two Vincentian martyrs, 1925
