= Ray Reed (Missouri politician) =

American politician

Member of the Missouri House of Representatives from the 83rd district
- Incumbent
- Assumed office January 8, 2025
- Preceded by: Sarah Unsicker

Personal details
- Born: St. Louis, Missouri, U.S.
- Party: Democratic
- Education: University of Central Missouri
- Website: www.rayreedmo.com

Raymond Reed is an American politician who was elected member of the Missouri House of Representatives for the 83rd district in 2024. His district is based in the St. Louis area and contains Brentwood, Maplewood, Richmond Heights, Shrewsbury and parts of Affton.
