= List of Great Lakes Valley Conference football standings =

This is a list of yearly Great Lakes Valley Conference football standings.

== Great Lakes Valley standings ==
2012 Great Lakes Valley Conference football standings
	Conf.			Overall
Team	W		L	W		L
No. 15 Indianapolis $^	8	–	0	10	–	3
No. 24 Missouri S&T	7	–	1	10	–	1
Urbana	5	–	3	7	–	4
Saint Joseph's (IN)	5	–	3	6	–	5
Quincy	4	–	4	4	–	7
McKendree #	3	–	5	3	–	7
William Jewell	2	–	6	3	–	8
Central State	2	–	6	2	–	9
Kentucky Wesleyan	0	–	8	2	–	9
$ – Conference champion; ^ – NCAA Division II playoff participant; # – Provisional Division II member; Rankings from AFCA Poll

2013 Great Lakes Valley Conference football standings
	Conf.			Overall
Team	W		L	W		L
No. 18 Indianapolis $^	7	–	0	10	–	2
Saint Joseph's (IN)	5	–	2	8	–	3
Truman State	5	–	2	7	–	4
Missouri S&T	5	–	2	6	–	5
McKendree	3	–	4	4	–	6
William Jewell	2	–	5	3	–	8
Quincy	1	–	6	2	–	9
Kentucky Wesleyan	0	–	7	0	–	11
$ – Conference champion; ^ – NCAA Division II playoff participant; Rankings from AFCA Poll

2014 Great Lakes Valley Conference football standings
	Conf.			Overall
Team	W		L	W		L
Indianapolis $	7	–	1	9	–	2
Saint Joseph's (IN)	5	–	3	8	–	3
Truman State	5	–	3	6	–	4
McKendree	5	–	3	5	–	6
William Jewell	5	–	3	5	–	6
Quincy	4	–	4	6	–	5
Missouri S&T	3	–	5	4	–	7
Southwest Baptist	1	–	7	4	–	7
Lincoln (MO)	1	–	7	2	–	9
$ – Conference champion; Rankings from AFCA Poll

2015 Great Lakes Valley Conference football standings
	Conf.			Overall
Team	W		L	W		L
No. 18 Indianapolis $^	8	–	0	10	–	2
McKendree	6	–	2	8	–	2
Missouri S&T	5	–	3	5	–	5
Truman State	4	–	4	5	–	6
William Jewell	4	–	4	4	–	7
Saint Joseph's (IN)	3	–	5	4	–	6
Southwest Baptist	3	–	5	4	–	6
Quincy	3	–	5	3	–	7
Lincoln (MO)	0	–	8	1	–	10
$ – Conference champion; ^ – NCAA Division II playoff participant; Rankings from AFCA Poll

2016 Great Lakes Valley Conference football standings
	Conf.			Overall
Team	W		L	W		L
No. 22 Southwest Baptist +^	7	–	1	10	–	2
Truman State +	7	–	1	8	–	3
McKendree	6	–	2	8	–	3
Indianapolis	5	–	3	6	–	5
Missouri S&T	4	–	4	5	–	6
Quincy	3	–	5	5	–	6
Saint Joseph's (IN)	3	–	5	5	–	6
William Jewell	1	–	7	1	–	9
Lincoln (MO)	0	–	8	2	–	9
+ – Conference co-champions; ^ – NCAA Division II playoff participant; Rankings from AFCA Poll

2017 Great Lakes Valley Conference football standings
	Conf.			Overall
Team	W		L	W		L
No. 13 Indianapolis $^	7	–	0	11	–	1
McKendree	5	–	2	7	–	4
Missouri S&T	5	–	2	7	–	4
Southwest Baptist	4	–	3	5	–	5
Truman State	4	–	3	5	–	6
William Jewell	2	–	5	2	–	9
Quincy	1	–	6	3	–	8
Lincoln (MO)	0	–	7	1	–	9
$ – Conference champion; ^ – NCAA Division II playoff participant; Rankings from AFCA Poll

2018 Great Lakes Valley Conference football standings
	Conf.			Overall
Team	W		L	W		L
No. 11 Indianapolis $^	7	–	0	10	–	2
Missouri S&T #	6	–	1	10	–	2
Truman State	5	–	2	6	–	5
McKendree	4	–	3	6	–	5
Quincy	3	–	4	4	–	7
Lincoln (MO)	2	–	5	3	–	8
William Jewell	1	–	6	1	–	9
Southwest Baptist	0	–	7	0	–	10
$ – Conference champion; ^ – NCAA Division II playoff participant; # – Mineral Water Bowl participant; Rankings from AFCA Poll

2019 Great Lakes Valley Conference football standings
	Conf.			Overall
Team	W		L	W		L
No. 25 Lindenwood $^	7	–	0	9	–	4
No. 17 Indianapolis ^	6	–	1	9	–	2
Truman State #	5	–	2	10	–	2
Missouri S&T	4	–	3	7	–	4
McKendree	3	–	4	5	–	6
Quincy	2	–	5	5	–	6
Southwest Baptist	1	–	6	3	–	8
William Jewell	0	–	7	1	–	10
$ – Conference champion; ^ – NCAA Division II playoff participant; # – America's Crossroads Bowl participant; Rankings from AFCA Poll

2020 Great Lakes Valley Conference football standings
	Conf.			Overall
Team	W		L	W		L
East
Indianapolis y$	2	–	0	3	–	0
McKendree	1	–	1	1	–	1
Quincy	0	–	2	0	–	2
Lindenwood	0	–	0	0	–	0
West
Truman State y	3	–	0	3	–	1
Missouri S&T	2	–	1	2	–	1
Southwest Baptist	1	–	2	1	–	2
William Jewell	0	–	3	0	–	3
Championship: Indianapolis 46, Truman State 29
$ – Conference champion; y – Championship game participant; Note: Season played in spring 2021. Lindenwood opted not to participate.

2021 Great Lakes Valley Conference football standings
	Conf.			Overall
Team	W		L	W		L
Lindenwood $^	7	–	0	9	–	3
Indianapolis	5	–	2	7	–	4
Truman State #	4	–	3	9	–	3
Missouri S&T	4	–	3	6	–	5
McKendree	3	–	4	4	–	7
Southwest Baptist	3	–	4	4	–	7
Quincy	2	–	5	4	–	7
William Jewell	0	–	7	0	–	11
$ – Conference champion; ^ – NCAA Division II playoff participant; # – America's Crossroads Bowl participant; Rankings from AFCA Poll

2022 Great Lakes Valley Conference football standings
	Conf.			Overall
Team	W		L	W		L
No. 17 Indianapolis $^	6	–	0	9	–	2
No. 25 Truman State #	5	–	1	9	–	2
Southwest Baptist	4	–	2	6	–	5
McKendree	2	–	4	5	–	6
Missouri S&T	2	–	4	3	–	7
Quincy	1	–	5	4	–	7
William Jewell	1	–	5	2	–	9
$ – Conference champion; ^ – NCAA Division II playoff participant; # – America's Crossroads Bowl participant; Rankings from AFCA Poll

2023 Great Lakes Valley Conference football standings
	Conf.			Overall
Team	W		L	W		L
No. 22 Indianapolis $^	6	–	1	9	–	2
Truman State	5	–	2	9	–	2
McKendree #	5	–	2	5	–	6
Missouri S&T	4	–	3	4	–	7
Quincy	3	–	4	6	–	5
Southwest Baptist	3	–	4	4	–	7
Upper Iowa	1	–	6	3	–	8
William Jewell	1	–	6	2	–	8
$ – Conference champion; ^ – NCAA Division II playoff participant; # – America's Crossroads Bowl participant; Rankings from AFCA Poll

2024 Great Lakes Valley Conference football standings
	Conf.			Overall
Team	W		L	W		L
No. 19 Indianapolis $^	8	–	0	10	–	2
Truman State #	6	–	2	8	–	4
Upper Iowa	6	–	2	7	–	4
Quincy	5	–	3	5	–	4
McKendree	4	–	4	5	–	6
Missouri S&T	3	–	5	4	–	7
William Jewell	3	–	5	5	–	6
Southwest Baptist	1	–	7	2	–	8
Lincoln (MO)	0	–	8	1	–	10
$ – Conference champion; ^ – NCAA Division II playoff participant; # – America's Crossroads Bowl participant; Rankings from AFCA poll

2025 Great Lakes Valley Conference football standings
	Conf.			Overall
Team	W		L	W		L
No. 10 Indianapolis $^	8	–	0	11	–	2
Truman ^	7	–	1	8	–	4
Upper Iowa #	6	–	2	9	–	3
Missouri S&T	4	–	4	6	–	5
Quincy	4	–	4	6	–	5
McKendree	4	–	4	4	–	7
Southwest Baptist	2	–	6	3	–	7
William Jewell	1	–	7	3	–	8
Lincoln (MO)	0	–	8	2	–	9
$ – Conference champion; ^ – NCAA Division II playoff participant; # - Albanese Candy Bowl participant; Rankings from AFCA poll
