= Maryville University =

Private university located in Town and Country, Missouri, U.S.

Maryville University of St. Louis
- Former names: Maryville Academy of the Sacred Heart (1872–1923); Maryville College of the Sacred Heart (1923–1991)
- Motto: "Omnium rerum praestantia excellentes"
- Type: Private university
- Established: April 6, 1872; 154 years ago
- Religious affiliation: Society of the Sacred Heart (Catholic Church)
- Endowment: $89.1 million (2025)
- President: Dan Shipp
- Students: 8,811 (Fall 2025)
- Undergraduates: 5,274 (Fall 2025)
- Postgraduates: 3,537 (Fall 2025)
- Location: Town and Country, Missouri, United States; 38.6459°N 90.5038°W
- Campus: Suburban
- Colors: Red, black, white
- Nickname: Saints
- Sporting affiliations: NCAA Division II – GLVC
- Mascots: "Louie" the Saint Bernard and "LJ" Louie Jr.
- Website: maryville.edu

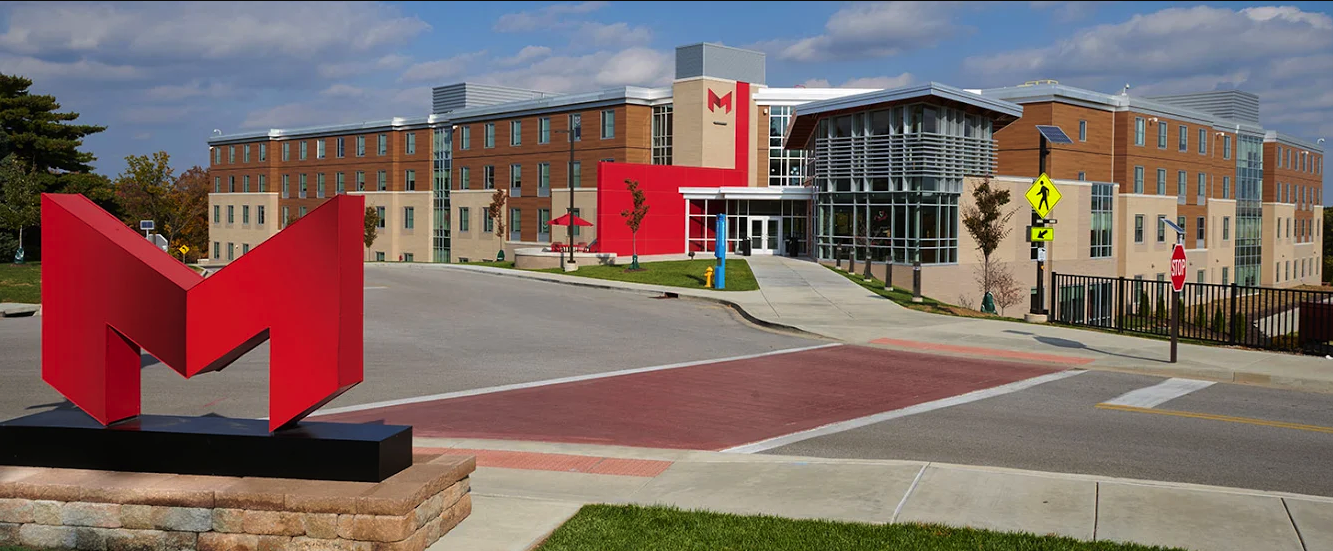
Saints Hall, Maryville University

Maryville University of St. Louis, formerly Maryville College of the Sacred Heart, is a private, historically Catholic university in Town and Country, Missouri, United States. It was founded on April 6, 1872, by the Society of the Sacred Heart and offers more than 90 degree programs at the undergraduate and graduate levels.

The school's name is derived from the shortening and altering of "Mary's Villa" when it opened as an all women-school near the order's original downtown St. Louis location in 1872. In 1961, it moved to suburban St. Louis and in 1968 began admitting men. Since 1972, the university has been governed by a board of trustees consisting mostly of members of the laity, although five of the trustees are always associated with the Society of the Sacred Heart. The school's athletic nickname is now the Saints.

== History ==
Maryville was founded on April 6, 1872, by the Society of the Sacred Heart and was originally called Maryville Academy of the Sacred Heart, functioning as a Catholic school serving underprivileged youth and young women. It was located in the Mount Pleasant neighborhood in South St. Louis on a 21-acre (8.5 ha) tract at 2900 Meramec Avenue. The main administration building was a five-story building with a cupola in the middle. The school became a junior college in 1921, then a four-year college in 1923 and was renamed Maryville College of the Sacred Heart.

In the late 1950s, the school purchased 290 acres (117.4 ha) of land adjacent to Interstate 64, which was then St. Louis' main east–west thoroughfare. The dedication of the new campus on this site in 1961 marked the beginning of Maryville's move toward being a community-oriented liberal arts institution. In 1968, the university became a co-educational institution.

In Maryville's centennial year of 1972, ownership of the college was transferred to a mostly lay board of trustees, though the Sacred Heart Sisters retain five seats. In 1981, Maryville launched Weekend College, making it possible for the first time for St. Louis-area working adults to complete entire degree programs entirely on weekends. In June 1991, Maryville made the transition to university status.

The old campus became the Augustinian Academy for Boys. It closed in 1972. Duchesne Hall burned in 1973 and was demolished, making way for the Maryville Gardens branch of the post office. The dormitories and other buildings were converted into the Maryville Gardens apartment complex.

The university library opened in 1988. Former President Keith Lovin initiated a significant amount of construction in 1997 with the construction of the new Art & Design Building and the link between academic buildings. The Donius University Center was completed in 2001, the new theatre auditorium opened in 2002, and apartment-style dormitories in 2003. An additional apartment building and the Buder Family Commons were completed in 2006.

In the fall of 2010, Potter Hall (residence hall) – which had been purchased from the Marriott Corporation – was opened for students, and construction began on the dining court in Gander Hall. On September 27, 2013, Maryville broke ground for Myrtle E. and Earl E. Walker Hall. Walker Hall opened in January 2015 and houses the Myrtle E. and Earl E. Walker College of Health Professions and the Catherine McAuley School of Nursing. A new residence hall is currently under construction, with an expected opening date of Fall 2016.

In 2020, Maryville University was named the "2nd fastest-growing" private university in the nation by The Chronicle of Higher Education. In addition to the main campus, Maryville University also operated centers in Lake Saint Louis and Sunset Hills in Missouri and Scott Air Force Base in Illinois. These centers offered facilities and services for students enrolled in the university's Weekend and Evening College. These centers are now closed.

== Academics ==
=== Academic units ===
There are six colleges and schools at Maryville University.

- The College of Arts and Sciences offers graduate and undergraduate programs within the five main areas of art and design, the humanities, science and mathematics, and the social sciences.
- The School of Education has a broad range of undergraduate and graduate programs in education. In Fall 2011, Maryville added a Doctor of Education program with a focus on Higher Education Leadership. Maryville uses a unique approach to this program. It delivers the class in a cohort of 15–22 students who advance through classes together (separate from the other concentration students), forming a supportive academic and professional network.
- The Catherine McAuley School of Nursing is named in recognition of a gift from Mercy and is the namesake of the founder of the Sisters of Mercy. The school continues a longstanding tradition at Maryville of ensuring a strong education in healthcare. Nearly 3,000 nursing graduates have completed their clinicals locally and their degrees online.
- The Walker College of Health Professions provides a wide range of programs in the health professions, including physical therapy, occupational therapy, music therapy, rehabilitation counseling, speech-language pathology, healthcare practice management, and communication science and disorders. Maryville is one of only three universities in Missouri to offer a degree in music therapy.
- The John E. Simon School of Business, named after the late St. Louis philanthropist, offers programs in accounting, marketing, e-business, business administration, information systems, cybersecurity, financial services, internet marketing, international business, sport business management, and other areas of business studies. In 2014, Maryville University launched an accelerated online MBA program for distance learners. The school fosters a strong relationship with Edward Jones Investments. The John E. Simon School of Business also houses the Maryville Virtual Lab for online learning in the cybersecurity field.
- The School of Adult and Online Education provides educational opportunities online and through the Weekend and Evening College on the main campus.

=== Ranking ===
Maryville University's ranking in the 2023 U.S. News & World Report edition of Best Colleges was tied at 249 in "National Universities". In the 2024 rankings, the university was tied with Purdue University Northwest, with a rank of 132 out of 185 in Best Online Master's in Nursing Programs. Maryville was also tied with Anderson University, Geneva College, Southwestern College, and University of Alaska-Fairbanks with a rank of 171 out of 359 in Best Online Bachelor's Programs. Additionally, it was also tied with Columbia College with a rank of 94 out of 98 in Best Bachelor's Programs for Veterans. Finally, Maryville was tied with the City University of Seattle and 15 other universities with a rank of 141 out of 214 in Best Bachelor's in Business Programs.

Forbes ranked Maryville University #421 on their list of Top Colleges in 2019. Maryville was not included in this ranking system in 2020 although it was previously included 4 times.

=== Accreditation ===
In 1925, Maryville, Fontbonne, and Webster Colleges were accorded the status of "corporate colleges" of Saint Louis University and were accredited by the North Central Association of Colleges and Secondary Schools. Maryville has been independently accredited since 1941.

As of 2023, Maryville University of Saint Louis is accredited by the Higher Learning Commission, a successor of the North Central Association of Colleges and Schools. The nursing program is accredited by the Commission on Collegiate Nursing Education and the Missouri State Board of Nursing. The Simon School of Business is accredited by the Accreditation Council for Business Schools and Programs (ACBSP). Teacher education is accredited by the National Council for Accreditation of Teacher Education (NCATE) and the Missouri Department of Elementary and Secondary Education. Relevant programs within the College of Arts and Sciences are accredited by the American Bar Association Standing Committee on Paralegals, the Council for Interior Design Accreditation (CIDA) (formerly known as FIDER), the National Association of Schools of Art and Design, and the National Association of Schools of Music.

=== Library ===
The Maryville University Library building opened in 1988 and was renovated in 2007 and again in 2015. It is a member of the Missouri Bibliographic Information User System (MOBIUS).

== Athletics ==
Maryville athletic teams are known as the Saints. The university competes at the NCAA Division II level in the Great Lakes Valley Conference (GLVC). Maryville was accepted into the GLVC for the 2009–10 school year when the school began transitioning to NCAA Division II athletics. Maryville became an active member of Division II in July 2011. The Saints had formerly competed in the St. Louis Intercollegiate Athletic Conference, a Division III conference, since 1989 and had competed in Division III sports since 1978. As of 2022, Maryville University received the Presidents' Award for Academic Excellence as a Division II school that has achieved an Academic Success Rate of 94%.

Maryville has 22 athletic teams competing in NCAA Division II, including men's baseball, basketball, cross country, football, golf, lacrosse, soccer, swimming and diving, tennis, track and field (indoor and outdoor), volleyball, and wrestling; and women's basketball, cross country, golf, lacrosse, soccer, softball, swimming and diving, tennis, track and field (indoor and outdoor), and volleyball. In 2027, the university plans to add a men's ice hockey team to compete at the Division I level.

== Student life ==
=== Residential halls ===
Maryville University has four residential spaces: Mouton Hall, Potter Hall, Saints Hall, and Hilltop Apartments.

== Notable people ==
=== Alumni ===
- Daniel Abebe, lawyer and law professor
- Jerry Costello, politician and former U.S. Representative for Illinois's 12th congressional district
- Sally A. Faith, mayor of Saint Charles, Missouri, from 2011 to 2019 and author
- Florence Magruder Gilmore (1881–1945), author and settlement worker
- Jeanne Kirkton, Democratic member of the Missouri House of Representatives
- Adelina Otero-Warren (1881–1965), first Hispanic woman to run for U.S. Congress
- Tom Saffell (1921–2012), professional baseball player

=== Faculty ===
- Rebecca Ehretsman, eighteenth president of Wartburg College
