= Pittsburg State University =

Public university in Pittsburg, Kansas, U.S.

- Former names: Auxiliary Manual Training Normal School (1903–1923); Kansas State Teachers College of Pittsburg (1923–1959); Kansas State College of Pittsburg (1959–1977)
- Motto: "By doing, learn." On seal: "Research, Instruction, Service"
- Type: Public university
- Established: March 6, 1903; 123 years ago
- Parent institution: Kansas Board of Regents
- Accreditation: HLC
- Academic affiliations: ASAIHL; Space-grant
- Endowment: $116.7 million (2025)
- President: Thomas W. Newsom
- Provost: Susan Bon
- Academic staff: 301
- Students: 5,383 (spring 2026)
- Location: Pittsburg, Kansas, United States; 37°23′29″N 94°42′09″W
- Campus: 600 acres (2.4 km^{2}); Distant town
- Other campuses: Kansas City
- Newspaper: The Collegio
- Colors: Crimson and gold
- Nickname: Gorillas
- Sporting affiliations: NCAA Division II – The MIAA
- Mascot: Gus the Gorilla
- Website: pittstate.edu

Pittsburg State University (Pitt State) is a public university in Pittsburg, Kansas, United States. It enrolls approximately 5,500 students (4,300 undergraduates and 1,200 graduate students) and is governed by the Kansas Board of Regents.

== History ==
Naming history
Years	Name
1903–1923	Auxiliary Manual Training Normal School
1923–1959	Kansas State Teachers College of Pittsburg
1959–1977	Kansas State College of Pittsburg
1977–present	Pittsburg State University

Pittsburg State University was founded in 1903 as the Auxiliary Manual Training Normal School, originally a branch of the State Normal School of Emporia (now Emporia State University). In 1913, it became a full-fledged four-year institution and dropped "Auxiliary" from the beginning of its name. In 1923, the institution changed its name to Kansas State Teachers College of Pittsburg, or Pittsburg State for short. Over the next four decades, its mission was broadened beyond teacher training. To reflect this, in 1959 its name was changed again to Kansas State College of Pittsburg. It became Pittsburg State University on April 21, 1977.

=== Presidents ===
Pittsburg State has had 14 leaders. The top leadership post was originally titled "principal" from 1903 to 1913. In 1913, the title was changed to president.

- Russell S. Russ (1903–1911)
- George E. Myers (1911–1913)
- William A. Brandenburg (1913–1940)
- O. P. Dellinger (1940–1941)
- Rees H. Hughes (1941–1957)
- Leonard H. Axe (1957–1965)
- George F. Budd (1965–1977)
- James Appleberry (1977–1983)
- Donald W. Wilson (1983–1995)
- John R. Darling (1995–1999)
- Tom W. Bryant (1999–2009)
- Steven A. Scott (2009–2022)
- Dan Shipp (2022–2025)
- Thomas Newsom (2025–present)

=== Apple Day ===
In 1907 a small delegation from the Pittsburg area lobbied the state legislature to give the newly established school an appropriation that would pay for the construction of the first permanent building. But one of the delegate members — either Pittsburg Mayor Clarence Price or the principal, R.S. Russ, depending on the source — broke the rules by not exiting the floor before the session began. The legislators good-naturedly fined the Pittsburg delegation a barrel of apples before awarding them the appropriation. When the two men returned to Pittsburg, the students were so amused that they decided university administrators and faculty who had missed work and class in order to lobby in Topeka should have to pay the same fine. In those days, students were penalized for truancy. Because members of the faculty left their classrooms to attend the legislative session in Topeka, the students reasoned that faculty members should be penalized for their absence.

Twelve months later, on March 6, 1908, classes were dismissed for the entire day in honor of the first Apple Day (officially titled Commemoration Day). During an afternoon program in the assembly room of the Central School building, the students once again fined the faculty a barrel of apples. Thus began a unique, annual tradition at Pittsburg State of the teachers bringing apples for their students — a tradition that continues today.

== The Gorillas ==
Pitt State is the only university in the United States to feature a gorilla as a mascot — something that is reflected on campus and throughout the community in the form of numerous gorilla sculptures.

In 1920, a group of young men dissatisfied with the state of school spirit organized themselves as the Gorillas — a slang term at the time for “roughnecks” — in order to accelerate college spirit. Thereafter, the Gorillas sponsored pep rallies, special trains to athletic events, and more. Their membership quickly grew in just a few years.

In 1923, the Gorillas asked art student Helen Waskey to make a drawing of their new mascot. Two years later, they offered their symbol as the official mascot of the school. On Jan. 15, 1925, the student body unanimously adopted the ferocious beast "as a name and synonym for the athletic teams."

Over time, the mascot became less ferocious and more loveable in appearance, being dubbed Gus and eventually finding a mate, Gussie (created by Charles Galvin in 1952 for a display in the Student Center).

Gus became a cartoon figure (first by Lee Green, art editor of the Kanza yearbook, in 1952) and a regular Joe College before the Class of '65 had him cast in fiberglass by art instructor Larry Wooster and installed at the south doors of the Overman Student Center.

=== Wooster Gorilla ===
The Wooster Gorilla, an iconic fiberglass sculpture created in 1965 by the late Larry Wooster, an art instructor, can be seen on the south side of the Overman Student Center facing what is referred to as "The Oval."

=== Champion Gorilla ===
Unveiled in October 2014 east of Carnie Smith Stadium is the Champion Gorilla, a 2,000-pound bronze gorilla created by artist Tom Corbin. It is the centerpiece of Champions Plaza.

== Academics ==
Pittsburg State University is organized into four colleges:

- College of Arts and Science
- Kelce College of Business
- College of Education
- Crossland College of Technology

=== Accreditations ===
The Kelce College of Business is accredited by the American Assembly of Collegiate Schools of Business (AACSB). The Crossland College of Technology's construction management and engineering technology programs are accredited by the Accreditation Board for Engineering and Technology (ABET). The College of Education is one of 34 higher education institutions from 15 states, the District of Columbia, and Puerto Rico to earn accreditation from the Council for the Accreditation of Educator Preparation.

=== Top scientists ===
In 2024, three faculty in the Pittsburg State University Chemistry Department were recognized on the World's Top 2% of Scientists list produced by Stanford/Elsevier: Professor Ram Gupta, Assistant Professor Mazeyar Parvinzadeh Gashti, and Assistant Professor Alessandro F. Martins. The scientists conduct their research in the National Institute for Materials Advancement.

=== Medical school partnership ===
Pittsburg State partnered with Kansas City University in 2024 and 2025 to launch two accelerated medical and dental programs to address physician and dentist shortages in rural Kansas and Missouri. The programs — AMP-UP (2024) and Rural Health Scholars (2025) — fast-track students from medically underserved rural counties in Kansas, Missouri, Oklahoma, and Arkansas into careers as osteopathic physicians or dentists. Qualifying students can earn a DO or DMD in seven years — one year faster than the traditional path.

=== Simulation hospital ===
A $8 million simulation hospital at the Irene Ransom Bradley School of Nursing was completed in 2023. It features advanced simulated patients capable of interacting with students and mimicking realistic medical emergencies, control and preparation areas, debriefing rooms, a waiting area, and a nurse’s station. The BSN, MSN, and DNP programs are accredited by the Commission on Collegiate Nursing Education, and the BSN and DNP are approved by the Kansas State Board of Nursing.

== Athletics ==
Pittsburg State Athletics wordmark

The Pittsburg State athletic teams are called the Gorillas.

Pittsburg State competes in 12 intercollegiate varsity sports: Men's sports include baseball, basketball, cross country, football and track & field (indoor and outdoor); while women's sports include basketball, cross country, soccer, softball, track & field (indoor and outdoor) and volleyball. Club sports include men's baseball.

The university is a member of the NCAA Division II ranks, primarily competing in the Mid-America Intercollegiate Athletics Association (MIAA) since the 1989–90 academic year. The Gorillas previously competed in the Central States Intercollegiate Conference (CSIC) of the National Association of Intercollegiate Athletics (NAIA) from 1976–77 to 1988–89; in the Great Plains Athletic Conference (GPAC) from 1972–73 to 1975–76; in the Rocky Mountain Athletic Conference (RMAC) from 1968–69 to 1971–72; in the Central Intercollegiate Athletic Conference (CIC) from 1923–24 to 1967–68; and in the Kansas Collegiate Athletic Conference (KCAC) from 1902–03 to 1922–23.

=== Football ===
The Pitt State football program began in 1908 under head coach Albert McLeland. Since that time, the program has produced the most wins in NCAA Division II history. It has been national champions on four occasions; 1957, 1961, 1991 and 2011. Pittsburg State defeated Wayne State University, 35–21 to claim its most recent national championship in 2011. During the 2004 season the Gorillas finished 14–1, losing 31–36 to Valdosta State University in the NCAA Division II National Football Championship. Pittsburg State has won, outright or shared, a total of 27 conference championships during the 96-year history of its intercollegiate program, including 13 conference titles in the last 19 seasons under Coach Chuck Broyles PSU reached the Division II National Championship game in 2004, 1995, and 1992. Its games with fellow MIAA Division II powerhouse Northwest Missouri State University are played at Arrowhead Stadium in Kansas City, Missouri, in the Fall Classic at Arrowhead. 26,695 attended the 2002 game—the most of any Division II game.

== Campus ==
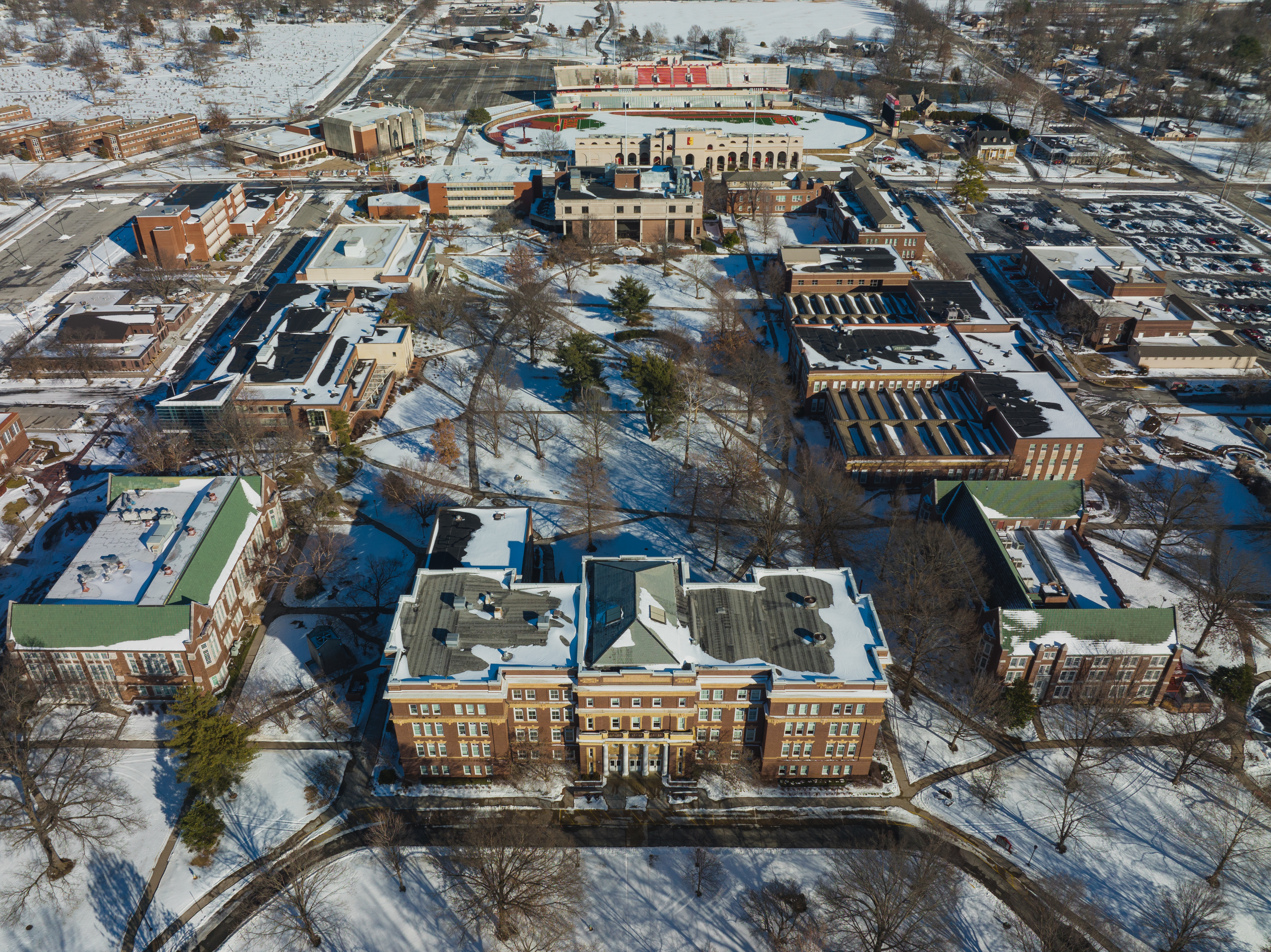
Aerial view of Pittsburg State University's main campus after snowfall in January 2022

Located in southeast Kansas, the school is on a 600-acre (2.4 km^{2}) campus that includes a mix of historic and modern facilities. Among them:

=== Axe Library and Special Collections ===
Located in Axe Library, Special Collections houses rare and historic materials chronicling Pittsburg State University and Southeast Kansas. Frequently used collections include the Haldeman-Julius Collection, Congressman Joseph Skubitz papers, the Eva Jessye Collection, the Tri-State Lead and Zinc Producers Association papers, and the Jefferson Highway Association Collection. The library also manages the Pittsburg State University Digital Commons Repository and the university’s Open Educational Resources. It is home to The Writing Center, The H.W. Smith Student Success Center, and Career Development. It is open to the public.

=== Bicknell Family Center for the Arts ===
The Bicknell Family Center for the Arts opened on December 7, 2014. Named for local entrepreneur Gene Bicknell and his family, it provides the university its first large performance and rehearsal venue since 1978 when deterioration forced the closure of Carney Hall. In includes the 1,100-seat Linda & Lee Scott Performance Hall, a 280-seat theater, a 2,000-square-foot art gallery, grand lobby, rehearsal hall, meeting rooms, and scene shop. The Bicknell Center is home to KRPS 89.9, the region's National Public Radio affiliate.

=== Block22 ===
Block22 is a mixed-use development located in the heart of Pittsburg at Fourth and Broadway, one mile from campus. It consists of four historic buildings renovated in 2018 and dedicated in 2019 as a joint project by the university, the City of Pittsburg, and the Vecino Group. The buildings are home to 98 student loft-style apartments, four private businesses, conference rooms, offices, and entrepreneurial spaces. The project was named one of the top university-led projects in the nation by the University Economic Development Association.

=== Carnie Smith Stadium ===
Carnie Smith Stadium is home to the winningest football program in NCAA Division II. Built in 1923 with 5,000 seats on what was then the south edge of campus, it was named Brandenburg Stadium in honor of the university’s first president, William Brandenburg. It is surrounded by a rock wall built in 1939 with Works Progress Administration funding as part of the New Deal. After major renovations in 1986, it was rededicated as Carnie Smith Stadium, named after the football coach who led the Gorillas to two NAIA national championships and six conference titles during his 17-year tenure (1949-1966). The field was named William A. Brandenburg Field. In 2001, second-level seating was added on the east side with 14 luxury skyboxes, elevator access, new restrooms, concession stands, ticket booths, and renovated locker rooms. The project also added 2,300 seats, bringing capacity to 7,950. In 2006, eight luxury skybox suites were added to the west side, along with elevator access. In 2008, the stadium’s video board, the “Jungletron,” was unveiled to give fans 2,800 square-feet of vibrant video and scoring updates. In 2019, it was upgraded, and in 2020, new turf was installed. Each project was funded by private donations from students, faculty, alumni, and community members. In 2026, a campaign was launched to build an end zone facility.

=== Crossland Technology Center ===
The Crossland Technology Center houses numerous state-of-the-industry technology programs in the largest academic building in Kansas.

=== Kelce College of Business ===
Beginning August 11, 2026, the Kelce College of Business will occupy a new building at Third and Broadway, replacing its longtime home on the university’s main campus. Designed to foster collaboration between students, faculty, and the regional business community, the new building features modern classrooms, research and innovation centers, experiential learning spaces, and community engagement facilities that support workforce development and economic growth throughout the region.

=== Nature Reach and the Natural History Reserve ===
Working out of PSU’s Biology Department since 1985, Nature Reach is an environmental education and wildlife outreach program of Pittsburg State University’s Department of Biology. It includes hands-on learning experiences, live animal programs, school outreach, camps, and community events at museums and nature centers.

The Nature Reach Natural History Reserve comprises 79 acres of reclaimed and naturally regenerated former strip-mined land southwest of Pittsburg. Once tallgrass prairie and farmland, the site has evolved through decades of natural succession into a diverse landscape of wooded spoil banks, wetlands, and more than 60 strip-mine lakes that support a rich variety of wildlife and educational opportunities. The reserve features a field laboratory, raptor care facilities, aquaculture tanks, a model prairie, and a large lake with a floating dock used for teaching, research, and hands-on field experiences. It is used by undergraduate and graduate students, scientists, campers, and community groups.

=== The National Institute for Materials Advancement (NIMA) ===
Formerly known as the Kansas Polymer Research Center, the National Institute for Materials Advancement is housed in the Tyler Research Center and focuses on advancing polymers, plastics, batteries, semiconductors, and other emerging materials. By bringing together researchers, students, and industry partners, NIMA develops innovative and sustainable technologies while supporting workforce development, applied research, and economic growth across the region and beyond.

=== Pittsburg State University Veterans Memorial ===
The Pittsburg State University Veterans Memorial was dedicated May 31, 2004. It features a half-scale replica of the Vietnam Memorial Wall in Washington, D.C., 3,500 engraved granite pavers honoring persons living and deceased who have served in the military, an online and print directory of names, 50 state flags, a reflecting pool, an eternal flame, and two large bronze sculptures. The 250-seat amphitheater is a venue for an annual Veterans Day Ceremony and the commissioning of cadets in the university’s ROTC program. The site is open to the public 24 hours a day, year-round.

=== Robert F. Plaster Center ===
The Robert F. Plaster Center, a $13 million, 154,000-square-foot athletic facility, opened in Spring 2015 as a venue for national indoor track and field competitions as well as university and community events such as the Four State Farm Show and Special Olympics. Named for the founder of Empire Gas Company and a philanthropist who created the Robert W. Plaster Foundation, it includes the 300-meter Harvey Dean Track, a 100-yard turf field, an 11,000-square-foot strength facility, locker rooms, and seating for up to 1,500 spectators.

=== Russ Jewett Outdoor Track & Field Complex ===
The Russ Jewett Outdoor Track & Field Complex was dedicated May 1, 2026, during the MIAA Outdoor Track & Field Championships and hosts large-scale national and regional events. For more than 35 years, Russ Jewett was head coach of the men’s and women’s track and field and cross country programs, retiring from coaching in 2021. He guided the Gorillas to historic success at both the conference and national levels and is one of the most decorated coaches in history.

=== Sperry Herbarium ===
The T.M. Sperry Herbarium at Pittsburg State University is a nationally recognized botanical collection dedicated to the study, documentation, and preservation of plant diversity. Established in 1946, the herbarium houses more than 50,000 preserved plant specimens representing southeastern Kansas, the Great Plains, and regions throughout the United States and around the world. It serves as an important resource for teaching, research, and community outreach, providing students and scientists with opportunities to study plant taxonomy, biodiversity, ecology, and conservation. Through its growing collections and digital databases, the Sperry Herbarium helps document changes in plant distributions and supports ongoing scientific discovery. It was named for botanist and educator Dr. Theodore M. Sperry, who founded the collection in 1946.

== Economic Impact ==
Pittsburg State is a significant economic institution in Southeast Kansas. It is a major employer with 1,500 full- and part-time faculty and staff and part-time student employees. The university's academic programs are closely aligned with regional industry needs, particularly in education, business, technology, manufacturing, and applied sciences, supporting workforce preparation and economic growth across the region.

The university has expanded its role in economic development by working with businesses, local governments, and nonprofit organizations to strengthen regional prosperity. The Office of Economic and Community Engagement supports entrepreneurship, business consulting, research partnerships, community development initiatives, and innovation-based economic growth throughout Southeast Kansas.

One such project, Block22, has assisted 35 companies, helped generate 516 jobs, produced an estimated economic impact of $83.2 million, and returned approximately $1.45 million in local tax revenue.

Pittsburg State contributes to economic development through research, technology commercialization, and small business support. The university's Business and Economic Research Center provides economic forecasting, impact analysis, labor-market research, and data services for businesses and policymakers, while affiliated programs such as the Kansas Small Business Development Center offer consulting and assistance to entrepreneurs and small firms.

== Fine arts ==
Public art at Pittsburg State University includes sculptures, a mural, and paintings.

=== Joe Beeler sculptures ===
On the east side of Porter Hall is Night Song, a bronze sculpture of a Native American playing a flute, designed by renowned professional artist and Pitt State graduate Joe Beeler (Class of 1957). It was dedicated on October 11, 2001. In front of the Bryant Student Health Center is The Healer, another sculpture by Beeler.

=== Tom Corbin sculptures ===
Unveiled in October 2014 east of Carnie Smith Stadium is the Champion Gorilla, a 2,000-pound bronze gorilla created by artist Tom Corbin. It is the centerpiece of Champions Plaza. In the courtyard at the Crossland Technology Center is Corbin's three-piece sculpture, A Student's Life, dedicated on April 22, 2005.

=== Art galleries ===
Public art galleries at the university include the Harry Krug Gallery in Porter Hall and the University Gallery in Porter Hall.

=== Centennial Mural ===
The 43-foot by 41-foot Centennial Mural, designed by Mark Switlik (BFA 1979) to celebrate the university's 100th birthday, was completed in 2004 in Lindburg Plaza, on the north end of Nation Hall. He painted it using the fresco technique, incorporating pigment with water directly onto the building material.

=== Andy Warhol serigraph ===
A 1987 serigraph of Andy Warhol's Beethoven, II. 390 is on display on the first floor near the Art Gallery. It was unveiled on February 25, 2015. It is an artist's proof — Number 9 of 15 artist's proofs created. The Beethoven portfolio was the last collection produced by Warhol before his death on February 22, 1987. It consists of four different serigraphs, also known as a silkscreen or screen print, on Lenox Museum Board.

=== Sandzen and Raymer paintings ===
The university's permanent collection includes 31 works by two well-known artists, Birger Sandzen and Lester Raymer. Those works were donated in 2014 by the descendants of William and Norma Reals. Sandzen, a Swedish-American painter known for his landscapes of Kansas and the southwest, was a long-time member of the faculty at Bethany College in Lindsborg, Kansas. Oklahoma-born Raymer also settled in Lindsborg, where he operated a busy studio in Lindsborg until his death in 1991. Two paintings by Sandzen are on permanent display in the lobby of McCray Hall, the university's historic music building.

== Performing arts ==
=== PSU Jazz Festival ===
PSUFounded in 1974, the PSU Jazz Festival brings together student musicians, educators, and internationally acclaimed jazz artists each March. The festival is open to middle and high school bands and has grown from 14 to more than 70 from across the Four-State region. They participate in adjudicated performances ad clinics, and attend a featured evening concert. Noted performers have included Louie Belson, Maynard Ferguson, Doc Severinson, The Count Basie Orchestra, The Tom Kubis Big Band, Wycliffe Gordon, to name a few.

=== Hispanic Music Festival ===
The Hispanic Music Festival at Pittsburg State University was founded in 2024 and each September and October brings together students, faculty, alumni, and community members through concerts, educational programs, cultural events, and guest artist performances at venues across campus and throughout Pittsburg.

== Student Life ==
There are more than 150 student organizations including academic, professional, cultural, honorary, service, and special-interest groups. The Student Government Association (SGA) serves as the university's student governing body, while the Gorilla Activities Board (GAB) sponsors campus events and activities throughout the academic year.

Fraternity and sorority life is a longstanding part of student life at the university. As of 2026, the campus is home to seven fraternities and three sororities, with organizations affiliated with national Greek-letter organizations. These organizations participate in leadership development, philanthropic and community service activities, social events, and recruitment. Fraternities include Alpha Phi Alpha, Lambda Chi Alpha, Phi Sigma Kappa, Pi Kappa Alpha, Sigma Chi, Sigma Phi Epsilon, and Sigma Tau Gamma. The fraternity community is governed by the Interfraternity Council (IFC). Sorority chapters include Alpha Gamma Delta, Alpha Sigma Alpha, and Sigma Sigma Sigma. The sororities are governed by the Panhellenic Council.

The Student Recreation Center is the university's primary recreation facility, offering fitness equipment, intramural and club sports, group fitness classes, and other recreational activities.

== Notable people ==
- Fira Basuki, novelist
- John Brown, professional football player
- Gary Busey, film actor (attended; did not graduate)
- Terry Calloway, politician
- Eldon Danenhauer, professional football player
- Ralph Earhart, professional football player
- Dennis Franchione, college football
- Eugene Maxwell Frank, bishop of the United Methodist Church
- Willie Fritz, college football coach
- Kendall Gammon, professional football player
- Don Gutteridge, professional baseball player and manager
- Jay W. Hood, major general, U.S. Army
- David P. Hurford, psychologist
- John E. Jacobs, educator
- Inez Y. Kaiser, first African-American woman to run a public relations company with national clients
- David Kan, businessman
- Jennifer Knapp, musician
- Jake LaTurner, politician
- Sherm Lollar, professional baseball player
- Aaron McConnell, professional football player
- Ronald Moore, professional football player
- Brian Moorman, professional football player
- Sam Pittman, college football coach
- Jim Press, businessperson
- John Roderique, high school football coach with the most state titles in Missouri history
- H. Lee Scott, Wal-Mart president and CEO
- Steven A. Scott, ninth president of Pittsburg State University
- Michael Shonrock, president of Emporia State University
- Joe Skubitz, politician
- Sally Stonecipher, first female United States Army helicopter pilot
- James Tate, writer who won the 1992 Pulitzer Prize for poetry
- Duane Thiessen, lieutenant general, United States Marine Corps
- Ahasanul Islam Titu, politician
- Lucinda Todd, civil rights activist and plaintiff, Brown vs. Board of Education of Topeka
- Jackie Vietti, president of Butler Community College
- Steve Weddle, novelist
- Stephen Wiggins, applied mathematician
- Pat Woodrum, civil servant
- Darryl Wren, professional football player
- Douglas Youvan, biophysicist
