= Jeanne Kirkton =

American politician

Member of the Missouri House of Representatives from the 91st district
- In office 2009–2017
- Succeeded by: Sarah Unsicker

Personal details
- Born: October 11, 1953 (age 72) St. Charles, Missouri
- Party: Democratic
- Spouse: Larry King
- Children: One

Jeanne Kirkton (born October 11, 1953) is an American politician. She was a member of the Missouri House of Representatives from 2009 to 2017. She is a member of the Democratic party.

She was a member of the Webster Groves City Council from 2006 to 2008. She was a critical care nurse from 1973 to 1982 and a nurse anesthetist from 1982 to 1992.

Kirkton is a 1971 graduate of St. Charles High School. She has a degree in nursing from Maryville University (1973), a certificate from Barnes Hospital School of Nurse Anesthesia (1982), and a bachelor's degree in history and political science from Webster University (1996).
