= Sarah Unsicker =

American politician

Member of the Missouri House of Representatives
- In office January 4, 2017 – January 8, 2025
- Preceded by: Jeanne Kirkton
- Succeeded by: Ray Reed
- Constituency: 83rd (2017–2021); 91st (2021–2025)

Personal details
- Party: Democratic
- Education: Washington University in St. Louis (JD)

Sarah Unsicker is an American politician who served in the Missouri House of Representatives from the 83rd and 91st districts from 2017 to 2025. She was a member of the Democratic caucus until her expulsion for antisemitism in 2023.

== Early life and education ==
Unsicker graduated from Washington University School of Law with a Juris Doctor in 2005.

== Career ==
Jeanne Kirkton, a member of the Missouri House of Representatives from the 91st district, declined to run for reelection in 2016. Unsicker won the Democratic nomination without opposition and defeated Republican nominee Greg Mueller. She was reelected in 2018, and reelected from the 91st district in 2020 and 2022. Representatives being limited to four terms prevented Unsicker from running for reelection after 2022.

On March 8, 2023, Unsicker announced that she would seek the Democratic nomination for Missouri Attorney General in the 2024 election. Unsicker was removed from her position on four committees on December 7, 2023, after she repeatedly posted a photo on social media of herself with far-right activist and Holocaust denier Charles C. Johnson. She withdrew from the attorney general race on December 14, but made antisemitic remarks against her opponent Elad Gross in the post announcing her withdrawal.

The Democratic caucus voted to expel her on December 21, 2023. Speaker Dean Plocher appointed Unsicker to the Special Committee on Government Accountability in 2024, and declined to answer why he chose to do so. On January 8, 2024, Unsicker announced at the United States Capitol that she would run for governor and Eric Garland, a conspiracy theorist, was her campaign manager. Her filing fee was rejected by the Democrats on February 27, which prevented her from running in the Democratic gubernatorial primary.

== Political positions ==
Unsicker opposed the expansion of charter schools in 2017. She proposed the creation of a committee to study Missouri's maternal mortality rate in 2018, but the house voted 78 to 49 against it. She opposed an eight-week abortion ban passed in 2019, stating that "We will be killing women with this bill". She was critical of legislation by Mary Elizabeth Coleman that would allow private lawsuits against people who aid in the facilitation of an abortion. She proposed legislation to end the usage of capital punishment in 2023.

== Electoral history ==
Electoral history of Kurt Wright
| Year | Office | Party | Primary | | | General | | | Result | Ref. |
| Year | Office | Party | Total | % | P. | Total | % | P. | Result | Ref. |
|---|---|---|---|---|---|---|---|---|---|---|
| 2016 | Missouri House of Representatives (83rd) | Democratic | 3,530 | 100% | 1st | 12,287 | 56.50% | 1st | Won | |
| 2018 | Missouri House of Representatives (83rd) | Democratic | 8,482 | 100% | 1st | 13,539 | 65.68% | 1st | Won | |
| 2020 | Missouri House of Representatives (91st) | Democratic | 8,471 | 100% | 1st | 18,156 | 100% | 1st | Won | |
| 2022 | Missouri House of Representatives (91st) | Democratic | 4,581 | 100% | 1st | 11,078 | 75.90% | 1st | Won | |

== Works cited ==
=== Election reports ===
- "2016 Missouri Election Results" (PDF). Secretary of State of Missouri. Archived from the original on February 28, 2025.
- "2016 Missouri Primary Results" (PDF). Secretary of State of Missouri. Archived from the original on February 28, 2025.
- "2018 Missouri Election Results" (PDF). Secretary of State of Missouri. Archived (PDF) from the original on September 1, 2025.
- "2018 Missouri Primary Results" (PDF). Secretary of State of Missouri. Archived (PDF) from the original on September 1, 2025.
- "2020 Missouri Election Results" (PDF). Secretary of State of Missouri. Archived (PDF) from the original on September 1, 2025.
- "2020 Missouri Primary Results" (PDF). Secretary of State of Missouri. Archived from the original on August 16, 2025.
- "2022 Missouri Election Results" (PDF). Secretary of State of Missouri. Archived (PDF) from the original on September 1, 2025.
- "2022 Missouri Primary Results" (PDF). Secretary of State of Missouri. Archived (PDF) from the original on September 20, 2025.

=== News ===
- "Sarah Unsicker". St. Louis Post-Dispatch. July 22, 2016. p. V7 – via Newspapers.com.
- Ballentine, Summer (February 27, 2024). "Exiled Missouri lawmaker blocked from running for governor as a Democrat". Associated Press. Archived from the original on March 1, 2024.
- Bayless, Kacen (December 18, 2023). "Embattled MO Democrat Unsicker drops out of AG race". The Kansas City Star. p. A1 – via Newspapers.com.
- Erickson, Kurt (December 9, 2023). "Local state lawmaker loses House committee posts". St. Louis Post-Dispatch. p. A8 – via Newspapers.com.
- Holleman, Joe (March 16, 2023). "Marketing firm on weed tax also did pandemic publicity for county". St. Louis Post-Dispatch. p. A2 – via Newspapers.com.
- Huguelet, Austin (May 22, 2019). "Ban". Springfield News-Leader. p. A1 – via Newspapers.com.
- Keller, Rudi (March 13, 2023). "Democrates join race for Missouri A.G." Columbia Daily Tribune. p. A1 – via Newspapers.com.
- Kull, Katie (March 17, 2017). "Missouri House passes charter expansion bill". St. Joseph News-Press. p. A11 – via Newspapers.com.
- Marso, Andy (June 4, 2018). "Despite Missouri being among worst for maternal mortality, lawmakers say no to study". The Kansas City Star. p. A1 – via Newspapers.com.
- Moore, Katie (December 5, 2023). "Death Penalty". The Kansas City Star. p. A7 – via Newspapers.com.
- Shorman, Jonathan (March 31, 2022). "Mo. measure on lawsuits over aiding abortions doesn't advance". The Kansas City Star. p. A5 – via Newspapers.com.
- Suntrup, Jack (April 5, 2016). "Democrats aren't running for many state seats". St. Louis Post-Dispatch. p. A6 – via Newspapers.com.
- Suntrup, Jack (December 22, 2023). "Democrats oust Unsicker from House caucus". St. Louis Post-Dispatch. p. A1 – via Newspapers.com.
- Suntrup, Jack (January 12, 2024). "Sarah Unsicker named to committee by House speaker". St. Louis Post-Dispatch. p. A2 – via Newspapers.com.
- Suntrup, Jack (January 10, 2024). "Shrewsbury state rep pivots to governor's race". St. Louis Post-Dispatch. p. A2 – via Newspapers.com.

=== Web ===
- "About Sarah Unsicker". Sarah Unsicker. Archived from the original on November 12, 2022.
