= Maryville Saints men's ice hockey =

- University: Maryville University
- First season: 2027–28 (planned)
- Arena: Maryville University Hockey Center; Chesterfield, Missouri
- Colors: Red and white

The Maryville Saints men's ice hockey program is an upcoming men's college ice hockey team that will represent Maryville University in NCAA Division I.

== History ==
=== Founding ===
Maryville University's first hockey team commenced play in the 2018–19 season in the American Collegiate Hockey Association (ACHA) at the club level. John Hogan was named the inaugural head coach.

In early 2025, Maryville University began exploring the feasibility of elevating their hockey team to the varsity level. At the 2025 Frozen Four, the school announced that they had begun a $5.5 million fundraising drive to elevate their ACHA club hockey team to varsity status at the NCAA Division I level. This included an expansion of their arena, the Maryville University Hockey Center, to increase the capacity to 2,000 and improve the gameday experience for students. By mid-2025, the university was approximately halfway to their goal, having raised $2.2 million. The plan to elevate the team to Division I was also supported by the nearby St. Louis Blues. By late February 2026, the school had raised over $4 million and the board of directors gave approval for the elevation of the team. On March 4, 2026, the university officially announced that they will be elevating their teams to the Division I level beginning in the 2027–28 season.

The Saints will play a transitional hybrid schedule for the 2026–27 season, including about 20 games against Division I opponents, before fully joining Division I in 2027–28.

== All-time coaching records ==
Tenure	Coach	Years	Record	Pct.
2027–	John Hogan	0	0–0–0	–
Totals	1 coach	0 seasons	0–0–0	–

== See also ==
- Maryville Saints
