= Steven A. Scott =

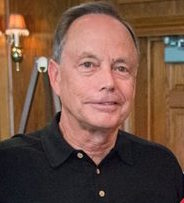

9th President of Pittsburg State University
- In office July 1, 2009 – June 30, 2022
- Preceded by: Tom Bryant
- Succeeded by: Daniel Shipp

Provost & Vice President of Academic Affairs at Pittsburg State University
- In office July 1, 2006 – June 30, 2009
- Preceded by: Robert Ratzlaff
- Succeeded by: Lynette Olson

Personal details
- Born: November 12, 1952 (age 73) Baxter Springs, Kansas
- Spouse: Cathy
- Education: Pittsburg State University; Oklahoma State University–Stillwater
- Profession: Professor

Steven A. Scott, (born November 12, 1952) is an American educator and the ninth president of Pittsburg State University. Scott served as the provost and vice president of academic affairs at Pittsburg State University, and before that, various positions at Pitt State prior to being president.

== Biography ==
=== Education ===
Scott attended Pittsburg State University, where he graduated Omicron Delta Kappa in 1973 with a Bachelor of Science in education with a mathematics emphasis. Scott received his master's degree in 1977 and his educational doctorate in 1990 from the Oklahoma State University–Stillwater.

=== Early career ===
After graduating from Pitt State, Scott became a high school teacher in Oklahoma where he also coached. In 1989, Scott moved back to Kansas where he began his long career at Pitt State, starting out as an assistant professor in education. Ten years later in 1999, Scott became Pitt State's Dean of College of Education, serving only seven years before being moved up to vice president for academic affairs in 2006.

=== Pittsburg State University ===
On May 2, 2009, the Kansas Board of Regents announced Scott as Pittsburg State University's ninth president. Since becoming president in 2009, Scott has created new doctoral degrees, construction of new buildings, and expansions of buildings. In July 2021, Scott announced he would retire at the end of June 2022.

=== Family ===
Scott is the brother of former Wal-Mart CEO, H. Lee Scott.
