= Maryville Saints =

- University: Maryville University of St. Louis
- Conference: GLVC–West Division
- NCAA: Division II
- Athletic director: Brittany C. Fennell
- Location: Town and Country, Missouri
- Varsity teams: 24
- Arena: Moloney Arena in John E. and Adaline Simon Athletic Center
- Ice hockey arena: Maryville University Hockey Center
- Baseball stadium: Weber Baseball Field
- Mascot: Louie
- Nickname: Saints
- Colors: Red and white
- Website: maryvillesaints.com

The Maryville Saints are the athletic teams that represent Maryville University of St. Louis, located in Town and Country, Missouri, in NCAA Division II intercollegiate sports. The Saints compete as members of the West Division of the Great Lakes Valley Conference (GLVC) for 23 of their 24 varsity sports. The only current exception is men's volleyball, in which it competes as a de facto Division I independent. (Note: The NCAA's top-level men's volleyball championship is open to members of Divisions I and II. Scholarship limits for that sport are identical for members of both divisions.) Men's volleyball will move to the GLVC when the conference begins sponsoring that sport in the 2026 season (2025–26 school year). Maryville has been a full member of the GLVC since 2009 and became an active member of Division II in July 2011.

The Saints had formerly competed in the St. Louis Intercollegiate Athletic Conference, a Division III conference, since 1989 and had competed in Division III sports since 1978.

== Varsity teams ==
Men's sports	Women's sports
Baseball	Basketball
Basketball	Bowling
Cross country	Cross country
Golf	Field hockey
Ice hockey (planned 2027)	Golf
Lacrosse	Lacrosse
Soccer	Soccer
Swimming	Softball
Tennis	Tennis
Track and field^{1}	Track and field^{1}
Volleyball	Volleyball
Wrestling	
^{1} – includes both indoor and outdoor

== Individual sports ==
=== Wrestling ===
In 2011, Maryville added wrestling to its athletic program. Head Coach Mike Denney previously led the University of Nebraska-Omaha (UNO) to Division II dominance with seven NCAA Division II titles before the program was eliminated just before UNO's transition to Division I. With the majority of the wrestlers having transferred from the UNO program, Maryville qualified for the NCAA championship in its first season and is consistently one of the top teams in Division II, placing third at the national championships in 2014 and 2015.
