= Parkside Rangers =

Sports teams of University of Wisconsin–Parkside

- University: University of Wisconsin–Parkside
- Conference: Great Lakes Intercollegiate Athletic Conference; Northern Sun Intercollegiate Conference (wrestling)
- NCAA: Division II
- Athletic director: Adam Schemm
- Location: Somers, Wisconsin
- Varsity teams: 13
- Basketball arena: DeSimone Gymnasium
- Baseball stadium: Oberbrunner Field
- Softball stadium: Case Softball Complex
- Soccer stadium: Wood Road Field
- Other venues: Petretti Fieldhouse
- Mascot: Ranger Bear
- Nickname: Rangers
- Colors: Green and Black
- Website: parksiderangers.com
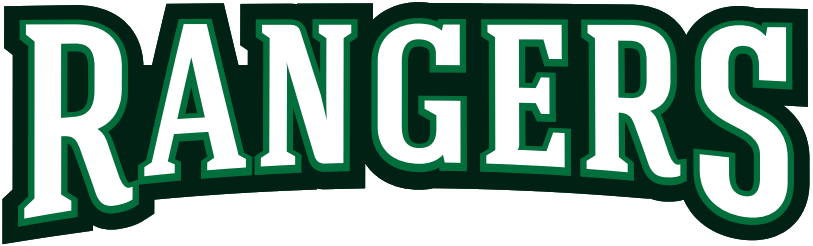

The Parkside Rangers (formerly Wisconsin–Parkside Rangers or UW–Parkside Rangers) are the athletic teams that represent the University of Wisconsin–Parkside, located in Somers, in NCAA Division II intercollegiate sports. The Rangers compete as members of Great Lakes Intercollegiate Athletic Conference (GLIAC) for 12 of 13 sports; the wrestling team competes in the Northern Sun Intercollegiate Conference (NSIC).

UW–Parkside has been a member of the GLIAC since the 2018–19 school year, at which time it adopted its current athletic branding as "Parkside". The Rangers were previously members of the Great Lakes Valley Conference (GLVC) from 1994–95 to 2017–18.

== Nickname ==
UW–Parkside's nickname is the Rangers. The university's mascot, depicted by a brown bear in a Parkside jersey, is Ranger Bear. In January 2011 Ranger Bear qualified for the first time for the Universal Cheer Association Mascot Nationals, where he took third place.

== Varsity teams ==
=== List of teams ===
Men's sports (7)

- Baseball
- Basketball
- Cross country
- Golf
- Soccer
- Track and field
- Wrestling

Women's sports (6)

- Basketball
- Cross country
- Soccer
- Softball
- Track and field
- Volleyball

== National championships ==
=== Team ===
Sport	Association	Division	Year	Opponent/Runner-up	Score
Women's cross country (2)	NAIA	Single	1980	Emporia State	52–100
Women's cross country (2)	NAIA	Single	1986	Emporia State	121–151

== Conference championships ==
Parkside teams have won GLVC championships in men's soccer (2000), women's cross country (2007) and women's soccer (2008).

UWP teams have yet to win a national championship at the Division II level. However, Ranger athletes have won a total of eight individual NCAA championships: one in women's indoor track and field and seven in wrestling.
