= Lone Star Conference =

American collegiate athletic conference

- Association: NCAA
- Founded: 1931
- Commissioner: Jay Poerner (since August 1, 2014)
- Sports fielded: 18; men's: 9; women's: 9
- Division: Division II
- No. of teams: 18 (19 in 2027, 20 in 2028)
- Headquarters: Richardson, Texas
- Region: Southwestern United States
- Website: lonestarconference.org

Locations
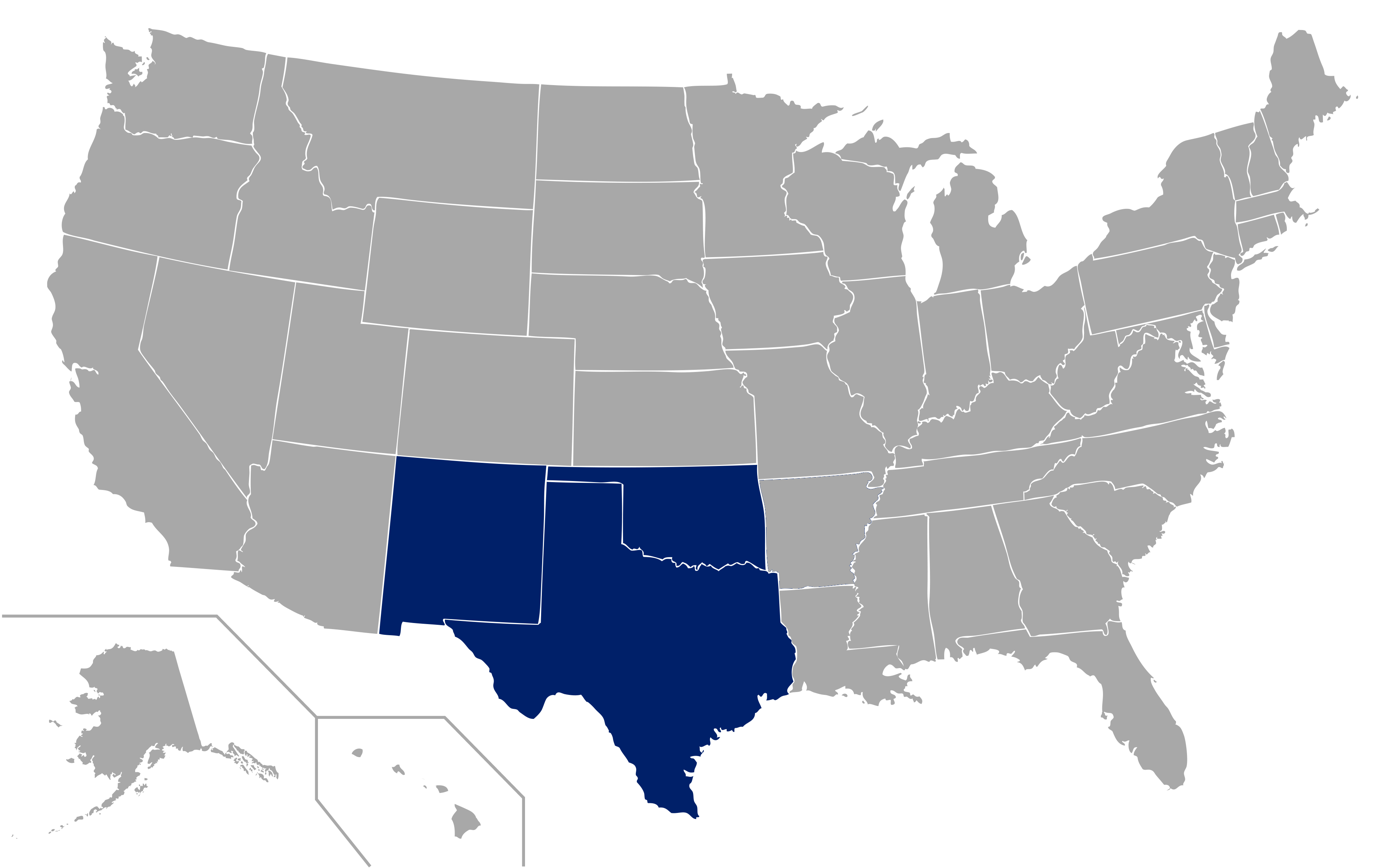

The Lone Star Conference (LSC) is a college athletic conference affiliated with the National Collegiate Athletic Association (NCAA) at the Division II level. Member institutions are located in the South Central states, with schools in Texas, Oklahoma, and New Mexico, with two members in the Pacific Northwest states of Oregon and Washington competing as affiliates for football only.

The Lone Star Conference operates from the same headquarters complex in the Dallas suburb of Richardson as the American Southwest Conference.

== History ==
The conference was formed in 1931 when five schools withdrew from the old Texas Intercollegiate Athletic Association. Charter members included East Texas State (now East Texas A&M), North Texas State (now University of North Texas), Sam Houston State, Southwest Texas State (now Texas State), and Stephen F. Austin. With East Texas A&M (then named Texas A&M-Commerce) starting its transition to Division I in July 2022, none of the five charter members remain in Division II or in the conference - all have moved up to Division I (in football as of 2024, North Texas, Sam Houston, and Texas State compete in NCAA Division I FBS, while Stephen F. Austin and East Texas A&M compete in NCAA Division I FCS).

=== Chronological timeline ===
Lone Star Conference
Location of Lone Star members: (football), (non-football), (future)

Below is a timeline of the conference's history.

- 1931 - The conference was formed on April 25, 1931, at a meeting in Denton, Texas, when five schools withdrew from the old Texas Intercollegiate Athletic Association. Charter members included East Texas State University (later Texas A&M University-Commerce, now East Texas A&M University), North Texas State University (now the University of North Texas), Sam Houston State College (now Sam Houston State University), Southwestern State College (later Southwest Texas State University, then Texas State University-San Marcos, now Texas State University) and Stephen F. Austin State College (now Stephen F. Austin State University). The conference constitution required member schools to sponsor football, basketball, track & field and tennis. The 1931-32 basketball season was the first sport to be competed within the conference. At the first annual conference business meeting on December 12, 1931, Trinity University was admitted to the LSC, effective for the 1932-33 academic year.
- 1933 - Trinity announced that the school was withdrawing from the LSC to return to the Texas Conference, but would still compete in the LSC until the 1933-34 academic year.
- 1934 - At the annual LSC business meeting in December, conference presidents considered Texas A&I University (now Texas A&M University-Kingsville), Sul Ross State Teachers College (later Sul Ross State College, now Sul Ross State University) and West Texas State Teachers College (later, West Texas State College, then West Texas State University, now West Texas A&M University) for admittance, but full membership was not granted at that time.
- 1938 - The Lone Star Conference joined the National Collegiate Athletic Association (NCAA).
- 1940 - The LSC Faculty Athletics Representatives voted, upon recommendation of the LSC Directors of Athletics, to add golf as a conference sport with the first championship scheduled for May 17, 1941 (of the 1940-41 academic year).
- 1941 - At the annual meeting on December 13, 1941, six days after the beginning of World War II, LSC members went on record as favoring "continuing a full sports program as long as it does not interfere with the nation's all-out war effort".
- 1942 - At the December 12, 1942, conference meeting, the LSC faculty athletics representatives approved football and basketball as conference sports during the war as long as transportation was available. All spring sports, excluding track, were discontinued.
- 1945 - On November 9, 1945, and with the end of World War II, a called meeting of conference directors of athletics and faculty athletics representatives was held in Waco, Texas. Basketball, tennis, track, golf, and football were planned as conference sports for the 1946-47 academic year. An invitation for conference membership was extended to the University of Houston and Southwestern University of Georgetown, Texas. Houston expressed a desire to schedule tentative basketball and football schedules, pending action to its board of regents. In addition, Trinity University and Howard Payne College (now Howard Payne University) were also discussed as possible new members.
- 1945 - On December 8, 1945, the University of Houston was officially admitted to the LSC.
- 1946 - On April 23, 1946, at a conference spring meeting, Trinity was admitted to the LSC, effective in the 1946-47 academic year; therefore, rejoining the conference after a 12-year hiatus.
- 1946 - On December 7, 1946, at a conference winter meeting, a vote was taken to add baseball to the list of LSC sports, effective in the 1947 spring season.
- 1947 - On May 16, 1947, Texas A&I University applied for admission to the LSC, but was never admitted due to some geographic concerns.
- 1948 - On December 10–11, 1948, at a winter meeting, Hardin College (later Midwestern University, now Midwestern State University) was admitted to the LSC by unanimous vote.
- 1949 - North Texas State University, the University of Houston, Trinity University, and Hardin College withdrew from the LSC, effective June 1, 1949, to form the Gulf Coast Conference.
- 1950 - Sul Ross State and Lamar State College of Technology (now Lamar University) were admitted to the LSC.
- 1953 - On December 12, 1953, Texas A&I University was admitted to the LSC and began competition in the 1954 fall season of the 1954-55 academic year.
- 1956 - McMurry College (now McMurry University) applied for LSC membership, but was voted down.
- 1956 - Howard Payne College was admitted to the LSC, effective the 1956-57 academic year.
- 1958 - Conference members approved a motion that the LSC must follow NCAA rules for football instead of NAIA rules.
- 1959 - On May 12, 1959, the LSC Faculty Athletics Representatives rejected a motion that the LSC should be expanded to a nine-school league with the votes 6-2.
- 1960 - The conference members voted to accept an invitation by the new Great Southwest Bowl committee to have the LSC football champion as the host team each year for the game in Grand Prairie, Texas, in late December. Texas A&I defeated Arkansas Tech University 45-10 in the first such game on December 31, 1960. Bowl Chairman Cecil Owens said, "We hope the game will be a fine supplement to the Cotton Bowl".
- 1962 - On December 7, 1962, at the annual conference meeting in Dallas, the LSC Faculty Athletics Representatives rejected a motion to allow LSC members optional membership in the NAIA or the NCAA, and rejected a motion that the decision of acceptance or refusal of postseason, playoff, or championship events resided within the individual schools. A motion that LSC did not pledge its champions to the NAIA playoffs was also defeated.
- 1963 - On May 11, 1963, at the annual conference meeting in Brownwood, Texas, Lamar Tech withdrew from the LSC, effective September 1, 1965.
- 1964 - On May 9, 1964, McMurry College was admitted to the LSC with first participation scheduled for spring sports in the 1965 spring season of the 1964-65 academic year, followed by basketball (achieving full member status) in the 1965-66 academic year, and eventually football in the 1966 fall season of the 1966-67 academic year.
- 1964 - Also in 1964, San Angelo College (later Angelo State College, now Angelo State University) attempted to apply to the LSC, but was told that LSC membership is limited to schools which had recognized four-year collegiate standing. San Angelo College's president Dr. B.M. Cavness told the LSC faculty athletics representatives that his school would assume such status in September 1965. He was advised to reapply in December 1965.
- 1965 - At the annual fall meeting in Dallas, the LSC faculty athletics representatives voted in a secret ballot not to expand membership in the LSC.
- 1968 - After achieving the status requirements since the first attempt, Angelo State College was finally admitted to the LSC. Tarleton State College (now Tarleton State University) was also admitted to the LSC.
- 1972 - McMurry left the LSC.
- 1973 - Abilene Christian College (now Abilene Christian University) was admitted to the LSC.
- 1975 - Tarleton State withdrew from the LSC.
- 1976 - Sul Ross State withdrew from the LSC.
- 1982 - The Lone Star Conference became an NCAA Division II athletic conference, thus leaving the NAIA.
- 1983 - Southwest Texas State (now Texas State), Sam Houston State and Stephen F. Austin left the LSC.
- 1984 - The LSC Council of Presidents extended an invitation for LSC membership to West Texas State University, and the WTSU Board of Regents accepted the invitation to begin LSC competition in the 1986–87 academic year. Eastern New Mexico University was automatically admitted to the LSC.
- 1986 - The LSC Council of Presidents unanimously approved the membership of Central State University (now the University of Central Oklahoma) to establish the concept of a regional conference. Eventually, the school officially became a member of the LSC on July 1, 1987, effective beginning competition within the conference in the 1987–88 academic year.
- 1987 - Howard Payne withdrew from the LSC, effective after the 1986–87 academic year.
- 1988 - The LSC Council of Presidents approved the admittance of Texas Woman's University to the LSC; effective in the 1989-90 academic year. Cameron University was automatically admitted to the LSC.
- 1989 - The LSC entered into consulting agreement with the Southwest Conference, allowing the SWC to advise the LSC in eligibility cases, aid in arbitration of protests, and provide interpretations of NCAA rules, as well as administer the National Letter of Intent program. At the time, Shirley Morton of Angelo State University served as secretary/treasurer and Garner Roberts of Abilene Christian University served as news director of the LSC.
- 1989 - West Texas State (now West Texas A&M) dropped football and withdrew from the LSC, effective at the end of the 1989-90 academic year.
- 1990 - On November 30, 1990, the LSC Council of Presidents requested an LSC expansion committee to be formed to contact institutions in Oklahoma and Arkansas regarding conference membership.
- 1991 - On April 28, 1991, the LSC Directors of Athletics considered a new football schedule recommendation from football coaches for the 1992 season if a replacement for West Texas State was not found.
- 1991 - On April 30, 1991, the LSC expansion committee was appointed to include Jerry Vandergriff of Angelo State, John "Skip" Wagnon of Central Oklahoma, Cecil Eager of Abilene Christian, and Dr. Margaret Harbison of East Texas State.
- 1991 - On June 1, 1991, at the LSC Council of Presidents meeting, Angelo State president Dr. Drew Vincent said, "there is a survival issue in the conference that has nothing to do with finances which was that the conference needed to be enlarged. East Central University, Southwestern Oklahoma State University and Northeastern State University might be interested in joining, as well as Tarleton State University and Midwestern State University.
- 1991 - On November 25, 1991, the LSC Directors of Athletics requested Central Oklahoma's Skip Wagnon to invite representatives from Henderson State University, the University of Central Arkansas, Fort Hays State University and Midwestern State University to a meeting on January 7, 1992, during the NCAA convention.
- 1992 - On November 24, 1992, the LSC faculty athletics representatives voted unanimously to recommend the Council of Presidents that an invitation should be extended to West Texas State University (which had reinstated football), to rejoin the conference.
- 1993 - On January 14, 1993, the LSC Council of Presidents voted unanimously to extend an invitation to West Texas State University, having the school to begin LSC competition for football in the 1996 fall season of the 1996-97 academic year, and to begin LSC competition for all other sports, effective in the 1994-95 academic year.
- 1993 - On June 19, 1993, the LSC Council of Presidents accepted the withdraw of Cameron University from the LSC, effective in the 1993 fall season of the 1993–94 academic year, following Cameron's decision to discontinue football.
- 1994 - On January 9, 1994, the LSC Council of Presidents voted unanimously to extend an invitation to Tarleton State University to join the LSC and compete in all sports except football for the 1994-95 academic year, if possible.
- 1994 - On May 2, 1994, the LSC Faculty Athletics Representatives announced that the Southwest Conference could no longer provide services to the Lone Star Conference, and recommended a conference office be established and a commissioner be hired.
- 1994 - On June 11, 1994, the Council of Presidents voted unanimously to establish an LSC office and to hire a commissioner.
- 1994 - On September 5, 1994, Fred Jacoby was named the first full-time commissioner of the Lone Star Conference with the charge to expand the conference, to assist the new members in NAIA to NCAA transition, and to train a person for commissioner in establishing a conference office.
- 1994 - On October 10, 1994, Ouachita Baptist University president Ben Elrod said that his university would join Harding University in applying for LSC membership.
- 1995 - On January 5, 1995, on a conference call of the LSC Council of Presidents, Midwestern State University was admitted to the LSC in a unanimous vote of 8–0, effective September 1, 1995, therefore rejoining the conference. Only six members competed in football (Eastern New Mexico, Abilene Christian, Angelo State, Texas A&M-Commerce, Texas A&M-Kingsville, and Central Oklahoma).
- 1995 - On January 8, 1995, at a joint meeting of the LSC Council of Presidents and the LSC Directors of Athletics at the NCAA convention in San Diego, a thorough discussion of conference expansion was held with the potential of developing two divisions of eight members each. The catalyst had been the fragmentation of NAIA Division I with member institutions moving to NCAA Division II. Discussion centered on universities in Oklahoma and Arkansas that had applied to NCAA Division II and the rationale for expansion. The consensus was that the LSC presidents should host a meeting of Oklahoma presidents to share information on expansion and to study the feasibility of developing a regional conference. A meeting would be set up in the next 60 days.
- 1995 - On August 29, 1995, on a conference call of the executive committee of the LSC Council of Presidents, a recommendation was approved to "take a proactive position regarding expansion with the development of a regional conference with two divisions".
- 1995 - On September 28, 1995, the executive committee of the LSC Council of Presidents met with the presidents of Northeastern State University, Southeastern Oklahoma State University, the University of Central Arkansas, Harding University and Ouachita Baptist University. Focus of discussion was that with expansion, a strategic long-range decision would be made to stabilize LSC membership, while providing flexibility for conference athletics programs in scheduling, postseason playoff competition, gender-equity guidelines, marketing potential, media coverage, NCAA legislative strength, enhancing the image of the conference, and economy of scale for the conference administration and services. Further, the downside to the proposed expansion/realignment was minimal.
- 1995 - On October 11, 1995, on a conference call of the LSC Council of Presidents, a recommendation was unanimously approved to extend invitations to Northeastern State University, Southeastern Oklahoma State University, the University of Central Arkansas, Harding University and Ouachita Baptist University for LSC membership. On November 14, 1995, all institutions listed above (except Central Arkansas) accepted membership in the LSC, effective in the 1996-97 academic year.
- 1996 - On March 6, 1996, Cameron was readmitted to the LSC, after a two-year hiatus.
- 1996 - Southwestern Oklahoma State University and East Central University were admitted to the LSC. With 17 members, the Lone Star Conference began competition with a north - south divisional alignment.
- 2000 - Harding University and Ouachita Baptist University withdrew from the LSC to join the Gulf South Conference.
- 2010 - The University of the Incarnate Word was admitted to the LSC.
- 2011 - East Central, Southeastern Oklahoma State and Southwestern Oklahoma State left the LSC to join with a few Arkansas schools to form the Great American Conference (GAC); while Central Oklahoma and Northeastern State left to join the Mid-America Intercollegiate Athletics Association (MIAA), although that latter pair of schools had to compete as full Division II Independents before beginning MIAA conference play competition during the 2012–13 school year.
- 2013 - Incarnate Word and Abilene Christian left the LSC to join the Southland Conference (SLC) of the NCAA Division I ranks. Abilene Christian was formerly a member of that conference from 1963-64 to 1972-73. At the same time, men's soccer was dropped as a conference sport.
- 2012 - Harding returned to the conference as an affiliate member for track & field from the 2013 to the 2015 spring seasons.
- 2013 - McMurry returned to the conference as an affiliate member for track & field during the 2014 spring season, and for football only during the 2014 fall season.
- 2016 - The University of Texas Permian Basin and Western New Mexico University were admitted to the LSC.
- 2016 - Oklahoma Panhandle State University was admitted to the LSC as an affiliate member for football only during the 2016 fall season.
- 2016 - Lubbock Christian University was admitted in the LSC as an affiliate member for track & field for the 2017 spring season.
- 2018 - Dallas Baptist University was admitted in the LSC as an affiliate member for track & field for the 2019 spring season.
- 2019 - Seven members of the Heartland Conference were admitted as full, non-football members to the LSC: the University of Arkansas-Fort Smith (Arkansas-Fort Smith or UAFS), Oklahoma Christian University, St. Edward's University, St. Mary's University and Texas A&M International University, with affiliate members Dallas Baptist and Lubbock Christian to upgrade as full members. Arkansas-Fort Smith (UAFS) is now the LSC's first member in Arkansas since Harding and Ouachita Baptist departed in 2000. Additionally, the University of Texas at Tyler joined the LSC as it began its transition from NCAA Division III. At the same time as the new members joined, men's soccer was reinstated as an LSC sport.
- September 2019 - Tarleton announced it would move to the Division I Western Athletic Conference (WAC) effective in July 2020 for all sports except football, which initially played as an FCS independent. The WAC would eventually reinstate its football league at the FCS level in 2021 with Tarleton as a member.
- September 30, 2021 – The Southland Conference announced that Texas A&M-Commerce (now East Texas A&M) would start a transition to Division I in July 2022, joining the Southland at that time.
- November 18, 2021 - The LSC announced that the three remaining football members of the Great Northwest Athletic Conference-Central Washington University, Simon Fraser University, and Western Oregon University - would become LSC football-only members effective in 2022.
- January 31, 2023 - Sul Ross State announces its intent to transition from NCAA Division III to Division II and rejoin the Lone Star Conference after 48 years in 2024.
- 2023 - The LSC announces it would be parting with Simon Fraser as an affiliate member following the 2023 football season. Shortly thereafter, Simon Fraser announces it would no longer sponsor varsity football as a sport, effective immediately.
- June 26, 2023 - Arkansas-Fort Smith (UAFS) announced it would leave the Lone Star Conference to join the Mid-America Intercollegiate Athletics Association (MIAA) in 2024.
- July 13, 2023 - Sul Ross State was approved for reclassification to Division II and announced they would officially join the conference on July 1, 2024.
- July 18, 2023 - The LSC announces it is adding STUNT as an official league sport, beginning in the spring of 2024. STUNT is a female sport that focuses on the skills and technical elements of cheer, including partner stunts, team routines, pyramids, basket tosses and more.
- July 20, 2023 - The University of Texas at Dallas announces it plans to transition from NCAA Division III to Division II in 2024 and join the Lone Star Conference in 2025.
- September 4, 2025 - Texas A&M University-Texarkana announced it had accepted an invitation to join the Lone Star Conference and would transition from the NAIA to Division II by 2027.
- August 19, 2026 - Texas Wesleyan University announced it had accepted an invitation to join the Lone Star Conference and would transition from the NAIA to Division II by 2028.

== Member schools ==
=== Current members ===
The LSC currently has 18 full members. All but five are public schools. Reclassifying members in yellow.

Institution	Location	Founded	Affiliation	Enrollment	Nickname	Joined (Note: Represents the calendar year when fall sports competition begins.)	Colors
Angelo State University	San Angelo, Texas	1928	Public (Note: Part of the Texas Tech University System.)	11,542	Rams & Rambelles	1968 (Note: The Angelo State men's basketball team joined the LSC a year after becoming a full member for other sports (1969–70); while its football team joined the LSC two years after (1970–71).)	
Cameron University	Lawton, Oklahoma	1908	Public	3,559	Aggies	1988	
Cameron University	Lawton, Oklahoma	1908	Public	3,559	Aggies	1996 (Note: Cameron left the LSC after the 1993–94 school year; before rejoining in 1996–97.)	
Dallas Baptist University (Note: Despite being a co-educational institution, Dallas Baptist still does not field women's basketball.)	Dallas, Texas	1898	Baptist	4,157	Patriots	2019 (Note: Dallas Baptist competed in the LSC as an affiliate member for men's and women's indoor track & field, and men's and women's outdoor track & field during the 2018–19 school year.)	
Eastern New Mexico University	Portales, New Mexico	1934	Public	5,737	Greyhounds	1984	
Lubbock Christian University	Lubbock, Texas	1957	Churches of Christ	1,595	Chaparrals & Lady Chaps	2019 (Note: Lubbock Christian competed in the LSC as an affiliate member for men's and women's indoor track & field, and men's and women's outdoor track & field from 2016–17 to 2018–19.)	
Midwestern State University	Wichita Falls, Texas	1922	Public	5,324	Mustangs	1948	
Midwestern State University	Wichita Falls, Texas	1922	Public	5,324	Mustangs	1995 (Note: Midwestern State left the LSC after the 1948–49 school year; before rejoining in 1995–96 as a provisional member for non-football sports, with men's & women's basketball returning later in 1996-97, and football returning in the 1997 fall season (1997–98 school year).)	
Oklahoma Christian University	Oklahoma City, Oklahoma	1950	Churches of Christ	2,153	Eagles & Lady Eagles	2019	
St. Edward's University	Austin, Texas	1885	Catholic (C.S.C.)	3,309	Hilltoppers	2019	
St. Mary's University	San Antonio, Texas	1852	Catholic (Marianists)	3,457	Rattlers	2019	
Sul Ross State University	Alpine, Texas	1917	Public (Note: Part of the Texas State University System.)	2,576	Lobos	1950	
Sul Ross State University	Alpine, Texas	1917	Public	2,576	Lobos	2024 (Note: Sul Ross State left the LSC after the 1975–76 school year; before rejoining in 2024–25.)	
Texas A&M International University	Laredo, Texas	1969	Public (Note: Part of the Texas A&M University System.)	8,532	Dustdevils	2019	
Texas A&M University-Kingsville	Kingsville, Texas	1925	Public	6,862	Javelinas	1954	
Texas Woman's University (Note: Despite being a co-educational institution since 1994, Texas Woman's still does not field men's sports.)	Denton, Texas	1901	Public	15,361	Pioneers	1989	
University of Texas at Dallas	Richardson, Texas	1961	Public (Note: Part of the University of Texas System.)	29,886	Comets	2025	
University of Texas Permian Basin	Odessa, Texas	1973	Public	7,372	Falcons	2016	
University of Texas at Tyler	Tyler, Texas	1971	Public	10,183	Patriots	2019	
West Texas A&M University	Canyon, Texas	1910	Public	9,037	Buffaloes	1986	
West Texas A&M University	Canyon, Texas	1910	Public	9,037	Buffaloes	1994 (Note: West Texas A&M left the LSC after the 1990–91 school year; before rejoining 1994–95 for non-football sports, with men's & women's basketball returning later in 1995–96, and football returning in the 1996 fall season (1996–97 school year).)	
Western New Mexico University	Silver City, New Mexico	1893	Public	3,531	Mustangs	2016	

=== Future members ===
Institution	Location	Founded	Affiliation	Enrollment	Nickname	Joining (Note: Represents the calendar year when fall sports competition begins.)	Colors	Current conference
Texas A&M University-Texarkana	Texarkana, Texas	1971	Public (Note: Part of the Texas A&M University System.)	2,109	Eagles	2027		Red River (RRAC) (Note: Currently an NAIA athletic conference.)
Texas Wesleyan University	Fort Worth, Texas	1890	United Methodist	2,595	Rams	2028		Sooner (SAC)

=== Affiliate members ===
The LSC currently has two affiliate members, both of which are public schools.

Institution	Location	Founded	Affiliation	Enrollment	Nickname	Joined (Note: Represents the calendar year when fall sports competition begins.)	Colors	LSC sport(s)	Primary conference
Central Washington University	Ellensburg, Washington	1891	Public	8,509	Wildcats	2022		football	Great Northwest (GNAC)
Western Oregon University	Monmouth, Oregon	1856	Public	3,823	Wolves	2022		football	Great Northwest (GNAC)

=== Former members ===
The LSC had 20 former full members, 13 of which were public schools.

Institution	Location	Founded	Affiliation	Enrollment	Nickname	Joined (Note: Represents the calendar year when fall sports competition begins.)	Left (Note: Represents the calendar year when spring sports competition ends.)	Current conference
Abilene Christian University	Abilene, Texas	1906	Churches of Christ	5,334	Wildcats	1973	2013	Western (WAC) (Note: Currently an NCAA Division I athletic conference.) (Note: The football team competes in the Division I FCS United Athletic Conference.) (United (UAC) in 2026)
University of Arkansas-Fort Smith	Fort Smith, Arkansas	1928	Public	5,379	Lions	2019	2024	Mid-America (MIAA)
University of Central Oklahoma	Edmond, Oklahoma	1890	Public	16,428	Bronchos	1987 (Note: The Central Oklahoma men's and women's basketball and football teams joined the LSC a year after becoming a full member for other sports (1988-89).)	2011	Mid-America (MIAA)
East Central University	Ada, Oklahoma	1909	Public	4,447	Tigers	1995	2011	Great American (GAC)
Harding University (Note: Harding competed in the LSC as an affiliate member for men's and women's indoor track & field, and men's and women's outdoor track & field from 2012-13 to 2014-15.)	Searcy, Arkansas	1924	Churches of Christ	6,009	Bisons & Lady Bisons	1995	2000	Great American (GAC)
University of Houston	Houston, Texas	1927	Public	47,090	Cougars	1945	1949	Big 12
Howard Payne University	Brownwood, Texas	1889	Baptist	1,400	Yellow Jackets	1956	1987	American Southwest (ASC) (Note: Currently an NCAA Division III athletic conference.)
University of the Incarnate Word	San Antonio, Texas	1881	Catholic (C.C.I.W.)	9,366	Cardinals	2010	2013	Southland (SLC)
Lamar University	Beaumont, Texas	1923	Public	16,191	Cardinals	1950	1965	Southland (SLC)
McMurry University (Note: McMurry competed in the LSC as an affiliate member for football during the 2014 fall season (2014-15 school year); also competed as an affiliate member for men's and women's indoor track & field, and men's and women's outdoor track & field during the 2013-14 school year.)	Abilene, Texas	1923	United; Methodist	1,430	War Hawks	1964	1972	Southern Collegiate (SCAC) (American Southwest (ASC) in 2026)
University of North Texas	Denton, Texas	1890	Public	42,372	Mean Green	1931	1949	American
Northeastern State University	Tahlequah, Oklahoma	1909	Public	8,276	RiverHawks	1995	2011	Mid-America (MIAA)
Ouachita Baptist University	Arkadelphia, Arkansas	1886	Baptist	1,569	Tigers	1995	2000	Great American (GAC)
Sam Houston State University	Huntsville, Texas	1879	Public	21,679	Bearkats	1931	1984	Conference USA (CUSA)
Southeastern Oklahoma State University	Durant, Oklahoma	1909	Public	3,889	Savage Storm	1995	2011	Great American (GAC)
Southwestern Oklahoma State University	Weatherford, Oklahoma	1901	Public	5,154	Bulldogs	1996	2011	Great American (GAC)
Stephen F. Austin State University	Nacogdoches, Texas	1921	Public	11,946	Lumberjacks & Ladyjacks	1931	1984	Southland (SLC)
Tarleton State University	Stephenville, Texas	1899	Public	13,996	Texans	1968	1976	Western (WAC) (United (UAC) in 2026)
Tarleton State University	Stephenville, Texas	1899	Public	13,996	Texans	1994	2020 (Note: Tarleton State withdrew from the LSC from 1976-77 to 1993-94. Its football program returned during the 1995 fall season (1995-96 school year).)	Western (WAC) (United (UAC) in 2026)
Texas A&M University-Commerce (Note: Currently known as East Texas A&M University since November 2024.)	Commerce, Texas	1889	Public	12,013	Lions	1931	2022	Southland (SLC)
Texas State University	San Marcos, Texas	1899	Public	38,231	Bobcats	1931	1984	Sun Belt (SBC) (Pac-12 in 2026)
Trinity University	San Antonio, Texas	1869	Nonsectarian	2,487	Tigers	1932	1934	Southern (SAA)
Trinity University	San Antonio, Texas	1869	Nonsectarian	2,487	Tigers	1946	1949 (Note: Trinity (Texas) withdrew from the LSC from 1934-35 to 1945-46.)	Southern (SAA)

=== Former affiliate members ===
The LSC had two former affiliate members, both of which were also public schools:

Institution	Location	Founded	Affiliation	Enrollment	Nickname	Joined (Note: Represents the calendar year when fall sports competition begins.)	Left (Note: Represents the calendar year when spring sports competition ends.)	LSC sport(s)	Primary conference while competing in LSC sport	Current primary conference
Oklahoma Panhandle State University	Goodwell, Oklahoma	1909	Public	1,207	Aggies	2016	2017	football	Heartland	Sooner (SAC) (Note: Currently an NAIA athletic conference.)
Simon Fraser University	Burnaby, British Columbia	1965	Public	35,604	Red Leafs	2022	2023	football (Note: Simon Fraser currently has the sport discontinued from the school's athletic program following the end of the 2022 fall season (2022-23 school year).)	Great Northwest (GNAC)	

=== Membership timeline ===
Full member (all sports) Full member (non-football) Associate member (football) Associate member (sport)

== Sponsored sports ==
The following divisional format is used for men's and women's basketball, and softball.
East
- Dallas Baptist (men's only)
- Oklahoma Christian
- St. Edward's
- St. Mary's
- Texas–Dallas
- Texas–Tyler
- Texas A&M International
- Texas A&M–Kingsville
- Texas Woman's (women's only)
West
- Angelo State
- Cameron
- Eastern New Mexico
- Lubbock Christian
- Midwestern State
- Sul Ross State
- Texas–Permian Basin
- West Texas A&M
- Western New Mexico

Conference sports
Sport	Men's	Women's
Baseball	✓	
Basketball	✓	✓
Cross country	✓	✓
Football	✓	
Golf	✓	✓
Soccer	✓	✓
Softball		✓
STUNT		✓
Tennis	✓	✓
Track and field indoor	✓	✓
Track and field outdoor	✓	✓
Volleyball		✓

=== Men's sponsored sports by school ===
School	Baseball	Basketball	Cross country	Football	Golf	Soccer	Tennis	Track and field indoor	Track and field outdoor	Total LSC Sports
Angelo State	✓	✓	✓	✓				✓	✓	6
Cameron	✓	✓	✓		✓		✓			5
Dallas Baptist		✓	✓		✓	✓	✓	✓	✓	7
Eastern New Mexico	✓	✓	✓	✓				✓	✓	6
Lubbock Christian	✓	✓	✓		✓	✓		✓	✓	7
Midwestern State		✓		✓	✓	✓	✓			5
Oklahoma Christian	✓	✓	✓		✓	✓		✓	✓	7
St. Edward's	✓	✓	✓					✓	✓	5
St. Mary's	✓	✓			✓	✓	✓			5
Sul Ross State	✓	✓	✓	✓		✓	✓			6
Texas A&M International	✓	✓	✓		✓	✓				5
Texas A&M–Kingsville	✓	✓	✓	✓				✓	✓	6
UT Dallas	✓	✓	✓		✓	✓	✓	✓	✓	8
UT Permian Basin	✓	✓		✓	✓		✓			5
UT Tyler	✓	✓	✓		✓	✓	✓	✓	✓	8
West Texas A&M	✓	✓	✓	✓	✓	✓		✓	✓	8
Western New Mexico		✓	✓	✓	✓		✓			5
Totals	14	17	14	8+2	12	11	9	10	10	113+2
Affiliate members
Central Washington				✓						1
Western Oregon				✓						1
Future members
Texas A&M–Texarkana	✓	✓	✓	(Note: Texas A&M–Texarkana will begin sponsoring football in 2027. They will initially play as an independent before beginning conference play in the LSC in 2028.)	✓	✓	✓	✓	✓	8
Texas Wesleyan	✓	✓	✓	✓	✓	✓	✓	✓	✓	9

Notes

Men's NCAA D2 National Champions
Sport	Team (Years)	Total
Cross Country	Abilene Christian (2007, 2009)	2
Football	Texas State (1981, 1982) East Texas A&M (2017)	3
Indoor Track and Field	Abilene Christian (1988, 1993, 1994, 1996, 1997, 1998, 1999, 2000, 2002, 2003, 2004, 2005, 2011)	13
Basketball	Northeastern State (2003)	1
Golf	Texas State (1983) Abilene Christian (1992)	2
Baseball	Southeastern Oklahoma State (2000), Angelo State (2023)	2
Soccer	Midwestern State (2025)	1
Outdoor Track and Field	Abilene Christian (1982, 1983, 1984, 1985, 1986, 1987, 1988, 1996, 1997, 1999, 2000, 2002, 2003, 2004, 2005, 2006, 2007, 2008, 2011), Texas A&M-Kingsville (2018)	20

=== Women's sponsored sports by school ===
School	Basketball	Cross country	Golf	Soccer	Softball	STUNT	Tennis	Track and field indoor	Track and field outdoor	Volleyball	Total LSC Sports
Angelo State	✓	✓	✓	✓	✓		✓	✓	✓	✓	9
Cameron	✓		✓		✓		✓			✓	5
Dallas Baptist		✓	✓	✓		✓	✓	✓	✓	✓	8
Eastern New Mexico	✓	✓		✓	✓			✓	✓	✓	7
Lubbock Christian	✓	✓	✓	✓	✓			✓	✓	✓	8
Midwestern State	✓	✓	✓	✓	✓		✓	✓	✓	✓	9
Oklahoma Christian	✓	✓	✓	✓	✓			✓	✓	✓	8
St. Edward's	✓	✓		✓	✓	✓		✓	✓	✓	8
St. Mary's	✓		✓	✓	✓	✓	✓			✓	7
Sul Ross State	✓	✓		✓	✓		✓			✓	6
Texas A&M International	✓	✓	✓	✓	✓					✓	6
Texas A&M–Kingsville	✓	✓	✓		✓	✓	✓	✓	✓	✓	9
Texas Woman's	✓			✓	✓	✓				✓	5
UT Dallas	✓	✓	✓	✓	✓		✓	✓	✓	✓	9
UT Permian Basin	✓	✓	✓	✓	✓		✓			✓	7
UT Tyler	✓	✓	✓	✓	✓		✓	✓	✓	✓	9
West Texas A&M	✓	✓	✓	✓	✓			✓	✓	✓	8
Western New Mexico	✓	✓	✓		✓		✓			✓	6
Totals	17	15	14	15	18	5	11	11	11	18	142
Future members
Texas A&M–Texarkana	✓	✓	✓	✓	✓		✓	✓	✓	✓	9
Texas Wesleyan	✓	✓	✓	✓	✓		✓	✓	✓	✓	9

Women's NCAA D2 National Champions
Sport	Team (Years)	Total
Volleyball	West Texas A&M (1990, 1991, 1997, 2022)	4
Indoor Track and Field	Abilene Christian (1988, 1989, 1990, 1991, 1993, 1994, 1995, 1996, 1997, 1998, 1999, 2000); West Texas A&M (2018)	13
Basketball	Lubbock Christian (2018, 2019)	2
Golf	Dallas Baptist (2021, 2023, 2025, 2026)	4
Softball	Angelo State (2004); West Texas A&M (2014, 2021); UT Tyler (2024, 2025)	5
Outdoor Track and Field	Abilene Christian (1985, 1986, 1987, 1988, 1994, 1995, 1996, 1998, 1999, 2008), West Texas A&M (2017, 2022, 2026)	13

=== Other sponsored sports by school ===
School	Men		Women				
School	Baseball	Swimming and diving	Beach volleyball (Note: De facto Division I sport. Beach volleyball, bowling, gymnastics, and women's wrestling all have single NCAA championship events open to members of all three divisions.)	Bowling	Gymnastics	Swimming and diving	Wrestling
Dallas Baptist	Pac-12 (Note: Dallas Baptist plays baseball at the D-I level; it is the only D-II school that does so.)						
Oklahoma Christian		RMAC		GLVC		RMAC	
Texas A&M–Kingsville			IND				
Texas A&M–Texarkana			TBA (Note: Texas A&M–Texarkana has not announced a future affiliation for its beach volleyball or bowling teams.)	TBA			
Texas Woman's					MIC		RMAC
UT Permian Basin		RMAC				RMAC	

Notes

In addition to the above:

- Arkansas–Fort Smith counts its male and female cheerleaders, plus its all-female dance team (called a "pom squad" on the school's athletic website), as varsity athletes.
- Cameron counts its female cheerleaders (though not male cheerleaders) and all-female dance team as varsity athletes under the collective name of "spirit team".
- Eastern New Mexico counts its female cheerleaders (though not male cheerleaders) and all-female dance team as varsity athletes under the collective name of "spirit squad". The school also fields a coeducational rodeo team.
- Lubbock Christian counts its female cheerleaders (though not male cheerleaders) as varsity athletes.
- Oklahoma Christian fields a varsity team in the non-NCAA sport of men's bowling.
- St. Edward's counts its male and female cheerleaders as varsity athletes.
- UT Tyler counts its cheerleaders (male and female) and dance team (all-female) as varsity athletes under the collective name of "spirit squad".

Only schools that explicitly list cheerleading and dance teams as men's, women's, or coed sports are counted in this listing. Some schools feature links to said teams on their athletics websites, but place them in a specific menu for "spirit teams" or a similar term.

== Facilities ==
School	Football stadium	Capacity	Basketball arena	Capacity	Baseball stadium	Capacity
Angelo State	LeGrand Stadium at 1st Community Credit Union Field	5,670	Stephens Arena	6,500	Foster Field	4,200
Cameron	Non-football school		Aggie Gym	1,600	McCord Field	1,200
Central Washington	Tomlinson Stadium	4,000	Football-only member			
Dallas Baptist	Non-football school		Burg Center	1,600	Plays baseball at the D-I level in Conference USA. DBU plays games at Horner Ballpark.	
Eastern New Mexico	Greyhound Stadium	5,200	Greyhound Arena	4,800	Greyhound Field	1,300
Lubbock Christian	Non-football school		Rip Griffin Center	1,950	Hays Field	3,000
Midwestern State	Memorial Stadium	14,500	D.L. Ligon Coliseum	3,600	Non-baseball school	
Oklahoma Christian	Non-football school		Payne Athletic Center	N/A	Dobson Field	N/A
St. Edward's	Non-football school		Recreation and Convocation Center	1,300	Lucian-Hamilton Field	N/A
St. Mary's	Non-football school		Bill Greehey Arena	3,800	Dickson Stadium	2,260
Sul Ross State	Jackson Field	4,000	Pete P. Gallego Center	3,200	Kokernot Field	1,400
Texas A&M International	Non-football school		TAMIU Kinesiology and Convocation Building	1,800	Jorge Haynes Field	500
Texas A&M-Kingsville	Javelina Stadium	15,000	Hampton Inn Court at the Steinke Physical Education Center (SPEC)	4,000	Nolan Ryan Field	4,000
Texas Woman's	Non-football school		Kitty Magee Arena	1,800	Non-baseball school	
UT Dallas	Non-football school		UTD Activity Center	3,200	UTD Baseball Field	N/A
UT Permian Basin	Ratliff Stadium	19,302	Falcon Dome	N/A	Roden Field	N/A
UT Tyler	Non-football school		Louise Herrington Patriot Center	2,000	Irwin Field	1,000
West Texas A&M	Bain-Schaeffer Buffalo Stadium	8,500-12,000	First United Bank Center	5,800	Wilder Park	490
Western New Mexico	Ben Altamirano Memorial Stadium	3,000	Drag's Court		Non-baseball school	
Western Oregon	McArthur Field	3,500	Football-only member			

== Champions ==
This is a list of conference champions since 1997.

=== Men ===
Year	Football (Overall)	Cross country	Soccer	Indoor Track	Basketball	Baseball	Golf	Tennis	Outdoor Track
1997	Texas A&M–Kingsville	Abilene Christian	Not sponsored	Not sponsored	Central Oklahoma	Central Oklahoma	Southwestern Oklahoma State	Rained out	Abilene Christian
1998	Central Oklahoma	Abilene Christian	Not sponsored	Not sponsored	Central Oklahoma	Texas A&M–Kingsville	Texas A&M–Commerce	Abilene Christian	Abilene Christian
1999	Southeastern Oklahoma State	Abilene Christian	Midwestern State	Not sponsored	Midwestern State	Southeastern Oklahoma State	Cameron	Rained out	Rained out
2000	Northeastern State	Abilene Christian	West Texas A&M	Not sponsored	Midwestern State	Abilene Christian	Central Oklahoma	Ouachita Baptist	Abilene Christian
2001	Texas A&M–Kingsville; Tarleton State	Abilene Christian	Midwestern State	Not sponsored	West Texas A&M	Abilene Christian	Cameron	Midwestern State	Abilene Christian
2002	Texas A&M–Kingsville; Abilene Christian	Abilene Christian	Midwestern State	Not sponsored	Northeastern State	Abilene Christian	Central Oklahoma	Abilene Christian	Abilene Christian
2003	Texas A&M-Kinsville	Abilene Christian	Midwestern State; Northeastern State; West Texas A&M	Not sponsored	West Texas A&M	Southeastern Oklahoma State	Central Oklahoma	Abilene Christian	Abilene Christian
2004	Texas A&M–Kingsville; Midwestern State	Abilene Christian	No Champion	Not Sponsored	Tarleton State	Texas A&M–Kingsville	Cameron	Abilene Christian	Abilene Christian
2005	West Texas A&M	Abilene Christian	Midwestern State; Incarnate Word	Not sponsored	Texas A&M–Commerce	No Champion	Northeastern State	Abilene Christian	Abilene Christian
2006	West Texas A&M; Tarleton State	Abilene Christian	Midwestern State	Not sponsored	West Texas A&M	Central Oklahoma	Northeastern State	Midwestern State	Abilene Christian
2007	West Texas A&M	Abilene Christian	Midwestern State; West Texas A&M	Not sponsored	Midwestern State	Angelo State	Northeastern State	Abilene Christian	Abilene Christian
2008	Abilene Christian	Abilene Christian	Midwestern State	Not sponsored	Central Oklahoma	Texas A&M–Kingsville	Cameron	Cameron	Abilene Christian
2009	Tarleton State; West Texas A&M; Texas A&M–Kingsville; Midwestern State	Abilene Christian	Midwestern State; West Texas A&M	Not sponsored	Midwestern State	Abilene Christian	Northeastern State	Abilene Christian	Abilene Christian
2010	Abilene Christian	Abilene Christian	Midwestern State	Not sponsored	Midwestern State	Abilene Christian	Abilene Christian	Abilene Christian	Abilene Christian
2011	Midwestern State	Eastern New Mexico	Eastern New Mexico	Not sponsored	Central Oklahoma	Southeastern Oklahoma State	Central Oklahoma	Abilene Christian	Abilene Christian
2012	Midwestern State; West Texas A&M	Eastern New Mexico	Incarnate Word	Not sponsored	Midwestern State; Tarleton State	Angelo State	Cameron	Abilene Christian	Abilene Christian
2013	Eastern New Mexico; Tarleton State	West Texas A&M	St. Edward's; Texas A&M International (HC)	Abilene Christian	Midwestern State	Tarleton State	Midwestern State	Cameron; Midwestern State	Angelo State
2014	Texas A&M–Commerce	West Texas A&M	St. Edward's (HC)	West Texas A&M	Tarleton State; Midwestern State	Texas A&M–Kingsville	Cameron	N/A	Texas A&M–Kingsville
2015	Texas A&M–Commerce	West Texas A&M	St. Edward's (HC)	Texas A&M–Commerce	Tarleton State	Texas A&M–Kingsville; West Texas A&M	Cameron	N/A	Texas A&M–Commerce
2016	Texas A&M–Commerce	West Texas A&M	Midwestern State (HC)	Texas A&M–Commerce	UT Permian Basin	Angelo State	Cameron	N/A	Texas A&M Kingsville
2017	Midwestern State	West Texas A&M	Midwestern State (HC)	Texas A&M–Commerce	West Texas A&M	West Texas A&M	Midwestern State	Midwestern State	Angelo State
2018	Tarleton State	West Texas A&M	Midwestern State (HC)	West Texas A&M	West Texas A&M	Angelo State	Midwestern State	Midwestern State	Angelo State
2019	Tarleton State	West Texas A&M	St. Mary's	Angelo State	West Texas A&M	Season not finished	Season not finished	Season not finished	Season not finished
2020	Not Sponsored (COVID-19)	West Texas A&M	West Texas A&M	West Texas A&M	Lubbock Christian	West Texas A&M	Oklahoma Christian	UT Tyler	West Texas A&M
2021	Midwestern State	West Texas A&M	Midwestern State	West Texas A&M	Lubbock Christian	Angelo State	Midwestern State	Midwestern State	West Texas A&M
2022	Angelo State	West Texas A&M	St. Mary's	West Texas A&M	West Texas A&M	Angelo State	Oklahoma Christian	UT Tyler	West Texas A&M
2023	UT Permian Basin	West Texas A&M	Midwestern State	West Texas A&M	West Texas A&M	Lubbock Christian	DBU	UT Permian Basin; Midwestern State	West Texas A&M
2024	Angelo State	West Texas A&M	St. Mary's	West Texas A&M	DBU	Angelo State	Midwestern State	UT Tyler	West Texas A&M
2025	Central Washington	West Texas A&M	Midwestern State	West Texas A&M	DBU	UT Tyler	Cameron	Lubbock Christian	West Texas A&M

Note: (HC) denotes the Heartland Conference. In 2012–2013, the LSC stopped sponsoring Men's soccer. In 2016, 4 schools (Eastern New Mexico, Midwestern State, UT-Permian Basin, and West Texas A&M) joined the Heartland as affiliate members for Men's soccer. When the Heartland folded, most schools became non-football members of the LSC.

=== Women ===
Year	Cross country	Soccer	Volleyball	Indoor Track	Basketball	Golf	Softball	Tennis	Outdoor Track
1997	Abilene Christian	West Texas A&M	West Texas A&M	Not sponsored	West Texas A&M	Not sponsored	Southeastern Oklahoma State	Rained out	Abilene Christian
1998	Angelo State	Midwestern State	Cameron	Not sponsored	Abilene Christian	Southwestern Oklahoma State	Central Oklahoma	Central Oklahoma	Abilene Christian
1999	Harding	Texas A&M–Commerce	West Texas A&M	Not sponsored	Abilene Christian	Northeastern State	Southeastern Oklahoma State	Rained out	Rained out
2000	Central Oklahoma	Central Oklahoma	West Texas A&M	Not sponsored	Texas A&M–Kingsville	Northeastern State	Southeastern Oklahoma State	Abilene Christian	Abilene Christian
2001	Abilene Christian	West Texas A&M	West Texas A&M	Not sponsored	Midwestern State	Cameron	Southeastern Oklahoma State	Northeastern State	Abilene Christian
2002	Abilene Christian	Central Oklahoma	West Texas A&M	Not sponsored	Angelo State	Northeastern State	Texas A&M–Kingsville	Abilene Christian	Abilene Christian
2003	Abilene Christian	West Texas A&M	West Texas A&M	Not sponsored	Northeastern State	Tarleton State	Angelo State	Northeastern State	Abilene Christian
2004	Abilene Christian	Texas A&M–Commerce	Abilene Christian	Not sponsored	Angelo State	Central Oklahoma	Angelo State	Abilene Christian	Angelo State
2005	Abilene Christian	Central Oklahoma	Abilene Christian	Not sponsored	Angelo State	Central Oklahoma	Central Oklahoma	Abilene Christian	Angelo State
2006	Abilene Christian	Central Oklahoma	West Texas A&M	Not sponsored	West Texas A&M	Northeastern State	Midwestern State	Abilene Christian	Abilene Christian
2007	Abilene Christian	West Texas A&M	West Texas A&M	Not sponsored	Texas A&M–Commerce	Cameron	Midwestern State	Northeastern State	Abilene Christian
2008	Midwestern State	Midwestern State	Midwestern State	Not sponsored	West Texas A&M	Tarleton State	Angelo State	Abilene Christian	Abilene Christian
2009	Midwestern State	Central Oklahoma	West Texas A&M	Not sponsored	West Texas A&M	Tarleton State	Angelo State	Abilene Christian	Angelo State
2010	Midwestern State	Abilene Christian	West Texas A&M	Not sponsored	West Texas A&M	Tarleton State	Angelo State	Abilene Christian	Angelo State
2011	Midwestern State	Midwestern State	West Texas A&M	Not sponsored	Texas Woman's	Tarleton State	West Texas A&M	Abilene Christian	Angelo State
2012	West Texas A&M	West Texas A&M	Angelo State	Abilene Christian	Tarleton State	Tarleton State	Angelo State	Abilene Christian	Angelo State
2013	West Texas A&M	Angelo State; Midwestern State	West Texas A&M	West Texas A&M	Midwestern State; Abilene Christian	Tarleton State	Texas Woman's	Abilene Christian	Angelo State
2014	Midwestern State	Texas A&M–Commerce	West Texas A&M	West Texas A&M	West Texas A&M	Midwestern State	West Texas A&M	Midwestern State	Angelo State
2015	Tarleton State	Angelo State	Tarleton State	West Texas A&M	West Texas A&M	Midwestern State	West Texas A&M	Midwestern State	Angelo State
2016	Midwestern State	Texas A&M–Commerce; West Texas A&M	Angelo State	West Texas A&M	Eastern New Mexico; Angelo State	Tarleton State	Angelo State	Cameron	West Texas A&M
2017	Tarleton State	Angelo State	Tarleton State	West Texas A&M	Angelo State; West Texas A&M	Tarleton State	Angelo State	Midwestern State	Angelo State
2018	Midwestern State	West Texas A&M	Tarleton State	West Texas A&M	West Texas A&M; Angelo State	West Texas A&M	Texas A&M–Kingsville	Midwestern State	Angelo State
2019	Lubbock Christian	Dallas Baptist	Angelo State; Arkansas-Fort Smith	West Texas A&M	Texas A&M–Commerce	Season not finished	Season not finished	Season not finished	Season not finished
2020	West Texas A&M	Angelo State	Angelo State	West Texas A&M	Lubbock Christian	Dallas Baptist	UT Tyler	UT Tyler	West Texas A&M
2021	Dallas Baptist	Dallas Baptist	Angelo State	West Texas A&M	West Texas A&M	Dallas Baptist	UT Tyler	Angelo State; Cameron; St. Mary's	West Texas A&M
2022	DBU	DBU	West Texas A&M	West Texas A&M	Texas Women's	West Texas A&M	UT Tyler	Cameron	West Texas A&M
2023	West Texas A&M	DBU	West Texas A&M; DBU	West Texas A&M	Texas Woman's	DBU	West Texas A&M; UT Tyler	Midwestern State	West Texas A&M
2024	West Texas A&M	Angelo State	West Texas A&M	West Texas A&M	Texas Woman's; Lubbock Christian	DBU	West Texas A&M; UT Tyler	St. Mary's; Midwestern State	West Texas A&M
2025	West Texas A&M	DBU	Angelo State; Lubbock Christian	West Texas A&M	Texas Woman's	St. Mary's	West Texas A&M	UT Tyler	West Texas A&M

=== Conference tournament champions ===
Year	Volleyball	Women's soccer	Men's soccer	Men's basketball	Women's basketball	Baseball	Softball	STUNT
2012–13	West Texas A&M	West Texas A&M	Incarnate Word	Midwestern State	Tarleton State	Angelo State	Incarnate Word	
2013–14	West Texas A&M	Midwestern State	No Tournament (HC)	Tarleton State	Midwestern State	Texas A&M–Kingsville	Texas Women's	
2014–15	Tarleton State	Texas A&M–Commerce	St. Edward's (HC)	Tarleton State	West Texas A&M	Tarleton State	Angelo State	
2015–16	Angelo State	Texas A&M–Commerce	St. Edwards (HC)	Texas A&M–Commerce	West Texas A&M	Angelo State	West Texas A&M	
2016–17	Angelo State	Midwestern State	St. Edward's (HC)	UT Permian Basin	Tarleton State	West Texas A&M	West Texas A&M	
2017–18	Tarleton State	West Texas A&M	Midwestern State (HC)	West Texas A&M	West Texas A&M	Tarleton State	Angelo State	
2018–19	Texas A&M–Commerce	Angelo State	West Texas A&M (HC)	West Texas A&M	West Texas A&M	West Texas A&M	Texas A&M–Kingsville	
2019–20	Angelo State	Dallas Baptist	Midwestern State	West Texas A&M	Lubbock Christian	Season Not Finished	Season Not Finished	
2020–21	Angelo State	Angelo State	West Texas A&M	West Texas A&M	Lubbock Christian	Angelo State	West Texas A&M	
2021–22	West Texas A&M	Angelo State	Midwestern State	West Texas A&M	West Texas A&M	Angelo State	Texas A&M Commerce	
2022–23	West Texas A&M	DBU	Midwestern State	West Texas A&M	Angelo State	Angelo State	UT Tyler	
2023–24	West Texas A&M	DBU	Midwestern State	Eastern New Mexico	Texas Woman's	Lubbock Christian	West Texas A&M	DBU
2024–25	Angelo State	Angelo State	Midwestern State	DBU	Texas Woman's	Angelo State	UT Tyler	DBU
2025-26	Angelo State	DBU	Midwestern State	DBU	Texas Woman's	UT Tyler	Angelo State	DBU

=== Division championships ===
From 1997 to 2011, and 2020–present, the LSC has been divided into divisions. From 1997 to 2011, the split was north–south. Beginning in the 2019–2020 academic year, the LSC was split into three nameless divisions among the non-football sports: West Texas and New Mexico in the western division; South Texas, Central Texas, and DFW in the central division; East Texas, North Texas, Oklahoma, and Arkansas in the eastern division. The divisional split was temporarily discontinued for the 2021–2022 season; but divisions were reintroduced for basketball for the 2022–23 season under the names East and West.

Year	Football	Volleyball	Men's Basketball	Women' Basketball	Baseball	Softball
1997–98	Central Oklahoma (North); Southwestern Oklahoma State (North); Texas A&M–Kingsville (South)	Texas Women's (North); West Texas A&M (South)	N/A	N/A	N/A	Southeastern Oklahoma State (North); Abilene Christian (South); Texas A&M–Kingsville
1998–99	Central Oklahoma (North); Texas A&M–Kingsville (South)	Cameron (North); West Texas A&M (South)	Central Oklahoma (North); West Texas A&M (South); Texas A&M–Commerce	Southeastern Oklahoma State (North); Southwestern Oklahoma State (North); Abilene Christian (South)	Southeastern Oklahoma State (North); Abilene Christian (South)	Southeastern Oklahoma State (North); Tarleton State (South)
1999–00	Southeastern Oklahoma State (North); Eastern New Mexico (South); Angelo State (South)	Cameron (North); West Texas A&M (South)	Northeastern State (North); West Texas A&M (South)	Southeastern Oklahoma State (North); East Central (North); Abilene Christian (South); West Texas A&M (South)	Southeastern Oklahoma State (North); Tarleton State (South)	Southeastern Oklahoma State (North); East Central (North); Tarleton State (South)
2000–01	Northeastern State (North); Eastern New Mexico (South); Angelo State (South)	Cameron (North); West Texas A&M (South)	Northeastern State (North); Midwestern State (South); West Texas A&M (South)	Southeastern Oklahoma State (North); Texas A&M–Kingsville (South)	Southeastern Oklahoma State (North); Abilene Christian (South)	Southeastern Oklahoma State (North); Tarleton State (South)
2001–02	Midwestern State (North); Tarleton State (South); Texas A&M–Kingsville (South)	Central Oklahoma (North); West Texas A&M (South)	Northeastern State (North); Angelo State (South)	Southeastern Oklahoma State (North); Midwestern State (North); Texas A&M–Kingsville (South); Angelo State (South)	Central Oklahoma (North); Abilene Christian (South)	Southeastern Oklahoma State (North); Eastern New Mexico (South)
2002–03	Tarleton State (North); Texas A&M–Kingsville (South); Abilene Christian (South)	Central Oklahoma (North); West Texas A&M (South)	Northeastern State (North); Tarleton State (South)	Cameron (North); Angelo State (South)	Central Oklahoma (North); Abilene Christian (South)	Southeastern Oklahoma State (North); Texas Women's (South)
2003–04	Tarleton State (North); Texas A&M–Kingsville (South)	Central Oklahoma (North); Cameron (North); Texas Women's (North); West Texas A&M (South)	Northeastern State (North); Tarleton State (North); Eastern New Mexico (South)	Northeastern State (North); Angelo State (South)	Central Oklahoma (North); Tarleton State (South)	Southeastern Oklahoma State (North); Angelo State (South); Tarleton State (South)
2004–05	Southeastern Oklahoma State (North); Central Oklahoma (North); Texas A&M–Kingsville (South); Midwestern State (South)	Cameron (North); Abilene Christian (South)	Tarleton State (North); Eastern New Mexico (South)	Northeastern State (North); West Texas A&M (South)	East Central (North); Southeastern Oklahoma State (North); Abilene Christian (South); Texas A&M–Kingsville (South)	Midwestern State (North); Angelo State (South)
2005–06	Southeastern Oklahoma State (North); West Texas A&M (South)	Central Oklahoma (North); Abilene Christian (South)	Central Oklahoma (North); Texas A&M–Commerce (South)	Northeastern State (North); Angelo State (South)	Central Oklahoma (North); Abilene Christian (South)	Central Oklahoma (North); Angelo State (South)
2006–07	Southeastern Oklahoma State (North); West Texas A&M (South); Tarleton State (South)	Cameron (North); West Texas A&M (South)	Southeastern Oklahoma State (North); Central Oklahoma (North); Tarleton State (South)	Southwestern Oklahoma State (North); West Texas A&M (South)	Central Oklahoma (North); Cameron (North); Angelo State (South)	Southeastern Oklahoma State (North); Midwestern State (South); Abilene Christian (South)
2007–08	Southwestern Oklahoma State (North); Texas A&M–Commerce (North); Southeastern Oklahoma State (North); Central Oklahoma (North); Northeastern State (North); West Texas A&M (South)	N/A	Southeastern Oklahoma State (North); Midwestern State (South); West Texas A&M (South)	Texas A&M–Commerce (North); West Texas A&M (South)	Central Oklahoma (North); Abilene Christian (South)	Midwestern State (North); Angelo State (South)
2008–09	Central Oklahoma (North); Abilene Christian (South)	N/A	Central Oklahoma (North); West Texas A&M (South)	Central Oklahoma (North); Northeastern State (North); West Texas A&M (South)	N/A	Southeastern Oklahoma State (North); Angelo State (South); Tarleton State (South)
2009–10	Texas A&M–Commerce (North); Tarleton State (South); West Texas A&M (South); Texas A&M–Kingsville (South); Midwestern State (South)	N/A	Central Oklahoma (North); Midwestern State (South)	Central Oklahoma (North); West Texas A&M (South)	N/A	Southeastern Oklahoma State (North); Abilene Christian (South)
2010–11	Northeastern State (North); East Central (North); Abilene Christian	N/A	Central Oklahoma (North); Midwestern State (South)	Northeastern State (North); West Texas A&M (South)	N/A	Midwestern State (North); West Texas A&M (South)
2011–12	N/A	N/A	Central Oklahoma (North); Tarleton State (South)	Northeastern State (North); Tarleton State (South)	N/A	Midwestern State (North); Angelo State (South); Incarnate Word (South)
2019–20	N/A	Angelo State; St. Edward's; Texas A&M–Commerce; Arkansas–Fort Smith	West Texas A&M; St. Edward's; Texas A&M Commerce	West Texas A&M; Texas A&M–Commerce; Tarleton St. St. Mary's	N/A	N/A
2020–21	N/A	UT Tyler; Arkansas–Fort Smith; Texas A&M–Kingsville; Angelo State	Dallas Baptist; Texas A&M–Kingsville; Lubbock Christian	Texas A&M–Commerce; Texas A&M International; Lubbock Christian	N/A	N/A
2021–22	N/A	N/A	N/A	N/A	N/A	N/A
2022–23	N/A	N/A	Texas A&M Kingsville; St. Edward's; West Texas A&M	Texas Women's; Angelo State; Lubbock Christian	N/A	N/A
2022–23	N/A	N/A	DBU; West Texas A&M	-	N/A	N/A

2014-2015
In the 2014 season, a conference playoff was added due to the small number of football programs in the conference. At the end of the season, the teams were guaranteed two more conference games in the Lone Star Conference playoffs, the teams were split into two separate brackets, the championship bracket (seeds 1–4) and the non-championship bracket (seeds 5–7). This format ended after the 2015 season due to the addition of Western New Mexico, UT Permian Basin, and Oklahoma Panhandle State.

Year	Regular-season champion	Playoff champion
2014	Texas A&M–Commerce (conference: 6–1) (overall: 9–3)	Angelo State (conference: 5–2) (overall: 9–3)
2015	Texas A&M–Commerce (conference: 6–0) (overall: 8–4)	Midwestern State (conference: 5–1) (overall: 10–2)

== Notable athletes ==
Abilene Christian University

- James Browne, Olympic long jumper from Antigua
- Danieal Manning, NFL safety and kickoff returner
- Bobby Morrow, sprinter, won gold medals in the 100 meters, 200, and 4 × 100 meters relay at the 1956 Summer Olympics
- Wilbert Montgomery, former NFL running back and current running backs coach of the Baltimore Ravens
- Billy Olson, pole vaulter, set 11 indoor world records in the 1980s and was the first to clear 19 feet indoors
- John "Bradshaw" Layfield, two time All-Lone Star Conference lineman & member of the WWE Hall of Fame
- Ove Johansson, Swedish-born NFL placekicker, world-record holder for the longest field goal in organized football (69 yards)
- Bernard Scott, NFL running back for the Cincinnati Bengals
- Johnny Knox, NFL wide receiver for the Chicago Bears
- Earl Young, sprinter, won gold medal in the 4 × 400 meters relay at the 1960 Summer Olympics

Angelo State University

- Alvin Garrett, former NFL wide receiver
- Tranel Hawkins, hurdler, placed 6th in the 400 meters hurdles at the 1984 Summer Olympics
- Pierce Holt, former Pro Bowl NFL defensive end
- Jim Morris, former relief pitcher for the Tampa Bay Devil Rays, inspiration for the film The Rookie
- Grant Teaff, College Football Hall of Fame coach, coached 21 seasons at Baylor
- Clayton Weishuhn, former NFL linebacker
- Charlie West, former NFL safety

Cameron University

- Jason Christiansen, former Major League Baseball pitcher
- John Brandes, former NFL tight end and long snapper
- Mark Cotney, former NFL safety
- Avery Johnson, former NBA point guard and former Brooklyn Nets head coach

University of Central Oklahoma

- Keith Traylor, former NFL nose tackle

East Texas A&M University (formerly Texas A&M University–Commerce)

- Wade Wilson, former NFL quarterback and current NFL quarterbacks coach for the Dallas Cowboys
- Harvey Martin, former All-Pro NFL defensive end and member of the NFL 1970s All-Decade Team
- Dwight White, former Pro Bowl NFL defensive end and member of the Pittsburgh Steelers' Steel Curtain defensive line
- Kevin Mathis, former NFL cornerback
- Derrick Crawford, former Arena Football League defensive lineman
- Allen Roulette, NFL- Buffalo Bills and AFL- Albany Firebirds, New Orleans Knights, Dallas Texas, Tampa Bay Storm
- Luis Perez, 2017 Harlon Hill Trophy winner and current quarterback for the New York Guardians. Previously also signed with the Birmingham Iron, Philadelphia Eagles, Detroit Lions and Los Angeles Rams
- Will Cureton, starting quarterback for the 1972 NAIA National Championship-winning Lions. Played for two seasons for the Cleveland Browns
- John Carlos, Olympic Medalist. Famed for raising his fist in protest during the medal ceremony following the Men's 200m run in the 1968 Summer Olympics
- Clint Dolezel, former Arena Football player for the Milwaukee Mustangs (1994–2001), Houston Thunderbears, Grand Rapids Rampage, Las Vegas Gladiators and Dallas Desperados. Won 3 Arena Bowl Championships combined as a player and later coach.

Eastern New Mexico University

- Mike Sinclair, former Pro Bowl NFL defensive end, current Chicago Bears defensive line coach

Midwestern State University

- Marqui Christian, current NFL strong safety for the Los Angeles Rams.
- Dominic Rhodes, former NFL running back, later running back for the Virginia Destroyers of the United Football League
- Amini Silatolu, NFL guard for the Carolina Panthers
- Bryan Gilmore, former NFL wide receiver
- Will Pettis, former Arena Football League wide receiver and defensive back, two-time AFL Ironman of the Year
- Daniel Woolard, Major League Soccer defender for D.C. United

Tarleton State University

- Richard Bartel, NFL quarterback for the Arizona Cardinals
- James Dearth, former NFL long snapper and tight end
- Brandon Lee, American Basketball Association point guard/shooting guard for the North Dallas Vandals
- Derrick Ross, former NFL running back, later Arena Football League running back for the Philadelphia Soul

Texas A&M University–Kingsville

- Roberto Garza, NFL center/guard for the Chicago Bears
- Darrell Green, former Hall of Fame NFL cornerback who played a record 20 seasons with the Washington Redskins
- Al Harris, former All-Pro NFL cornerback
- Jermaine Mayberry, former NFL offensive tackle/guard
- Gene Upshaw, former Hall of Fame NFL guard and longtime executive director of the NFLPA
- Dwayne Nix, football tight end, member of the College Football Hall of Fame

Texas Woman's University

- Louise Ritter high jumper, won gold medal in the high jump at the 1988 Summer Olympics

West Texas A&M University

- John Ayers, former NFL All-Pro offensive lineman, two Super Bowl rings
- Carl Birdsong, former NFL Pro Bowl punter
- Tully Blanchard, former professional wrestler and current wrestling manager; inducted into the WWE Hall of Fame as a member of the Four Horsemen stable
- Maurice Cheeks, former NBA All-Star point guard, 1 NBA Championship, former 76ers head coach, current Oklahoma City Thunder assistant coach
- Ted DiBiase (Sr.), former professional wrestler and member of the WWE Hall of Fame
- Manny Fernandez, professional wrestler in numerous independent promotions
- Dory Funk Jr., former professional wrestler and current wrestling trainer, also a WWE Hall of Fame member
- Terry Funk, brother of Dory; semiretired professional wrestler, famous as a pioneer of hardcore wrestling and also a WWE Hall of Fame member
- Brittan Golden, NFL receiver
- Frank Goodish, better known as Bruiser Brody, late professional wrestler and one of the industry's most famous brawlers
- Stan Hansen, former professional wrestler most famous for his career in All Japan Pro Wrestling, also a WWE Hall of Fame member
- Alondra Johnson, former All-Star CFL linebacker and member of the Canadian Football Hall of Fame
- Steve Kragthorpe, former quarterback and college football head coach, current quarterbacks coach for LSU
- Kareem Larrimore, former NFL and Arena Football League defensive back
- Jerry Logan, former Pro Bowl NFL safety, one Super Bowl ring
- Reggie McElroy, former NFL offensive lineman.
- Mercury Morris, former All-Pro NFL running back, 3X Pro Bowlwe, 2 Super Bowl rings
- Keith Null, free agent NFL quarterback
- Khiry Robinson, NFL running back for the New Orleans Saints
- Virgil Runnels, better known as Dusty Rhodes, late professional wrestler and member of the WWE Hall of Fame
- Merced Solis, semi-retired professional wrestler best known as Tito Santana and member of the WWE Hall of Fame
- Duane Thomas, former NFL running back that won a Super Bowl ring with the Dallas Cowboys at Super Bowl VI
- John Varnell, left the Los Angeles Rams before the 1966 season for the Toronto Argonauts of the CFL, Inductee Who's Who of American Educators
- Chaun Thompson, former NFL linebacker
- Barry Windham, semiretired professional wrestler and member of the WWE Hall of Fame as a part of the Four Horsemen
