= GCR =

GCR (or GCRS) may refer to:

== Science ==
- Galactic cosmic ray, a cosmic ray from outside the Solar System
- Geocentric Celestial Reference System, a coordinate system for near-Earth objects like satellites
- Geological Conservation Review, a procedure of the British Joint Nature Conservation Committee
- Global catastrophic risk, a potential catastrophe that would affect the whole world
- Global Competitiveness Report, a yearly report published by the World Economic Forum
- Glucocorticoid receptor, a cell protein which responds to glucocorticoid compounds

== Technology ==
- Gas-cooled reactor, a type of nuclear reactor
- Ghost-canceling reference, a television subsignal
- Grey component replacement, substitution of black ink for gray ink in color printing
- Group coded recording, a technique for encoding digital data on magnetic tape or disk

== Transportation ==
- GCR, ICAO code for Tianjin Airlines, China
- GCR, stock symbol for Gaylord Container Corporation, an American packing material manufacturer
- Great Central Railway, a British railway company
  - Great Central Railway (heritage railway)
  - Great Central Railway (Nottingham)

== Other uses ==
- Glass City Rollers, an American roller derby league
- Graduate Common Room, a Common Room (university) for postgraduate students
- Global Corruption Report by Transparency International
- Gray City Rebels, a Brazilian roller derby league
- Green Corn Revival, an American band
- gcr, ISO 639-3 code for the French Guianese Creole language
- Groupe Communiste Révolutionnaire (Revolutionary Communist Group (Lebanon)), a Lebanese Trotskyist group
