= Southwestern Oklahoma State Bulldogs =

- University: Southwestern Oklahoma State University
- Conference: Great American Conference
- NCAA: Division II
- Athletic director: Todd Helton
- Location: Weatherford, Oklahoma
- Varsity teams: 10
- Football stadium: Milam Stadium
- Basketball arena: Pioneer Cellular Event Center
- Baseball stadium: SWOSU Athletic Complex
- Soccer stadium: SWOSU Athletic Complex
- Other venues: Rankin Williams Fieldhouse
- Nickname: Bulldogs
- Colors: Navy blue and white
- Website: swosuathletics.com

The Southwestern Oklahoma State Bulldogs (also SWOSU Bulldogs) are the athletic teams that represent Southwestern Oklahoma State University, located in Weatherford, Oklahoma, in NCAA Division II intercollegiate sports. The Bulldogs compete as members of the Great American Conference for all 10 varsity sports.

== Sports sponsored ==
Men's sports	Women's sports
Baseball	Basketball
Basketball	Cross country
Football	Golf
Golf	Rodeo
Rodeo	Soccer
	Softball
	Volleyball
	Track & Field

== National Championships ==
SWOSU has won national championship titles in women’s basketball (1982, 1983, 1985, 1987, 1990), football (1996), men's rodeo (1985, 1992, 1993, 1999) and women's rodeo (1998, 1994). And the SWOSU baseball team were runners-up for the national championship in the NAIA World Series (1958). SWOSU was N.A.I.A. Division One National Champion in football in 1996 and National Runner-up in 1977.

== Alumni ==
- Carl Birdsong, former NFL punter
- Ray Burris, former MLB pitcher
- Shane Drury, former PRCA bullrider
- Gordon Gore, NFL player
- V'Keon Lacey, American football player
- Grady Lewis, former NBA player
- Cord McCoy, PBR bullrider and runner-up on The Amazing Race
- Rex Ryan, former head coach for the Buffalo Bills
- Rob Ryan, former defensive assistant for the Buffalo Bills
- Arnie Shockley, former professional football player
- Jim Simmons, NFL player
- Rocky Walcher, former PGA Tour golfer
- Keith Richardson Jr, Collegiate Basketball Coach D-1,D-2,Juco
