= Jim Simmons (American football) =

American football player (1903–1977)

No. 8, 4
- Position: Back

Personal information
- Born: April 3, 1903; Sentinel, Oklahoma, U.S.
- Died: January 16, 1977 (aged 73); Elmore City, Oklahoma, U.S.
- Listed height: 6 ft 0 in (1.83 m)
- Listed weight: 186 lb (84 kg)

Career information
- High school: Sentinel (OK)
- College: Southwestern Oklahoma State

Career history
- Cleveland Bulldogs (1927); Providence Steam Roller (1928)

Awards and highlights
- NFL champion (1928)
- Stats at Pro Football Reference

James Ellington "Jenks" Simmons (April 3, 1903 – January 16, 1977) was an American professional football back who played two seasons in the National Football League (NFL) with the Cleveland Bulldogs and Providence Steam Roller. He played college football at Southwestern Oklahoma State University.

== Early life ==
Simmons attended Sentinel High School in Sentinel, Oklahoma.

== College career ==
Simmons participated in football, basketball, track and baseball for the Southwestern Oklahoma State Bulldogs. He made a half-court shot at the buzzer to beat rival Phillips for the conference title in basketball. He was inducted into the Southwestern Oklahoma State Athletic Hall of Fame in 1963.

== Professional career ==
Simmons played in twelve games, starting six, for the NFL's Cleveland Bulldogs in 1927. He played in eight games, starting four, for the Providence Steam Roller of the NFL during the 1928 season.

== Coaching career ==
Simmons coached basketball at Northeastern State University for seven years. He later coached basketball at El Reno High School, winning the state championship in 1932, 1933, 1946, 1949 and 1953. His 1933 and 1949 teams were undefeated.
