= Perry Jackson =

American football player (1903–1988)

Profile
- Positions: End, halfback, tackle

Personal information
- Born: April 24, 1905; Oklahoma, U.S.
- Died: June 22, 1973 (aged 68); Houston, Texas, U.S.
- Listed height: 6 ft 1 in (1.85 m)
- Listed weight: 202 lb (92 kg)

Career information
- High school: Mountain View (Mountain View, Oklahoma)
- College: Southwestern Oklahoma State

Career history
- Providence Steam Roller (1928–1930)
- Stats at Pro Football Reference

Jesse Perry Jackson (April 24, 1905 – June 22, 1973) was an American professional football player who spent three seasons in the National Football League (NFL) with the Providence Steam Roller, from 1928 to 1930. Jackson won an NFL championship in 1928 with Providence.

== Right name, wrong player? ==
According to an article by the Professional Football Researchers Association, Jackson played for the Boston Bulldogs in 1929. However, he was listed as a player on the field named "Arnie Shockley". Jackson, a teammate of Arnie Shockley's from Southwestern Oklahoma State University, used Archie's invitation to try out for Boston. According to Jackson, he was disappointed when he didn't receive an invitation to try out for any professional team after playing college football. However, Arnie Shockley did receive an invitation to try out for the Bulldogs. Shockley decided not to go, and Jackson saw this as an opportunity to try out for a pro team. He went to the camp, assumed the name of his teammate Shockley, and made the team, playing that year under the alias "Arnold Shockley".

The only problem with his story is that Jackson was supposedly playing for the Providence Steam Roller from 1928 to 1930. However, the biography on Arnold Shockley for the SWOSU Hall of Fame states that he played for Providence for four seasons. Also the stats for Perry and Shockley appear to be same. This sets up a controversy to determine which teams Shockley and Perry each respectively played for, especially since Perry is credited with winning an NFL title in 1928. In trying to clear up the mistake in identity of the players, Bob Carroll, also of PFRA, states that the real Jackson, under the alias Shockley, played for Providence, while Shockley, using Jackson's name, played for the Bulldogs.
