= Hibler =

Hibler is a surname. Notable people with the surname include:

- Joe Anna Hibler (born 1939), American educator
- Mike Hibler (born 1946), American football player
- Winston Hibler (1910–1976), American screenwriter, film producer, director, and narrator
