= Gordon Gore =

American football player (1913–1987)

No. 11, 10
- Position: Halfback

Personal information
- Born: June 28, 1913; Clinton, Oklahoma, U.S.
- Died: January 21, 1987 (aged 73); Frederick, Oklahoma, U.S.
- Listed height: 6 ft 0 in (1.83 m)
- Listed weight: 215 lb (98 kg)

Career information
- High school: Hominy (OK)
- College: Southwestern Oklahoma State
- NFL draft: 1936: undrafted

Career history
- Los Angeles Bulldogs (1936–1938); Detroit Lions (1939)
- Stats at Pro Football Reference

Winfield Gordon Gore (June 28, 1913 – January 21, 1987) was an American football halfback. He played four seasons professionally, three with the Los Angeles Bulldogs and one with the Detroit Lions of the National Football League (NFL). He played college football at Southwestern Oklahoma State University and attended Hominy High School in Hominy, Oklahoma. Gore was named to the inaugural Pro All-Star Game in January 1939. He is sometimes referred to as "Wilfred Gore".
