= Northwestern Oklahoma State University =

Public university in Alva, Oklahoma, U.S.

Coordinates: 36.79595°N 98.66834°W

- Former names: Northwestern Territorial Normal School (1897–1919); Northwestern Oklahoma Teachers College (1919–1939); Northwestern State College (1939–1974)
- Motto: Learn Today, Lead Tomorrow
- Type: Public university
- Established: 1897; 129 years ago
- Parent institution: Regional University System of Oklahoma
- President: Bo Hannaford
- Students: 1,789 (2021)
- Location: Alva, Oklahoma, United States
- Campus: Main campus – Alva Satellite campuses: Enid; Woodward
- Colors: Red and black
- Nickname: Rangers
- Sporting affiliations: NCAA Division II – Great American
- Mascot: Rowdy Ranger
- Website: nwosu.edu
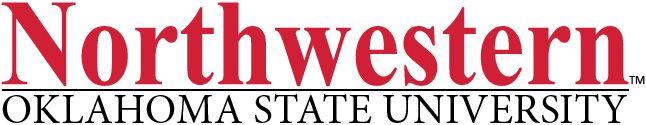

Northwestern Oklahoma State University (NWOSU) is a public university in Alva, Oklahoma, with satellite campuses in Enid and Woodward. It offers both bachelor's and master's degrees.

== History ==
In 1897, a normal school, or school for teachers, was established in Alva by an act of the Oklahoma Territorial Legislature. It was the second normal school in Oklahoma, charged with preparing teachers to serve the many one-room schoolhouses that covered the prairie. It was called the "Northwestern Territorial Normal School". The new school's faculty consisted of the school's first president, James E. Ament, and two teachers. Classes were held in the Congregational Church until construction of the first building, the "Castle on the Hill", was complete on September 20, 1897.

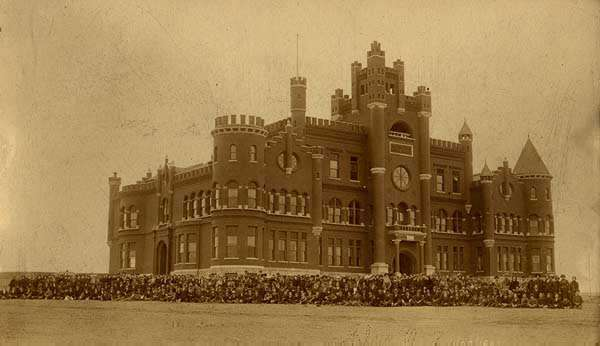
The "Castle on the Hill", 1901

In 1902 biology department head, Professor G.W. Stevens, established The Museum of Natural History at the school. The museum contains a large collection of biological specimens native to Oklahoma, as well as hundreds of Alaskan mammal and bird specimens collected by Stevens during a seven-month trip in 1908. The museum was closed from January 1975 to September 3, 1997, opening after extensive restoration efforts were performed. The museum is located on the second floor of the Jesse Dunn Building, and is the second oldest museum in Oklahoma.

The school became a four-year teachers college in 1919 and changed its name to "Northwestern Oklahoma Teachers College". The school expanded in 1939 to include degrees in liberal arts as well as education, and its name changed again, to "Northwestern State College". The final name change occurred in 1974 when the school was given its present name.

Northwestern's greatest tragedy happened on March 1, 1935, when the Castle on the Hill was destroyed by fire. In 1948, a contest was organized to adopt a new school fight song and a new alma mater. The winning submissions were announced in March 1949. Both were made by Floyd McClain, a 1940 graduate of Northwestern who was then attending the Boston Conservatory of Music. The new fight song was entitled "Ride, Rangers, Ride", and the new alma mater was entitled "Oh Northwestern". They are still the official fight song and alma mater, although band directors have altered the arrangements over the years. In 1957, a contest was launched to select a motto for the university. The motto chosen was "Learn Today, Lead Tomorrow", submitted by Kay Hutcheson, a junior student at Northwestern.

In 1951, the Oklahoma State Regents for Higher Education authorized Northwestern to offer courses, transferable to the University of Oklahoma or Oklahoma State University, applying toward a master's degree in education. In 1954, the board approved a program leading to a master of education degree at Northwestern.

In the fall of 1978 Northwestern implemented a program leading to a master of behavioral science degree. A nursing degree program was established in the fall of 1981 to respond to the nursing shortage in northwest Oklahoma. The Oklahoma Legislature passed legislation that created two new branch campuses at Enid and Woodward. Northwestern became one of the first institutions to establish a bachelor of e-commerce degree in the fall of 2000.

More than 100 years have passed since Northwestern Oklahoma State University opened its doors. Since then, it has progressed from a normal school offering only teaching certificates to an institution offering degrees at the bachelor's and master's levels. The 1897 campus of 40 acres (16 ha) without buildings in one town has now become more than 400 acres (160 ha) and 36 buildings located in three communities. The three faculty members and 68 students have increased to more than 220 faculty and staff members and more than 2,300 students.

== Academics ==
Undergraduate demographics as of Fall 2023
Race and ethnicity	Total
White	60%
Hispanic	16%
American Indian/Alaska Native	8%
Black	8%
Two or more races	3%
International student	2%
Unknown	2%
Asian	1%
Economic diversity
Low-income (Note: The percentage of students who received an income-based federal Pell grant intended for low-income students.)	46%
Affluent (Note: The percentage of students who are a part of the American middle class at the bare minimum.)	54%

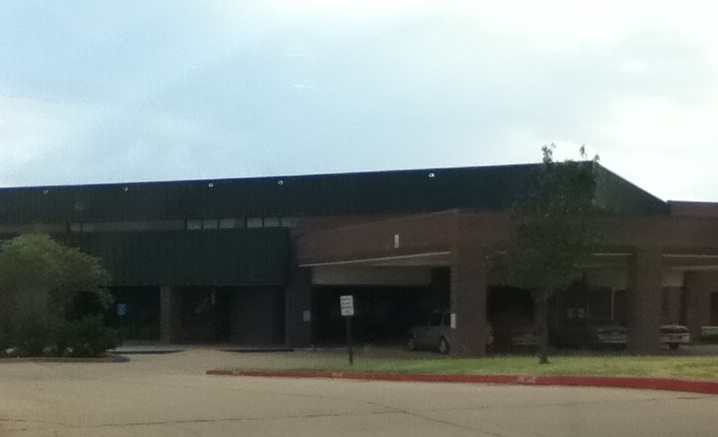
NWOSU building in Enid

Northwestern offers Bachelor of Arts degrees and Bachelor of Science degrees in more than 40 areas of study. The university's academic programs are set up in two schools—the School of Arts and Sciences and the School of Professional Studies.

== Athletics ==
The Northwestern Oklahoma State (NWOSU) athletic teams are called the Rangers. The university is a member of the Division II ranks of the National Collegiate Athletic Association (NCAA), primarily competing in the Great American Conference (GAC) since the 2012–13 academic year as a provisional member (achieving D-II full member status in 2015–16). The Rangers previously competed in the Sooner Athletic Conference of the National Association of Intercollegiate Athletics (NAIA) from 2001–02 to 2011–12; in the Red River Athletic Conference (RRAC) from 1998–99 to 2000–01; as an NAIA Independent during the 1997–98 school year; and in the Oklahoma Intercollegiate Conference (OIC) from 1974–75 to 1996–97.

NWOSU competes in 16 intercollegiate varsity teams: Men's sports include baseball, basketball, cheerleading, cross country, football, golf and rodeo; while women's sports include basketball, cheerleading, cross country, golf, rodeo, soccer, softball and volleyball.

=== Move to NCAA Division II ===
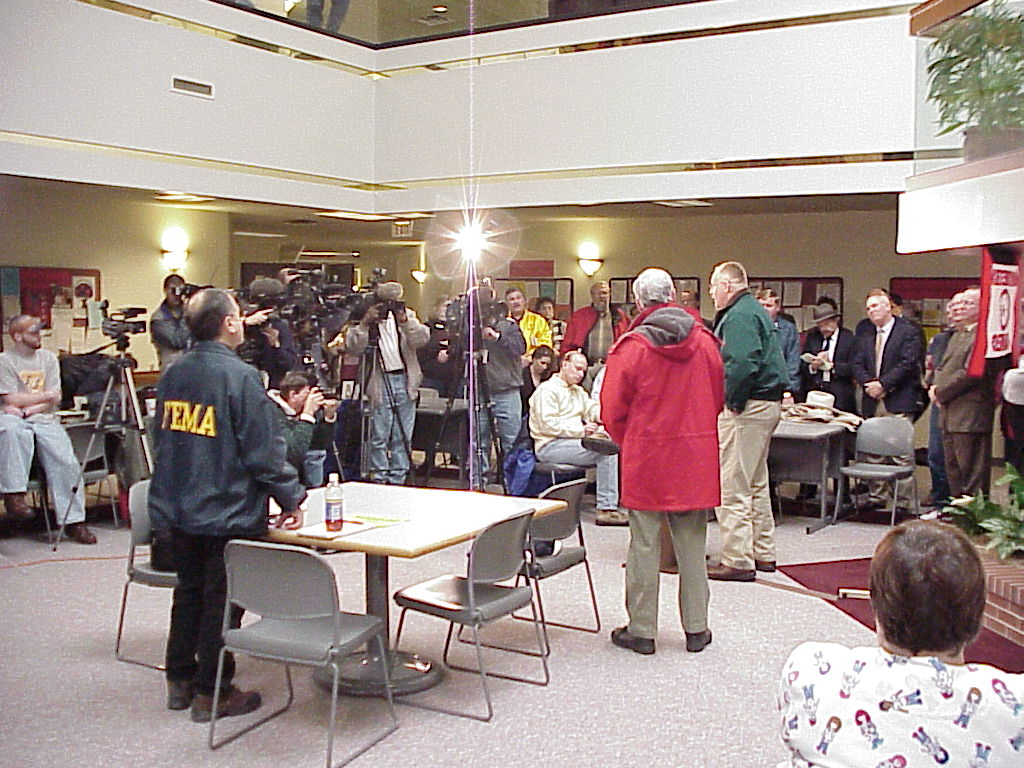
During the 2002 Oklahoma Ice Storm, NWOSU Enid served as a Red Cross shelter

On May 11, 2011, Northwestern Oklahoma State announced that they had accepted an invitation to the Great American Conference for all sports in the 2012–13 academic year and would begin their transition from the NAIA to NCAA Division II. On July 12, 2011, Northwestern Oklahoma State University was denied admittance into the NCAA Division II Membership Process for the 2011–12 cycle; the school was accepted one year later.

Schools must complete a membership process, spanning 3 years, before gaining active status and becoming eligible for championship competition. On July 17, 2015, the NCAA announced that effective September 1, 2015, the school had become active Division II members.

== Notable alumni ==
- Mike Adenuga, entrepreneur and philanthropist
- Tim Albin, college football coach
- Odie Armstrong, professional football player
- Vaughn Ary, United States Marine Corps lawyer
- Patrick Crayton, professional football player
- John B. Doolin, judge
- Stockton Graves, professional rodeo steer wrestler and college rodeo coach
- Mike Hargrove, professional baseball player and manager
- Samuel W. Hayes, judge
- Joe L. Heaton, judge
- Greg Johnson (American football coach), college football coach
- Ronnie Jones (American football), professional and college football coach
- Lewis Kamas, politician
- Harold Keith, author
- A. DeWade Langley, law enforcement officer
- Ron Moore, professional football player
- Chip Myers, professional football player
- Gaylon Nickerson, professional basketball player
- Harvey Harlow Nininger, meteoriticist
- Lynn Scott, professional football player
- Brian Sochia, professional football player
- Bill Overstreet, politician
- Mark Steffen, politician
- Mike Silva, college baseball coach
- Louis Wilke, college football coach
