= Stockton Graves =

Rodeo cowboy

Stockton Graves (born December 5, 1978) is a Professional Rodeo Cowboy Association (PRCA) noted steer wrestler who won the RAM National Circuit Finals Rodeo in 2006.

== Early life ==
Stockton Graves was born on December 5, 1978. He grew up in Kildare, Oklahoma and went to high school in Ponca City, Oklahoma, where he competed on the high school wrestling team. After his high school graduation, Graves attended Northwestern Oklahoma State University in Alva, Oklahoma from 1997 - 2002. He was a steer wrestler on the school rodeo team, qualifying for the National Intercollegiate Rodeo Association College National Finals Rodeo three times. His time of 3.4 seconds set the steer wrestling record at the College National Finals.

== Career ==
Graves joined the PRCA in 1997. He won the RAM National Circuit Finals Rodeo in 2006.

In 2011, Graves became the head rodeo coach for his alma mater, Northwestern Oklahoma State University. His new coaching responsibilities meant Graves could no longer compete professionally year-round. He joined the PRCA circuit system, competing in the Prairie Circuit. Under this system, competitors participate in a limited number of events within their circuit. The top money winner for the circuit and the winner of the circuit championship advance to the National Circuit Finals Rodeo.
