= Green Corn Revival =

American band

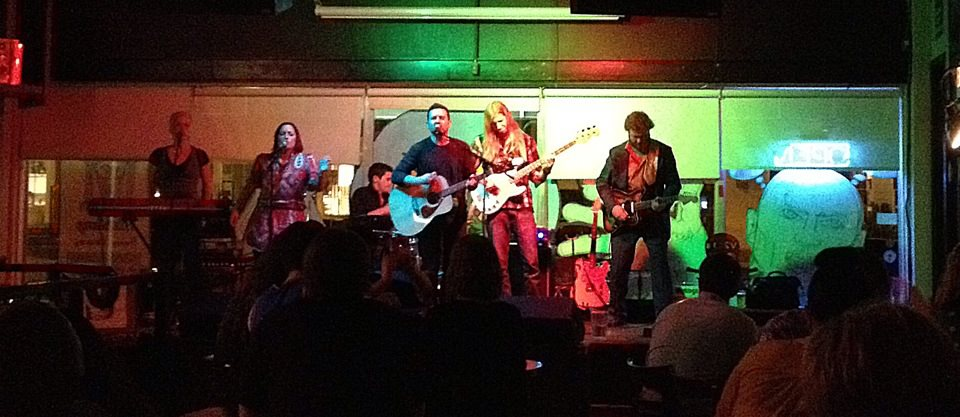
- Green Corn Revival performing at VZD's Restaurant and Club, Oklahoma City, on November 3, 2012.

Background information
- Origin: Weatherford, Oklahoma
- Genre: Cowpunk
- Years active: 2009 - 2015
- Label: Unsigned
- Past members: Cora Brinkley-Gutel; Brett Burrows; Kyle Burrows; Brandon Cink; Caleb Creed; Jared Deck; Jacy Deck; Kenny Holloway; Ryan Houck; Natalie Houck; Miles Johnson; Tyler Paul; Clayton Roffey; Stephen Rozzell; Drew Simmons
- Website: greencornrevival.com

Green Corn Revival (often abbreviated GCR) was an American rock band from Weatherford, Oklahoma.

== History ==
=== Formation and The Oklahoma EP (2009–2010) ===
Green Corn Revival was first formed in early 2009 by singer/songwriter Jared Deck. After disbanding his previous project, alternative rock band The Voice Of, Deck and drummer Kenny Holloway began writing and arranging the songs that would become the genesis of Green Corn Revival. The pair were soon joined by The Voice Of bassist Ryan Houck, and the three would become the core of GCR's earliest lineup, which also included Houck's wife Natalie as vocalist, keyboardist Caleb Creed and lead guitarist Kyle Burrows. This lineup would release the three-song Oklahoma EP in August 2009. By February 2010, Burrows had left the band, replaced by Stephen Rozzell. The lineup also added bassist Miles Johnson, allowing Ryan Houck to move to dobro, banjo, and pedal steel.

=== Say You're A Sinner (2010–2012) ===
The band was invited to take part in rockabilly legend Wanda Jackson's showcase at SXSW 2010, providing significant exposure for the new band. Green Corn Revival released their first full-length album, Say You're a Sinner, later in 2010 to positive reviews. Soon after the album was completed, the band's lineup again changed, with Tyler Paul replacing Kenny Holloway on drums and Jacy Deck replacing Caleb Creed on keyboards. Green Corn Revival's relationship with Wanda Jackson continued after Say You're a Sinner, with the band backing her for a sold out album release party in Oklahoma City in January 2011. The band continued to gain recognition around the Southwest, opening for Eve 6's reunion appearance at SWOSUPalooza in April 2011. Jared and Jacy Deck married in the summer of 2011, becoming the second married couple to be part of the band. The band's lineup changed again later that year, with Holloway returning after Paul's departure to join country band Loomis Road and new bassist Brandon Cink, who had previously played with Deck in a band in college, replacing Johnson. This new lineup played at the Access Music Festival in January 2012. The band performed for their second time at SXSW in 2012.

=== Bound For Glory (2012–2014) ===
In April 2012, Holloway and the Houcks decided to amicably part ways with Green Corn Revival and form Honeylark with former GCR keyboardist Caleb Creed. The band recruited vocalist Cora Brinkley-Gutel, bassist Clayton Roffey and drummer Drew Simmons to fill out the band's lineup. The band continued with live performances around Oklahoma as well as nationally, including playing the Norman Music Festival in 2013. The band's second full-length album, titled Bound For Glory, was released November 5, 2013. The album's first single, "Hard Timin' Monopolizin' Blues", received a music video, which featured Southwestern Oklahoma State University students and members of the Weatherford community. The band filled 2014 with live performances in support of the new album, including performing at the historic Cain's Ballroom in February, again sharing the bill with Wanda Jackson for OKC Fest in June, and performing at SWOSU's "Dawg Days" new student orientation in August.

=== Dissolution (2014–2015) ===
Green Corn Revival played their final show on September 5, 2014, for Live Music On The Canal in Oklahoma City. During the following months, frontman Jared Deck began performing solo shows around western Oklahoma. On March 14, 2015, a post on the official GCR Facebook page teased a "big announcement" coming the following week. Three days later, on St. Patrick's Day, Green Corn Revival announced on Facebook and the band's official site that they had decided to "retire Green Corn Revival and move in a different direction." Deck also announced his decision to pursue a solo career under his own name.

== Members ==
=== Former ===
- Jared Deck – lead vocals, guitar (2009–present)
- Jacy Deck – keyboard, backing vocals (2010–present)
- Cora Brinkley-Gutel - backing vocals (2012–present)
- Brett Burrows - guitar (2010-2011)
- Kyle Burrows - guitar (2009)
- Brandon Cink - bass guitar, lead guitar (2012–present)
- Caleb Creed - keyboard, trumpet (2009-2010)
- Kenny Holloway - drums (2009-2010, 2011-2012)
- Ryan Houck - lead guitar, banjo, pedal steel, dobro (2009–2012)
- Natalie Houck - lead vocals, backing vocals (2009–2012)
- Miles Johnson - bass guitar (2009–2012)
- Tyler Paul - drums(2010–2011)
- Clayton Roffey - bass guitar (2012–present)
- Stephen Rozzell - guitar (2010)
- Drew Simmons - drums(2012–present)

=== Featured Musicians ===
- Daniel Foulks - violin on "Bound For Glory"
- Kevin Webb - pedal steel on "Bound For Glory"

=== Occasional live players include ===
- Hector Lopez - bass guitar
- Drew Wilson - drums
- Reagan Nikkel - drums

== Discography ==
- The Oklahoma EP (2009)
- Say You're A Sinner (2010)
- Bound For Glory (2013)
