= SWOSUPalooza =

- Status: Active
- Genre: Live music
- Frequency: Annually
- Locations: Southwestern Oklahoma State University, Weatherford, Oklahoma, U.S.
- Years active: 26
- Inaugurated: April 13, 2000
- Founder: Chip Diffendaffer
- Most recent: March 25, 2021

SWOSUPalooza is an annual concert on the Weatherford campus of Southwestern Oklahoma State University (SWOSU). Borrowing its name, in part, from the Lollapalooza festival, the event is sponsored and produced by the SWOSU Student Government Association (SGA), and is considered one of SWOSU's signature events. It showcases local and regional musicians, and frequently brings national recording artists to western Oklahoma as headliners.

== History ==
The idea for SWOSUPalooza originated in 1997 among a group of friends attending SWOSU, but was not acted on until the 1999–2000 academic year. SWOSU SGA struggled to secure funding for the first concert, and still lacked the needed funds as late as a month prior to the performance.

SWOSUPalooza was a free campus event for the first ten years of its existence. In 2010, SWOSU SGA voted to implement a minimal ticket price in order to raise additional funds and be able to bring in bigger bands.

SWOSUPalooza 21, originally scheduled to take place on April 9, 2020, was rescheduled for August 20 following a full transition to virtual course delivery for the spring 2020 semester due to the COVID-19 pandemic. It was later postponed again until October 22, and then yet again to March 25, 2021. Thus, there was no concert in 2020.

== Concerts ==
SWOSU- Palooza	Date	Headliners	Others	Location	Ref
1	Thursday; April 13, 2000	Mollys Yes	Between Thieves; Mercury 1	SWOSU campus Memorial Student Center; 35.5337°N 98.7071°W	
2	Thursday; April 19, 2001	Caroline's Spine	SpinAround; Mercury 1 Roustabouts; Spill	SWOSU campus Memorial Student Center; 35.5337°N 98.7071°W	
3	Thursday; April 18, 2002	Underwater People	Time Machine; Spoken; Subseven; Solomonsplendor; Banner Road; Escape The Goat; 5 Star Day; Lotic	SWOSU campus Memorial Student Center; 35.5337°N 98.7071°W	
4	Thursday; April 24, 2003	The Mimsies	Bleach; Wakeland; Stat Band; Subseven; Ephraim; The Destro; Walrus; Banner Road; Philadelphia	SWOSU campus Memorial Student Center; 35.5337°N 98.7071°W	
5	Thursday; April 15, 2004	Sly's Alter Ego (Note: 2004 94.7 The Buzz March Bandness winner)	Farewell Down; Sum Of Us; Banner Road; TroopSonic; The Weeping Tree; Solomonsplendor	SWOSU campus Memorial Student Center; 35.5337°N 98.7071°W	
6	Thursday; April 14, 2005	Subseven	Winter Circle (Note: 2005 94.7 The Buzz March Bandness winner); Jackson After The Accident; Welcome The Silence; Handing By A Thread; The Fighting Potato Wedges; Tulchalk	SWOSU campus Centennial Clock Tower; 35.5343°N 98.7078°W	
7	Thursday; April 13, 2006	Fresh Sunday (Note: 2006 94.7 The Buzz March Bandness winner)	Slingshot Method; Falling Sideways; Solomonsplendor; Hollow; Evicted; Lights Out	SWOSU campus south of Milam Stadium (Note: Prior to construction of Pioneer Cellular Event Center on the site); 35.5350°N 98.7108°W	
8	Thursday; April 12, 2007	Hush Hush Commotion (Note: 2007 94.7 The Buzz March Bandness winner)	Winter Circle; Slingshot Method; Congress Of A Crow; Chris Eaton Band; El Paso Hot Button; Meinert Brothers Band	SWOSU campus Memorial Student Center; 35.5337°N 98.7071°W	
9	Thursday; April 24, 2008	No Justice; Meant2B	Hush Hush Commotion; Skinny Road Walkin; Hollow; Vannadine	SWOSU campus south of Milam Stadium; 35.5350°N 98.7108°W	
10	Thursday; April 16, 2009	Randy Rogers Band	Welcome The Silence (Note: 2009 94.7 The Buzz March Bandness winner); 306; Skinny Road Walking	SWOSU campus Milam Stadium; 35.5360°N 98.7108°W	
11	Thursday; April 15, 2010	Johnny Cooper; The Bart Crow Band	Delvin; Ruffcutt; Theatre Breaks Loose; Sarah Simpson (Note: Miss SWOSU 2010)	SWOSU campus Wellness Center; 35.5361°N 98.7098°W	
12	Thursday; April 14, 2011	Eve 6 (Note: First performance with original members since 2004)	Green Corn Revival; Bleu Edmonson	SWOSU campus Wellness Center; 35.5361°N 98.7098°W	
13	Thursday; April 19, 2012	Stoney LaRue	Delvin Sirleaf; Curtis & Luckey; Josh Sallee	SWOSU campus Wellness Center; 35.5361°N 98.7098°W	
14	Thursday; April 25, 2013	David Nail	Jenny Simms	Rader Park; Doug Villines Pavilion; 35.5650°N 98.6756°W	
15	Saturday; April 5, 2014	Graham Colton; Falls	At Long Last; Denver Duncan; Tallows	SWOSU campus Centennial Clock Tower; 35.5343°N 98.7078°W	
16	Friday; April 10, 2015	Jason Boland & The Stragglers; Graham Colton	Jared Deck and the Travelers; Autumn Ray	SWOSU campus Pioneer Cellular Event Center; 35.5348°N 98.7109°W	
17	Tuesday; April 19, 2016	Whiskey Myers	Read Southall	SWOSU campus Pioneer Cellular Event Center; 35.5348°N 98.7109°W	
18	Thursday; March 30, 2017	Shane Smith & The Saints; Koe Wetzel	Tyler Wilhelm & A Few Dollars More	SWOSU campus Pioneer Cellular Event Center; 35.5348°N 98.7109°W	
19	Friday–Saturday; April 6–7, 2018	Stoney LaRue; Ben Rector	Flatland Cavalry; Keelan Donovan	SWOSU campus Pioneer Cellular Event Center; 35.5348°N 98.7109°W	
20	Friday; April 5, 2019	Parker McCollum; Read Southall Band	Hunter Thomas	SWOSU campus Pioneer Cellular Event Center; 35.5348°N 98.7109°W	
20	Saturday; April 6, 2019	Keelan Donovan	Scott Hand; Han Yu Shih; Yesterdayz Pantz; Grant Scowden; Jared Deck	Crowder Lake University Park; 35.4003°N 98.6991°W	
21	Thursday; March 25, 2021 (Note: Postponed from April 2020 due to COVID-19)	Flatland Cavalry	Mike Ryan; Triston Marez	SWOSU campus Pioneer Cellular Event Center; 35.5348°N 98.7109°W	
