= UT Dallas Comets =

Athletic teams that represent the University of Texas at Dallas

- University: University of Texas at Dallas
- Nickname: Comets
- NCAA: Division II
- Conference: Lone Star Conference
- Athletic director: Angela Marin
- Location: Richardson, Texas
- Varsity teams: 15 (7 men's, 8 women's, 0 co-ed)
- Basketball arena: UT Dallas Activity Center
- Baseball stadium: UT Dallas Baseball Field
- Softball stadium: UT Dallas Softball Field
- Soccer stadium: UT Dallas Soccer Complex
- Tennis venue: UT Dallas Tennis Complex
- Colors: Green and orange
- Mascot: Temoc
- Website: utdcomets.com

The UT Dallas Comets are the athletic teams that represent the University of Texas at Dallas, located in the Dallas suburb of Richardson, Texas, in NCAA Division II intercollegiate sports. On July 20, 2023, the university announced it would move to NCAA Division II and join the Lone Star Conference. On July 1, 2025, the Comets joined the Lone Star Conference, beginning the transition period from Division III. The Comets will not be eligible for NCAA postseason play until the 2026–27 season.

The Comets are full members of the Lone Star Conference, which is home to all seventeen athletic programs.

Prior to joining the Lone Star Conference, the Comets were full members of the American Southwest Conference, from the programs inception in 1998.

Varsity sports include baseball, basketball, cross country, golf, soccer, softball, tennis, track and field, and volleyball. In total, there are 17 intercollegiate teams officially supported by the university.

== History ==
The University of Texas at Dallas' Varsity athletics program started when UTD provisionally joined the NCAA Division III and the American Southwest Conference (ASC) in 1998 and was granted full membership in the ASC in 2002.

== Varsity teams ==
Men's sports	Women's sports
Baseball	Basketball
Basketball	Cross country
Cross country	Golf
Golf	Soccer
Soccer	Softball
Tennis	Tennis
Track and field †	Track and field †
	Volleyball
† – Track and field includes both indoor and outdoor

== Individual teams ==
=== Baseball and softball ===
- In 2003–04, the men's baseball and women's softball teams advanced to the post-season.
- The men's baseball team won the 2012 season ASC East Division Champions after closing out the regular season with a 27–13 overall record (14–4 in the ASC) and qualifying for the ASC Tournament for the ninth time in the program's 11-year history.
- In 2016–17, the women's softball team claimed their fifth ASC title after winning their first ASC championship game.
- The men's baseball team won their first ASC championship conference title in 2018.

=== Basketball ===
- In 2003–04, men's basketball advanced to the post-season.
- In 2005, the UTD Athletic Program claimed their first ASC Championship for men's basketball and advanced to the NCAA Division III national playoffs.
- On December 20, 2006, the Comets men's basketball team upset the University of Texas at Arlington Mavericks 78–76 at UT Arlington's Texas Hall and became the first Division III team to defeat a Division I basketball team during the 2006–2007 season.
- The woman's 2009 basketball team won the ASC East Division title, whereas the UTD men's basketball team won the ASC East Division both in 2010 and 2011.
- The UT Dallas women basketball team won the 2013 American Southwest Conference title.
- The UT Dallas men's basketball team won the 2014 ASC Tournament.
- Women's basketball won the ASC conference crown in 2016–17.
- For the first time in school history, both the Men's and Women's basketball teams won the 2018 NCAA Division III conference championships in the ASC Tournament.

=== Cross country ===
Women's cross country team won their first ASC conference crown in 2016 and their second in 2017. The men's cross country team won their first ASC conference crown in 2018.

=== E-sports ===
On September 24, 2018, the university added a co-ed Varsity Esports team managed under the athletic department. The team officially competes in collegiate competitions for League of Legends, Overwatch, and Super Smash Bros. Ultimate.

- In their inaugural year, UTD Esports ranked No. 8 overall in collegiate League of Legends competitions according to an official ESPN poll.
- In 2019 UTD Esports won the first US collegiate Super Smash Bros. Ultimate competition at the Collegiate Starleague Smash Ultimate National Championships, taking home the program's first national title.

=== Golf ===
Women's golf won its first ASC conference championship title in 2008, and placed 3rd in 2015.

=== Soccer ===
- During the 2002 inaugural season, the men and women's soccer teams competed for conference championships. The women won the 2002 ASC title and UTD ended up hosting the conference tournament as well as the first round of NCAA playoffs in UTD's first year as active members.
- The success continued in 2003–04 when men's and women's soccer advanced to the post-season.
- In 2005, the UTD Athletic Program claimed ASC Championships for men's and women's soccer, with the men's soccer team advancing to the NCAA Division III national playoffs.
- In 2007, the men's soccer team won the ASC championship, advancing to the NCAA tournament. Having 8 new team players as starters and only 3 veterans, the Comets led by top goal scorers Kevin White from Houston and Mihai Cotet from Braila, Romania led the team to its second ASC Tournament title in history.
- Men's soccer won an ASC conference crown in 2016–17.

=== Tennis ===
- The 2007 men's tennis program had a very successful season, beating Division II teams and advancing as far as the ASC Conference final before falling to Hardin-Simmons.
- The UT Dallas varsity tennis program won both the 2013 American Southwest Conference men's and women's tennis championships.
- Women's tennis won the 2018 ASC championship title.
- Both the Men's and Women's tennis teams won the 2019 ASC championship title.

=== Volleyball ===
- The women's volleyball team claimed the 2009 American Southwest Conference championship at the UT Dallas Activity Center. The 25–0, 2009 women's volleyball team was the only undefeated NCAA Division III team in the nation at the time.
- The women's volleyball team won the 2011 ASC East title with an undefeated home record of 6–0, and a conference record of 14–2.
- In 2016–17, the women's volleyball team won an ASC conference crown.
