= A. DeWade Langley =

American politician

Director of the Oklahoma State Bureau of Investigation
- In office 1995 – November 15, 2010
- Governor: Frank Keating; Brad Henry
- Succeeded by: Stan Florence

Personal details
- Born: Custer County, Oklahoma
- Education: Northwestern Oklahoma State University; Oklahoma State University
- Occupation: professor

A. DeWade Langley was a director of the Oklahoma State Bureau of Investigation, serving in that position from 1995 until his retirement in 2010.

Hired by the state agency as a special agent in 1977, Langley also served as a deputy inspector, inspector, and deputy director, before becoming director. Following his retirement as director, he was chosen to serve as the chair and director of the School of Criminal Justice at the University of Central Oklahoma.

== Early life and career ==
Before beginning his law enforcement career, Langley received a Bachelor of Science degree from Northwestern Oklahoma State University and a Master's degree from Oklahoma State University (OSU). He has served with the United States Army Reserve and the Oklahoma Army National Guard. Langley earned a Doctor of Education degree in Applied Educational Studies from Oklahoma State University. Langley started his career in 1970 in Custer County, Oklahoma working as an office deputy. He was hired on with the Oklahoma State Bureau of Investigation (OSBI) as a special agent in 1977. As a special agent, Langley was assigned to the Lawton, Oklahoma office.

Three years later in 1980, after a brief period as special agent, Langley was promoted to Deputy Inspector in Woodward, Oklahoma. In his position, Langley was the supervisor of the region. Langley remained an administrator and never served as a field agent for the remainder of his career. Langley was promoted to Inspector in that region four years later in 1984. In 1990, he was promoted to deputy director of the OSBI.

== OSBI director ==
Langley became director of the Oklahoma State Bureau of Investigation in 1995 and has served longer than any previous director. After his appointment, the agency has implemented the Statewide Intelligence Network, a Crime Scene Agent program, and computerized databases in DNA, Firearms and Tool Marks, and digital images. The agency has also become accredited by the American Society of Crime Lab Directors (ASCLD Lab) and has also attained national recognition for becoming one of only two law enforcement agencies in the state of Oklahoma to be accredited through the Commission on Accreditation for Law Enforcement Agencies (CALEA).

The bureau also opened a new $30 million high-tech laboratory, the Forensic Science Center in Edmond, Oklahoma in 2008.

== Later life ==
Langley served as an adjunct professor at Southwestern Oklahoma State University (SWOSU) in the Department of Parks and Recreation Management, where he taught courses in Parks and Wildlife Law Enforcement.

In 2010, Langley was selected to serve as the chair and director of the School of Criminal Justice at the University of Central Oklahoma.

== See also ==
- Oklahoma State Bureau of Investigation

Political offices
Preceded by	Director of the Oklahoma State Bureau of Investigation; Under Governors Frank Keating and Brad Henry; 1995 - November 15, 2010	Succeeded by Stan Florence
