= Ghosting (television) =

Replica of the transmitted image, offset in position

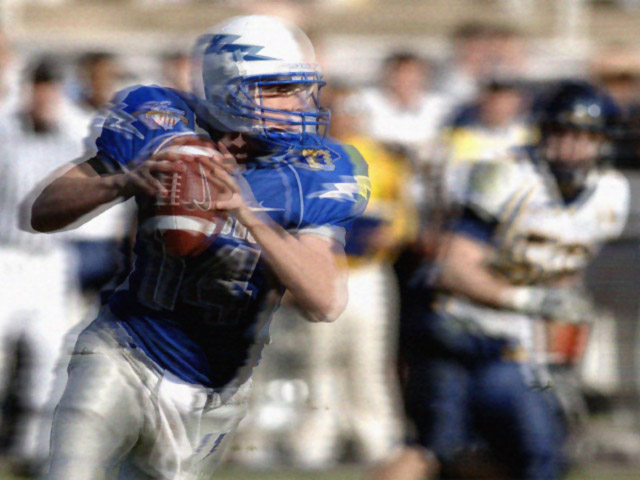
A simulated example of severe ghosting in an analog TV broadcast

In television, a ghost is a replica of the transmitted image, offset in position, that is superimposed on top of the main image. It is often caused when a TV signal travels by two different paths to a receiving antenna, with a slight difference in timing.

== Analog ghosting ==
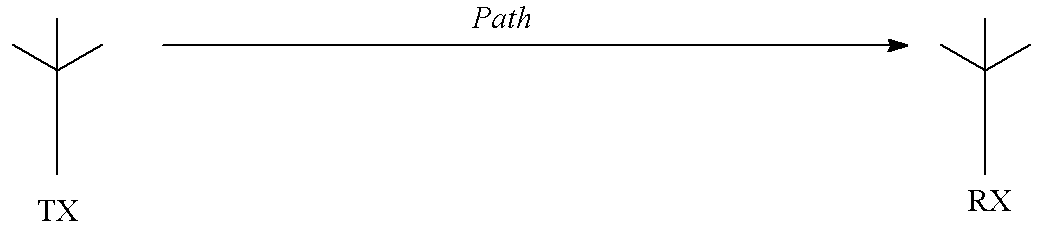
Ideal situation for TV signal propagation: The signal leaves the transmitter (TX) and travels through one path to the receiver (the TV set, which is labeled RX).

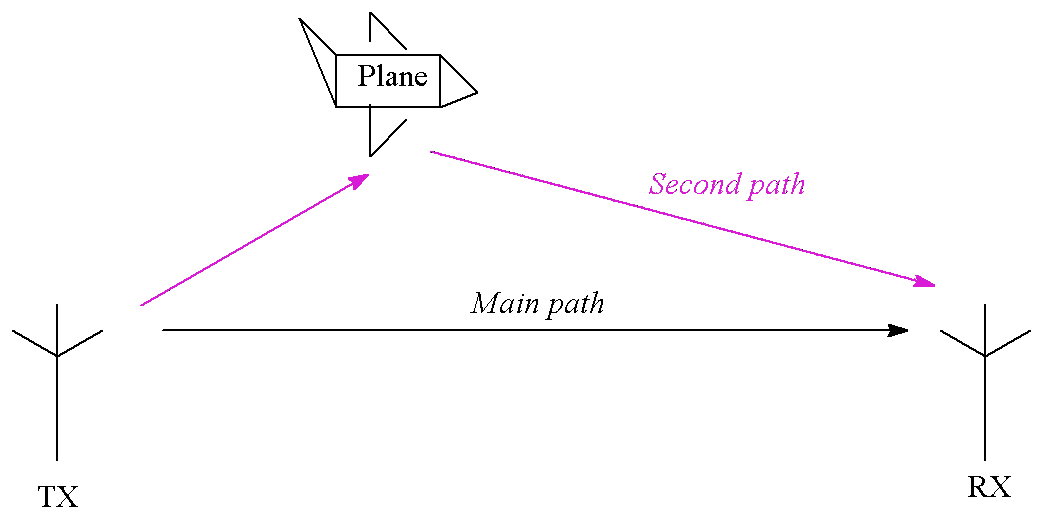
An object (an aircraft) complicates the system by adding a second path. The signal arrives at RX by two paths which have different lengths. The main path is the direct path, while the second is a reflection from the plane.

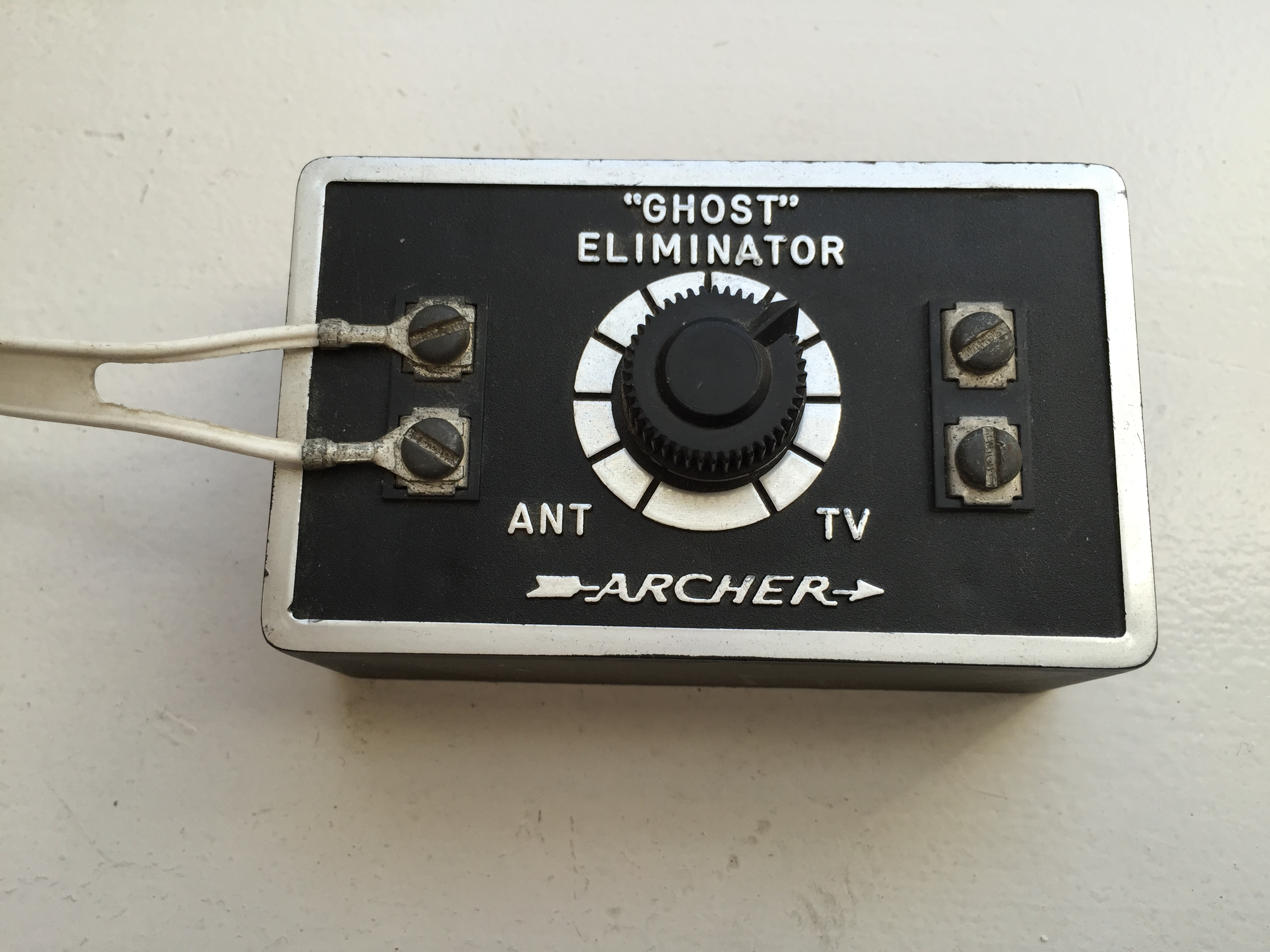
A "ghost eliminator" sold to consumers in the 1960s and 70s to make ghosting less visible. This unit was a simple resistive attenuator.

Common causes of ghosts (in the more specific sense) are:

- Mismatched impedance along the communication channel, which causes unwanted reflections. The technical term for this phenomenon is ringing.
- Multipath distortion, because radio frequency waves may take paths of different length (by reflecting from buildings, transmission lines, aircraft, clouds, etc.) to reach the receiver. In addition, RF leaks may allow a signal to enter the set by a different path; this is most common in a large building such as a tower block or hotel where one TV antenna feeds many different rooms, each fitted with a TV aerial socket (known as pre-echo). By getting a better antenna or cable system it can be eliminated or mitigated.

Note that ghosts are a problem specific to the video portion of television, largely because it uses AM for transmission. The audio portion uses FM, which has the desirable property that a stronger signal tends to overpower interference from weaker signals due to the capture effect. Even when ghosts are particularly bad in the picture, there may be little audio interference.

SECAM TV uses FM for the chrominance signal, hence ghosting only affects the luma portion of its signal. TV is broadcast on VHF and UHF, which have line-of-sight propagation, and easily reflect off of buildings, mountains, and other objects.

=== Pre-echo ===
If the ghost is seen on the left of the main picture, then it is likely that the problem is pre-echo, which is seen in buildings with very long TV downleads where an RF leakage has allowed the TV signal to enter the tuner by a second route. For instance, plugging in an additional aerial to a TV which already has a communal TV aerial connection (or cable TV) can cause this condition.

=== Hue shifting ===
More severe cases of ghosting can show the ghost with a different hue in than what was being intended to be broadcast. Sometimes, ghosting can change the phase of the color burst, thus confusing the television set and displaying the wrong color.

== Digital ghosting ==
Ghosting is not specific to analog transmission. It may appear in digital television when interlaced video is incorrectly deinterlaced for display on progressive-scan output devices. The mechanisms that cause ghosting in analog television may corrupt the signal beyond use for digital television. 8VSB, COFDM, and other modulation schemes seek to correct this.

== See also ==
- Ghost-canceling reference
- Onion skinning
