= UT Dallas Baseball Field =

Baseball venue in Richardson, Texas, US

Coordinates: 32.9819°N 96.7493°W

UTD Baseball Field is a baseball venue located in Richardson, Texas, and home to the UT Dallas Comets baseball program, which was constructed prior to 2002 when the University of Texas at Dallas added baseball and softball programs to its intercollegiate sport program. The ballpark holds a capacity of 250. The Comets participate in the Lone Star Conference.
