= Steven Pray =

American pharmacist and academic

W. Steven Pray is an American pharmacist and academic who is an expert on non-prescription (over-the-counter) medicines. He is the Bernhardt Professor of Nonprescription Products and Devices at Southwestern Oklahoma State University's College of Pharmacy. Pray also volunteers as pharmacy director for the Weatherford Agape Medical Clinic, a free clinic.

He won the National Association of Boards of Pharmacy's Henry Cade Memorial Award for 2008.

He has published several books, including A history of nonprescription product regulation and Nonprescription product therapeutics.

Pray has been quoted by the Boston Globe and Newhouse News Service about over-the-counter medicines and their alternatives.

He is married to Carole Pray.
