= Joe Anna Hibler =

American educator (born 1939)

- Born: Joe Anna Hibler; May 5, 1939 (age 87); Shattuck, Oklahoma, U.S.
- Occupations: Administration and Higher Education
- Known for: Former President of Southwestern Oklahoma State University

Joe Anna Hibler (born May 5, 1939) is an American educator. Much of her career was spent teaching business at the university level. Retired from active teaching, she is the former president of Southwestern Oklahoma State University (SWOSU), an inductee into the Oklahoma Women's Hall of Fame, and currently a regent of the Regional University System of Oklahoma.

== Early life ==
Joe Anna Hibler was born on May 5, 1939, in Shattuck, Oklahoma. Soon after Hibler was born, her family moved to Leedey, Oklahoma where she spent most of her early life going to school. Hibler graduated from Leedey High School. Her parents (Note: The 1940 U.S. census shows Joe Anna living with her father, Wilson Hibler, and mother, Anna Hibler, in Leedey, Oklahoma. There were no other members of the household.) both worked in school teaching and administration. Hibler later told an interviewer that, "...a woman had three career choices: a teacher, nurse or secretary,” She also said, "I didn’t like the sight of blood and knew I didn’t want to be a teacher, so I chose business." So, she enrolled for a 40-hour course at Southwestern State College that would lead to certification as a secretary.

== Education ==
Hibler also learned that she loved college and wanted to do more in life than just be a secretary. She also found business courses fascinating, so, she decided to become a business teacher. In three years, she earned a Bachelor of Science degree from Southwestern State College, now named Southwestern Oklahoma State University (SWOSU), and her master's degree from Oklahoma State University, both in business education. (Note: While Joe Anna was pursuing her bachelor's degree, both of her parents were also enrolled in SWOSU part time, earning masters' degrees in education. Still working full-time in Leedey, they drove to Weatherford to attend night classes, then spend full-time at the campus during summer.) From 1969 to 1971, Hibler took a sabbatical to work on her doctorate in business education at the University of Oklahoma. While she was at OU, Hibler was hired as a special instructor in the College of Business Administration.

== Career ==
Upon graduation from Oklahoma State University, Hibler taught business at Altus High School and Altus Junior College for four years. She was then hired by her alma mater, SWOSU, where she stayed for 36 years teaching courses in business as well as holding various administrative positions. For four years Hibler served as the Dean of the School of Business and another four years as the Executive Vice President of Academic Affairs, starting in 1986. In 1990, Hibler was appointed by the Board of Regents of Oklahoma colleges as the president of Southwestern, headquartered in Weatherford. She took office July 1, 1990. Hibler was the first woman in 55 years to hold be named president of a college in Oklahoma and only the second woman in Oklahoma history to hold the position. While president of SWOSU, Hibler remained in the classroom, teaching business classes. Hibler served on the Council of Presidents as president in 1996. Hibler served as the president of Southwestern for 11 years and retired in 2001. In 2004, Governor Brad Henry appointed Hibler to the Board of Regents of the Regional University System of Oklahoma (RUSO).

As president, Hibler focused on building up the school's financial resources through outreach to alumni. In 1990, the university foundation collected $840,000. By mid year 2001, the assets totaled over $7 million, and were on track to exceed $10 million by the end of the year.

Programs started during her presidency included:

- Developed a pharmacy doctorate program;
- Started Foss Lake Adventure Program for at-risk youth;
- Instituted The Center for Economic and Business Development, serving 13 counties in Southwest Oklahoma.

== Service and volunteer work ==
Hibler's service includes, working for the Women’s Foundation of Oklahoma, where she acts as the board chair, Oklahoma Higher Education Heritage Society, Oklahoma United Methodist Foundation, and the Wesley Foundation. In 2004, Hibler was appointed by the Governor of Oklahoma to serve on the Board of Regents of Oklahoma Colleges. Hibler is also a member of the Kiwanis Club, volunteers for the Early Bird Program and Burcham Elementary School, and at the General Thomas P. Stafford Air and Space Museum.

== Achievements ==
- Oklahoma Women’s Hall of Fame (2007)
- Southwestern Oklahoma State University Distinguished Alumni Hall of Fame(2003)
- Oklahoma Higher Education Hall of Fame(1994)
- Oklahoma Educators Hall of Fame
- Western Oklahoma Hall of Fame
- Dewey County Historical Society Hall of Fame
