= Arnie Shockley =

American football player and coach (1903–1988)

Profile
- Position: Tackle

Personal information
- Born: August 31, 1903; Illinois
- Died: April 27, 1988 (aged 84); Lawton, Oklahoma
- Listed height: 6 ft 2 in (1.88 m)
- Listed weight: 220 lb (100 kg)

Career information
- High school: Mountain View (Mountain View, Oklahoma)
- College: Southwestern Oklahoma State

Career history
- Boston Bulldogs (1929)

Arnold A. Shockley (August 31, 1903 – April 27, 1988) was an American professional football player who spent one season in the National Football League (NFL) with the Boston Bulldogs, in 1929. Shockley was an all-conference tackle at Southwestern Oklahoma State University in 1926 and 1927. He then went on to be a coach and administrator working for more than 30 years in schools at Jackson, Greer and Kiowa counties. He spent his last 13 years working at Mountain View High School before retiring in 1965. He was inducted into the Southwestern Oklahoma State University Athletics Hall of Fame in 1965.

== Right name, wrong player? ==
According to an article by the Professional Football Researchers Association, however, Shockley never played for the Bulldogs in 1929. The player listed on the field as Arnold Shockley was really Perry Jackson, a teammate of Arnie's from Southwestern Oklahoma State University. According to Jackson, he was disappointed when he didn't receive an invitation to tryout for any professional team after playing college football. However Arnold Shockley, received an invitation to try out for the Bulldogs. Shockley decided not to go to the try out and Jackson saw this as an opportunity to tryout for a pro team. He went to the camp, assuming the name of his teammate, Shockley. He made the team and played that year as Arnold Shockley. The only problem with his story is that Jackson was playing for the Providence Steam Roller in 1928–1930. However his write up for the SWOSU Hall of Fame states that he played for Providence for four seasons. This sets up a controversy over which teams Shockley and Perry played for. Also the stats for Perry and Shockley appear to be same according to profootballreference.com and databasefootball.com In trying to clear up the mistake in identity of the players, Bob Carroll, also of PFRA stated that the real Jackson, under the alias Shockley, played for Providence, while Shockley, using Jackson's name, played for Boston.
