= Shane Drury =

American bull rider (1979-2006)

Shane Wesley Drury (June 29, 1979 - October 31, 2006) was an American professional rodeo cowboy who specialized in bull riding. He competed in the Professional Rodeo Cowboys Association (PRCA). He was also known for his inspiration to fight cancer.

== Childhood and pre-career ==
Drury was born in Cheyenne, Wyoming, and was reared with his two brothers, Chad and Jesse, in Rapid City, South Dakota. In 2001, he graduated with a business degree from Southwestern Oklahoma State University in Weatherford, Oklahoma.

== Career ==
Drury was on the Southwestern Oklahoma State University rodeo team that, in 1999, won the National Intercollegiate Rodeo Association (NIRA)'s national championship at the College National Finals Rodeo (CNFR). In 2000, Drury won enough money at the end of the PRCA's regular season and qualified for the National Finals Rodeo (NFR) in Las Vegas, Nevada, as one of the top 15 bull riders. He finished in 10th place in the PRCA world standings at the end of the event.

In 2001, Drury won the Reno Rodeo in Reno, Nevada, which included setting a bull riding arena record. Drury started experiencing back pain (as a result of the cancer that would claim his life) later that year, but he fought through it, and he almost qualified for the NFR again, finishing 19th in the PRCA world standings for the year.

Despite his illness, Drury kept on riding, though on a lesser basis, through 2005.

== Cancer and death ==
Drury was diagnosed on May 5, 2002, with Ewing's sarcoma, a rare type of cancer found most commonly in teenagers. He was treated at the Denver Children's Hospital. Following chemotherapy treatments, a tumor was found and removed in his chest cavity. The cancer went away for a year, and Drury judged rodeos while recuperating. However, the cancer came back twice more in the next two years. He ultimately died on October 31, 2006, at the age of 27.

== Shane Drury Scholarship ==
The Shane Drury Scholarship is a scholarship given to a National Intercollegiate Rodeo Association member that has "faced adversity in their own lives and never given up". The first award was given to Jyme Peterson, a student at Montana State University, during the College National Finals Rodeo in June 2006.

== Other media ==
Nothin' But Try: The Shane Drury Story, by author Tall Paul, is the late athlete's biography written in 2008. ISBN 978-1438919416.
