= Ghost-canceling reference =

Analog TV signal component

Ghost-canceling reference (GCR) is a special sub-signal on a television channel that receivers can use to compensate for the ghosting effect of a television signal distorted by multipath propagation between transmitter and receiver.

In the United States, the GCR signal is a chirp in frequency of the modulating signal from 0 Hz to 4.2 MHz, transmitted during the vertical blanking interval over one video line (line 19 in the U.S.), shifted in phase by 180° once per frame, with this pattern inverted every four lines. Television receivers generate their own local versions of this signal and use the comparison between the local and remote signals to tune an adaptive equalizer that removes ghost images on the screen.

GCR was introduced after its recommendation in 1993 by the Advanced Television Systems Committee.
