= Carl Birdsong =

American football player (born 1959)

No. 18
- Position: Punter

Personal information
- Born: January 1, 1959 (age 67); Kaufman, Texas, U.S.
- Listed height: 6 ft 0 in (1.83 m)
- Listed weight: 192 lb (87 kg)

Career information
- High school: Amarillo
- College: Southwestern Oklahoma State
- NFL draft: 1981: undrafted

Career history
- Buffalo Bills (1981)*; St. Louis Cardinals (1981–1985)
- * Offseason or practice squad member only

Awards and highlights
- Pro Bowl (1983)
- Stats at Pro Football Reference

George Carlisle Birdsong (born January 1, 1959) is an American former professional football player who was a punter for the St. Louis Cardinals of the National Football League (NFL) from 1981 to 1985.

Birdsong attended Crockett Junior High School in Amarillo, Texas. Birdsong graduated from Amarillo High School and then attended West Texas State University before transferring to, and graduating from, Southwestern Oklahoma State University. Birdsong made the Pro Bowl in 1983, but for an elite punter his professional career was short – by 1986, Birdsong was out of the NFL.

== Personal life ==
Married to Shylan Birdsong, Carl Birdsong is the father of Shylana and Orry Birdsong.

He graduated from Southwestern Oklahoma State with honors from its School of Pharmacy. Upon completing his college degree he became a pharmacist with Maxor National Pharmacy Services Corporation in Amarillo, and currently serves as the company's President and Chief Compliance Officer.
