= Southwestern Oklahoma State University =

University in Weatherford and Sayre, Oklahoma, US

Coordinates: 35°32′04″N 98°42′28″W

- Former names: Southwestern Normal School (1901–1920); Southwestern State Teachers College (1920–1939); Southwestern State College of Diversified Occupations (1939–1941); Southwestern Institute of Technology (1941–1949); Southwestern State College (1949–1974)
- Type: Public university
- Established: 1901; 125 years ago
- Parent institution: Regional University System of Oklahoma
- Academic affiliations: Space-grant
- Endowment: $25 million
- President: Joel Kendall
- Faculty: 202 full-time, 1 part-time
- Undergraduates: 4,450
- Postgraduates: 817
- Location: Weatherford, Oklahoma, U.S.
- Campus: Rural, 303 acres (123 ha)
- Colors: Navy blue and white
- Nickname: Bulldogs
- Sporting affiliations: NCAA Division II – GAC
- Website: swosu.edu
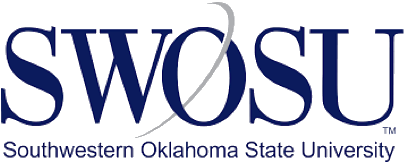

Southwestern Oklahoma State University (SWOSU) is a public university in Weatherford and Sayre, Oklahoma. It is one of six Regional University System of Oklahoma members.

== History ==
SWOSU was first established through an act of the Oklahoma Territorial Legislature in 1901 as "Southwestern Normal School", although no classes were held until 1903. Several towns fought a court battle to become the home of the new school, but Weatherford won the battle. The normal school included both a two-year degree program for teacher education and a preparatory school. In 1920, the preparatory part of the school closed and a four-year baccalaureate degree program replaced it. The first bachelor's degrees by the renamed "Southwestern State Teachers College" were awarded in the spring of 1921.

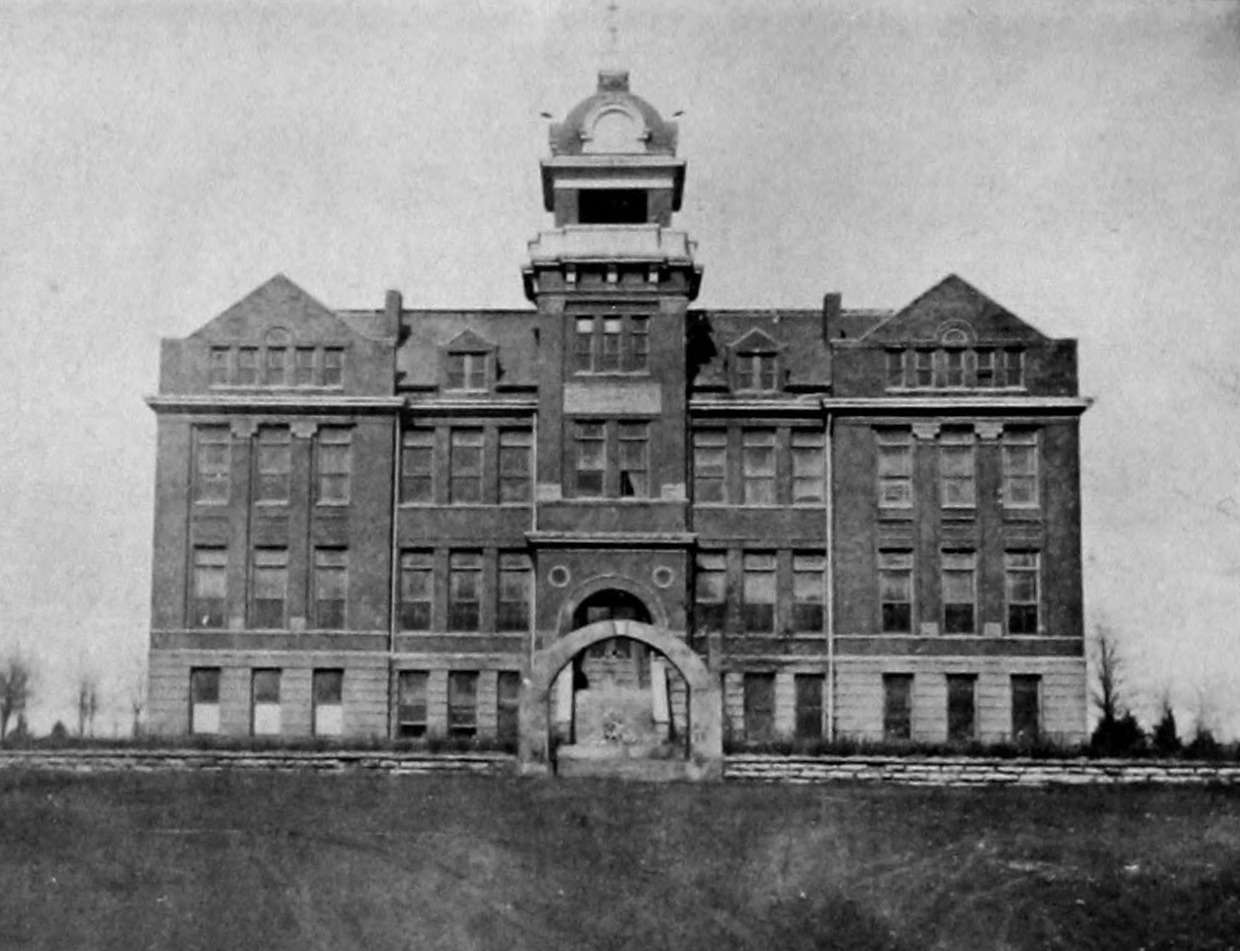
Southwestern administration building in 1919

The Great Depression brought several attempts to close the school for financial reasons. It had to remove several presidents to survive politically. But it did survive. In 1939, the school added a vocational training curriculum to its teacher-training mission.

The school underwent significant expansion during World War II, adding additional programs in the arts and sciences as well as its School of Pharmacy. After brief periods as "Southwestern State College of Diversified Occupations" and "Southwestern Institute of Technology", the name was formally changed to Southwestern State College by the Oklahoma Legislature. The first graduate degree, a Masters of Teaching, was added in 1953, and the school was officially designated as "Southwestern Oklahoma State University" in 1974.

In 1987, Sayre Junior College in Sayre, Oklahoma was merged with SWOSU, becoming Southwestern Oklahoma State University at Sayre.

=== Presidents ===
There have been 18 presidents that have served at Southwestern Oklahoma State University:

1. James Robert Campbell (1903–1907)
2. John Fletcher Sharp (1907–1911)
3. Ulysses J. Griffith (1911–1915)
4. James Burnette Eskridge (1915–1921)
5. Alfred H. Burris (1921–1923)
6. James Walter Turner (1923–1927)
7. Ernest Edward Brown (1927–1932)
8. Charles Walter Richards (1932–1935)
9. Walter W. Isle (1935–1939)
10. James B. Boren (1939–1942)
11. G.S. Sanders (1942–1945)
12. R. Harold Burton (1945–1960)
13. Dr. Al Harris (1960–1975)
14. Dr. Leonard Campbell (1975–1990)
15. Dr. Joe Anna Hibler (1990–2001)
16. Dr. John Hays (2001–2010)
17. Randy Beutler (2010–2021)
18. Diana Lovell (2021–present)

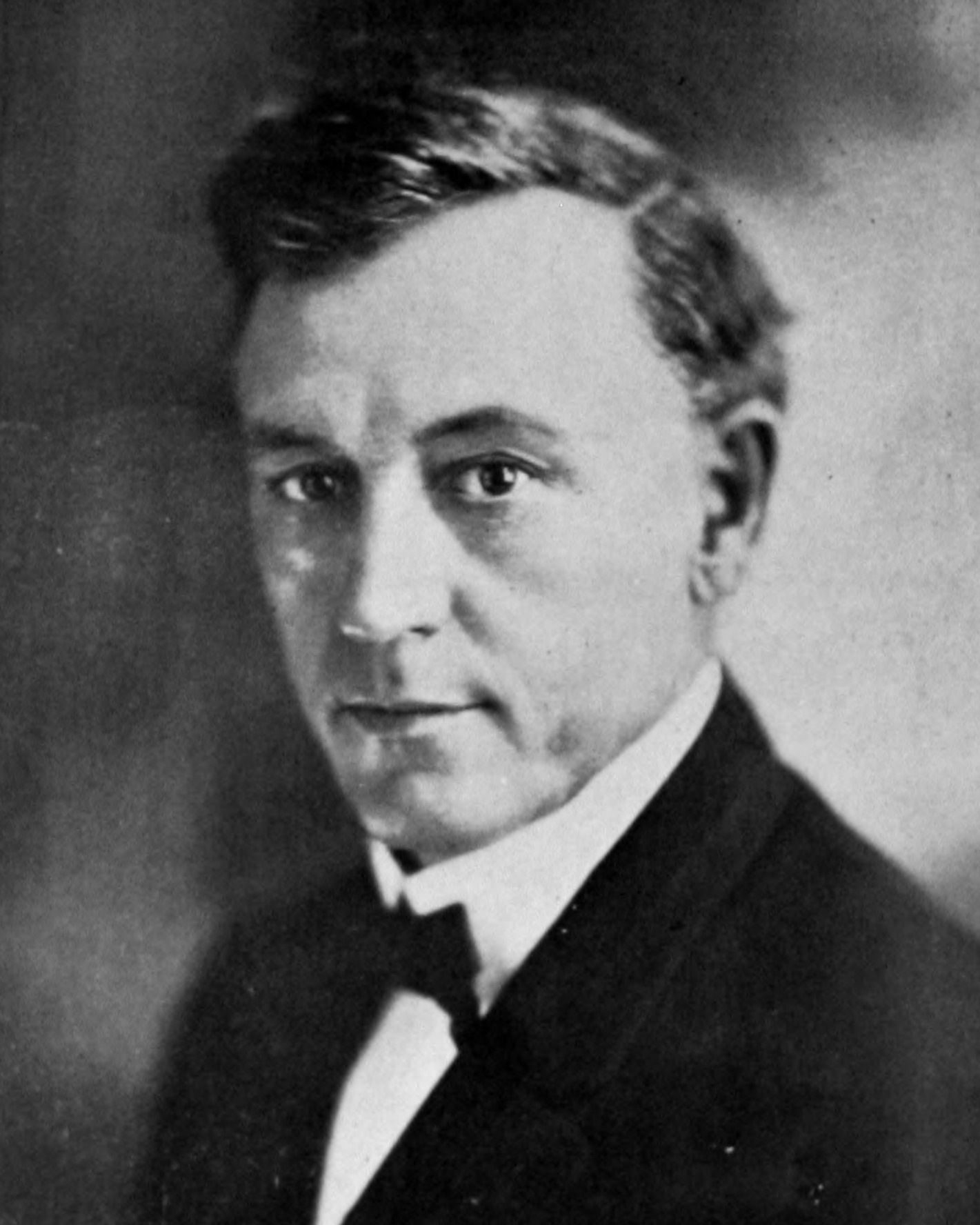
4th President James Burnette Eskridge (1915–1921)

== Campus life ==
Undergraduate demographics as of Fall 2023
Race and ethnicity	Total
White	62%
Hispanic	14%
Two or more races	10%
American Indian/Alaska Native	4%
Black	5%
International student	2%
Unknown	2%
Asian	1%
Economic diversity
Low-income (Note: The percentage of students who received an income-based federal Pell grant intended for low-income students.)	41%
Affluent (Note: The percentage of students who are a part of the American middle class at the bare minimum.)	59%

On Southwestern Oklahoma State University's campus, there are several places to eat such as The University Grill, The Bulldog Beanery, Brandy's Quick Stop, and Duke's Diner.

=== Weatherford Campus ===
The Weatherford campus has a span of over 100 acres. The campus is the grounds for several diverse buildings, some dating back to the school's opening in 1903, and some as recent as 2014. The new Pioneer Cellular Event Center opened January 2014. SWOSU offers 38 bachelor's degrees, 7 associate degrees, 6 master's degrees and 1 doctorate. Enrollment for SWOSU is approximately 5,200 and the most up-to-date student-to-faculty ratio is 20:1. SWOSU has a Veteran's assistance program as well as a distance learning program. As of June 2017, SWOSU made the ranking in a MSN "Best Schools of 2017" list. SWOSU was ranked #18 in the list.

=== SWOSU at Sayre ===
SWOSU at Sayre was founded in 1938 as a Junior College, but in July 1987 by act of the Oklahoma legislature, it was merged with Southwestern Oklahoma State University. It offers open admission to high school graduates. SWOSU at Sayre offers Associate of Science and Associate of Applied Science degrees in both general and specialized areas of study.

== Student life ==
=== Athletics ===
SWOSU's athletic teams are known as the Bulldogs. The university competes at the NCAA Division II level as a member of the Great American Conference (GAC). SWOSU began play in the GAC in the 2012–2013 academic year. SWOSU offers nine different sports including: baseball, men's and women's basketball, women's track and field, women's cross country, football, men's and women's golf, men's and women's rodeo, women's soccer, softball and volleyball.

=== Campus organizations ===
There are nearly 100 student organizations such as SGA (Student Government Association), CAB (Campus Activities Board), NSO (New Student Orientation), GSM Project (Gender and Sexual Minorities Project, formally SODA (Sexual Orientation Diversity Association)), RHJB (Residence Hall Judicial Board) and Greek Fraternities and Sororities that offer interesting activities to make campus life more exciting for students. The events these organizations put on are typically free to students. SGA is the official governing body of SWOSU students. It is the advocate for student interests, a powerful voice for change and progress, and a dedicated provider of student services and resources. SGA puts on annual events such as SWOSUPalooza.

== Notable people ==
=== Notable alumni ===
- John Aaron, NASA engineer who developed the electrical recovery sequence for the Apollo 13 mission
- Carl Birdsong, former NFL punter
- Bill Brewster, former U.S. Congressman
- Ray Burris, former MLB pitcher
- Royce Chadwick, college basketball coach
- N. S. Corn, earned a teaching certificate, attorney, former Oklahoma Supreme Court justice, a central figure in the Oklahoma Supreme Court Scandal during the mid-1960s
- Richard Darby, attorney, Oklahoma Supreme Court justice
- Shane Drury, former PRCA bullrider
- Glenn English, former U.S. Congressman
- Michelle Nicole Evans, Mrs. America 2015
- Joe Anna Hibler, alumna and former President of SWOSU
- Pat Irwin, attorney, Oklahoma Supreme Court Justice
- Yvonne Kauger, attorney, Oklahoma Supreme Court justice
- Grady Lewis, former NBA player
- Gary Linderman, pharmacist, last remaining resident of Picher, Oklahoma
- Merlin Little Thunder, Southern Cheyenne artist
- Cord McCoy, PBR bullrider and contestant on The Amazing Race, The Amazing Race: Unfinished Business, and Amazing Race: All Stars
- John "Red" Patterson, Los Angeles Dodgers pitcher
- Rex Ryan, former head coach for the Buffalo Bills
- Rob Ryan, former assistant head coach / defense for the Buffalo Bills
- Arnie Shockley, former professional football player
- Stanley Vestal, American writer, poet, biographer, and historian, perhaps best known for his books on the American Old West, including Sitting Bull, Champion of the Sioux
- Kathleen Wilcoxson, former Oklahoma State Senator representing part of Oklahoma City

=== Notable faculty and staff ===
- J. W. Cole, American football coach
- Otis Delaporte, American football and baseball player and coach
- A. DeWade Langley, former Director of the Oklahoma State Bureau of Investigation
- Alice McElroy Procter, composer
- Steven Pray, professor of pharmacy and expert on OTC medication
