= Kevin Dogins =

American football player (born 1972)

No. 65, 73
- Position: Guard/Center

Personal information
- Born: December 7, 1972 (age 53); Eagle Lake, Texas, U.S.

Career information
- High school: Rice (Eagle Lake)
- College: Texas A&M–Kingsville
- NFL draft: 1996: undrafted

Career history
- Dallas Cowboys (1996)*; Tampa Bay Buccaneers (1996–2000); Chicago Bears (2001–2002); Atlanta Falcons (2003)*; Philadelphia Eagles (2003); Tampa Bay Storm (2006)
- * Offseason or practice squad member only

Awards and highlights
- Division II All-American (1995); 3× All-LSC (1993, 1994, 1995)

Career NFL statistics
- Games played: 49
- Games started: 17
- Stats at Pro Football Reference
- Stats at ArenaFan.com

Kevin Ray Dogins (born December 7, 1972) is an American former professional football player who was a guard in the National Football League (NFL) for the Tampa Bay Buccaneers and Chicago Bears. He also was a member of the Tampa Bay Storm in the Arena Football League (AFL). He played college football for the Texas A&M–Kingsville Javelinas.

== Early life ==
Dogins attended Rice High School in Eagle Lake, Texas, where he received All-district, All-conference, All-Greater Houston and All-American honors as a senior.

He accepted a football scholarship from Division II Texas A&M-Kingsville, where his position coach was future NFL coach Juan Castillo. He became a starter at center as a freshman. In his last 2 years, he was part of an offensive line that included Jermane Mayberry and Jorge Diaz. He earned All-American and All-conference honors as a senior.

In 2008, he was inducted into the Javelina Hall of Fame.

== Professional career ==
Dogins was signed as an undrafted free agent by the Dallas Cowboys after the 1996 NFL draft. He was waived on August 19.

On August 27, 1996, he was signed as a free agent by the Tampa Bay Buccaneers. He spent 4 seasons as a backup at guard and center. In 1998, he started 4 out of 6 games at guard. In 1999, he passed Jorge Diaz on the depth chart and started 5 games at left guard.

On June 22, 2001, he was signed as a free agent by the Chicago Bears. In 2002, he started 8 games at multiple positions along the offensive line. He wasn't re-signed after the season.

On April 10, 2003, he was signed as a free agent by the Atlanta Falcons. He was released on August 30.

On October 27, 2003, he was signed as a free agent by the Philadelphia Eagles, to provide depth after guard Jermane Mayberry was placed on the injured reserve list. He was declared inactive in 3 games and was released on December 20.

On January 25, 2006, he signed with the Tampa Bay Storm of the Arena Football League. He was placed on the injured reserve list on January 27. He was activated on March 25. He was waived on May 11.

== Personal life ==
After football he worked as a real estate agent in Tampa Bay, Florida.
