= Texas A&M–Kingsville Javelinas =

- University: Texas A&M University–Kingsville
- Nickname: Javelinas
- NCAA: Division II
- Conference: LSC (primary)
- Athletic director: Mike Salinas
- Location: Kingsville, Texas
- Varsity teams: 14 (5 men's, 9 women's)
- Football stadium: Pepsi Field at Javelina Stadium
- Basketball arena: Gil E. Steinke Physical Education Center
- Baseball stadium: Nolan Ryan Field
- Softball stadium: Vernie and Blanche Hubert Field
- Tennis venue: Javelina Tennis Courts
- Colors: Blue and gold
- Mascot: Porky
- Fight song: Jalisco
- Website: javelinaathletics.com

The Texas A&M–Kingsville Javelinas (/ˌhɑːvəˈliːnə/ HAH-və-LEE-nə) are the athletic teams that represent Texas A&M University–Kingsville (TAMUK) in Kingsville, Texas, in intercollegiate sports at the Division II level of the National Collegiate Athletic Association (NCAA), primarily competing in the Lone Star Conference (LSC) since the 1954–55 academic year.

Some of the women's athletic teams use the name Lady Javelinas; however, the school's other teams use the Javelina name. The javelina serves as the mascot representing the teams, and the school colors are blue and gold.

== History ==
From the establishment of the university as "South Texas State Teachers College" in 1925, the students of the school chose the javelina as a mascot – the only college or university in the world to do so. After suffering an attack by one of the three mascots on the campus in 1929, the school's first president, Dr. Robert Cousins, stated that the creature stands for a symbol of the character of the school's students.

The first varsity letters were awarded to 15 members of the Javelina football team in December 1925. By the time of the school's first name change (to "Texas College of Arts and Industries") in 1929, the school participated in a wide array of sports, including football, baseball, men and women's basketball, and men and women's track and field.

Today, the school competes in 11 NCAA varsity sports. The school has a rich history of athletes who have moved on to national and international competition in the Olympic Games, as well as various professional sport leagues.

== Sports ==
Texas A&M–Kingsville (TAMUK) competes in 13 intercollegiate varsity sports: Men's sports include baseball, basketball, cross country, football and track & field; while women's sports include basketball, beach volleyball, cross country, golf, softball, tennis, track & field and volleyball.

The university also offers various club and intramural sports. Participation in these activities by individual students and clubs in the university is highly encouraged.

=== Football ===
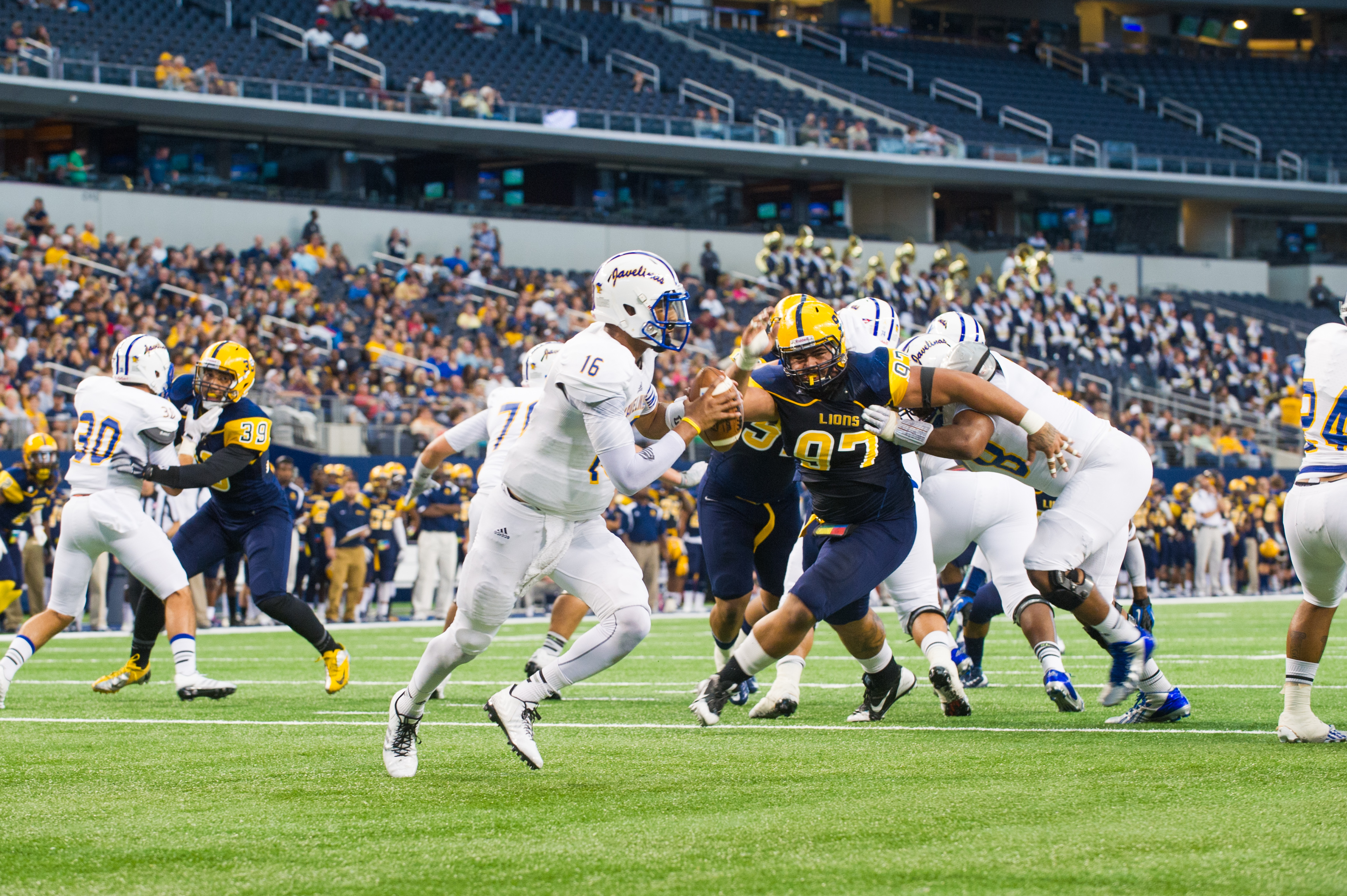
The Javelinas football team in action against the Texas A&M–Commerce Lions in 2014

Since the school was established 1925, football has been the most popular sport on campus.

In early 1929, the school joined the original Texas Intercollegiate Athletic Association (TIAA). By the time the TIAA folded, the "Fighting Javelinas" had won two football championships. Following this, the school competed independently for several years. They moved from competing with junior colleges and teachers' colleges to competing against larger schools throughout the state. One highlight of this period included a football game that pitted the Javelinas against the Aggies of Texas A&M at Kyle Field in College Station. The Javelinas led the game until the Aggies tied it at 14 with three minutes left to play. The game ended in a tie. However, the Javelinas demonstrated that they could hold their own with a large football powerhouse. This further substantiated the team's nickname as "the toughest little team in the nation."

In 1934, the school participated in the Lone Star Conference on a probationary period. In 1935, the school joined the Alamo Conference. By 1937, the Javelinas captured their first Alamo Conference co-championship (with St. Mary's). The next year, the Javelinas won their first outright Alamo Conference football championship. This led to a string of football championships and the school's recognition as a football powerhouse.

For the 1954 season, A&I was finally inducted into the Lone Star Conference (LSC). By 1959, the Javelinas won the first in a long string of LSC championships. Since then, the school has remained a perennial conference powerhouse, winning 27 championships. During the years that the LSC was a member of the National Association of Intercollegiate Athletics (NAIA), the Javelinas also picked up seven national championships. During the 1970s, the Javelinas won five NAIA national championships and went undefeated from the last game of 1973 through third game of 1977.

After the LSC joined the National Collegiate Athletic Association's Division II in 1980, the Javelinas continued their conference, regional, and national success. Just a year after the university changed its name to Texas A&M University–Kingsville, the Javelinas played in the 1994 NCAA Division II National Football Championship, only to lose to the University of North Alabama by a score of 16–10. While an NCAA D2 national championship remains elusive, the Javelinas continuously remained nationally ranked football team poised to challenge for an elusive title.

The success of the Javelina Football team has led many writers and recruiters to dub the school a "football factory". More than 150 athletes from Javelina football teams have gone on to play professional football, and more than 50 of these were draft picks in the NFL draft – more than any other school in either the NAIA or NCAA Division II. As a result, many athletes choose to play for Texas A&M University–Kingsville simply for the opportunity to shine on a national stage.

=== Baseball and softball ===
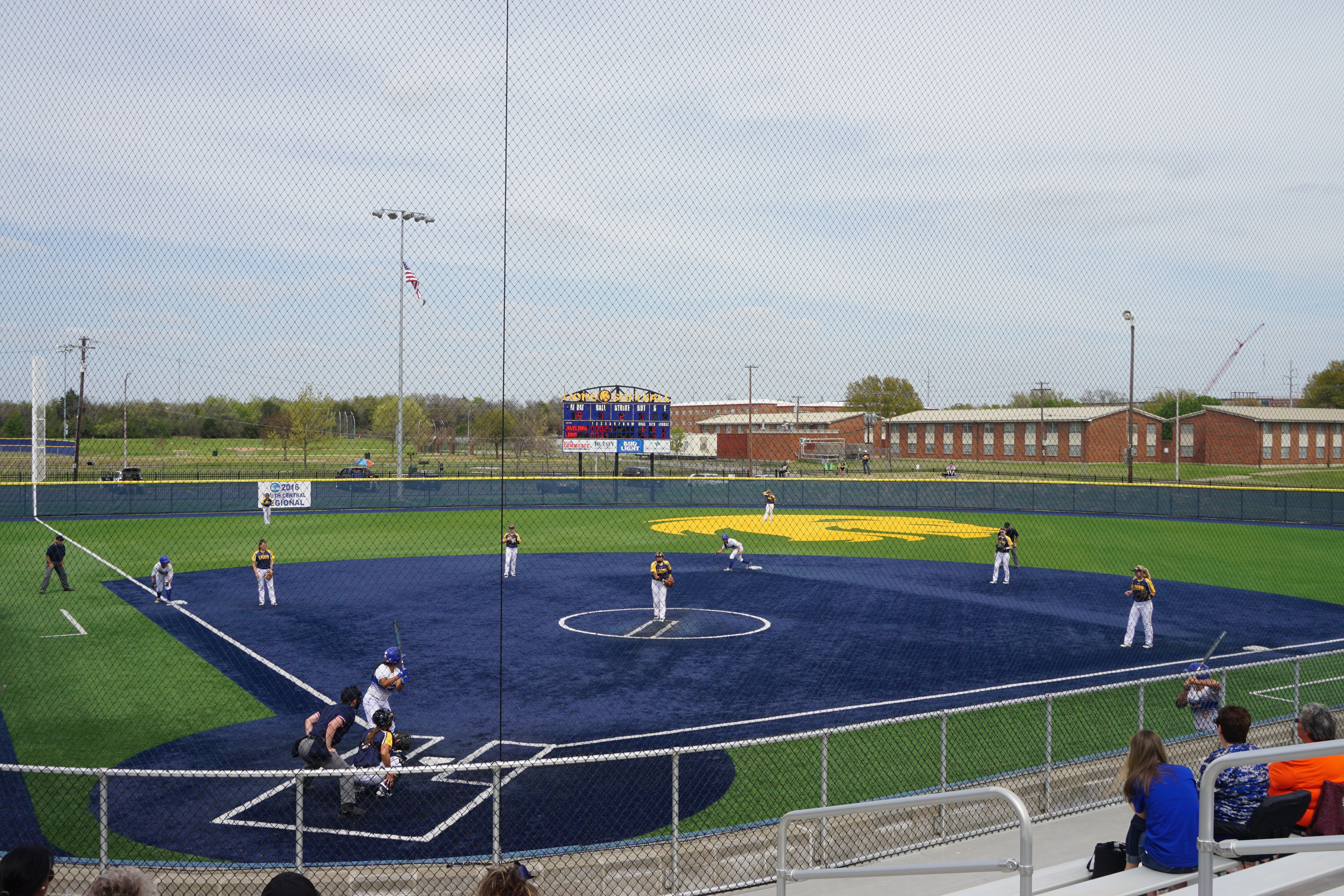
The Javelinas softball team in action against Texas A&M–Commerce in 2018

Baseball began as a competitive team sport at the school in 1926. As the national pastime, it was immediately popular among students, faculty, and administration. Unfortunately, the vast distance between schools and the limited number of teams with baseball] programs made justifying the enormous cost to the new school difficult. To much chagrin, the school discontinued the program in 1930.

In 1990, athletic director and Javelina Football Coach Ron Harms announced that the university would re-establish a baseball team after more than 60 years. In 1992, pitcher Nolan Ryan and a local rancher named Frank Horlock established a fund to build a baseball stadium on the campus. A year later, Ryan and Horlock, along with NFL coaching legend Bum Phillips, actor Larry Hagman, and other celebrities, attended a gala event with around 350 guests that established the funds necessary to build the stadium.

In 1993, the Javelinas of the newly renamed Texas A&M University–Kingsville" began competing with other LSC teams in NCAA Division II baseball. A year later, the school christened the 4,000-seat stadium as Nolan Ryan Field in honor of the Texas pitching legend's efforts to build the stadium.

In addition, Texas A&M University–Kingsville established a competitive softball team in 1993. Within a four years, the popular sport was able to build a stadium of its own. In 1997, the Lady Javelinas softball team opened the stadium with a win against Incarnate Word. By 2001, the team set NCAA Division II records in softball attendance.

== Facilities ==
- Baseball – Nolan Ryan Field
- Basketball – Hampton Inn Court at the Steinke Physical Education Center
- Football – Javelina Stadium
- Golf – L.E. Ramey Golf Course in Kingsville
- Rodeo – Texas Tech Equestrian Center/Dub Parks Memorial Arena
- Softball – Vernie and Blanche Hubert Field
- Track and field – Javelina Stadium
- Volleyball – Hampton Inn Court at the Steinke Physical Education Center

== Championships ==
The Javelinas have a long history of success in regional and national competition. In addition to being one of the most accomplished teams in the NAIA and NCAA Division II sports, the university has earned numerous division, conference, and national-championship flags and trophies.

=== National ===
The Javelina Football team has won seven national championships in the NAIA: 1979, 1976, 1975, 1974, 1970, 1969, and 1959. They were the runner-up in the NCAA Division II National Football Championship in 1994.

=== Conference ===
==== Football ====
The university's football team has earned 34 conference championships: 1931, 1932, 1938, 1939, 1941, 1951, 1952, 1959, 1960, 1962, 1967–70, 1974–77, 1979, 1985, 1987–89, 1992–97, 2001–04, and 2009.

==== Baseball ====
Since baseball was reinstated as a varsity sport at Texas A&M University–Kingsville in 1993, the Javelina baseball team has earned four LSC championships: 1995, 1998, 2004, 2008, 2014, and 2015. The baseball team also has one appearance in the NCAA Division II College World Series in 2018.

=== Division ===
Since the creation of the LSC South Division in 1997, the Javelina football team has won seven LSC South Division Championships: 1997, 1998, 2001, 2002, 2003, 2004, and 2009.

=== Tournaments ===
==== Softball ====
The Javelina softball team has participated in three NCAA Division II championship tournaments: 2003, 2004, 2007 and 2019.

==== Men's basketball ====
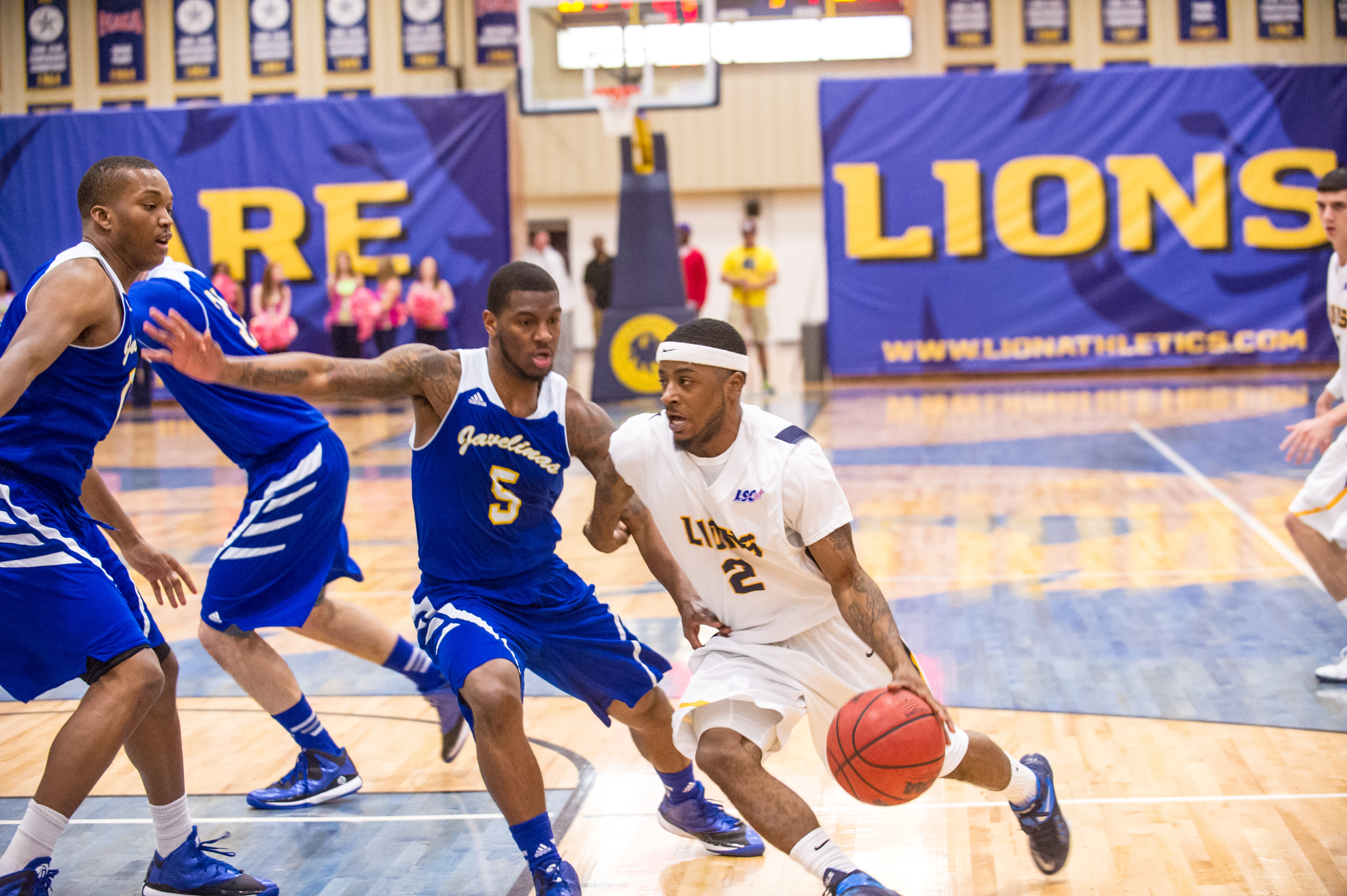
The Javelinas men's basketball team in action against Texas A&M–Commerce in 2015

The Javelina men's basketball team has made deep runs in four NCAA Division II championship tournaments: 2009, 2004, 1996, and 1992.

==== Women's basketball ====
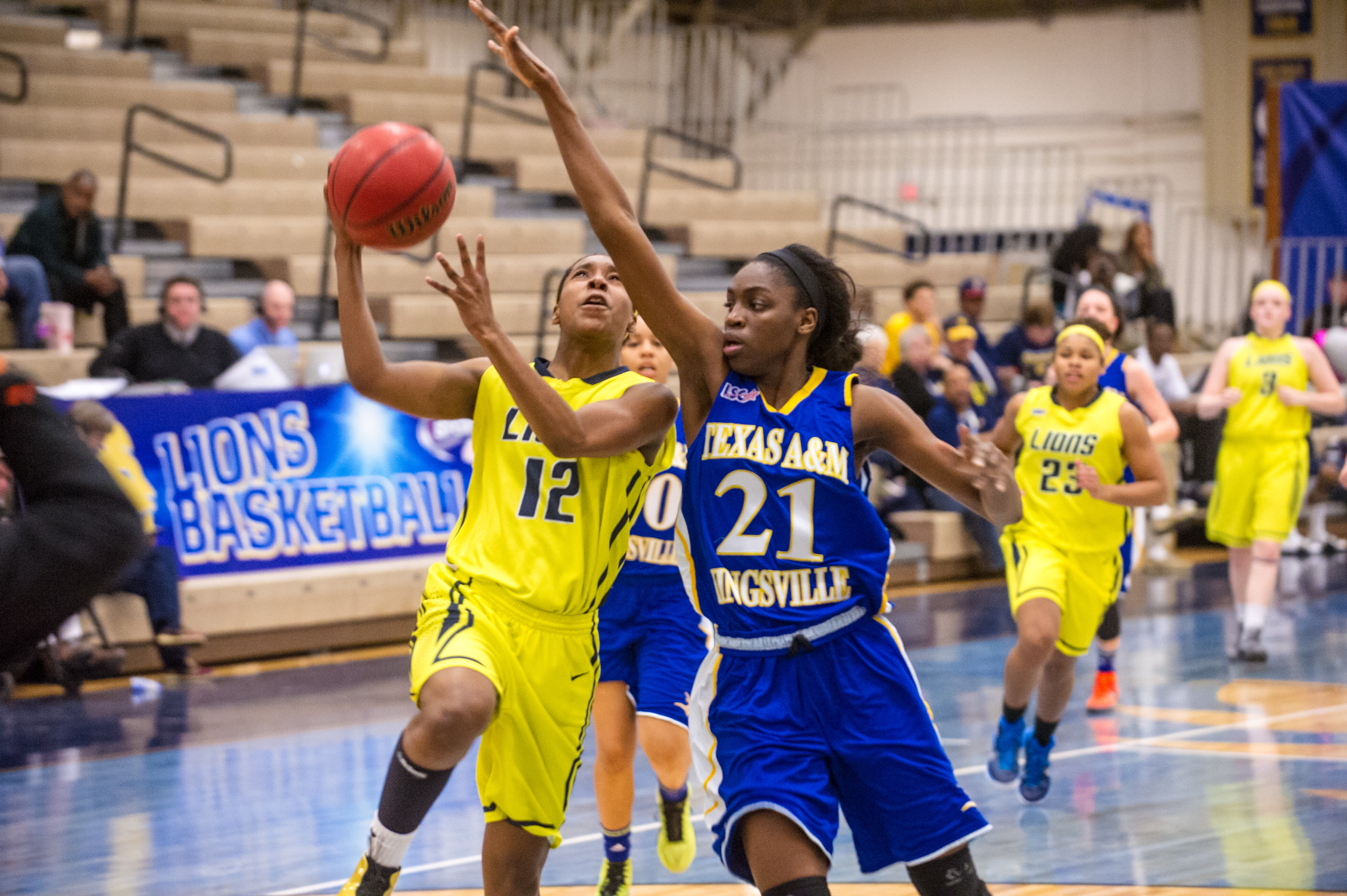
The Lady Javelinas in action against the Texas A&M–Commerce Lions in 2015

The Lady Javelinas basketball team has participated in three NCAA Division II championship tournaments: 2001, 2000, and 1983. In 2001, the Lady Javelinas advanced to the NCAA Elite 8 game.

==== Men's track and field ====
The men's track and field team won NCAA Division II outdoor track and field national championships in 2018. The men's track and field squad won the IBC Bank Cactus Cup in 2010.

== Traditions ==
Texas A&M University–Kingsville has a long history of athletic traditions. Since the university was established in 1925, the school placed an emphasis on traditions that united students in institutional and organizational identity.

=== Current ===
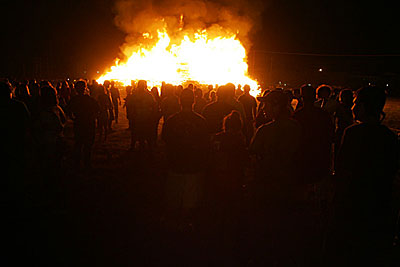
Homecoming Bonfire at Texas A&M University–Kingsville

Tailgate party before Javelina football game

- School colors: The school's official colors are royal blue and gold, which are reflected around the campus. They are seen in the uniforms of athletes, coaches, and band members. They are also found on flags and school apparel, and are proudly worn during sporting events.
- Alma mater: The official song of the university, "Hail AMK", is sung following each football game.
- School songs: The official fight song for TAMUK, is "Jalisco", is played by the band following every touchdown. In addition, the "Javelina Victory March" is played after every field goal or extra point. Other songs are played during the games, often followed by a chant of "Go Hogs Go!"
- Pride of South Texas Marching Band: This is the award-winning marching band of the school. The band has participated in competitions throughout Texas and the United States. They routinely perform during halftime of home football games. In addition, the band plays the school's alma mater at the end of football games.
- Bonfire: During homecoming week, a large bonfire is held in a field located adjacent to the soccer field and softball stadium. The bonfire is sponsored by the Aggie Club and is open to the student body, faculty, staff, and alumni of the university.
- Homecoming King and Queen: In the weeks preceding the homecoming, members of various student organizations campaign for King and Queen. Students vote for the candidates of their choice, and the results are announced during halftime at the Homecoming Game.
- Tailgate party: A tailgate party is hosted in the northeastern parking lot of Javelina Stadium before each home football game. These gatherings have become a normal part of Javelina football games and attract thousands of fans. The tailgate party is open to the public and many student organizations, clubs, and surrounding businesses around the area choose to participate with food, drinks, and music.
- Army ROTC: The cadets of Javelina Battalion present colors during official school functions. Javelina Battalion upholds several internal traditions, including the firing of "Old Smokey" (prior to 1965, cadets fired a cannon known as "Little Jav") during home football games, as well as sponsoring the Military Ball each year since 1975.
- Hog Calls: Enthusiastic rallies are held before the 1st Home Game, Family Weekend and Homecoming games.
- Blue Out: During home games, students are encouraged to participate in a "Blue Out" – where students wear their school colors in a sign of school spirit.
- Porky's Pack and Train: Children who become members of Porky's Pack accompany Porky the Javelina mascot on a train ride around the stadium throughout the game.
- Blue Thunder: Prior to kickoff, students sitting on the west side of the stadium repeatedly kick the metal rails beneath their seats in a sign of school solidarity, resulting in a thunderous clamor.
- Flag Run: Following each touchdown scored by the Javelinas, two separate school flags are run around the stadium by members of the Aggie Club.
- Tortilla toss: During the 1980s, students began to throw tortillas following every touchdown as a show of support for the football team. This tradition was halted in 1999 after some students complained of possible racial undertones. School officials subsequently banned tortillas from the stadium; however, tortillas continue to be thrown during the game.
- College Hall black lights: Following each football victory, the bell tower atop College Hall is lit up with black lights to provide an ethereal reminder to the campus community of each victory.

=== Athletes ===
- Rally Entry: The Javelina athletic teams choose to make a scenic entry to football, basketball, baseball, and softball games.
- Prayer in the End Zone: An unofficial football tradition, many of the players from various religious backgrounds immediately head to the north end zone (near the scoreboard) following entrance into the stadium. These players kneel in silent prayer. Following the game, many players (from both the Javelinas and visiting teams) choose to meet at the 50-yard-line and pray.
- Alma mater: The Javelina football team joins the students on the western bleachers in the singing of the school's alma mater.
- Children's Hospital: At various times throughout the year, members of the various Javelina teams accompany Porky the Javelina costumed mascot and visit local hospitals, including the Driscoll Children's Hospital.

=== Mascots ===
- Mascot: The javelina is the official mascot of Texas A&M University–Kingsville. The a live mascot is paraded during official school events and games. Over the years, various mascots named Henry, Henrietta, Little Henry, Scrappy, and Porky have held the honor as official mascot. The current mascot is named Porky III.
- Porky and Baby: The university has two costumed mascots who represent the university at public functions and encourage crowd involvement during athletic events. "Porky" is the original and male javelina mascot. Several years ago, he was joined by "Baby", a female javelina mascot.

=== Rivalries ===
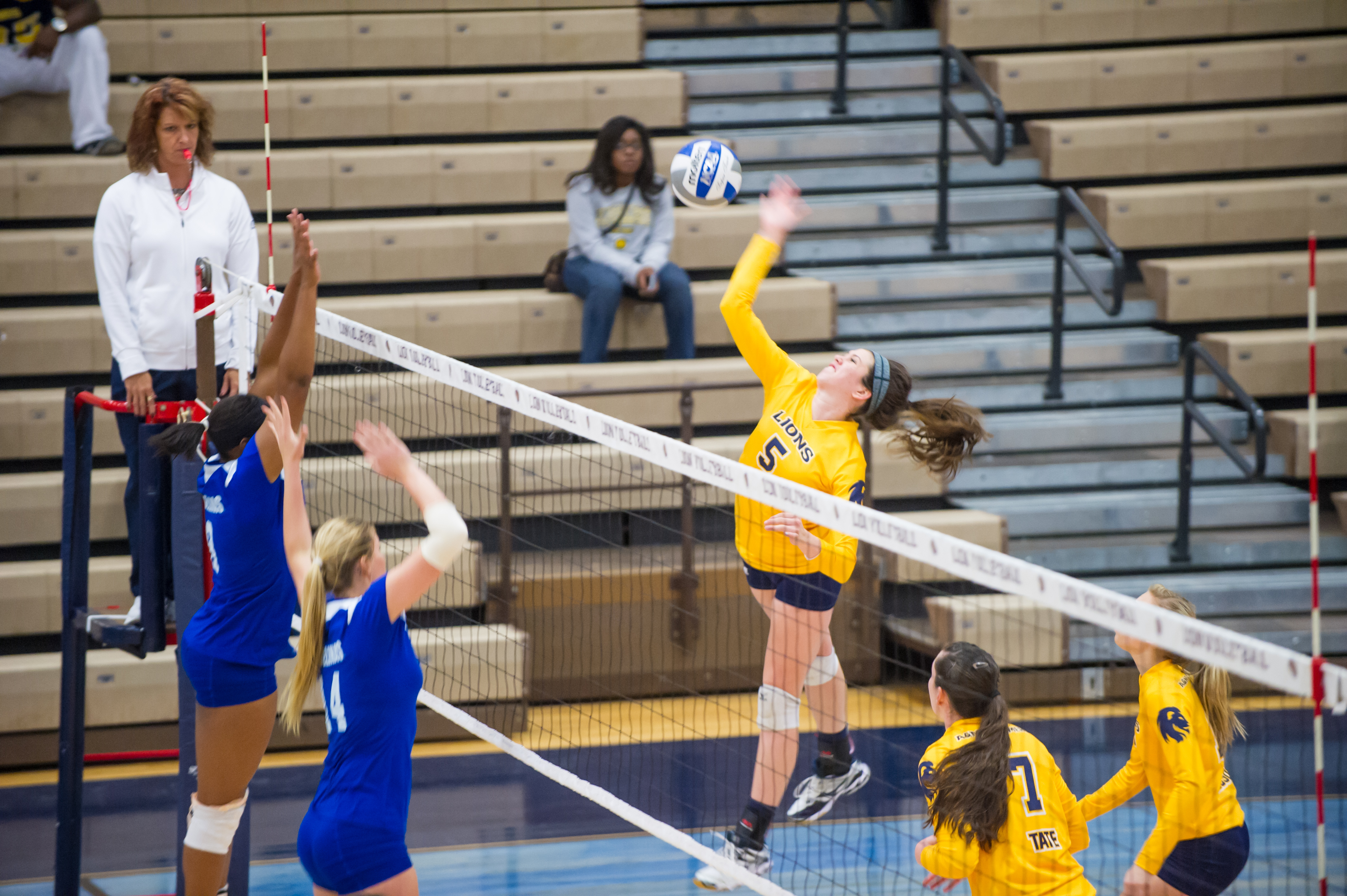
The Javelinas volleyball team in action against the Texas A&M–Commerce Lions in 2014

List of rivalries.

- East Texas A&M University
- Tarleton State University
- University of Central Oklahoma
- Abilene Christian University
- West Texas A&M University
- University of North Alabama
- University of California, Davis
- Northwest Missouri State University

== People ==
=== Personnel - head coaches ===
- Autumn Williams, Women's Tennis
- Mike Salinas, Football
- Jason Gonzales, Baseball
- Orlando Salinas, Softball
- Johnny Estelle, Men's Basketball
- Michael Madrid, Women's Basketball
- Tanya Allen, Volleyball/Beach Volleyball
- Stefanie Gray, Golf
- Ryan Dahl, Track and Field/Cross Country

=== Notable alumni ===
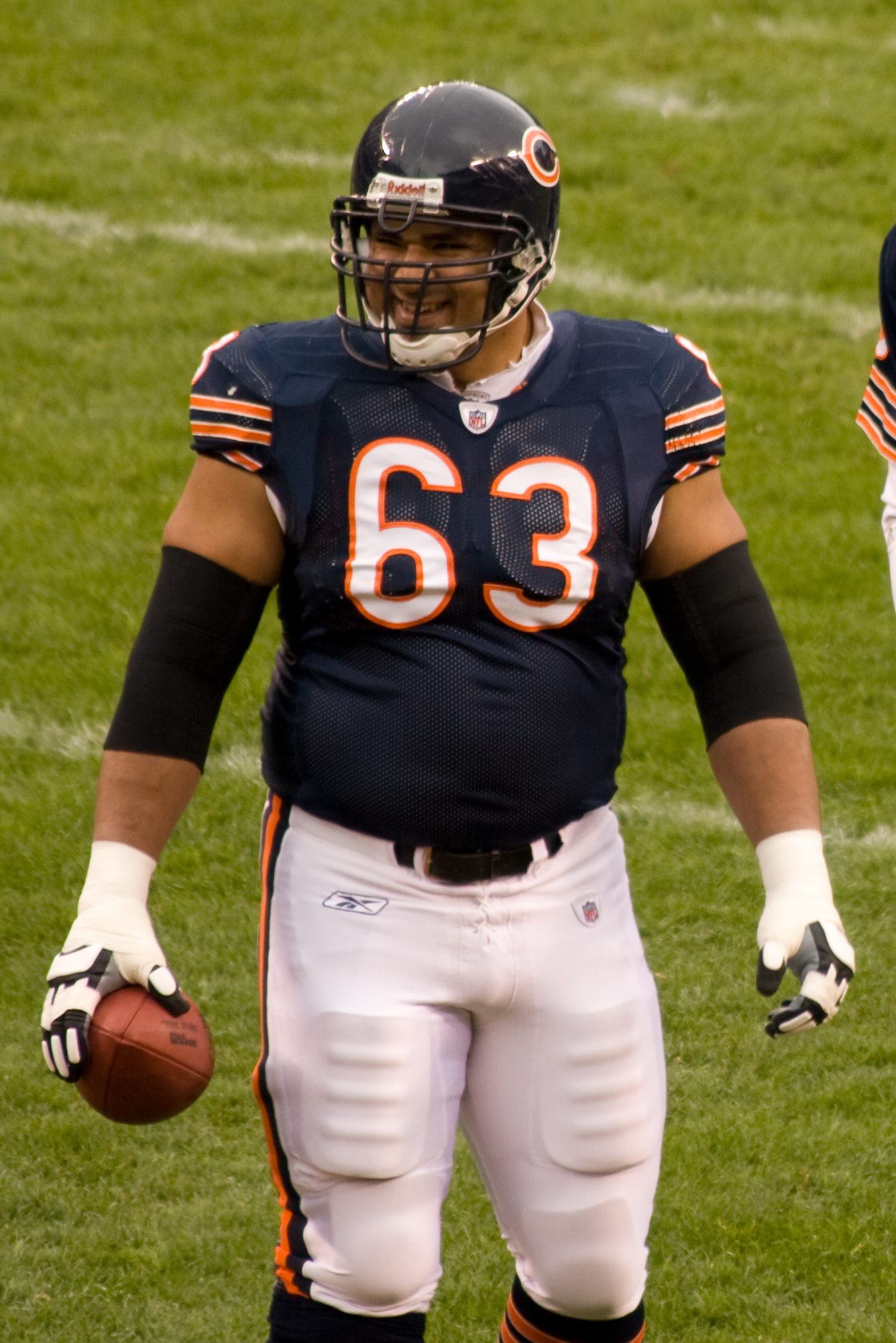
Roberto Garza

Stu Clarkson

- Stu Clarkson, NFL linebacker for the Chicago Bears, Texas A&M - Kingsville Football Hall of Fame
- Juan Castillo NFL coach, defensive co-ordinator Philadelphia Eagles
- Roberto Garza, NFL lineman for the Chicago Bears
- Darrell Green, Pro Football Hall of Famer, retired cornerback
- Al Harris, NFL cornerback for the Green Bay Packers
- Jim Hill, former NFL player for the Green Bay Packers and San Diego Chargers, sports anchor at KCBS-TV in Los Angeles
- Jermane Mayberry, NFL guard for the New Orleans Saints
- John Randle, retired NFL Hall of Fame defensive tackle
- Heath Sherman, retired NFL [running back] for the Philadelphia Eagles
- Gil Steinke, NFL defensive back Philadelphia Eagles, longtime coach of the Javelinas. Texas Sports Hall of Fame
- Gene Upshaw, Pro Football Hall of Famer, former executive director of the National Football League Players Association
- Johnny Bailey, former NFL running back
- Randy Johnson, inaugural NFL quarterback for the Atlanta Falcons
- Martin Patton, former CFL running back
- Raquel Rodriguez, professional wrestler, multi-time champion in WWE.
