= Jorge Diaz (American football) =

American football player (born 1973)

No. 64
- Position: Offensive tackle

Personal information
- Born: November 15, 1973 (age 52); New York, New York, U.S.
- Listed height: 6 ft 4 in (1.93 m)
- Listed weight: 308 lb (140 kg)

Career information
- High school: Katy (Katy, Texas)
- College: Kilgore College (1992-93); Texas A&M-Kingsville
- NFL draft: 1996: undrafted

Career history
- Tampa Bay Buccaneers (1996–1999); Dallas Cowboys (2000); Tampa Bay Storm (2004); Austin Wranglers (2004)

Awards and highlights
- ArenaBowl champion (2003); All-LSC (1995)

Career NFL statistics
- Games played: 61
- Games started: 45
- Fumble recoveries: 2
- Stats at Pro Football Reference
- Stats at ArenaFan.com

Jorge Diaz (born November 15, 1973) is an American former professional football player who was an offensive tackle in the National Football League (NFL) for the Tampa Bay Buccaneers and Dallas Cowboys. He also was a member of the Tampa Bay Storm and Austin Wranglers of the Arena Football League (AFL). He played college football for the Texas A&M–Kingsville Javelinas.

== Early life ==
Diaz was born in New York City and raised in Katy, Texas. He attended Katy High School, where he received All-district and All-conference honors at offensive tackle as a senior.

After graduation he moved on to Kilgore Junior College, where he was a two-time All-conference and junior college All-American at offensive tackle. After his sophomore season he transferred to Division II Texas A&M University–Kingsville, where his position coach was future NFL coach Juan Castillo. He became a starter as a junior and was part of an offensive line that included Jermane Mayberry and Kevin Dogins. He earned All-conference honors as a senior.

In 2017, he was inducted into the Kilgore College Athletic Hall of Fame.

== Professional career ==
=== Tampa Bay Buccaneers ===
Diaz was signed as an undrafted free agent by the Tampa Bay Buccaneers after the 1996 NFL draft on April 22. He made the roster after passing Stephen Ingram on the depth chart. He started 5 games at left guard, after Jim Pyne suffered a sprained ankle and one game at right guard, while allowing only 1.5 sacks.

In 1997, he became a regular starter at right guard in the first 13 games, moving to left guard for the last 3 contests. He was a part of a rushing attack that included running backs Mike Alstott and Warrick Dunn. In 1998, he started the first 12 games at left guard, before missing the rest of the season with a broken left foot.

In 1999, he started the first 11 games at left guard, before being passed on the depth chart by his former college teammate, Kevin Dogins. He returned to the starting lineup for the season finale against the Chicago Bears and the playoffs. He was waived on March 17, 2000.

=== Dallas Cowboys ===
On March 31, 2000, he signed as a free agent with the Dallas Cowboys, appearing in 9 games as a reserve player. He was released on March 1, 2001.

=== Tampa Bay Storm ===
On October 30, 2003, he was signed by the Tampa Bay Storm of the Arena Football League. February 2, 2004, he was placed on the injured reserve list. On March 19, he was placed on the injured reserve list. He was waived on April 14.

=== Austin Wranglers ===
On April 27, 2004, he was signed by the Austin Wranglers of the AFL.

== Personal life ==
After retiring from football, Diaz became a franchise owner of Fleming's Prime Steakhouse & Wine Bar in Tampa. He also occasionally provided “game day” analysis on the Buccaneers for local FOX affiliate Channel 13. His Father Ken Diaz played for the Edmonton Eskimos in the Canadian Football League.
