= Richard Ritchie =

American football player (born 1955)

Richard Ritchie (born May 2, 1955) is a former American football quarterback who played college football for Texas A&I from 1973 to 1976. During his career, Ritchie had an undefeated record of 39–0. After winning in his only start during his freshman year of 1973, Texas A&I won three consecutive National Association of Intercollegiate Athletics Division I national championships. Between passing and running, he scored 59 touchdowns in his career; he also served as a placekicker for Texas A&I. Following his playing career, Ritchie was an assistant coach from 1977 to 1984 for three teams: Texas, North Texas, and Texas Tech. In 1998, Ritchie was inducted into the College Football Hall of Fame.
