= KTAI =

Radio station in Kingsville, Texas

KTAI-FM

- Manning Hall and the KTAI radio tower
- Kingsville, Texas; United States
- Broadcast area: Kingsville-Alice-Falfurrias
- Frequencies: 91.1 MHz campus Cable TV ch. 2

Programming
- Format: College/Oldies/Country/Hip-Hop/Rock and Roll

Ownership
- Owner: Texas A&M University-Kingsville

History
- First air date: February 23, 1970
- Former frequencies: 91.9 MHz (1970–1975)
- Call sign meaning: K-Texas A & I University (1967–1993) (Before becoming part of the Texas A&M University System

Technical information
- Licensing authority: FCC
- Facility ID: 65304
- Class: A
- ERP: 100 watts
- HAAT: 30.0 meters (98.4 ft)
- Transmitter coordinates: 27°31′24.00″N 97°52′42.00″W

Links
- Public license information: Public file; LMS
- Webcast: Listen live

KTAI (91.1FM) is a radio station licensed to Kingsville, Texas, United States. The station serves the Kingsville-Alice-Falfurrias area and is owned by Texas A&M University-Kingsville.

== History ==
KTAI-FM began as a closed circuit radio broadcast at Texas A&M University-Kingsville (then called Texas A&I University) in 1969. In 1970, the station upgraded into a full broadcast FM radio station on 91.9 MHz; KTAI was moved to 91.1 MHz in January 1975 as the result of a new international treaty with Mexico, being the only station in the United States relocated under its provisions. KTAI is a student-operated radio station that provides a mix of music, news and live sports programming. KTAI is currently the only radio station in Kingsville, Texas.

As Kingsville's only radio station, KTAI is a student-operated radio station that provides a mix of music, news and live sports programming. The school also offers a campus television station, TAMUK TV-2, which is aired throughout the campus and via local Educational-access television cable TV channel 2. Like KTAI, TAMUK TV-2 offers students the opportunity to work in various aspects and roles of broadcast media while earning college credit. Many students have moved on to work in radio and television throughout Texas. Both KTAI and TAMUK TV-2 are operated under the auspices of the Radio and Television division of the Art Communications Theater Arts Department.

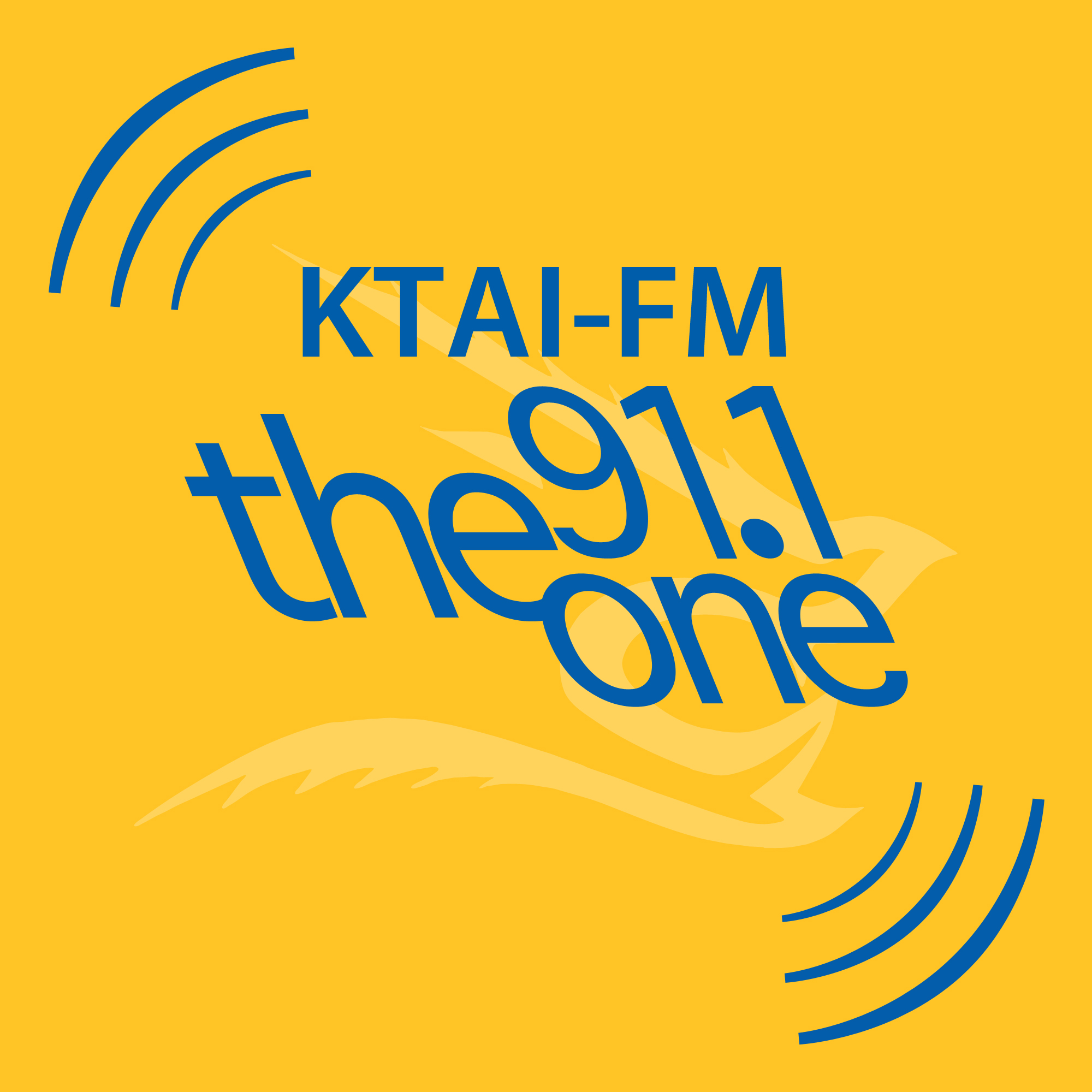
Former logo

In Fall 2011, KTAI began streaming online in HD. They also joined RadioFlag, a social media and content discovery platform for radio at the same time.

== Awards ==
KTAI won the first ever Spirit of College Radio Day Award presented by College Radio Day in Fall 2011. In Spring 2012, KTAI won yet another "first" of a RadioFlag sponsored competition for college radio stations. On-Air personality Roughneck Rich, along with three others, won in the category for Best Music Show.

== See also ==
- List of college radio stations in the United States
