= The South Texan =

Texas A&M student newspaper

- Type: Weekly newspaper
- Owner: Texas A&M University-Kingsville
- President: format = Broadsheet
- Founded: 1925
- Headquarters: Kingsville, Texas
- Website: The South Texan

The South Texan is the weekly student newspaper of Texas A&M University-Kingsville. The newspaper was founded in 1925 to provide students with knowledge and experience in print media while offering relevant news to the university campus. It is run entirely by students at Texas A&M University-Kingsville, with limited oversight by a faculty advisor.

The South Texan has produced a distinguished list of former students who are working in broadcast and print journalism throughout Texas and elsewhere in the United States.

== Honors ==
The South Texan has received numerous honors, awards and accolades by various agencies and media organizations. The newspaper has been honored by the Texas Intercollegiate Press Association (TIPA), the Houston Press Club, the Associated Collegiate Press and several other media oversight outlets.

== See also ==
- List of student newspapers in the United States of America
