= Nolan Ryan Field =

Baseball venue in Kingsville, Texas, US

Coordinates: 27.529435°N 97.881523°W

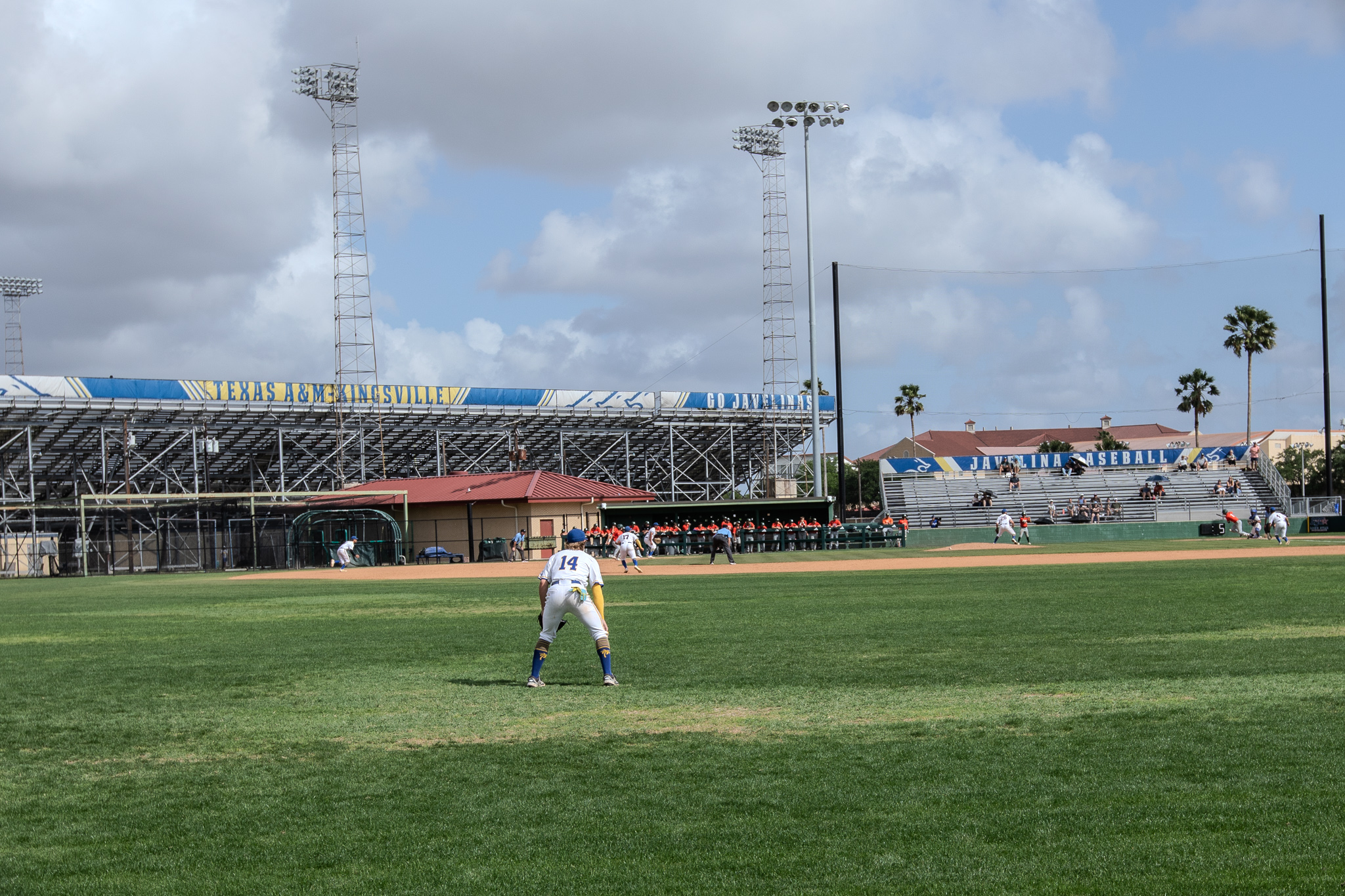
- Baseball field in Kingsville, Texas named in honor of Hall of Fame pitcher Nolan Ryan.
- Interactive map of Nolan Ryan Field
- Full name: Nolan Ryan Field
- Location: Kingsville, Texas
- Owner: Texas A&M University–Kingsville
- Operator: Texas A&M University–Kingsville
- Capacity: 4,000
- Field size: 330 LF; 375 LCF; 400 CF; 375 RCF; 330 RF

Construction
- Opened: 1994

Tenant
- TAMU-Kingsville (1994- ) (Lone Star Conference)

Nolan Ryan Field is a baseball venue located in Kingsville, Texas, and has been the home of the TAMU-Kingsville Javalinas baseball team since 1994. The Javalinas are a member of the Lone Star Conference. The ballpark holds a capacity of 4,000 and was named after the MLB career strikeout leader and Texas pitching legend, Nolan Ryan, who aided in gathering the capital that built the stadium. In essence, this is "the house that Nolan Ryan built."
