= Juan Castillo (American football) =

American football player and coach (born 1959)

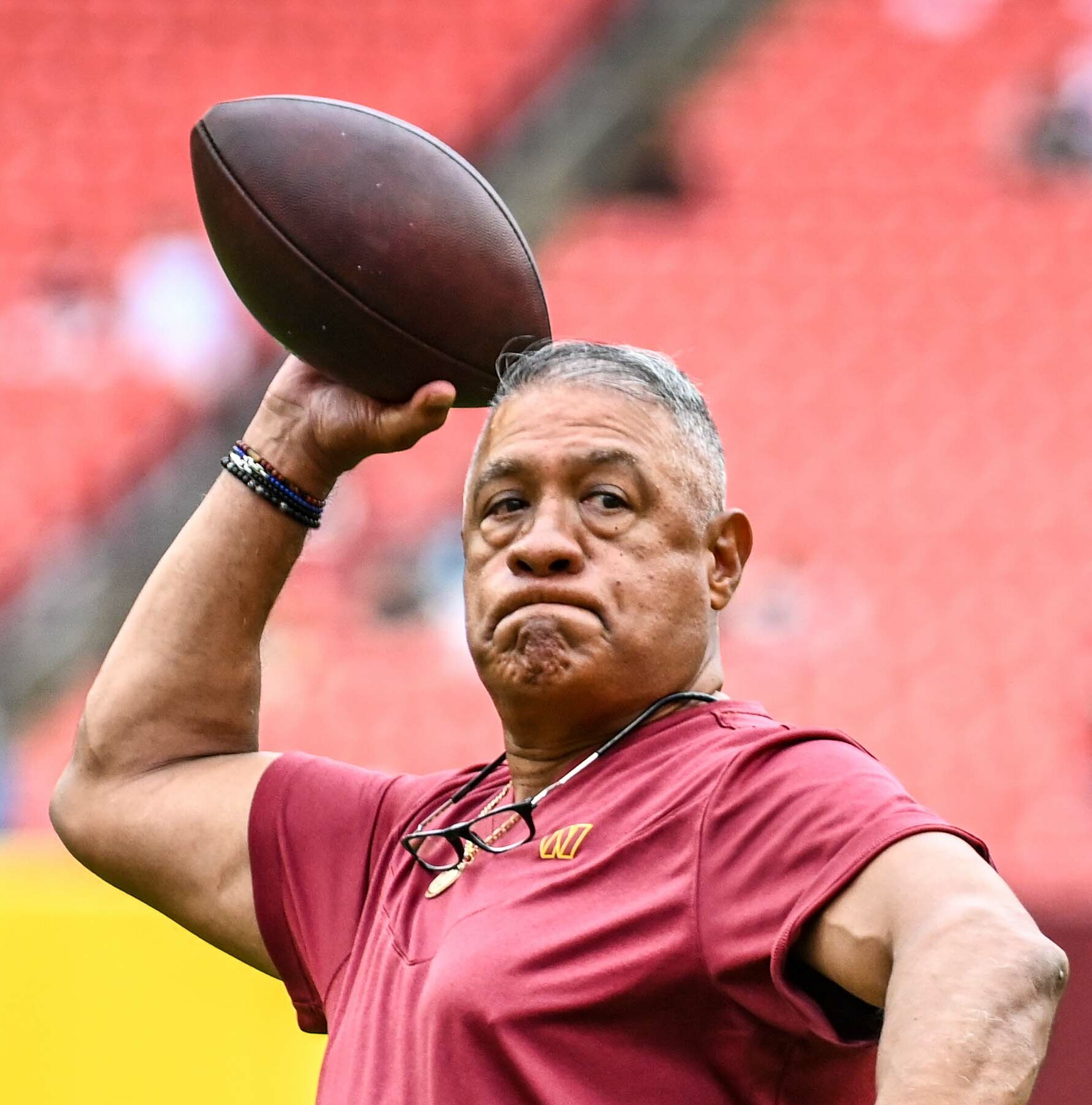
- Castillo in 2022

Syracuse Orange
- Title: Offensive line coach

Personal information
- Born: October 8, 1959 (age 67); Port Isabel, Texas, U.S.

Career information
- College: Texas A&I
- NFL draft: 1981: undrafted

Career history

Playing
- San Antonio Gunslingers (1984–1985)

Coaching
- Texas A&M–Kingsville (1982–1985) Defensive line coach & linebackers coach; Henrietta M. King High School (1986–1989) Defensive coordinator & linebackers coach; Texas A&M–Kingsville (1990–1994) Offensive line coach; Philadelphia Eagles (1995–1996) Offensive assistant; Philadelphia Eagles (1997) Tight ends coach; Philadelphia Eagles (1998–2010) Offensive line coach; Philadelphia Eagles (2011–2012) Defensive coordinator; Baltimore Ravens (2013) Run game coordinator; Baltimore Ravens (2014–2016) Offensive line coach; Buffalo Bills (2017–2018) Offensive line coach & run game coordinator; Michigan (2019) Offensive analyst; Chicago Bears (2020–2021) Offensive line coach; Washington Commanders (2022) Tight ends coach; Washington Commanders (2023) Run game coordinator; UCLA (2024) Offensive line coach; Michigan (2025) Senior assistant offensive line coach; Syracuse (2026–present) Offensive line coach
- Coaching profile at Pro Football Reference

Juan Castillo (born October 8, 1959) is an American football coach who is currently the offensive line coach for the Syracuse Orange. He played college football at Texas A&I as a linebacker and played for the San Antonio Gunslingers of the United States Football League (USFL) in the mid-1980s. Castillo then coached high school and college football before joining the Eagles in 1995 as an offensive assistant. He has served as both a coach for tight ends and offensive line.

== College career ==
Castillo earned a scholarship worth $500 to attend Texas A&I after spending a semester at the Monterrey Institute of Technology and Higher Education, where he played for the Borregos Salvajes Monterrey. He played linebacker at Texas A&I.

== Professional career ==
Castillo played for the San Antonio Gunslingers of the USFL from 1984–1985, mainly on special teams. In 1984, Castillo saw action in six games, making four tackles and three assists. In 1985, Castillo played in seven games, making eight tackles and registering three assists on a 5–13 club.

== Coaching career ==
=== H.M. King High School ===
Castillo coached linebackers and was the defensive line coach at Henrietta M. King High School from 1986 to 1989.

=== Texas A&M University–Kingsville ===
Castillo was the defensive line coach for Texas A&M University–Kingsville from 1982 to 1985 and from 1990 to 1994 he was the offensive line coach. Four offensive linemen he coached ended up in the NFL: Jermane Mayberry, Jorge Diaz, Kevin Dogins, and Earl Dotson.

=== Philadelphia Eagles ===
The Philadelphia Eagles hired Castillo as an offensive assistant in 1995 under Ray Rhodes. In 1996, the Eagles drafted Jermane Mayberry, an offensive lineman Castillo coached at Texas A&M University–Kingsville, in the first round of the 1996 NFL draft. Castillo was promoted to tight ends coach in 1997, and switched to coaching the offensive line in 1998. When Andy Reid was hired as the head coach of the Eagles in 1999, he retained Castillo on the coaching staff. Mayberry earned a Pro Bowl berth in 2002, and said Castillo "molded me into the player I became." Castillo coached the offensive line for thirteen seasons, from 1998 to 2010.

Castillo became the defensive coordinator for the Eagles following the firing of Sean McDermott on February 2, 2011. The hiring was met with surprise by players, fans, and members of the media primarily because Castillo had not coached the defensive side of the ball since he was at Henrietta M. King High School in 1989. Castillo was fired on October 16, 2012.

=== Baltimore Ravens ===
On January 21, 2013, Castillo was hired as a consultant by the Baltimore Ravens. At the time of the hiring, the Ravens were preparing to play in Super Bowl XLVII. Castillo would officially join the coaching staff for the 2013 season as the run-game coordinator and held the job for one season, before serving as the offensive line coach from 2014 to 2016.

=== Buffalo Bills ===
In 2017, Castillo was hired by the Buffalo Bills to become the offensive line coach and run-game coordinator under new head coach Sean McDermott. He served two seasons with the Bills before being dismissed following the 2018 season.

=== Michigan ===
Castillo joined the Michigan Wolverines coaching staff as an offensive analyst for the 2019 season. As part of his duties, Castillo worked with Michigan offensive line coach Ed Warinner.

=== Chicago Bears ===
Castillo was hired by the Chicago Bears as offensive line coach on January 5, 2020. The move reunited him with head coach Matt Nagy, whom he worked with in Philadelphia. He was not retained by the team following the firing of Nagy after the 2021 season.

=== Washington Commanders ===
Castillo was named tight ends coach of the Washington Commanders on February 21, 2022. He was not retained by the team following the hiring of new head coach, Dan Quinn, in the 2024 offseason.

=== UCLA ===
In March 2024, Castillo was hired by UCLA as an offensive line coach under head coach, DeShaun Foster.

=== Michigan ===
In December 2024, Castillo was hired by Michigan as an offensive analyst for the offensive line under head coach, Sherrone Moore.

=== Syracuse ===
Castillo was hired by Syracuse in 2025.

== Personal life ==
Castillo fractured his left tibial plateau after he was hit by a utility truck outside of Veterans Stadium on August 17, 1998. His hometown of Port Isabel declared July 4, 2009, to be "Juan Castillo Day". He married his wife, Kelly in 2022. He is stepfather to her two children, Franco and Vivienne.
