= Hampton Inn Court at the Steinke Physical Education Center =

Coordinates: 27°31′37″N 97°52′48″W

Gil H. Steinke Physical Education Center-Kingsville Hampton Inn Court
- Hampton Inn Court
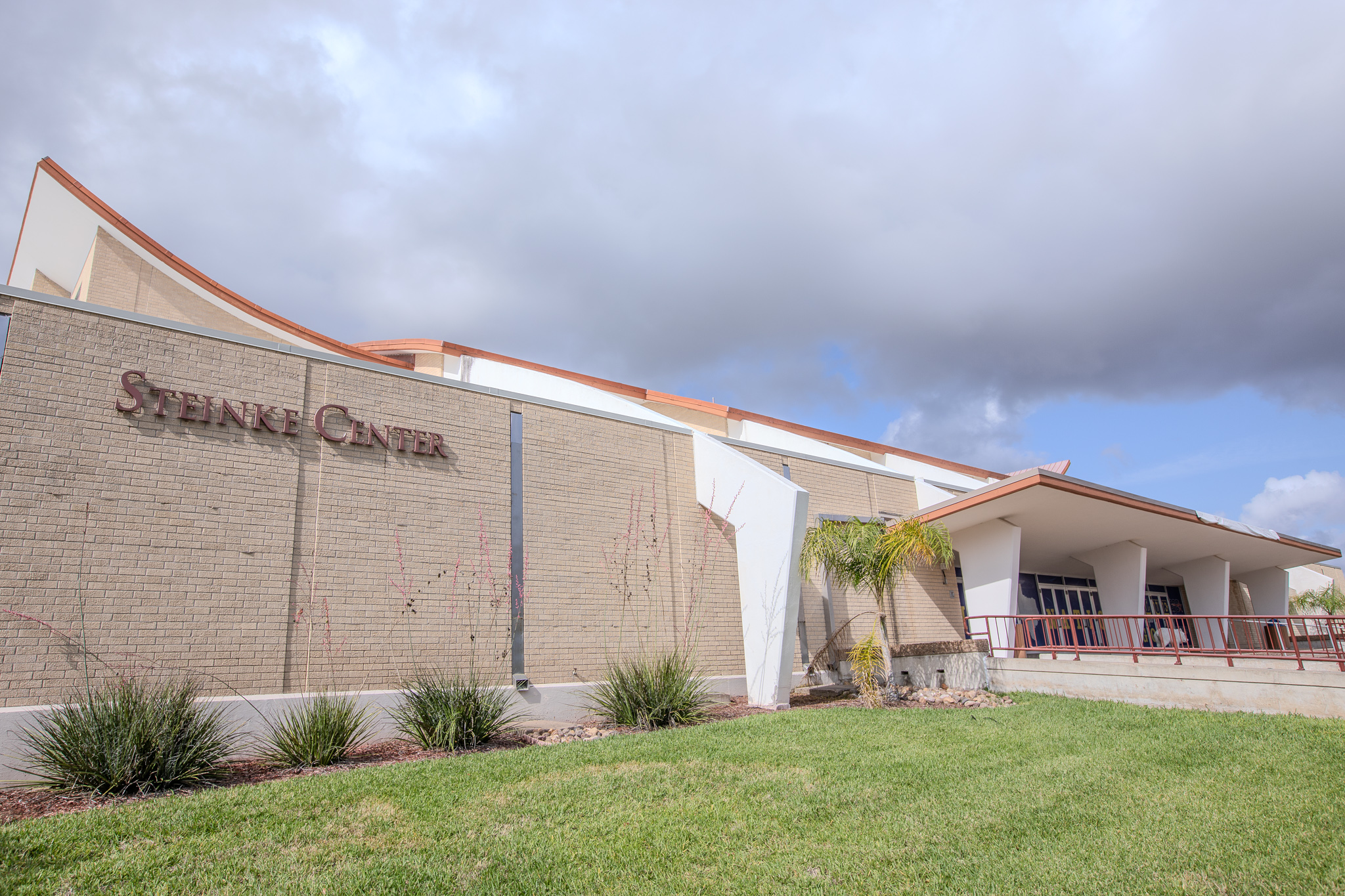
- Physical education and athletics facility at Texas A&M University Kingsville.
- Interactive map of Gil H. Steinke Physical Education Center-Kingsville Hampton Inn Court
- Location: Kingsville, Texas
- Owner: Texas A&M University–Kingsville
- Operator: Texas A&M University–Kingsville
- Capacity: 4,000

Tenant
- Texas A&M–Kingsville basketball and volleyball

The Hampton Inn Court at the Steinke Physical Education Center (SPEC) is home to Texas A&M–Kingsville Javelinas basketball and volleyball. The building was named in honor of Gil Steinke, a former athletic director and football coach at Texas A&M-Kingsville, he is in the College Football Hall of Fame.
