= Texas A&M University–Kingsville =

Public university in Kingsville, Texas

- Former names: South Texas Normal School (1917); South Texas State Teachers College (1925); Texas College of Arts and Industries (1929–1967); Texas A&I University (1967–1993)
- Type: Public research university
- Established: 1925; 101 years ago
- Parent institution: Texas A&M University System
- Endowment: $115.7 million
- President: Robert H. Vela Jr.
- Provost: James Palmer
- Faculty: 512
- Students: 6,092 (4,847 undergraduate) (fall 2022)
- Location: Kingsville, Texas, United States; 27.5251°N 97.8825°W
- Campus: Suburban, 1,600 acres (650 ha)
- Colors: Blue and Gold
- Nickname: Javelinas
- Sporting affiliations: NCAA Division II – Lone Star
- Mascot: Porky the Javelina
- Website: tamuk.edu

Texas A&M University–Kingsville is a public research university in Kingsville, Texas, United States. It is the southernmost campus of the Texas A&M University System. The university developed the nation's first doctoral degree in bilingual education. It is classified among "R2: Doctoral Universities – High research activity" and accredited by the Southern Association of Colleges and Schools (SACS).

Texas A&M University–Kingsville is the oldest continuously operating public institution of higher learning in South Texas. The school was chartered as the "South Texas Normal School" in 1917; however, the opening of the school was delayed due to World War I. Founded in 1925 as "South Texas State Teachers College", the university's name changed in 1929 to "Texas College of Arts and Industries", or "Texas A&I" for short, signaled the broadening of its mission. A 1967 name change to "Texas A&I University" marked another transition. The university became a member of the Texas A&M University System in 1989 and changed its name to Texas A&M University–Kingsville in 1993.

== Academics ==
=== Student body ===
Bell tower atop College Hall

Texas A&M University–Kingsville has a highly diverse student body with 6,357 students pursuing degrees from five academic colleges. The student body is represented by students from 40 U.S. states and more than 35 foreign countries. The student body is split almost evenly with 53% men and 47% women. Undergraduate students represent about 80% of the student population, and the student body reflects the high Hispanic population of the South Texas area. With 69% of the students belonging to a Hispanic ethnicity, 15% white, and 4% African-American, around 7% of students are international students.

=== Admission ===
As a Texas public university and a member of the Texas A&M University System, Texas A&M University–Kingsville participates in the Texas "top-10 law", which guarantees admission of the top 10% of Texas public high-school students into public colleges or universities in the state. Whereas certain Texas universities (such as the University of Texas at Austin) can limit these "top 10%" students to 75% of the incoming freshmen class via a tiered system, Texas A&M University–Kingsville offers admission to any student who graduated in the top 10%.

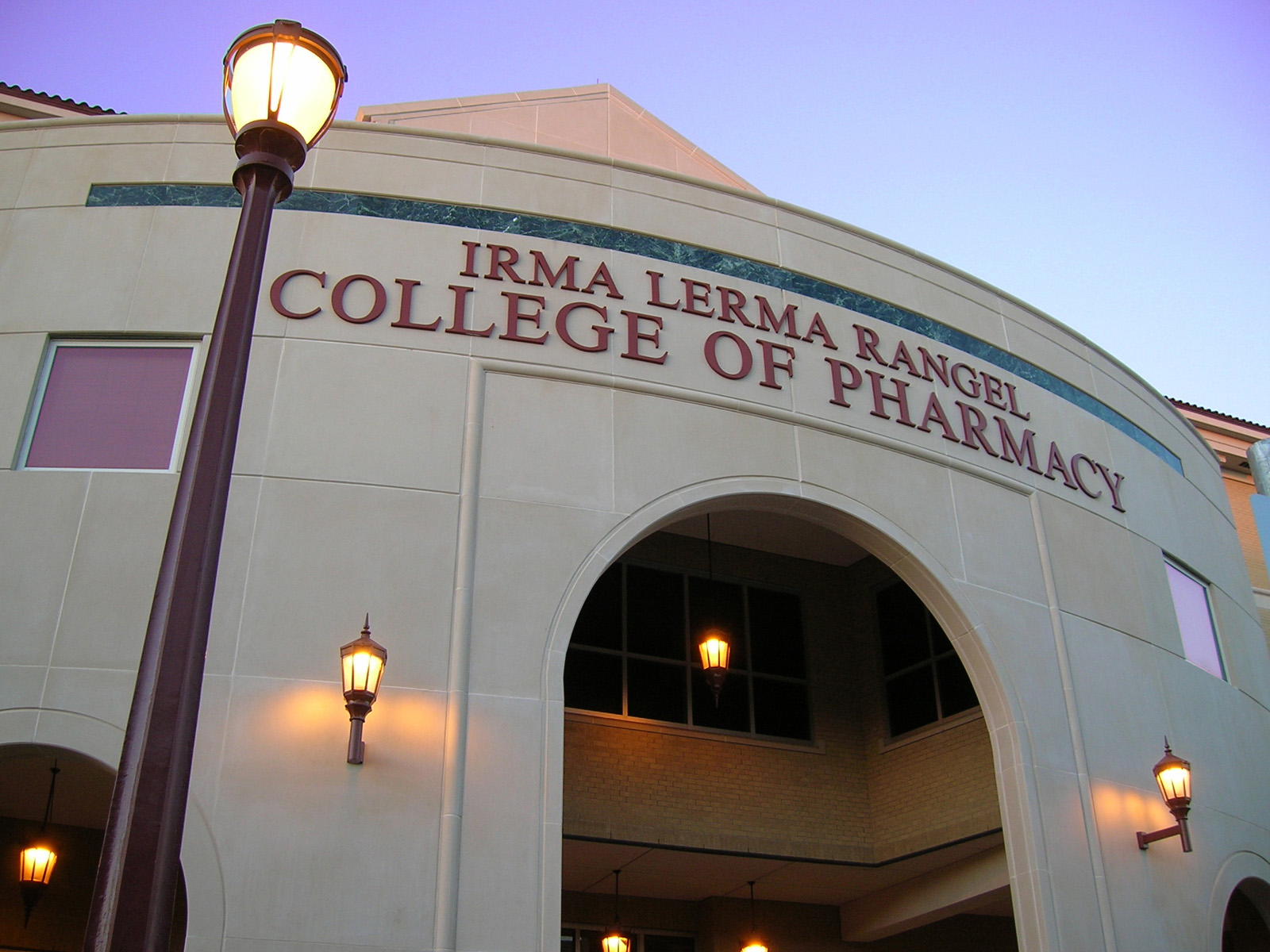
Irma Lerma Rangel College of Pharmacy on the campus

=== Faculty ===
More than 75% of the faculty hold terminal degrees (such as PhDs or Ed.D.s.) and have come to the university from more than 41 U.S. states and foreign countries. The university maintains a student/faculty ratio of 16 to one.

=== Programs ===
Texas A&M–Kingsville has 56 undergraduate degree programs, 61 master's programs and six doctoral degrees in the Colleges of Agriculture, Natural Resources and Human Sciences, Arts and Sciences, Business Administration, Education and Human Performance, Engineering, and Graduate Studies. The university features the region's only programs in engineering, social sciences and agriculture. A&M–Kingsville's bilingual education program, offering degrees at the master's and doctoral levels, was the first of its kind in the country and continues to be one of the strongest.

=== Rankings ===
Academic rankings

National
- U.S. News & World Report: 352 (tie)
- Washington Monthly: 383

Engineering Building as seen from West Avenue B

In 2006, Texas A&M Health Science Center Irma Lerma Rangel College of Pharmacy opened as the first professional school of any kind at any university south of San Antonio. The Center for Urban Education at the University of Southern California recently identified Texas A&M University–Kingsville as one of the top 25 Hispanic-serving institutions in America. The school is recognized as being "potential exemplary, or model, of effective practices for increasing the number of Latina and Latino bachelor’s degree holders in science, technology, engineering, and mathematics." Texas A&M University–Kingsville ranks 43rd out of American colleges and universities in bachelor's degrees awarded to Hispanics according to the Hispanic Outlook in Higher Education Magazine. The magazine also determined that the school ranks seventh in the nation for agriculture degrees and fifth in multi/interdisciplinary studies.

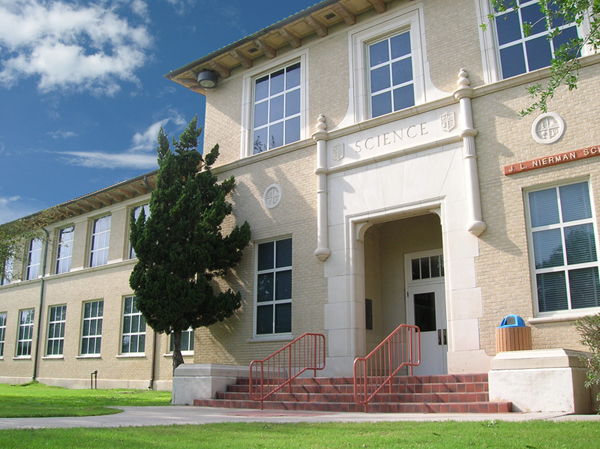
J. L. Nierman Science Hall

The university's fashion and interiors merchandising program, part of the Department of Human Sciences, was ranked as a top-10 program among schools in the Southwest by Fashion Schools in 2013. The program ranked 10th among all schools with fashion programs in Texas, Oklahoma, Arizona, New Mexico, Colorado, Utah, and Nevada and number 72 among all schools nationally.

=== Research ===
The National Natural Toxins Research Center at Texas A&M–Kingsville boasts a large collection of venomous snakes and attracts researchers from around the world to its one-of-a-kind serpentarium. For almost four decades, its mission has been to provide global research, training, and resources that will lead to the discovery of medically important toxins found in snake venoms. They also provide snake venoms, venom fractions, and tissue for biomedical research.

Texas A&M–Kingsville's Caesar Kleberg Wildlife Research Institute is internationally recognized for its research into the conservation and management of wildlife. As the leading wildlife research organization in Texas, it emphasizes research in such fields of study as habitat ecology and management, wildlife biology, ecology and management, wildlife diseases, parasitology, and toxicology, economic development of natural resources, and citizen science. Research scientists and biology and agriculture students conduct research in habitat, toxicology, genetics, and various animal programs, including deer, wild cats, and birds.

The Texas A&M University–Kingsville Citrus Center is known around the world for its work in citrus research and development. The center attracts scholars and research projects from around the world, incorporating undergraduate and graduate student training into its diverse research programs, such as biotechnology, entomology, pathology, and budwood certification. The center is also known for its research and development of several popular varieties of citrus, including the Ruby Red grapefruit.

The Wellhausen Water Resources Center, through its membership in the International Arid Lands Consortium, is playing a role in the Middle East with its expertise in water conservation and development. The newly founded South Texas Environmental Institute plans to bring regional entities together to solve environmental questions through research.

The James C. Jernigan Library is central to the university's goal of offering first-rate academic research. The collection includes more than a half million volumes and over 700,000 microfiche documents. The facility also subscribes to more than 2,200 academic and general-interest periodicals and is designated as a depository for selected U.S. government documents. The library hosts a rare book room that includes materials from throughout Texas, the Southwest, and the United States.

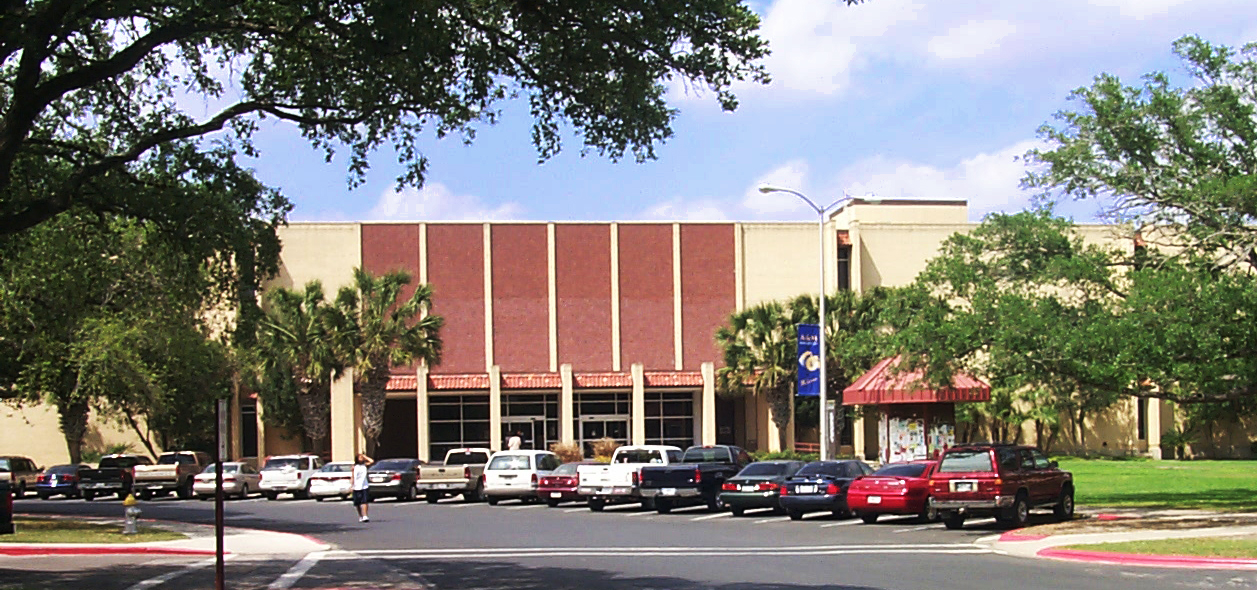
James C. Jernigan Library

The South Texas Archives and Special Collections, a division of the James C. Jernigan Library hosts one of the largest archival collections in Texas, devoted almost exclusively to the history of South Texas. The South Texas Archives are a state depository that contains the official records from many local towns, cities, special districts, courts, and other regional agencies. In addition, the archive hosts large photograph collections, thousands of written and oral histories of the region, and the collections of many local and state legislators, such as Carlos Truan, Irma Rangel, and J.T. Canales.

== Campus ==
Row of Palm trees leading to the Javelina Engineering Complex

Texas A&M–Kingsville is located in Kingsville, Texas, just 40 miles (64 km) southwest of Corpus Christi, Texas and 120 miles (190 km) north of Mexico. Kingsville, with a population of around 25,000, is home to the headquarters of the famed King Ranch and Naval Air Station Kingsville. The Kingsville campus of Texas A&M–Kingsville encompasses 1,601 acres (648 ha) of land, with the bulk of activities occurring within a 250-acre (100 ha) main campus that consists of more than 85 buildings.

College Hall after football victory as seen from Javelina statue on University Blvd.

The architecture of the main campus reflects a Spanish Mission Revival style. The school's first president, R. B. Cousins, decided that the campus should reflect the people and culture of the area. He established the tradition of having each of the buildings on campus reflect a Spanish Mission Revival style of architecture. Nearly every building on the campus has the red tile roofs, towers, and a curved-gable parapet.

The first building constructed, Manning Hall, contains an eastern tower that is a stylized version of the tower at Mission San José. The tower on the west is a replica of the tower at Mission Concepcion. The curved-gable parapet represents the Alamo, the famous former mission located in San Antonio.

In addition to the main campus, the university operates several satellite campuses around the main campus. This includes the agricultural research area to the west of campus, the TAMUK Rodeo Arena and livestock area to the north of campus, and the Tio and Janell Kleberg Wildlife Research Park adjacent to the northwestern entrance of the main campus on Corral Avenue.

Lamps align alongside University Blvd.

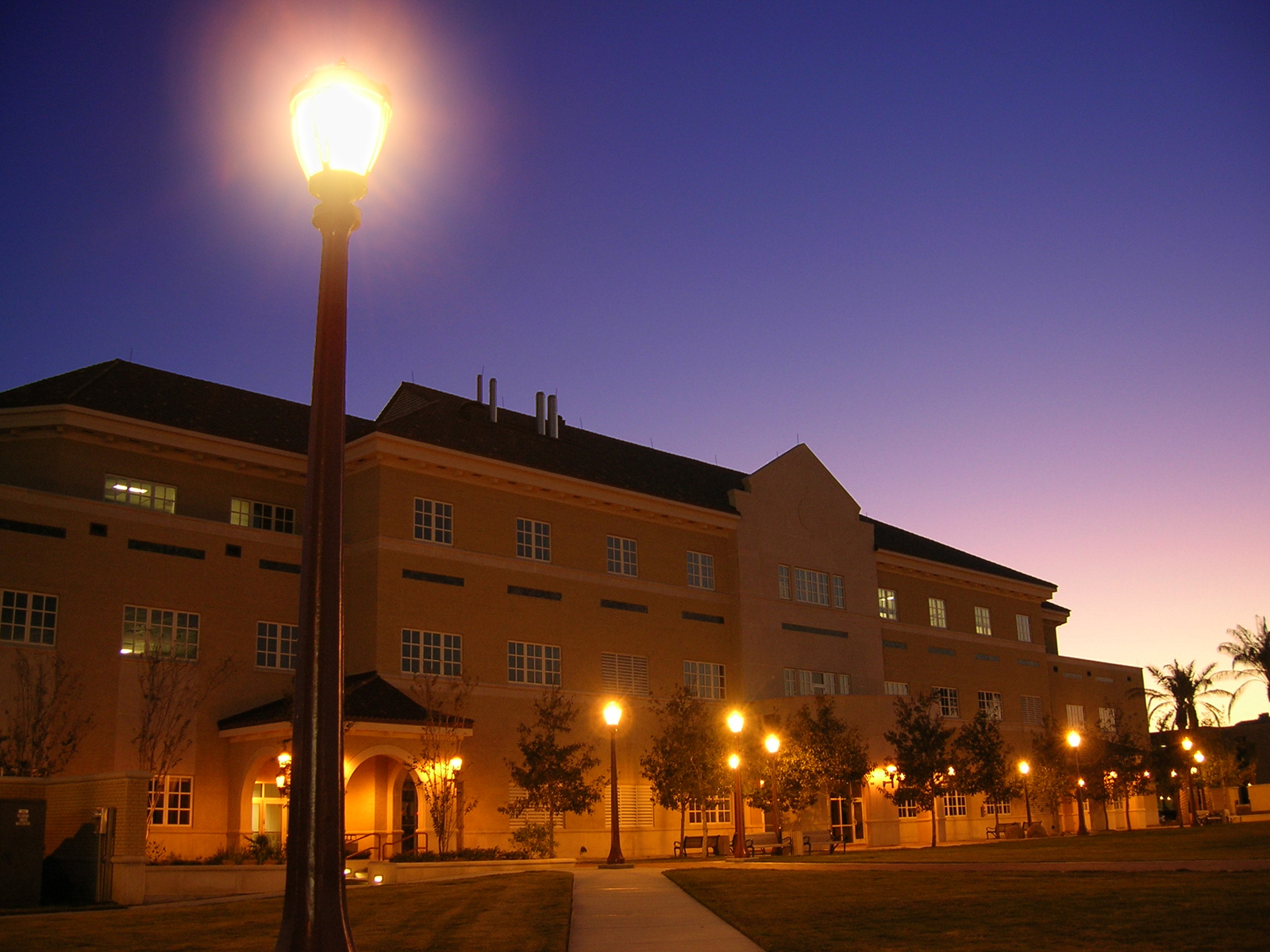
Pharmacy complex with Business Administration building in the background

The university recently developed a new master plan for the campus. In May 2010, details of the plan were released to the public. This plan calls for a multimillion-dollar improvement of the current campus infrastructure along with the development of several new buildings, walkways, green spaces, and parking additions. In addition to new and improved structures, the campus will undergo a campus beautification project that will include new signs, lighting, landscaping, and remodeling of existing outdoor facilities.

In addition, Texas A&M–Kingsville maintains two large research farms known as the Texas A&M University–Kingsville Citrus Center in Weslaco. Scientists and researchers at the center seek to find innovative solutions for the global citrus industry while developing variations in citrus (such as the 'Ruby Red', 'Star Ruby', and 'Rio Red' grapefruit varieties) through cutting-edge scientific techniques. Poteet Hall houses the Santa Gertrudis Independent School District's comprehensive high school, Santa Gertrudis Academy High School.

== Student life ==
Undergraduate demographics as of Fall 2023
Race and ethnicity	Total
Hispanic	76%
White	15%
Black	4%
International student	2%
Asian	1%
Two or more races	1%
Economic diversity
Low-income (Note: The percentage of students who received an income-based federal Pell grant intended for low-income students.)	57%
Affluent (Note: The percentage of students who are a part of the American middle class at the bare minimum.)	43%

Courtyard of the Memorial Student Union Building, referred to as the "MSUB" or "SUB" by students

=== Residential life ===
The majority of undergraduate students at Texas A&M–Kingsville live on campus in one of several major dormitory buildings. Martin Hall, Lynch Hall, Lucio Hall (Formerly University Village), and Mesquite Village West house approximately 2,300 students in a shared or private dormitory environment. In addition to traditional male and female dorms, Texas A&M University–Kingsville provides many apartment style residence halls and suites that house approximately 1,200 students. Many of the residence halls on campus provide distinct "Living Learning Communities" for students. This optional housing arrangement helps provide a fraternal residential atmosphere for students from diverse backgrounds, academic fields and interests. These communities currently include Kinesiology, Animal Science, and Honors.

Another student dormitory, Mesquite Village West, opened in time for the Fall 2011 school year. At a cost of more than $18 Million, this 98,000 square foot building provides suite-style two and four bedroom apartments with a kitchenette, living room and one or two bathrooms per unit. It also houses the Honors College. Lucio Hall (Formerly University Village) is a residence hall with 600 beds in a suite-style environment.

Lucio Hall opened Fall 2009

The Memorial Student Union Building (commonly called the MSUB or SUB) is often referred to as the "living room of campus." It is home to the Office of Financial Aid, the Office of Student Activities, the Dean of Students, several ballrooms and meeting rooms. The building also hosts a large university bookstore, operated by Barnes & Noble. The Memorial Student Union Building also accommodates a game room with ping pong tables and several large flat screen televisions.

Many students choose to obtain meals for the Javelina Dining Hall or retail locations within the Memorial Student Union Building (MSUB).The Javelina Dining Hall is capable of accommodating around 300 students at one time, and was opened in Spring of 2011. The Javelina Dining Hall also houses two conference room event spaces available for booking. Dining services throughout the campus are provided by Aramark, operating as Javelina Dining.

=== Activities ===
The university recently opened a new Student Recreation Center. The new 24-hour center is approximately 36,000 sq ft (3,300 m^{2}) and contains two indoor multi-purpose gymnasiums that can be used for basketball, soccer, and volleyball. It also contains 5,600 sq ft (520 m^{2}) for a new cardio fitness and weight room with an elevated track. It was officially opened in April 2010.

The Steinke Physical Education Center (SPEC) is home to the university's Department of Kinesiology. The multistory complex also houses various recreational concourses that provide many activities for students, faculty, and staff throughout the semester. Among these are a bowling alley, racquetball courts, an Olympic sized swimming pool, a fitness center, and large locker rooms.

The school has many activities available to students and residents throughout the year. The Office of University Housing and Residence Life and the Office of Student Activities sponsor many activities throughout the year, including Hoggie Days (a student orientation program), fall and spring festivals, picnics, dorm activities. The Office of Student Activities also hosts free weekend movie events in the Peacock Auditorium, lawn and drive-in movie events, recreational sports, Family Weekend events, the Homecoming Bonfire, and several other traditional school spirit or entertainment activities throughout the year.

=== Media ===
Manning Hall and the KTAI radio tower

Texas A&M University-Kingsville is home to several prestigious media outlets. The South Texan is the school's official newspaper. It is a newspaper produced by students and has been in continuous publication since 1925. The South Texan has produced a distinguished list of journalists who now work in media outlets across the nation. The university offers broadcast media outlets as well. KTAI 91.1 FM, the school's official radio station, has been in operation for over 40 years. As Kingsville's only radio station, KTAI is a student-operated radio station that provides a mix of music, news, and live sports programming. The school also offers a campus television station, TAMUK TV-2, which is aired throughout the campus and via local cable television. Like KTAI, TAMUK TV-2 offers students the opportunity to work in various aspects and roles of broadcast media while earning college credit. Many students have moved on to work in radio and television throughout Texas. Both KTAI and TAMUK TV-2 are operated under the auspices of the Radio and Television division of the Communications and Theater Arts Department.

== Student organizations ==
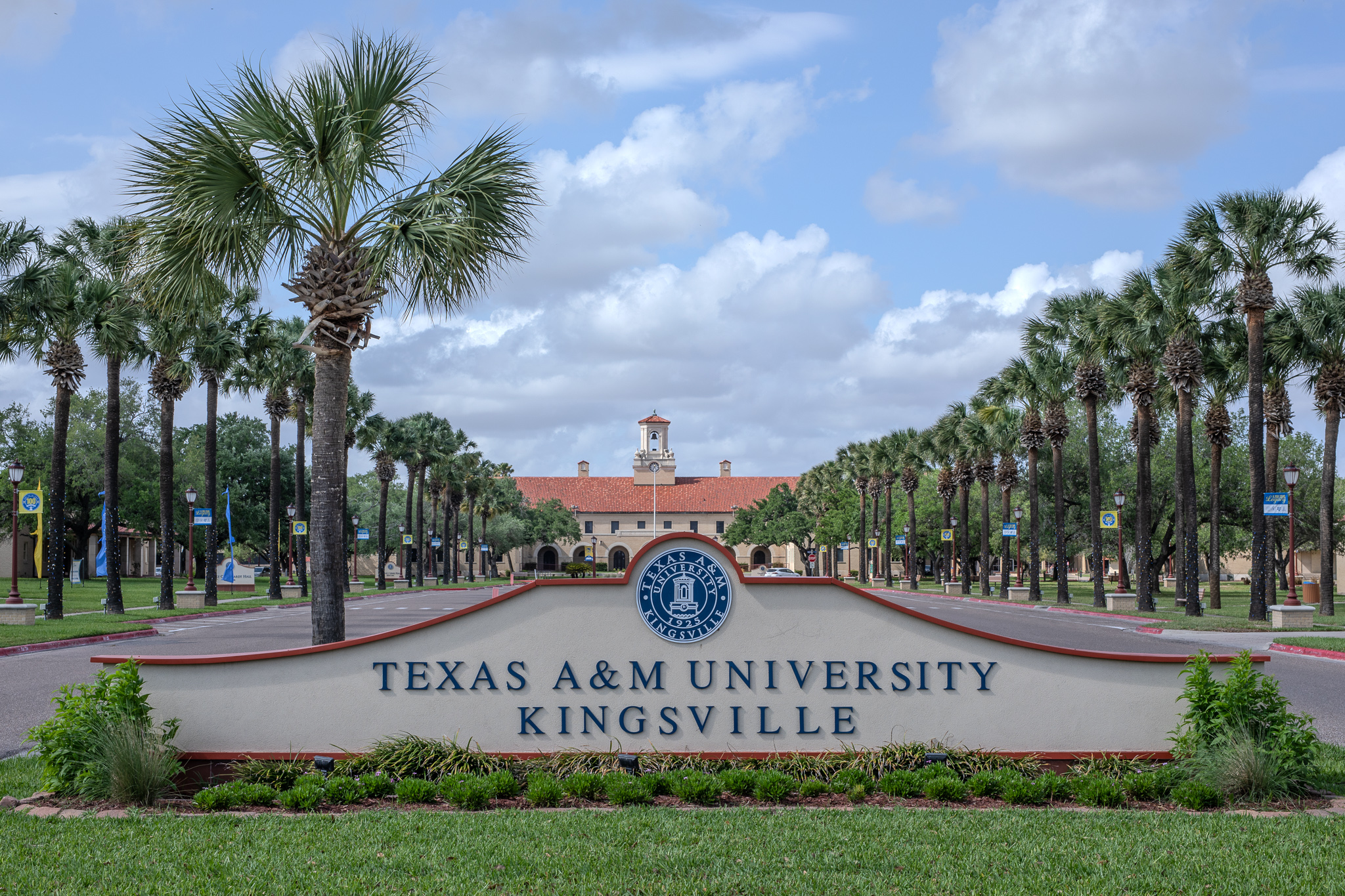
Main entrance to Texas A&M University Kingsville.

The university hosts a number of student organizations, including a number of Greek-letter academic honor societies, academic and professional societies, political clubs, religious student organizations, and many others. There are approximately 105 student organizations at Texas A&M University–Kingsville. They are divided into categories: academic, community service, honor societies, faith-based, spirit & tradition, cultural/international, military, sports, Greek, performing & visual arts, social & political issues, student government, student media, health & recreation, programming, and special interest.

=== Academic ===
==== College of Arts and Sciences ====
- Javelina Broadcast Network
- Press Club

College of Education and Human Performance

- Texas Association of Students for Bilingual Education (TASBE)
- HKN Club

==== College of Engineering ====
- Engineering Student Council (ESC)
- Architectural Engineering Institute (AEI)
- American Society of Mechanical Engineers
- American Nuclear Society (ANS)
- American Institute of Chemical Engineers
- Society of Women Engineers
- American Society of Civil Engineers
- National Society of Black Engineers
- Society of Manufacturing Engineers (SME)
- Society of Hispanic Professional Engineers
- Society of Mexican American Engineers and Scientists
- Society of Petroleum Engineers
- American Institute of Aeronautics and Astronautics
- Institute of Electrical and Electronics Engineers
- Marine Technology Society
- Association for Computing Machinery
- Information school

==== College of Business Administration ====
- Beta Gamma Sigma
- Delta Sigma Pi
- Javelina Marketing Association
- Society for Human Resource Management
- Financial Management Association
- Accounting Society

=== Greek life ===
The university is home to chapters or colonies of several Greek fraternities and sororities.

== Athletics ==
The Texas A&M–Kingsville (TAMUK) athletic teams are called the Javelinas. The university is a member of the Division II ranks of the National Collegiate Athletic Association (NCAA), primarily competing in the Lone Star Conference (LSC) since the 1954–55 academic year.

TAMUK competes in 13 intercollegiate varsity sports: Men's sports include baseball, basketball, cross country, football and track & field; while women's sports include basketball, beach volleyball, cross country, golf, softball, tennis, track & field, volleyball, and the newest program Stunt.

The Javelinas has seen much success in athletics, winning several conference titles, most recently in baseball and football.

=== Football ===
The perennial success in football led some to dub the school as a "football factory" with 7 National Championships: 1979, 1976, 1975, 1974, 1970, 1969, 1959 and 34 Conference Championships: 1931, 1932, 1938, 1939, 1941, 1951, 1952, 1959, 1960, 1962, 1967–70, 1974–77, 1979, 1985, 1987–89, 1992–97, 2001–04, 2009. The university holds the record as the Division II school with the most professional athletes signed by teams in the NFL, including Pro Football Hall of Fame inductees Gene Upshaw, Darrell Green, and John Randle.

Because of its great success, attendance at football games in Javelina Stadium ranks amongst the highest in NCAA Division II. Javelina Stadium has more than 18,000 seats, which is one of the largest Division II football stadiums in the nation. Javelina Stadium has been chosen to host the NCAA Division II Cactus Bowl every year since 2001. The Cactus Bowl draws the best senior football players from Division II football for NFL scouting activities and culminates in a game pitting seniors from the East against seniors from the West.

=== Other sports ===
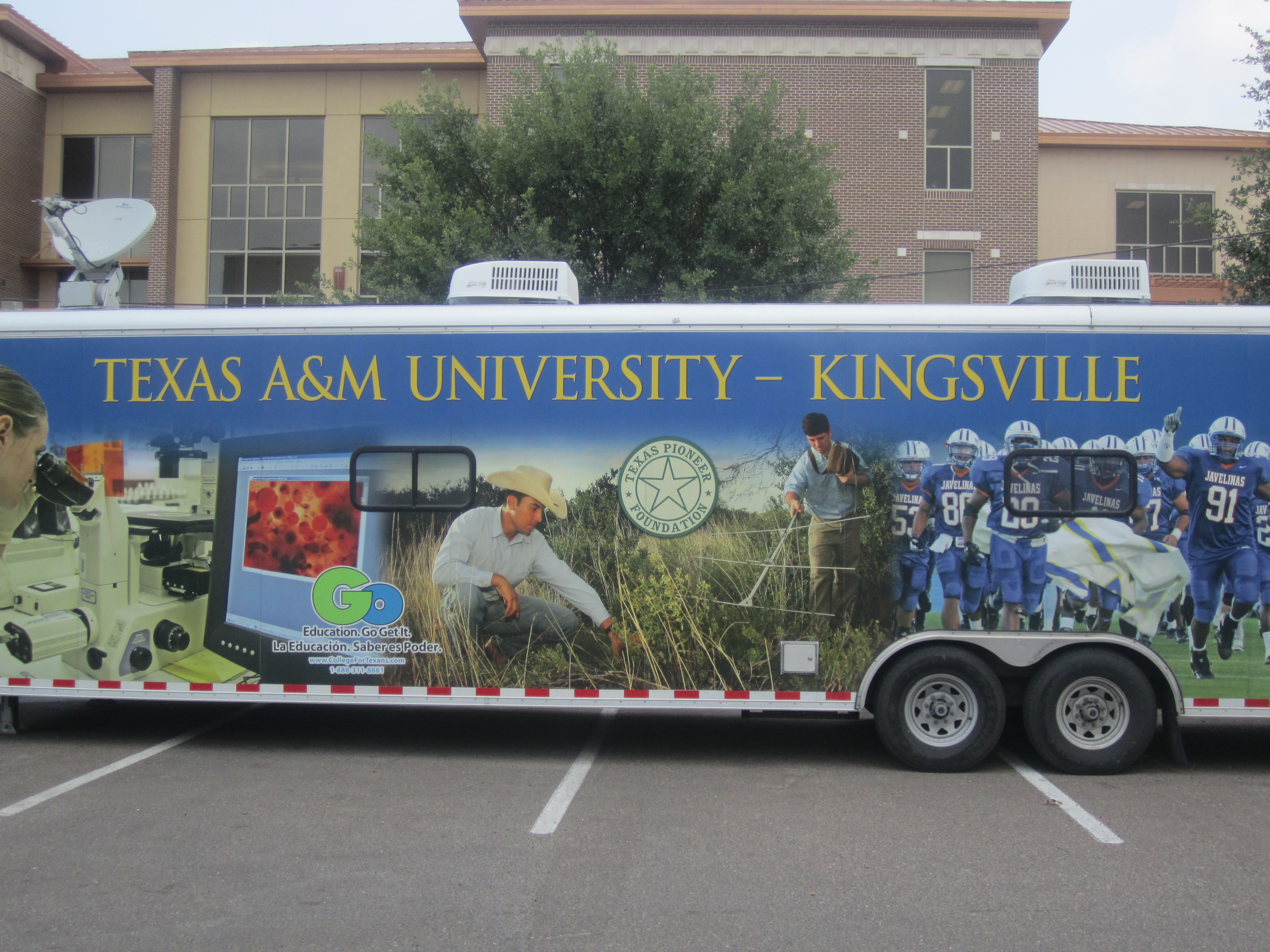
TAMU-Kingsville touring bus parked in front of the Lewis Education and Academic Center at Laredo Community College on April 30, 2012

The university offers no less than ten NCAA sanctioned sports, including five men's sports and 5 women's sports. Facilities include Javelina Stadium for football, track, and field; the Gil H. Steinke Physical Education Center for volleyball and men's and women's basketball; Nolan Ryan Field for baseball; and Vernie & Blanche Hubert Field for softball. In addition, the campus maintains facilities for tennis, soccer, racketball, swimming, platform diving and other various indoor sports.

The Department of Kinesiology and the Office of Student Activities also provide competitive intramural sports activities for students at the university. Students can compete in basketball, flag football, bowling, softball, soccer and other intramural sports hosted at the school. Many of these intramural sports leagues are hosted in the new Student Recreation Center that opened during the Spring 2010 semester.

== Traditions ==
Javelina class ring for 2008

- School colors: The school's official colors are Blue and Gold. These colors are reflected around the campus. They are seen in the uniforms of athletes, coaches, and band members. They are also found on flags, school apparel and are proudly worn during sporting events.
- Mascot: The Javelina is the official mascot of Texas A&M University–Kingsville. The mascot is paraded during official school events and games. Over the years, various mascots named Henry, Henrietta, Little Henry, Scrappy and Porky have held the honor as an official mascot. The current mascot is named Porky III.
- Alma mater: The official song of the university is Hail AMK.
- Bell chimes: Every quarter-hour, the bell chimes can be heard from atop College Hall. At the top of the hour, additional strokes will indicate the time of day. At the close of the school day, the tower will play the Alma Mater.
- School songs: The official fighting song for TAMUK is Jalisco and is played by the band following every touchdown. In addition, the Javelina Victory March is played after every field goal or extra point. Other songs are played during the games, often followed by a chant of “Go Hogs Go!”

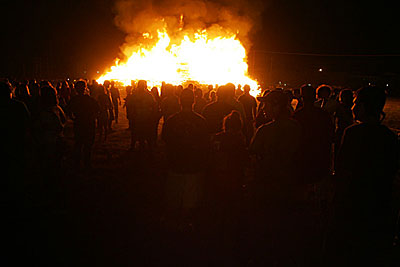
Homecoming Bonfire at Texas A&M University-Kingsville

- Tailgate party: A tailgate party is hosted in the northeastern parking lot of Javelina Stadium before each home football game. These gatherings have become a normal part of Javelina football games and attract thousands of fans. The tailgate party is open to the public and many student organizations, clubs, and surrounding businesses around the area choose to participate with lots of food, drinks, and music.
- Hoggie Days: The official and mandatory freshmen orientation of the university occurs prior to the beginning of each fall or spring semester. Events are designed to help students and parents become familiar with the traditions, procedures and experiences of life at Texas A&M University–Kingsville.
- Mesquite Groove: Every year, the KTAI radio station hosts a concert series at the stage in the Mesquite Grove located on the southern portion of the campus.
- Miss TAMUK pageant: Each spring, the Office of Student Activities holds a themed scholarship pageant. Female students compete for the title to become representatives of the university at community and school sponsored events. Past winners include Eva Longoria.
- Freshman night out: Each fall, the incoming freshman class is encouraged to attend dinner with the various faculty and staff of the university at one of the university dining halls. The purpose of this event is to allow incoming freshmen to have an opportunity to become familiar with many of the professors at the school.
- Class ring: The school has an official class ring. Graduating seniors are encouraged to order their rings and attend a special ceremony shortly before graduation.

Fall Carnival on University Blvd

- Army ROTC: The University is the proud home of Javelina Battalion, an official Army ROTC program. Cadets who complete the Army ROTC course at TAMUK become commissioned officers in the U.S. Army. In addition to coursework and sanctioned activities, the cadets of Javelina Battalion present colors during official school functions. Javelina Battalion upholds several internal traditions, including the firing of “Old Smokey” (prior to 1965, cadets fired a cannon known as "Little Jav") during home football games as well as sponsoring the Military Ball each year since 1975.
- Honor Code: In the effort to encourage academic and scholastic purity, students at Texas A&M University–Kingsville are expected to abide by the Javelina Honor Code. The Principles of the Javelina Honor Code include five fundamental values that must be adhered by students, including honesty, trust, fairness, respect and responsibility.

Students enjoy a Drive-In movie in the western parking lot of Javelina Stadium

- Honor Pledge: The accompanying Javelina Honor Pledge states, "As a student of Texas A&M University-Kingsville, I pledge to conduct myself honorably and to uphold high standards in all academic work, and to adhere to all of the values set forth in the Javelina Honor Code."
- Business Etiquette Dinner: During the fall and spring semesters, students are expected to attend a special dinner that provides training in formal dinner manners and protocol. This entertaining black tie event has become a staple of the TAMUK experience.
- Rush Week: This is the official recruiting method of the various Greek societies found at the university. During Rush, the fraternities and sororities set up recruitment stations around campus in order to promote their organizations.
- Moon Festival: This annual celebration in the courtyard of the Memorial Student Union Building kicks off the various Asian Pacific Heritage events around the campus. Visitors are treated to Asian food, visuals and entertainment that celebrates the cultures of Asia.
- Holiday decorations: Prior to the November Thanksgiving holiday, students, faculty and staff are invited to assist in decorating the campus for the winter holidays.

== Notable alumni ==
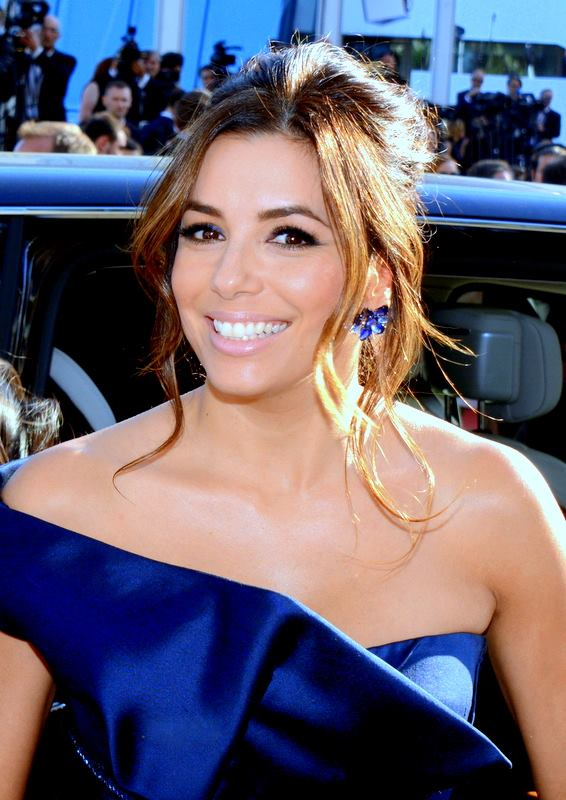
Eva Longoria

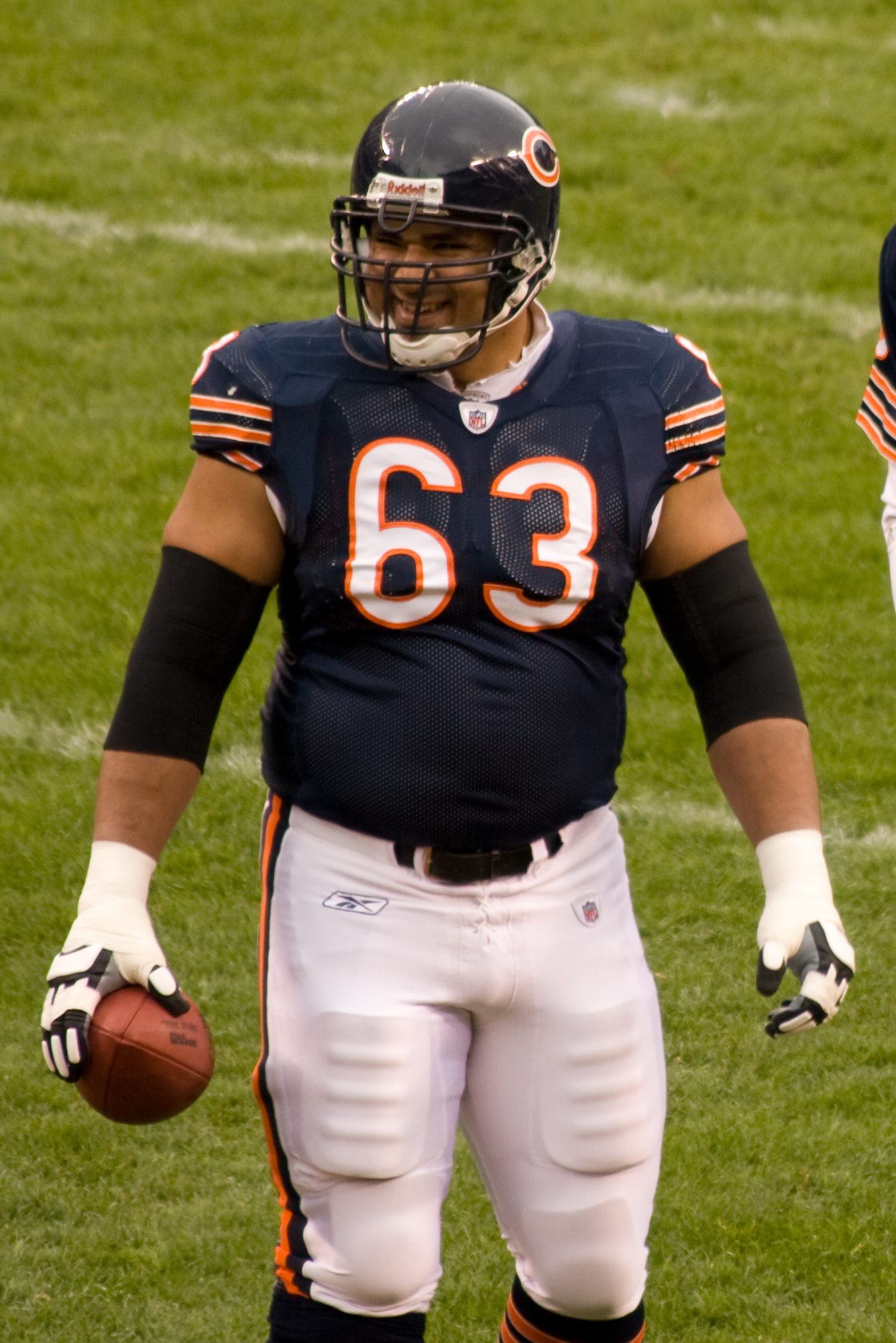
Robert Garza

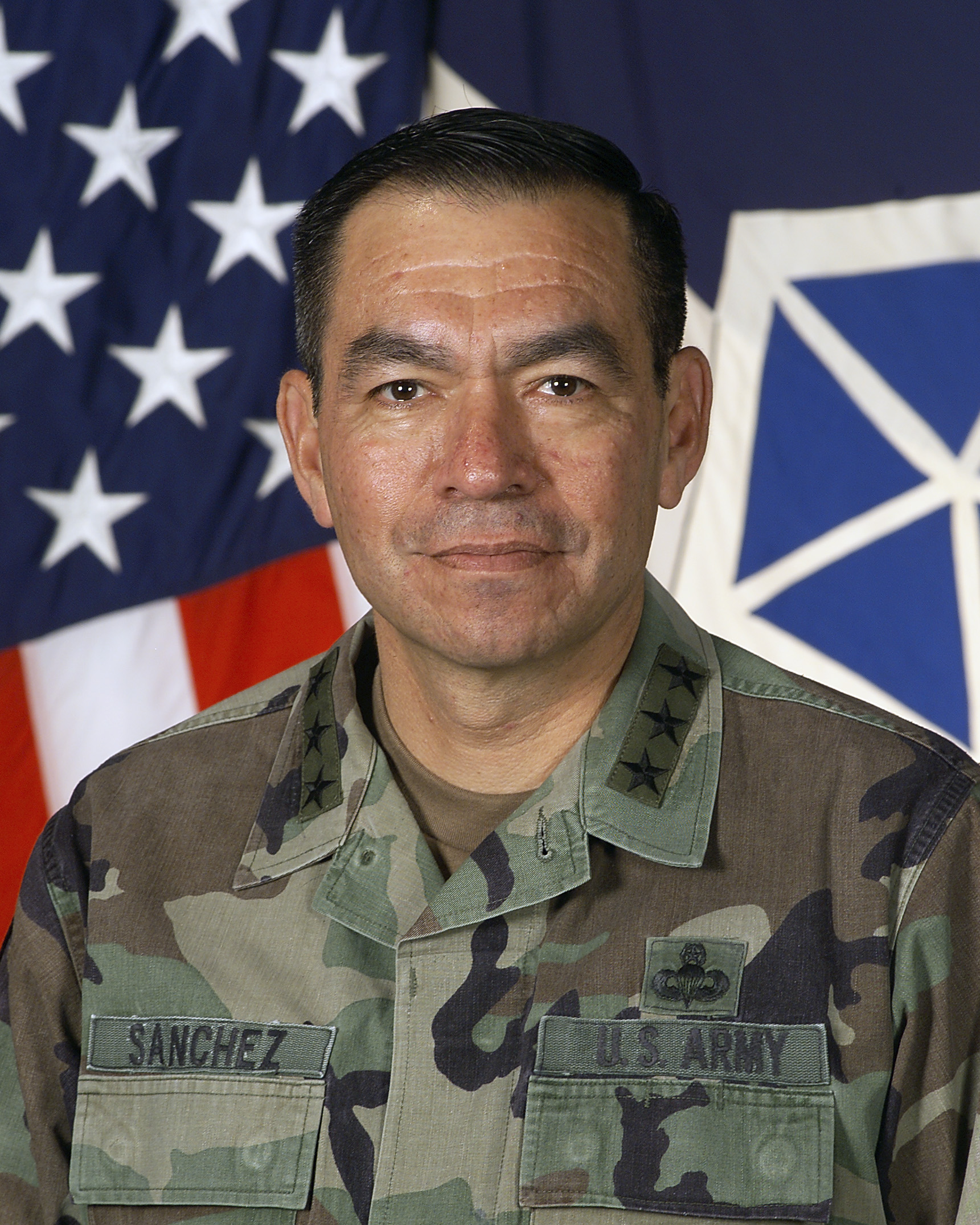
General Ricardo Sanchez

- Mike Adams, MLB pitcher, Texas Rangers
- Elsa Alcala, judge of the Texas Court of Criminal Appeals; former Houston prosecutor and state and intermediate appeals court judge
- Johnny Bailey, retired NFL running back
- Sid Blanks, retired NFL running back, Houston Oilers and the New England Patriots. First African American player in the Lone Star Conference
- Michael T. Boyd, Emmy Award-winning costume designer for film and television
- Laura Canales, Tejano singer, known as the "Queen of Tejana music"
- Juan Castillo, NFL Coach, Baltimore Ravens offensive line coach
- James Crumley, crime novelist, author of The Last Great Kiss and other works
- Jorge Diaz, retired NFL offensive lineman, Tampa Bay Buccaneers, Dallas Cowboys
- Earl Dotson, retired NFL offensive tackle for the Green Bay Packers
- Ramón H. Dovalina (B.S. and M.S.), former president of Laredo Community College
- Mike Dyal, retired NFL tight end
- George Floyd, best known for being a fatal victim of police brutality, and the inspiration behind both national and international protests, he transferred to Texas A&M University–Kingsville in 1995 and played basketball for the school but left before graduating.
- Carmen Lomas Garza, artist
- Roberto Garza, retired NFL offensive lineman, Atlanta Falcons, Chicago Bears
- Raquel González (wrestler), professional wrestler for WWE
- Darrell Green, Pro Football Hall of Famer, retired cornerback for the Washington Redskins
- Don Hardeman, retired NFL running back, Houston Oilers and Baltimore Colts
- Al Harris, NFL Cornerback for the Green Bay Packers
- Dwight Harrison, retired NFL cornerback, Denver Broncos, Buffalo Bills and Oakland Raiders
- David Hill, retired NFL tight end, Detroit Lions and Los Angeles Rams
- Jim Hill, retired NFL player for the Green Bay Packers and San Diego Chargers, Sports anchor at KCBS-TV in Los Angeles
- Armando Hinojosa, sculptor
- Rubén Hinojosa, Member of the U.S. House of Representatives from Texas's 15th District
- Tom Janik, former American Football League safety and punter, Denver Broncos, Buffalo Bills and New England Patriots
- James Jefferson (gridiron football), retired NFL Defensive back, Seattle Seahawks
- Levi Johnson, retired NFL cornerback, Detroit Lions
- Randy Johnson, American football player, first ever starting quarterback for the Atlanta Falcons
- Eva Longoria, actress and model
- Maurice Lukefahr, agricultural scientist, known for research into plant resistance to insect pests
- Alvin Matthews, retired NFL cornerback, Green Bay Packers, San Francisco 49ers
- Jose S. Mayorga, Current Adjutant General of Texas National Guard
- Jermane Mayberry, NFL Guard for the New Orleans Saints
- Eddie Moten, AFL Cornerback for the Orlando Predators
- Dwayne Nix, College Football Hall of Famer
- Ernest Price, retired NFL defensive lineman, Detroit Lions and Seattle Seahawks
- John Randle, retired NFL Hall of fame defensive tackle
- Richard Ritchie, College Football Hall of Famer, Quarterback. Attorney at Law.
- Pete Saenz, B.S. and MS., mayor of Laredo, Texas
- Ricardo Sanchez, U.S. Army Lt. General
- Kimberly A. Scott, actress
- Heath Sherman, retired NFL running back for the Philadelphia Eagles
- Gil Steinke, NFL defensive back for the Philadelphia Eagles. Longtime coach of the Javelinas. Texas Sports Hall of Fame, deceased
- Carlos Truan, member of both houses of the Texas Legislature from 1969 to 2003
- Gene Upshaw, Pro Football Hall of Famer, former Executive Director of the National Football League Players Association, deceased
- Buzz Williams, current head coach of the Maryland men's basketball team
- Karl Williams, NFL wide receiver for the Tampa Bay Buccaneers and Arizona Cardinals
