= Jermane Mayberry =

American football player (born 1973)

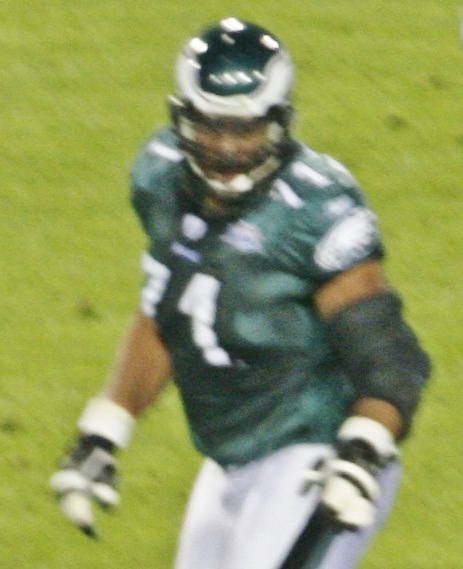

No. 71, 75
- Position: Guard

Personal information
- Born: August 29, 1973 (age 53); Floresville, Texas, U.S.
- Listed height: 6 ft 4 in (1.93 m)
- Listed weight: 325 lb (147 kg)

Career information
- High school: Floresville
- College: Texas A&M-Kingsville
- NFL draft: 1996: 1st round, 25th overall pick

Career history
- Philadelphia Eagles (1996–2004); New Orleans Saints (2005–2006)

Awards and highlights
- Second-team All-Pro (2002); Pro Bowl (2002)

Career NFL statistics
- Games played: 123
- Games started: 104
- Fumble recoveries: 1
- Stats at Pro Football Reference

Jermane Timothy Mayberry (born August 29, 1973) is an American former professional football player who was an offensive guard in the National Football League (NFL). He was selected in the first round of the 1996 NFL draft by the Philadelphia Eagles. During the beginning of his career, Mayberry played several positions along the offensive line before settling in at right guard for the majority of his tenure. His solid play was recognized with a bid to the Pro Bowl after the 2002 season. After the 2004 season, Mayberry signed with the New Orleans Saints, where he retired before the 2006 season.

== Early life ==
Mayberry attended Floresville High School in Floresville, Texas and lettered in football and basketball there.

== College career ==
At Texas A&M University Kingsville, Mayberry was a consensus Division II All-America selection and a two-time All-Lone Star Conference pick at left tackle.

== Professional career ==
Mayberry decided to retire during the 2006 season while he was on the injured reserve list.

== Personal life ==
In 1996, Mayberry contributed $100,000 to Eagles Youth Partnership to finance the Eagles Eye Mobile, a mobile unit giving free eye examinations to underprivileged youth in the Philadelphia region. This can partially be contributed to a condition Mayberry developed as a child, as he has amblyopia in one eye. He is also known to have established a frozen water ice franchise called Jayberry's Water Ice around 2003.

Mayberry became a Jehovah's Witness in 2002 after first being introduced to the faith by his wife in 1999.
